= 1908 in Germany =

- Decades: 1880s; 1890s; 1900s; 1910s; 1920s
- See also: Other events of 1908; History of Germany • Timeline • Years

Events in the year 1908 in Germany.

== Incumbents ==
=== National level ===
- Emperor – Wilhelm II
- Chancellor – Bernhard von Bülow

=== State level ===
==== Kingdoms ====
- King of Bavaria – Otto
- King of Prussia – Wilhelm II
- King of Saxony – Frederick Augustus III
- King of Württemberg – William II

==== Grand Duchies ====
- Grand Duke of Baden – Frederick II
- Grand Duke of Hesse – Ernest Louis
- Grand Duke of Mecklenburg-Schwerin – Frederick Francis IV
- Grand Duke of Mecklenburg-Strelitz – Adolphus Frederick V
- Grand Duke of Oldenburg – Frederick Augustus II
- Grand Duke of Saxe-Weimar-Eisenach – William Ernest

==== Principalities ====
- Schaumburg-Lippe – George, Prince of Schaumburg-Lippe
- Schwarzburg-Rudolstadt – Günther Victor, Prince of Schwarzburg-Rudolstadt
- Schwarzburg-Sondershausen – Charles Gonthier, Prince of Schwarzburg-Sondershausen
- Principality of Lippe – Leopold IV, Prince of Lippe
- Reuss Elder Line – Heinrich XXIV, Prince Reuss of Greiz (with Heinrich XIV, Prince Reuss Younger Line as regent)
- Reuss Younger Line – Heinrich XIV, Prince Reuss Younger Line
- Waldeck and Pyrmont – Friedrich, Prince of Waldeck and Pyrmont

==== Duchies ====
- Duke of Anhalt – Frederick II, Duke of Anhalt
- Duke of Brunswick – Duke John Albert of Mecklenburg (regent)
- Duke of Saxe-Altenburg – Ernst I, Duke of Saxe-Altenburg to 7 February, then Ernst II, Duke of Saxe-Altenburg
- Duke of Saxe-Coburg and Gotha – Charles Edward, Duke of Saxe-Coburg and Gotha
- Duke of Saxe-Meiningen – Georg II, Duke of Saxe-Meiningen

==== Colonial Governors ====
- Cameroon (Kamerun) – Theodor Seitz (3rd term)
- Kiaochow (Kiautschou) – Oskar von Truppel
- German East Africa (Deutsch-Ostafrika) – Georg Albrecht Freiherr von Rechenberg
- German New Guinea (Deutsch-Neuguinea) – Albert Hahl (2nd term)
- German Samoa (Deutsch-Samoa) – Wilhelm Solf
- German South-West Africa (Deutsch-Südwestafrika) – Bruno von Schuckmann
- Togoland – Johann Nepomuk Graf Zech auf Neuhofen

== Events ==
- 8 July – The paper coffee filter, created by German housewife Melitta Bentz, is patented.
- 28 October – Daily Telegraph Affair: a British newspaper publishes undiplomatic remarks made by Emperor Wilhelm.
- date unknown
  - German association football club BFC Nord 08 Berlin is founded.
  - Johann Heinrich von Bernstorff is appointed German ambassador to the United States.

== Births ==
- 26 January – Rupprecht Geiger, German painter (died 2009)
- 27 January – Trude Eipperle, German operatic soprano (died 1997)
- 4 February – Heinz Pollay, German equestrian (died 1979)
- 10 February – Alfred Kranzfelder, German naval officer (died 1945)
- 25 February – Karl Heinz Stroux, German actor, film- and theatredirector (died 1985)
- 2 March – Walter Bruch, German electrical engineer (died 1990)
- 7 March – Inge Viermetz, German official and defendant at the Nuremberg Trials (date of death unknown)
- 12 March – Kurt Stöpel, German bicycle racer (died 1997)
- 17 March – Brigitte Helm, German film actress (died 1996 in Switzerland)
- 25 March – Helmut Käutner, German film director (died 1980)
- 26 March – Hilde Krahwinkel Sperling, German tennis player (died 1981)
- 15 April – Richard Löwenthal, German author and journalist (died 1991)
- 19 April – Joseph Keilberth, German conductor (died 1968)
- 5 May – Kurt Böhme, German bass (died 1989)
- 7 May – Max Grundig, German entrepreneur (died 1989)
- 19 May – Rolf Dahlgrün, German politician (died 1969)
- 20 May – Carlo Otte, Nazi administrator
- 22 May – Gustav Jaenecke, German ice hockey player (died 1985)
- 11 June – Karl Hein German athlete (died 1982)
- 24 June – Hugo Distler, German composer (died 1942)
- 31 July – Franz Meyers, German politician (died 2002)
- 4 August – Kurt Eichhorn, German conductor (died 1994)
- 10 August – Hanan Rubin, German-born Israeli politician (died 1962)
- 18 August – Heinrich Hellwege, German politician (died 1991)
- 27 August – Karl Ernst Rahtgens, German officer (died 1944)
- 20 September – Alexander Mitscherlich, German psychiatrist and psychoanalyst (died 1982)
- 22 September – Fritz Gunst, German water polo player (died 1992)
- 9 October – Werner von Haeften, Oberleutnant in the Wehrmacht, who took part in the military-based conspiracy against Adolf Hitler known as the 20 July plot (died 1944)
- 12 October – Georg Henneberg, German physician (died 1996)
- 14 October – Rudolf Ismayr, German weightlifter (died 1998)
- 25 October – Gotthard Handrick, German athlete and fighter pilot (died 1978)
- 26 October – Richard Häussler, German actor (died 1964)
- 11 November – Martin Held, German actor (died 1992)
- 20 November – Louis, Prince of Hesse and by Rhine (died 1968)
- 21 November – Franz Pfnür, German alpine skier (died 1996)

== Deaths ==
- 5 January – Joseph von Mering, German physician (born 1849)
- 9 January – Wilhelm Busch, German humorist, poet, illustrator and painter (born 1832)
- 22 January – August Wilhelmj, German violinist (born 1845)
- 7 February – Ernst I, Duke of Saxe-Altenburg, nobleman (born 1826)
- 24 March – Eduard von Pestel, Prussian military officer and German general (born 1821)
- 27 March – Johann Georg Mönckeberg, politician (born 1839)
- 26 April – Karl Möbius, German zoologist (born 1825)
- 17 May:
  - Jacques Blumenthal, German pianist and composer (born 1829)
  - Carl Koldewey, German Arctic explorer (born 1837)
- 4 June – Hermann von der Hude, German architect (born 1830)
- 13 June – Henry Lomb, German-American optician, founder of Bausch & Lomb (born 1828)
- 10 July – Gustav Karl Wilhelm Hermann Karsten, German botanist (born 1817)
- 29 July – Cuno von Uechtritz-Steinkirch, German sculptor (born 1856)
- 3 November – Harro Magnussen, German sculptor (born 1861)
- 20 November – Albert Dietrich, conductor and composer (born 1829)
