= 1914 in Germany =

- Decades: 1890s; 1900s; 1910s; 1920s; 1930s
- See also: Other events of 1914; History of Germany • Timeline • Years

Events in the year 1914 in Germany.

== Incumbents ==
=== National level ===
- Emperor – Wilhelm II
- Chancellor – Theobald von Bethmann Hollweg

=== State level ===
==== Kingdoms ====
- King of Bavaria – Ludwig III
- King of Prussia – Wilhelm II
- King of Saxony – Frederick Augustus III
- King of Württemberg – William II

==== Grand Duchies ====
- Grand Duke of Baden – Frederick II
- Grand Duke of Hesse – Ernest Louis
- Grand Duke of Mecklenburg-Schwerin – Frederick Francis IV
- Grand Duke of Mecklenburg-Strelitz – Adolphus Frederick V to 11 June, then Adolphus Frederick VI
- Grand Duke of Oldenburg – Frederick Augustus II
- Grand Duke of Saxe-Weimar-Eisenach – William Ernest

==== Principalities ====
- Schaumburg-Lippe – Adolf II, Prince of Schaumburg-Lippe
- Schwarzburg-Rudolstadt – Günther Victor, Prince of Schwarzburg
- Schwarzburg-Sondershausen – Günther Victor, Prince of Schwarzburg
- Principality of Lippe – Leopold IV, Prince of Lippe
- Reuss Elder Line – Heinrich XXIV, Prince Reuss of Greiz (with Heinrich XXVII, Prince Reuss Younger Line, as regent)
- Reuss Younger Line – Heinrich XXVII, Prince Reuss Younger Line
- Waldeck and Pyrmont – Friedrich, Prince of Waldeck and Pyrmont

==== Duchies ====
- Duke of Anhalt – Frederick II, Duke of Anhalt
- Duke of Brunswick – Ernest Augustus, Duke of Brunswick
- Duke of Saxe-Altenburg – Ernst II, Duke of Saxe-Altenburg
- Duke of Saxe-Coburg and Gotha – Charles Edward, Duke of Saxe-Coburg and Gotha
- Duke of Saxe-Meiningen – Georg II, Duke of Saxe-Meiningen to 25 June, then Bernhard III, Duke of Saxe-Meiningen

==== Colonial Governors ====
- Cameroon (Kamerun) – initially ... Full, acting governor, then Karl Ebermaier (2nd and final term)
- Kiaochow (Kiautschou) – Alfred Meyer-Waldeck to 7 November
- German East Africa (Deutsch-Ostafrika) – Albert Heinrich Schnee
- German New Guinea (Deutsch-Neuguinea) – Albert Hahl (2nd term) tol 13 February, then Eduard Haber (acting governor) until 17 October
- German Samoa (Deutsch-Samoa) – Erich Schultz-Ewerth tol 29 August
- German South-West Africa (Deutsch-Südwestafrika) – Theodor Seitz
- Togoland – Duke Adolf Friedrich of Mecklenburg to 31 August

== Events ==
=== April ===
- April 24 – James Franck and Gustav Hertz's experiment on electron collisions showing internal quantum levels of atoms is presented to the Deutsche Physikalische Gesellschaft.

=== July ===
- 5 July:
  - The German Kaiser announces that he will not attend the Archduke's funeral.
  - A council is held at Potsdam, powerful leaders within Austria-Hungary and Germany meet to discuss possibilities of war with Serbia, Russia, and France.

=== August ===
- 1 August – The German Empire declares war on the Russian Empire, following Russia's military mobilization in support of Serbia; Germany also begins mobilization.
- 3 August – World War I: Germany declares war on France
- 4 August:
  - World War I: Germany declares war on Belgium
  - World War I: German troops invade neutral Belgium. The United Kingdom declares war on Germany after the latter fails to respect Belgian neutrality.
- 7 August – World War I: French and British forces invade and occupy the German colony of Togoland.
- 9 August:
  - World War I: Battle of Mulhouse begins, the opening attack of by the French army against Germany.
  - World War I: The German submarine Unterseeboot 15 is sunk by the British HMS Birmingham.
- 23 August
  - The Republic of China cancels the German lease of Kiaochow Bay (Kiautschou).
  - World War I: A New Zealand expeditionary force occupies the German colony of German Samoa (Deutsch-Samoa), following an unopposed invasion.
  - World War I: Battle of Mons, the first major action of the war between the British Expeditionary Force and the German Army, in which the German forces are defeated.
- 28 August – World War I: The Battle of Heligoland - three German cruisers are sunk by British cruisers.

=== September ===
- 5–12 September – World War I: First Battle of the Marne begins: Northeast of Paris, German forces are attacked by the British Expeditionary Force and the French 6th Army. Over 2 million fight (500,000 killed/wounded) in victory for the Anglo-French forces.
- 13–28 September – World War I: First Battle of the Aisne involving British, French and German forces.
- 21 September– World War I: All German armed forces in German New Guinea (Deutsch-Neuguinea) surrender to the Australian Naval and Military Expeditionary Force.

=== October ===
- 4 October – Manifesto of the Ninety-Three proclaimed in Germany.
- 19 October – 22 November – World War I: First Battle of Ypres fought between British, French and German forces in Ypres in Belgium.

=== November ===
- 1 November – World War I: Battle of Coronel fought – German forces, led by Vice-Admiral Graf Maximilian von Spee, defeat a Royal Navy squadron.
- 7 November – World War I: Following the Siege of Tsingtao, Japanese armed forces assume control of the German colonial concession at Kiaochow Bay (Kiautschou).

=== December ===
- 8 December – World War I: The Battle of the Falkland Islands, the German fleet is defeated by the British Royal Navy.
- 24 December – World War I: German and British soldiers begin an unofficial Christmas truce.

== Births ==
=== January ===
- 6 January - Heinz Berggruen, German art dealer (died 2007)
- 12 January – Albrecht von Goertz, German car designer (died 2006)
- 18 January - Arno Schmidt, German author (died 1979)

=== February ===
- 4 February - Alfred Andersch, German writer (died 1980)
- 20 February - Erich Ziegler, German politician and resistance activist (died 2004)
- 20 February - Hans Pischner, German conductor (died 2016)
- 22 February - Karl Otto Götz, German painter (died 2017)

=== March ===
- Wilhelm Wegner, German highly decorated Leutnant in the Wehrmacht (died 1989)
- March 2 - Walter Haeussermann, German engineer and rocket scientist (died 2010)
- March 18 - Prince Ernest Augustus of Hanover (died 1987)

=== April ===
- 8 April – Günter Amelung, highly decorated Rittmeister of the Reserves in the Wehrmacht (died 1944)
- 12 April - Gretel Bergmann, German high jumper (died 2017)
- 20 April – Otto Weiß, former German pair skater

=== May ===
- 3 May – Eugen-Ludwig Zweigart, German Luftwaffe fighter ace and recipient of the Knight's Cross of the Iron Cross (died 1944)
- 7 May – Joachim Wandel, German Luftwaffe ace and recipient of the Knight's Cross of the Iron Cross (died 1942)
- 26 May – Erhard Weiß, German diver (died 1957)
- 27 May – Otto Weidinger, member of the Waffen-SS (died (1990)

=== June ===
- 1 June – Karl Wanka, highly decorated Major of the Reserves in the Wehrmacht during World War II (died 1980)
- 13 June – Prince Aschwin of Lippe-Biesterfeld, art historian (died 1988)

=== July ===
- 1 July – Orli Wald, member of the German Resistance in Nazi Germany (died 1962)
- 1 July - Christl Cranz, German alpine racer (died 2004)
- 9 July - Willi Stoph, German politician (died 1999)
- 16 July – Herbert Nürnberg, German boxer (died 1995)

=== August ===
- 27 August – Heidi Kabel, actress (died 2010)

=== September ===
- September 15 - Will Quadflieg, actor (died 2003)
- September 22 - Siegfried Lowitz, actor (died 1999)

=== November ===
- 6 November – Alfred Zwiebel, German-American landscape, floral, and still-life paint (died 2005)
- 13 November - Paul Lücke, German politician (died 1976)
- 15 November - Erich Steidtmann, German Nazi SS officer (died 2010)

=== December ===
- 5 December – Edmund Wagner, German Luftwaffe ace and recipient of the Knight's Cross of the Iron Cross (died 1941)
- 13 December – Fritz Zängl, German skier and soldier (died 1943)
- 14 December – Karl Carstens, German politician, former President of Germany (died 1992)
- 19 December – Dietrich Hrabak, German World War II flying ace (died 1995)
- 21 December – Theodor Weissenberger, German Luftwaffe military aviator during World War II (died 1959)
- 24 December- Herbert Reinecker, German dramatist and screenwriter (died 2007)
- 26 December – Annemarie Wendl, German actress (died 2006)
- 29 December – Alfred Vohrer, German film director (died 1986)

== Deaths ==
=== January ===
- 13 January - Alfred Lichtwark, German art historian and museum curator (born 1852)

=== March ===
- 21 March - August Wöhler, German railway engineer (born 1819)
- 22 March - Otto Harnack, German historian (born 1857)
- 31 March – Christian Morgenstern, German author (born 1871)

=== April ===
- 2 April – Paul Heyse German writer and translator (born 1839)
- 11 April - Carl Chun, German biologist (born 1852)

=== May ===
- 29 May - Paul Mauser, German weapon designer and manufacturer/industrialist (born 1838)

=== June ===
- 11 June – Adolphus Frederick V, Grand Duke of Mecklenburg, nobleman (born 1848)
- 16 June - Ferdinand Adolf Kehrer, German gynecologist w (born 1837)
- 25 June – Georg II, Duke of Saxe-Meiningen, nobleman (born 1826)

=== August ===
- 1 August – Adolf Zander, German composer (born 1843)
- 19 August – Franz Xavier Wernz, German Superior General of the Society of Jesus (born 1842)
- 24 August – Johannes Weiss, German Protestant theologian and biblical exegete (born 1863)

=== September ===
- 9 September - Albert Arnz, German painter (born 1832)
- 25 September – Alfred Lichtenstein (writer), German writer (born 1889)
- 26 September – August Macke, German painter (born 1887)
- 26 September - Hermann Löns, German poet (born 1866)

=== October ===
- 4 September – Theodor Weber, German physician (born 1829)
- 27 September – Robert von Pöhlmann, German ancient historian (born 1852)

=== November ===
- 2 November – Heinrich Burkhardt, German mathematician (born 1861)
- 5 November – August Weismann, German biologist (born 1834)
- 14 November - Leonhard Tietz, German merchant (born 1849)

=== December ===
- 13 December - Walther Bronsart von Schellendorff, German general (born 1833)
- 17 December – Otto Sackur, 34, (German physical chemist) (born 1880)

=== Date unknown ===
- Gustav Weymer, 81, (German entomologist)
