= 1915 in Germany =

- Decades: 1890s; 1900s; 1910s; 1920s; 1930s
- See also: Other events of 1915; History of Germany • Timeline • Years

Events in the year 1915 in Germany.

== Incumbents ==
=== National level ===
- Emperor – Wilhelm II
- Chancellor – Theobald von Bethmann Hollweg

=== State level ===
==== Kingdoms ====
- King of Bavaria – Ludwig III
- King of Prussia – Wilhelm II
- King of Saxony – Frederick Augustus III
- King of Württemberg – William II

==== Grand Duchies ====
- Grand Duke of Baden – Frederick II
- Grand Duke of Hesse – Ernest Louis
- Grand Duke of Mecklenburg-Schwerin – Frederick Francis IV
- Grand Duke of Mecklenburg-Strelitz – Adolphus Frederick VI
- Grand Duke of Oldenburg – Frederick Augustus II
- Grand Duke of Saxe-Weimar-Eisenach – William Ernest

==== Principalities ====
- Schaumburg-Lippe – Adolf II, Prince of Schaumburg-Lippe
- Schwarzburg-Rudolstadt – Günther Victor, Prince of Schwarzburg
- Schwarzburg-Sondershausen – Günther Victor, Prince of Schwarzburg
- Principality of Lippe – Leopold IV, Prince of Lippe
- Reuss Elder Line – Heinrich XXIV, Prince Reuss of Greiz (with Heinrich XXVII, Prince Reuss Younger Line, as regent)
- Reuss Younger Line – Heinrich XXVII, Prince Reuss Younger Line
- Waldeck and Pyrmont – Friedrich, Prince of Waldeck and Pyrmont

==== Duchies ====
- Duke of Anhalt – Frederick II, Duke of Anhalt
- Duke of Brunswick – Ernest Augustus, Duke of Brunswick
- Duke of Saxe-Altenburg – Ernst II, Duke of Saxe-Altenburg
- Duke of Saxe-Coburg and Gotha – Charles Edward, Duke of Saxe-Coburg and Gotha
- Duke of Saxe-Meiningen – Bernhard III, Duke of Saxe-Meiningen

==== Colonial Governors ====
- Cameroon (Kamerun) – Karl Ebermaier (2nd and final term)
- German East Africa (Deutsch-Ostafrika) – Albert Heinrich Schnee
- German South-West Africa (Deutsch-Südwestafrika) – Theodor Seitz to 15 July

== Events ==
- 9 July – German forces in German South-West Africa (Deutsch-Südwestafrika) capitulate and the territory is occupied by South Africa.
- 20 August – An auto parts, electronics and other manufacturing brand, ZF Friedrichshafen was founded, as predecessor name was Zepernicker Zahnradfabrik.

=== Undated ===
- German geophysicist Alfred Wegener publishes his theory of Pangea, which he calls Urkontinent.
- German palaeontologist Ernst Stromer publishes an article assigning the specimen to a new genus and species Spinosaurus aegyptiacus.

== Births ==
- 3 January – Mady Rahl, German actress (died 2009)
- 22 January – Heinrich Albertz, German politician (died 1993)
- 27 January – Ernst Schröder, German actor (died 1994)
- 14 February – Georg Thomalla, German actor (died 1999)
- 21 February – Roland von Hößlin, German officer (died 1944)
- 6 March – Hans-Ulrich von Oertzen, German officer (died 1944)
- 7 March – Johannes Wiese, German pilot during World War II, a fighter ace (died 1991)
- 11 March – Karl Krolow, German poet (died 1991)
- 12 March – Reimar Horten, German aircraft pilots (died 1994)
- 13 April:
  - Max Jammer, German-born Israeli physicist (died 2010)
  - Stephan Hermlin, German poet (died 1997)
- 29 May – Karl Münchinger, German conductor (died 1990)
- 16 June – Marga Faulstich, German chemist (died 1998)
- 25 August – Georg von Boeselager, German nobleman and an officer in the Wehrmacht (died 1944)
- 26 August – Rolf Friedemann Pauls, German diplomat (died 2002)
- 28 August – Paul Schneider-Esleben, German architect (died 2005)
- 5 September – Horst Sindermann, German politician (died 1990)
- 6 September – Franz Josef Strauss, German politician (died 1988)
- 15 September – Helmut Schön, German football player and manager (died 1996)
- 9 October – Henner Henkel, German tennis champion (died 1942)
- 9 December - Elisabeth Schwarzkopf, German-British operatic soprano (died 2006)
- 13 December – Curd Jürgens, German actor (died 1982)

== Deaths ==
- 4 January – Anton von Werner, German painter (born 1843)
- 9 April – Friedrich Loeffler, German bacteriologist (born 1852)
- 2 May – Clara Immerwahr, German chemist (born 1870)
- 10 May – Karl Gotthard Lamprecht, German historian (born 1856)
- 15 May – Oskar Frenzel, German painter (born 1855)
- 20 June – Emil Rathenau, German entrepreneur and industrialist (born 1838)
- 9 July – Carl Walther, German gunsmith (born 1858)
- 15 July – Joseph Thyssen, German industrialist (born 1844)
- 4 August – Richard Kiepert, German cartographer (born 1846)
- 20 August – Paul Ehrlich, German physician and scientist (born 1854)
- 19 September – David Friedrich Weinland, German zoologist and novelist (born 1829)
- 27 September – Kaspar von Zumbusch, German sculptor (born 1830)
- 15 October – Theodor Boveri, German biologist (born 1862)
- 4 December – Gustav Hollaender, German violinist, composer and conductor (born 1855)
- 19 December – Alois Alzheimer, German psychiatrist and neuropathologist (born 1864)
