= 1992 in Germany =

- Decades: 1970s; 1980s; 1990s; 2000s; 2010s
- See also: Other events of 1992; History of Germany; Timeline; Years

Events in the year 1992 in Germany.

== Incumbents ==
- President – Richard von Weizsäcker
- Chancellor – Helmut Kohl

== Events ==
- February 13–24 - 42nd Berlin International Film Festival
- March 30: Germany in the Eurovision Song Contest 1992
- April 13: The 5.3 M_{w} Roermond earthquake affects Netherlands, Germany, and Belgium with a maximum Mercalli intensity of VII (Very strong).
- June 13-September 20: Documenta 9
- July 6–8: The 18th G7 summit is held in Munich.
- August 22–24: Rostock-Lichtenhagen riots.
- September 17: The Mykonos restaurant assassinations occur in Berlin.
- October 1 - Tom & Jerry: The Movie is released to theaters.
- Date unknown - The Scientology Task Force of the Hamburg Interior Authority is formed.

== Sport ==
- 1991–92 Bundesliga
- 1991–92 2. Bundesliga
- 1991–92 ice hockey Bundesliga season
- 1992 ATP German Open
- 1992 BMW Open
- 1992 German Grand Prix
- 1992 German motorcycle Grand Prix
- 1992 DTM season
- Germany at the 1992 Summer Olympics
- Germany at the 1992 Winter Olympics

== Film ==
- 42nd Berlin International Film Festival
- 5th European Film Awards

== Music ==
- Germany in the Eurovision Song Contest 1992

== Births ==
- January 5 – Julian Derstroff, German footballer
- February 1 - Stefan Bötticher, German cyclist
- February 15 - Peter Kretschmer, German canoeist
- March 4 - Bernd Leno, German footballer
- March 9 - Mateusz Przybylko, German high jumper
- April 17 - Shkodran Mustafi, German footballer
- April 29 - Alina Rosenberg, German Paralympic equestrian
- April 30
  - Marcel Bauer, politician
  - Marc-André ter Stegen, German footballer
- May 2 - Vanessa Mai, German singer
- June 3 - Mario Götze, German footballer
- June 9 - Pietro Lombardi, German singer and winner of Deutschland sucht den Superstar (season 8)
- June 16 - Maik Brückner, politician
- June 30 - Tobias Cremer, German politician
- July 2 - Tatjana Pinto, German athlete
- July 7 – Toni Garrn, German model
- July 22 - Carolin Schnarre, German Paralympic equestrian
- August 3 - Gesa Felicitas Krause, German athlete
- August 6 - Mathias Brugger, German athlete
- September 2 - Konrad Abeltshauser, German ice hockey player
- September 3 – Felix von Zobel, German politician
- October 12 – Cüneyt Köz, German footballer
- October 15 - Sarah Lombardi, German singer and runner-up of Deutschland sucht den Superstar (season 8)
- November 6 - Stefan Ortega, German footballer
- November 28 - Emilia Schüle, German actress

== Deaths ==
- 1 January – Oskar Munzel, German WWII general (born 1899)
- 13 January – Josef Neckermann, equestrian and businessman (born 1912)
- 22 January – Liesel Bach, German aerobatic pilot (born 1905)
- 31 January - Martin Held, actor (born 1908)
- 6 February – Felix Rexhausen, journalist (born 1932)
- 20 February – Barbara Lüdemann, politician (born 1922)
- 12 March - Heinz Kühn, German politician (born 1912)
- 1 April - Walter Andreas Schwarz, German singer, songwriter (born 1913)
- 6 May – Marlene Dietrich, German-American actress (born 1901)
- 30 May - Karl Carstens, German politician, former President of Germany (born 1914)
- 3 June - Wilfried Dietrich, German wrestler (born 1933)
- 14 June - Thomas Nipperdey, German historian (born 1927)
- 19 July - Heinz Galinski, President of Central Council of Jews in Germany (born 1912)
- 7 August – Lilo Milchsack, German promoter of Anglo-German relations (born 1905)
- 10 August - Kurt A. Körber, German entrepreneur (born 1909)
- 1 October
  - Gert Bastian, politician (born 1923)
  - Petra Kelly, politician (born 1947)
- 8 October – Willy Brandt, German politician, former Chancellor of Germany (born 1913)
- 22 October - Wolf Kaiser, actor (born 1916)
- 9 November- Fritz Gunst, water polo player (born 1908)

== See also ==
- 1992 in German television
