= 1909 in Germany =

- Decades: 1880s; 1890s; 1900s; 1910s; 1920s
- See also: Other events of 1909; History of Germany • Timeline • Years

Events in the year 1909 in Germany.

== Incumbents ==
=== National level ===
- Emperor – Wilhelm II
- Chancellor – Bernhard von Bülow until 14 July, then Theobald von Bethmann Hollweg

=== State level ===
==== Kingdoms ====
- King of Bavaria – Otto
- King of Prussia – Wilhelm II
- King of Saxony – Frederick Augustus III
- King of Württemberg – William II

==== Grand Duchies ====
- Grand Duke of Baden – Frederick II
- Grand Duke of Hesse – Ernest Louis
- Grand Duke of Mecklenburg-Schwerin – Frederick Francis IV
- Grand Duke of Mecklenburg-Strelitz – Adolphus Frederick V
- Grand Duke of Oldenburg – Frederick Augustus II
- Grand Duke of Saxe-Weimar-Eisenach – William Ernest

==== Principalities ====
- Schaumburg-Lippe – George, Prince of Schaumburg-Lippe
- Schwarzburg-Rudolstadt – Günther Victor, Prince of Schwarzburg-Rudolstadt (who assumed the title "Prince of Schwarzburg" from 28 March)
- Schwarzburg-Sondershausen – Charles Gonthier, Prince of Schwarzburg-Sondershausen to 28 March, then Günther Victor, Prince of Schwarzburg
- Principality of Lippe – Leopold IV, Prince of Lippe
- Reuss Elder Line – Heinrich XXIV, Prince Reuss of Greiz (with Heinrich XIV, Prince Reuss Younger Line as regent)
- Reuss Younger Line – Heinrich XIV, Prince Reuss Younger Line
- Waldeck and Pyrmont – Friedrich, Prince of Waldeck and Pyrmont

==== Duchies ====
- Duke of Anhalt – Frederick II, Duke of Anhalt
- Duke of Brunswick – Duke John Albert of Mecklenburg (regent)
- Duke of Saxe-Altenburg – Ernst II, Duke of Saxe-Altenburg
- Duke of Saxe-Coburg and Gotha – Charles Edward, Duke of Saxe-Coburg and Gotha
- Duke of Saxe-Meiningen – Georg II, Duke of Saxe-Meiningen

==== Colonial Governors ====
- Cameroon (Kamerun) – Theodor Seitz (3rd term) to 10 February, then Wilhelm Peter Hansen (acting governor) to October, the again Theodor Seitz (4th and final term)
- Kiaochow (Kiautschou) – Oskar von Truppel
- German East Africa (Deutsch-Ostafrika) – Georg Albrecht Freiherr von Rechenberg
- German New Guinea (Deutsch-Neuguinea) – Albert Hahl (2nd term)
- German Samoa (Deutsch-Samoa) – Wilhelm Solf
- German South-West Africa (Deutsch-Südwestafrika) – Bruno von Schuckmann
- Togoland – Johann Nepomuk Graf Zech auf Neuhofen

== Events ==
- 19 December: German football club Borussia Dortmund was founded.
- Summer – German Chemists Fritz Haber and Carl Bosch first demonstrate the Haber process, the catalytic formation of ammonia from hydrogen and atmospheric nitrogen under conditions of high temperature and pressure.

=== Undated ===
- Bavaria 09 Berlin, German association football club founded.
- A team under German chemist Fritz Hofmann first synthesizes synthetic rubber (Methylkautschuk).
- Linde–Frank–Caro process was invented by Adolf Frank and developed with Carl von Linde and Heinrich Caro.

(Methylkautschuk).

== Births ==
- 4 January – Cilly Aussem, German tennis player (died 1963)
- 8 January – Willy Millowitsch, German actor (died 1999)
- 15 January – Jean Bugatti, German automobile designer (died 1939)
- 31 January – Yosef Burg German-born Israeli politician and rabbi (died 1999)
- 3 February – Kurt Petter, physician, youth leader and educational administrator (died 1969)
- 20 February – Heinz Erhardt, German comedian (died 1979)
- 19 March – Otto John, German lawyer (died 1997)
- 27 March – Golo Mann, German historian, essayist and writer (died 1994)
- 2 April – Otto Haxel, German nuclear physicist (died 1998)
- 23 April – Karl Klasen, German banker (died 1991)
- 24 April: Bernhard Grzimek German zoo director, zoologist, book author, editor, and animal conservationist in postwar West-Germany.(died 1987)
- Konrad Frey, German gymnast (died 1974)
- Werner Jacobs, German film director (died 1999)
- 25 April – Ludwig Martin, German lawyer (died 2010)
- 26 April – Marianne Hoppe, German actress (died 2002)
- 8 May – Paul May, German film director (died 1976)
- 11 May – Georg von Holtzbrinck, German publisher (died 1983)
- 22 May – Willi Geiger, German judge (died 1994)
- 25 May – Alfred Kubel, German politician (died 1999)
- 21 June — Helmut Möckel, youth leader and politician (died 1945)
- 22 June – Heinrich Graf von Lehndorff-Steinort, German officer (died 1944)
- 4 July – Alex Seidel, German weapons manufacturer (died 1989)
- 7 July – Gottfried von Cramm, German tennis player (died 1976)
- 12 July – Fritz Leonhardt, German structural engineer (died 1999)
- 22 July – Franz-Josef Röder, politician (died 1979)
- 9 August – Adam von Trott zu Solz, German diplomat (died 1944)
- 13 August – Werner Otto, German businessman (died 2011)
- 5 September – Hans Carste, German composer and conductor (died 1971)
- 7 September – Kurt A. Körber, German entrepreneur (died 1992)
- 14 October – Bernd Rosemeyer, German racing driver (died 1938)
- 25 October – Dieter Borsche, German actor (died 1982)
- 30 October – Carl Lange, German actor (died 1999)
- 7 November – Ezriel Carlebach, German-born Israeli journalist and publicist (died 1956)
- 1 December – Hans-Heinrich Sievert, German decathlete (died 1963)
- 2 December – Marion Dönhoff, German journalist (died 2002)
- 3 December – Charlotte Kretschmann, German supercentenarian (died 2024)
- 23 December – Joachim Werner, German archaeologist (died 1994)

== Deaths ==
- 22 January – Emil Erlenmeyer, chemist (born 1825)
- 2 February – Adolf Stoecker, German pastor and politician (born 1835)
- 26 February – Hermann Ebbinghaus, psychologist (born 1850)
- 24 March – Alfred Messel, German architect (born 1853)
- 28 March – Charles Gonthier, Prince of Schwarzburg-Sondershausen, nobleman (born 1830)
- 30 April – Albert Langen, German publisher (born 1869)
- 9 May – Margarete Steiff, German seamstress and company founder (born 1847)
- 13 May – Heinrich Limpricht, German chemist (born 1827)
- 19 May - Gustav zu Bentheim-Tecklenburg, German politician (born 1849)
- 24 May – Georg von Neumayer, German polar explorer (born 1826)
- 3 June - Theodor Barth, German politician and publicis (born 1849)
- 8 June – Fritz Overbeck, German painter (born 1869)
- 3 July – Hermann Johannes Pfannenstiel, German gynecologist (born 1862)
- 13 October – Julius Ruthardt, German violinist and composer (born 1841)
- 30 October – Leopold Sonnemann, German newspaper publisher (born 1831)
- 16 December – Ludwig Friedländer, German philologist (born 1824)
