= Sturman =

Sturman is a surname. Notable people with the surname include:

- Reuben Sturman (1924–1997), American pornographer and businessman
- Walter Sturman (1882–1958), English cricketer

== See also ==
- Sturmanite
- Josef Stürmann (1906–1959), German philosopher
