= 1912 in Germany =

- Decades: 1890s; 1900s; 1910s; 1920s; 1930s
- See also: Other events of 1912; History of Germany • Timeline • Years

Events in the year 1912 in Germany.

== Incumbents ==
=== National level ===
- Emperor – Wilhelm II
- Chancellor – Theobald von Bethmann Hollweg

=== State level ===
==== Kingdoms ====
- King of Bavaria – Otto
- King of Prussia – Wilhelm II
- King of Saxony – Frederick Augustus III
- King of Württemberg – William II

==== Grand Duchies ====
- Grand Duke of Baden – Frederick II
- Grand Duke of Hesse – Ernest Louis
- Grand Duke of Mecklenburg-Schwerin – Frederick Francis IV
- Grand Duke of Mecklenburg-Strelitz – Adolphus Frederick V
- Grand Duke of Oldenburg – Frederick Augustus II
- Grand Duke of Saxe-Weimar-Eisenach – William Ernest

==== Principalities ====
- Schaumburg-Lippe – Adolf II, Prince of Schaumburg-Lippe
- Schwarzburg-Rudolstadt – Günther Victor, Prince of Schwarzburg
- Schwarzburg-Sondershausen – Günther Victor, Prince of Schwarzburg
- Principality of Lippe – Leopold IV, Prince of Lippe
- Reuss Elder Line – Heinrich XXIV, Prince Reuss of Greiz (with Heinrich XIV, Prince Reuss Younger Line as regent)
- Reuss Younger Line – Heinrich XIV, Prince Reuss Younger Line
- Waldeck and Pyrmont – Friedrich, Prince of Waldeck and Pyrmont

==== Duchies ====
- Duke of Anhalt – Frederick II, Duke of Anhalt
- Duke of Brunswick – Duke John Albert of Mecklenburg (regent)
- Duke of Saxe-Altenburg – Ernst II, Duke of Saxe-Altenburg
- Duke of Saxe-Coburg and Gotha – Charles Edward, Duke of Saxe-Coburg and Gotha
- Duke of Saxe-Meiningen – Georg II, Duke of Saxe-Meiningen

==== Colonial Governors ====
- Cameroon (Kamerun) – .... Hansen (acting governor) to 29 March, then Karl Ebermaier (1st term)
- Kiaochow (Kiautschou) – Alfred Meyer-Waldeck
- German East Africa (Deutsch-Ostafrika) – Georg Albrecht Freiherr von Rechenberg to 22 April, then Albert Heinrich Schnee
- German New Guinea (Deutsch-Neuguinea) – Albert Hahl (2nd term)
- German Samoa (Deutsch-Samoa) – Erich Schultz-Ewerth
- German South-West Africa (Deutsch-Südwestafrika) – Theodor Seitz
- Togoland – Edmund Brückner to 19 June, then Duke Adolf Friedrich of Mecklenburg

== Events ==
- January 12 – German federal election, 1912
- October 17 – Krupp engineers Benno Strauss and Eduard Maurer patent austenitic stainless steel
- December 6 – The Nefertiti Bust was found at Amarna by the German Oriental Company (Deutsche Orient-Gesellschaft – DOG), led by German archaeologist Ludwig Borchardt.
- December 24 – Merck files patent applications in Germany for synthesis of the entactogenic drug MDMA (Ecstasy), developed by Anton Köllisch.

=== Undated ===
- German company Fresenius is founded by Eduard Fresenius.
- Alfred Wegener proposes a fully formulated theory of continental drift and gave the supercontinent Pangaea its name.
- Max von Laue suggests using crystal lattices to diffract X-rays.
- Neosalvarsan becomes available and supersedes the more toxic and less water-soluble salvarsan as an effective treatment for syphilis.

== Births ==
- 16 January – Willy Kaiser, German boxer (died 1986)
- 21 January – Konrad Emil Bloch, German biochemist (died 2000)
- 1 February – Erich Campe, German boxer (died 1977)
- 5 February – Hedwig Potthast, German secretary and mistress of Heinrich Himmler (died 1997)
- 18 February – Heinz Kühn, German politician (died 1992)
- 24 February – Ulrich de Maizière, German general (died 2006)
- 3 March – Klaus Gysi, politician (died 1999)
- 4 March – Ferdinand Leitner, German conductor (died 1996)
- 6 March – Klaus von Bismarck, German journalist (died 1997)
- 8 March – Joachim Schepke, German submarine commander (died 1941)
- 13 March – Carl Raddatz, German actor (died 2004)
- 22 March – Alfred Schwarzmann, German gymnast (died 2000)
- 23 March – Wernher von Braun, German aerospace engineer and space architect (died 1977)
- 29 March – Hanna Reitsch, German soldier and pilot (d. 1979)
- 31 March – Hermann Höcherl, German politician (died 1989)
- 29 April – Moshe Landau, German-born Israeli jurist and president of the Supreme Court of Israel (died 2011)
- 2 May:
  - Axel Springer, German journalist (died 1985)
  - Karl Adam, German rowing coach (died 1976)
- 9 May – Fritz Sennheiser, German electrical engineer and entrepreneur, founder of Sennheiser (died 2010)
- 1 June – Oswald Lange, German aerospace engineer (died 2012)
- 5 June – Josef Neckermann, German equestrian and businessman (died 1992)
- 11 June - Bruno von Freytag-Löringhoff, German philosopher, mathematician and epistemologist (died 1996)
- 21 June – Toni Merkens, German cyclist (died 1944)
- 28 June – Carl Friedrich von Weizsäcker, German physicist (died 2007)
- 30 June – Ludwig Bölkow, German aeronautical pioneers of Germany (died 2003)
- 8 July – Christel Goltz, German operatic soprano (died 2008)
- 9 July
  - Willi Stadel, German gymnast (died [1999)
  - Albrecht Obermaier, German naval officer (died 2004)
- 12 July – Felix Zwolanowski, German international footballer (died 1998)
- 28 July – Charles Augustus, Hereditary Grand Duke of Saxe-Weimar-Eisenach (died 1988)
- 3 August:
  - Fritz Hellwig, German politician (died 2017)
  - Richard Holm, German operatic tenor (died 1988)
- 14 August – Erwin Strittmatter, German writer (died 1994)
- 31 August – Helmut Hamann, German athlete (died 1941)
- 2 September – Ingeborg Rapoport, German pediatrician (died 2017)
- 19 September – Kurt Sanderling, German conductor (died 2011)
- 22 September – Herbert Mataré, German physicist, European co-inventor of the transistor (died 2011)
- 5 October – Karl Hass, German Nazi war criminal (d. 2004)
- 14 October – Albert Richter, German cyclist (died 1940)
- 1 November – Gunther Plaut, German-born Canadian rabbi and writer (died 2013)
- 28 November – Heinz Galinski, President of Central Council of Jews in Germany (died 1992)
- 29 November – Günther Smend, German officer (died 1944)
- Date unknown
  - Hans Metzger, former German diplomat
  - Elisabeth Schmid, German archaeologist and osteologist (died 1994)

== Deaths ==
- 8 January – Friedrich Schrempf, editor and member of the Reichstag (born 1858)
- 5 February – Botho zu Eulenburg (born 1831)
- 8 February – Wilhelm von Hahnke, German fieldmarshall (born 1833)
- 5 March – Rochus von Liliencron, German germanist and historian (born 1820)
- 12 March – Friedrich Karl Wilhelm Dönitz, German physician, anatomist, zoologist and entomologist (born 1838)
- 30 March – Karl May, German writer (born 1842)
- 30 July – Friedrich Schulze, German architect (born 1843)
- 10 August – Paul Wallot, German architect (born 1841)
- 24 September – Adolf Marschall von Bieberstein, German politician (born 1842)
- 10 October – Rudolf Arnold Nieberding, German politician (born 1888)
- 27 October – Friedrich zu Limburg-Stirum, German diplomat and politician (born 1835)
- 22 November – Otto Lessing, German sculptor (born 1846)
- 28 November – Otto Brahm, German drama and literary critic (born 1856)
- 23 December – Otto Schoetensack, German industrialist and later professor of anthropology (born 1850)
- 30 December – Alfred von Kiderlen-Waechter, German diplomat and politician (born 1852)
