= 1911 in Germany =

- Decades: 1890s; 1900s; 1910s; 1920s; 1930s
- See also: Other events of 1911; History of Germany • Timeline • Years

Events in the year 1911 in Germany.

== Incumbents ==
=== National level ===
- Emperor – Wilhelm II
- Chancellor – Theobald von Bethmann Hollweg

=== State level ===
==== Kingdoms ====
- King of Bavaria – Otto
- King of Prussia – Wilhelm II
- King of Saxony – Frederick Augustus III
- King of Württemberg – William II

==== Grand Duchies ====
- Grand Duke of Baden – Frederick II
- Grand Duke of Hesse – Ernest Louis
- Grand Duke of Mecklenburg-Schwerin – Frederick Francis IV
- Grand Duke of Mecklenburg-Strelitz – Adolphus Frederick V
- Grand Duke of Oldenburg – Frederick Augustus II
- Grand Duke of Saxe-Weimar-Eisenach – William Ernest

==== Principalities ====
- Schaumburg-Lippe – George, Prince of Schaumburg-Lippe to 29 April, then Adolf II, Prince of Schaumburg-Lippe
- Schwarzburg-Rudolstadt – Günther Victor, Prince of Schwarzburg
- Schwarzburg-Sondershausen – Günther Victor, Prince of Schwarzburg
- Principality of Lippe – Leopold IV, Prince of Lippe
- Reuss Elder Line – Heinrich XXIV, Prince Reuss of Greiz (with Heinrich XIV, Prince Reuss Younger Line as regent)
- Reuss Younger Line – Heinrich XIV, Prince Reuss Younger Line
- Waldeck and Pyrmont – Friedrich, Prince of Waldeck and Pyrmont

==== Duchies ====
- Duke of Anhalt – Frederick II, Duke of Anhalt
- Duke of Brunswick – Duke John Albert of Mecklenburg (regent)
- Duke of Saxe-Altenburg – Ernst II, Duke of Saxe-Altenburg
- Duke of Saxe-Coburg and Gotha – Charles Edward, Duke of Saxe-Coburg and Gotha
- Duke of Saxe-Meiningen – Georg II, Duke of Saxe-Meiningen

==== Colonial Governors ====
- Cameroon (Kamerun) – Otto Gleim (3rd and final term) to October, then ... Hansen (acting governor)
- Kiaochow (Kiautschou) – Oskar von Truppel to 19 August, then Alfred Meyer-Waldeck
- German East Africa (Deutsch-Ostafrika) – Georg Albrecht Freiherr von Rechenberg
- German New Guinea (Deutsch-Neuguinea) – Albert Hahl (2nd term)
- German Samoa (Deutsch-Samoa) – Wilhelm Solf to 19 December, then Erich Schultz-Ewerth
- German South-West Africa (Deutsch-Südwestafrika) – Theodor Seitz
- Togoland – vacant until 31 March, then Edmund Brückner

== Events ==
- 1 July – The Agadir Crisis is triggered when Germany's Ambassador to France, Wilhelm von Schoen, delivers a diplomatic note to France's Foreign Minister Justin de Selves, announcing that Germany has sent the gunboat SMS Panther and troops, to occupy Agadir, at that time a part of the protectorate of French Morocco. T
- 4 November – The Treaty of Berlin brings the Agadir Crisis to a close. This treaty leads Morocco to be split between France (as a protectorate) and Spain (as the colony of Spanish Sahara), with Germany forfeiting all claims to Morocco. In return, France gives Germany a portion of the French Congo (as Kamerun) and Germany cedes some of German Kamerun to France (as Chad).

== Births ==
- 11 March – Haim Cohn, German-born Israeli jurist and politician (died 2002)
- 29 March
  - Brigitte Horney, actress (died 1988)
  - Freya von Moltke, participant in the anti-Nazi resistance group Kreisauer Kreis (died 2010)
- 6 April – Feodor Felix Konrad Lynen, German biochemist (died 1979)
- 29 May – Leah Goldberg, German-born Israeli poet, author, playwright, translator, and researcher of Hebrew literature (died 1970)
- 15 July – Max Seela, German Waffen-SS officer (died 1999)
- 16 July – Gabriele Wülker, German social scientist and civil servant (died 2001)
- 30 September – Bernd von Brauchitsch, air force officer (died 1974)
- 10 December – Anni Schaad, German jewelry maker (died 1988)
- 14 December – Hans von Ohain, German physicist (died 1998)

== Deaths ==
- 15 February – Theodor Escherich, German-born Austrian pediatrician (b. 1857)
- 18 February – Eduard Reuss, composer and music biographer (born 1851)
- 25 February – Fritz von Uhde, painter (born 1848)
- 17 March – Friedrich Haase, actor (born 1827)
- 29 April – Georg, Prince of Schaumburg-Lippe, nobleman (born 1846)
- 3 August – Reinhold Begas, sculptor (born 1831)
- 1 October – Wilhelm Dilthey, psychologist, sociologist and philosopher (born 1833)
- 15 October – James H. Schmitz, German-born American science fiction writer (d. 1981)
