= 1999 in Germany =

- Decades: 1970s; 1980s; 1990s; 2000s; 2010s
- See also: Other events of 1999; History of Germany • Timeline • Years

Events in the year 1999 in Germany.

== Incumbents ==
- President - Roman Herzog (until 30 June), Johannes Rau (starting 1 July)
- Chancellor – Gerhard Schröder

== Elections ==
- 1999 German presidential election
- 1999 European Parliament election in Germany
- 1999 Brandenburg state election
- 1999 Bremen state election
- 1999 Hessian state election
- 1999 Saarland state election
- 1999 Saxony state election

== Events ==
- January 1 - The Euro Currency officially entered circulation in the digital transaction in the European Union (EU) Eurozone member area countries.
- February 10–21 - 49th Berlin International Film Festival
- March 12 - Germany in the Eurovision Song Contest 1999
- April 1 - German company Infineon Technologies was founded.
- April 12: Wuppertal Suspension Railway accident
- April 19: Reichstag building in Berlin opens the public for the first time in 66 years.
- June 18–20: The 25th G8 summit is held in Cologne.
- July 1: The final parliamentary meeting in Bonn marks the government is officially moved to Berlin.
- November 4: A court in Augsburg filed an arrest warrant for Walther Leisler Kiep due to the CDU donations scandal.
- Date unknown: German company Hoechst AG merged with French company Rhône-Poulenc to form French company Aventis, which was formed to French Company Sanofi in 2004.

== Births ==
- June 11 – Kai Havertz, German footballer
- November 8 – Isaac Bonga, German basketball player

== Deaths ==
- January 2 - Sebastian Haffner, German author and journalist (born 1907)
- January 18 - Günter Strack, German actor (born 1929)
- January 24 - Werner Jacobs German film director (born 1909)
- February 12 - Heinz Schubert, German actor and comedian (born 1925)
- February 19 - Georg Meier, German motorcycle racer (born 1910)
- March 6 - Klaus Gysi, German politician (born 1912)
- April 12 - Helga Seibert, German judge (born 1939)
- April 13 - Willi Stoph, German politician (born 1914)
- May 22 - Alfred Kubel, German politician (born 1909)
- June 23 - Carl Lange, German actor (born 1909)
- June 27 - Siegfried Lowitz, German actor (born 1914)
- July 5 - Harald Philipp, German film director, screenwriter and actor (born 1921)
- July 31 – Max Seela, German Waffen-SS officer (born 1911)
- August 4 - Liselott Linsenhoff, German equestrian (born 1927)
- August 13 - Ignaz Bubis, President of Central Council of Jews in Germany (born 1927)
- August 17 - Reiner Klimke, German equestrian (born 1936)
- August 25 - Georg Thomalla, German actor (born 1915)
- September 20 - Willy Millowitsch, German actor (born 1909)
- October 17 - Franz Peter Wirth, German film director (born 1919)
- October 26 - Rex Gildo, German singer (born 1936)
- November 2 - Ibrahim Böhme, German politician (born 1944)
- November 26 - Angelika Hurwicz, German actress (born 1922)
- December 11 - Harry Wüstenhagen, German actor (born 1928)
- December 30 - Fritz Leonhardt, German structural engineer (born 1909)

== See also ==
- 1999 in German television
