= 1998 in Germany =

- Decades: 1970s; 1980s; 1990s; 2000s; 2010s
- See also: Other events of 1998; History of Germany • Timeline • Years

Events in the year 1998 in Germany.

== Incumbents ==
- President – Roman Herzog
- Chancellor
  - Helmut Kohl (until 27 October 1998)
  - Gerhard Schröder (from 27 October 1998)

== Events ==
- February 11–22 - 48th Berlin International Film Festival
- February 26 - Germany in the Eurovision Song Contest 1998
- June 3 - Eschede train disaster
- September 1 - The German Federal Bureau of Aircraft Accident Investigation is formed.
- October 5 - Lanxess Arena in Cologne is completed.
- October 27 - The First Schröder cabinet led by Gerhard Schröder was sworn in.
- Date unknown - German company Volkswagen Group acquired British company Bentley, and Italian companies Lamborghini and Bugatti by its subsidiary Audi AG.

== Elections ==
- 1998 German federal election
- 1998 Bavarian state election
- 1998 Lower Saxony state election
- 1998 Mecklenburg-Vorpommern state election
- 1998 Saxony-Anhalt state election

== Births ==
- February 11 - Niklas Kaul, German decathlete
- February 12 - Agyemang Diawusie, German footballer (died 2023)
- March 18 - Jamie-Lee Kriewitz, German singer
- July 17 - Lilli Schweiger, German actress

== Deaths ==
- February 1 - Marga Faulstich, German chemist (born 1915)
- February 10 - Erich Mückenberger, German politician (born 1910)
- February 17 - Ernst Jünger, German soldier and author (born 1895)
- February 26 - Otto Haxel, German nuclear physicist (born 1909)
- March 13 - Hans von Ohain, German physicist (born 1911)
- April 2 - Rob Pilatus, German model dancer (born 1964)
- April 3 - Wolf Vostell, German artist (born 1932)
- May 4 - Christine Kurzhals, politician (born 1950)
- May 12 — Hermann Lenz, German poet and author (born 1913)
- August 14 - Hans-Joachim Kulenkampff, German television presenter (born 1921)
- October 30 - Heinz Westphal, German politician (born 1924)
- November 6
  - Niklas Luhmann, German sociologist (born 1927)
  - Wolfgang Stresemann, German jurist, orchestra leader, conductor and composer (born 1904)
- November 26 - Felix Zwolanowski, German international footballer (b. 1912)
- December 9 - Walter Horten, German aircraft pilot (born 1913)
- December 11 - Max Streibl, German politician (born 1932)

== See also ==
- 1998 in German television
