= 1905 in Germany =

- Decades: 1880s; 1890s; 1900s; 1910s; 1920s
- See also: Other events of 1905; History of Germany; Timeline; Years

Events in the year 1905 in Germany.

== Incumbents ==
=== National level ===
- Emperor – Wilhelm II
- Chancellor – Bernhard von Bülow

=== State level ===
==== Kingdoms ====
- King of Bavaria – Otto
- King of Prussia – Wilhelm II
- King of Saxony – Frederick Augustus III
- King of Württemberg – William II

==== Grand Duchies ====
- Grand Duke of Baden – Frederick I
- Grand Duke of Hesse – Ernest Louis
- Grand Duke of Mecklenburg–Schwerin – Frederick Francis IV
- Grand Duke of Mecklenburg–Strelitz – Adolphus Frederick V
- Grand Duke of Oldenburg – Frederick Augustus II
- Grand Duke of Saxe–Weimar–Eisenach – William Ernest

==== Principalities ====
- Schaumburg–Lippe – George, Prince of Schaumburg–Lippe
- Schwarzburg–Rudolstadt – Günther Victor, Prince of Schwarzburg–Rudolstadt
- Schwarzburg–Sondershausen – Karl Günther, Prince of Schwarzburg–Sondershausen
- Principality of Lippe – Alexander, Prince of Lippe with Leopold, Count of Lippe–Biesterfeld as regent, to 25 October, then Leopold IV, Prince of Lippe (who was previously regent)
- Reuss Elder Line – Heinrich XXIV, Prince Reuss of Greiz (regent Heinrich XIV, Prince Reuss Younger Line)
- Reuss Younger Line – Heinrich XIV, Prince Reuss Younger Line
- Waldeck and Pyrmont – Friedrich, Prince of Waldeck and Pyrmont

==== Duchies ====
- Duke of Anhalt – Frederick II, Duke of Anhalt
- Duke of Brunswick – Prince Albert of Prussia (regent)
- Duke of Saxe–Altenburg – Ernst I, Duke of Saxe–Altenburg
- Duke of Saxe–Coburg and Gotha – Charles Edward, Duke of Saxe–Coburg and Gotha
- Duke of Saxe–Meiningen – Georg II, Duke of Saxe–Meiningen

==== Colonial Governors ====
- Cameroon (Kamerun) – Otto Gleim (acting governor) (1st term) to 31 January, then Jesko von Puttkamer (9th term)
- Kiaochow (Kiautschou) – Oskar von Truppel
- German East Africa (Deutsch–Ostafrika) – Gustav Adolf von Götzen
- German New Guinea (Deutsch–Neuguinea) – Albert Hahl (2nd term)
- German Samoa (Deutsch–Samoa) – Wilhelm Solf
- German South–West Africa (Deutsch–Südwestafrika) – Theodor Leutwein to 19 August, then Adrian Dietrich Lothar von Trotha (acting governor) to November, then Friedrich von Lindequist
- Togoland – Waldemar Horn to 27 July, then Johann Nepomuk Graf Zech auf Neuhofen

== Events ==
- 31 March – during the First Moroccan Crisis, Kaiser Wilhelm II of Germany met with representatives of Sultan Abdelaziz of Morocco in Tangier
- 6 June – In Germany's last royal wedding, Crown Prince Wilhelm, son of Kaiser Wilhelm II and heir to the throne, marries Duchess Cecilie of Mecklenburg-Schwerin in Berlin.

=== Date unknown ===
- Germany insists on an international conference on the Moroccan question.
- German company Knorr-Bremse is founded.
- Albert Einstein publishes his four Annus Mirabilis papers. In particular, he formulates the theory of special relativity and states the law of mass–energy conservation: E = mc². He also explains the photoelectric effect by quantization and mathematically analyzes Brownian motion. Because of this, 1905 is said to be the miraculous year for physics, and its 100th anniversary (2005) was declared the World Year of Physics.
- Fritz Schaudinn and Erich Hoffmann discovers the bacterium that is responsible for syphilis—a spiral-shaped spirochete called Treponema pallidum.
- The German Equestrian Federation is founded.

== Births ==
- 20 January – Kurt Waitzmann, German actor (died 1985)
- 3 February – Hermann Henselmann, German architect (died 1995)
- 14 February — Margot Sauerbruch, surgeon, married to Ferdinand Sauerbruch (died 1995)
- 16 February – Karl Frankenstein, German–born Israeli professor (died 1990)
- 15 March – Berthold Schenk Graf von Stauffenberg, aristocrat, lawyer and member of July 20 plot (died 1944)
- 15 March — Alexander Schenk Graf von Stauffenberg, aristocrat and historian (died 1964)
- 15 March – Nikolaus von Halem, German lawyer and businessman (died 1944)
- 16 March – Elisabeth Flickenschildt, German actress (died 1977)
- 19 March — Albert Speer, German architect, member of the NSDAP and war-criminal (died 1981)
- 23 March – Lale Andersen, German singer (died 1972)
- 24 March – Karl John, German actor (died 1977)
- 25 March – Albrecht Mertz von Quirnheim, German Army colonel and a resistance fighter (died 1944)
- 27 March – Rudolf Christoph Freiherr von Gersdorff, officer in the German Army. He attempted to assassinate Adolf Hitler by suicide bombing on 21 March 1943; (died 1980)
- 8 April – Arnulf Klett, German lawyer and politician (died 1974)
- 3 May – Albrecht, Duke of Bavaria, German nobleman (died 1996)
- 6 May – Kurt Schumacher, German sculptor (died 1942)
- 13 May:
  - Theodor Koch, German engineer and weapons manufacturer (died 1976)
  - Walter Richter, German actor (died 1985)
- 27 May – Lilo Milchsack, German promoter of Anglo-German relations (died 1992)
- 14 June – Liesel Bach, German aerobatic pilot (died 1992)
- 3 July – Max Herz, German businessman (died 1965)
- 2 August:
  - Alexander Golling, German actor (died 1989)
  - Karl Amadeus Hartmann, German composer (died 1963)
  - Ernst Kals, German submarine commander (died 1979)
- 15 August – Manfred von Brauchitsch, German racing driver (died 2003)
- 19 September – Theodor Blank, German politician (died 1972)
- 27 September – Ernst Baier, German figure skater (died 2001)
- 1 October – Alfons Goppel, German politician (died 1991)
- 6 October – Wolfgang Liebeneiner, German actor and film director (died 1987)
- 9 November – Erika Mann, German actress and writer (died 1969)
- 10 December – Heinrich Amersdorffer, German painter and printmaker (died 1986)
- 18 December – Hans Bernd von Haeften, German jurist (died 1944)

== Deaths ==
- 14 January – Ernst Abbe, German physicist, optical scientist, entrepreneur, and social reformer (born 1840)
- 1 February – Oswald Achenbach, German painter (born 1827)
- 2 February – Robert Eitner, German musicologist, researcher and bibliographer (born 1832)
- 3 February – Adolf Bastian, German anthropologist (born 1826)
- 6 February – Maria Theresia Bonzel, German nun, founder of the Sisters of St. Francis of Perpetual Adoration (born 1830)
- 9 February – Adolph Menzel, German painter (born 1815)
- 30 March – Georg Meissner, German anatomist and physiologist (born 1829)
- 14 April – Otto Wilhelm von Struve, German-Estonian astronomer (born 1819)
- 17 April – Karl Gutbrod, German judge (born 1844)
- 30 May – Albert Ellmenreich, German actor (born 1816)
- 15 June – Carl Wernicke, German physician, anatomist, psychiatrist and neuropathologist (born 1848)
- 18 June – Hermann Lingg, German poet (born 1820)
- 4 August – Walther Flemming, German biologist (born 1843)
- 6 October – Ferdinand von Richthofen German geographer and scientist (born 1833)
- 15 November – Max Spohr, German publisher (born 1850)
- 17 November – Adolphe, Grand Duke of Luxembourg, German nobleman (born 1817)
- 15 December – Friedrich von Spiegel, German orientalist (born 1820)
