= 1993 in Germany =

- Decades: 1970s; 1980s; 1990s; 2000s; 2010s
- See also: Other events of 1993; History of Germany • Timeline • Years

Events in the year 1993 in Germany.

== Incumbents ==
- President - Richard von Weizsäcker
- Chancellor – Helmut Kohl

== Events ==
- January 18: Focus publishes its first issue.
- February 11: A man hijacks Lufthansa Flight 592.
- April 23: The 1993 World Horticultural Exposition begins in Stuttgart.
- May 28: Solingen arson attack of 1993.
- June 25–27: The first annual Düsseldorfer Jazz-Rally is held.

=== Elections ===
- Hamburg state election, 1993

== Film ==
- 43rd Berlin International Film Festival
- 6th European Film Awards

== Music ==
- Germany in the Eurovision Song Contest 1993

== Births ==
- 20 March - Fabian Fahl, politician
- 13 June - Cansin Köktürk, politician
- 22 June - Loris Karius, footballer
- 17 August - Cinta Laura, Indonesian-German actress and singer
- 22 August - Laura Dahlmeier, biathlete (d. 2025)
- 9 December - Cem Ince, politician

== Deaths ==
- January 15 – Annemarie von Gabain, German linguist (born 1901)
- January 21 – Leo Löwenthal, German sociologist (born 1900)
- January 26 – Baron Axel von dem Bussche, German military officer, member of the anti-Hitler Resistance (born 1919)
- February 5 – Hans Jonas, German philosopher (born 1903)
- March 20 – Polykarp Kusch, German-born American physicist, Nobel Prize laureate (born 1911)
- April 2 – Ernst von Bodelschwingh, German politician (born 1906)
- June 7 – Dražen Petrović, Croatian professional basketball player (born 1964)
- June 12 – Wilhelm Gliese, astronomer (born 1915)
- September 20 – Erich Hartmann, German World War II fighter pilot, highest-scoring fighter ace in world history (born 1922)
- October 1 – Karl Bach, German Olympic fencer (born 1920)
- October 30 – Maria Matray, German screenwriter and actress (born 1907)
- November 18 – Fritz Feld, German actor (born 1900)
- December 7 – Wolfgang Paul, German physicist, Nobel Prize in Physics laureate (born 1913)
