= 2000 in Germany =

- Decades: 1980s; 1990s; 2000s; 2010s; 2020s
- See also: Other events of 2000; History of Germany • Timeline • Years

The following lists events that happened during 2000 in Germany.

== Incumbents ==
=== Federal level ===
- President – Johannes Rau
- Chancellor – Gerhard Schröder

== Events ==
- 9–20 February - 50th Berlin International Film Festival
- 18 February - Germany in the Eurovision Song Contest 2000
- 27 February - Schleswig-Holstein state election, 2000
- 14 May - North Rhine-Westphalia state election, 2000
- 25 July – Air France Flight 4590 crashes near Paris, France shortly after taking off, killing 109 people mostly Germans, and 4 on the ground.
- 30 July - 2000 German Grand Prix at Hockenheimring
- 2 October - German company ProSiebenSat.1 Media was founded.
- Date unknown: German company Mannesmann is taken over by British company Vodafone.
- Date unknown: Fusion of German company VEBA and German company VIAG to German company E.ON

== Sport ==
- 2000 Betty Barclay Cup
- 2000 Faber Grand Prix
- 2000 FIRA Women's European Championship
- 2000 Sparkassen Cup (tennis)
- 2000 WTA German Open
- 2000 German F1 Grand Prix

== Births ==
- 3 January – Juri Knorr, handball player
- 1 December - Sophia Flörsch, racing driver

== Deaths ==
- 4 January - Diether Krebs, German actor and comedian (born 1947)
- 7 January - Klaus Wennemann, German actor (born 1940)
- 8 January - Fritz Thiedemann, German equestrian (born 1918)
- 11 March - Alfred Schwarzmann, German gymnast (born 1912)
- 17 March - Harry Blum, German politician (born 1944)
- 10 April — Walter Stöhrer, German painter (born 1937)
- 21 May - Erich Mielke, German politician (born 1907)
- 22 May - Ernst-Dieter Lueg, journalist (born 1930)
- 21 August - Gustav Scholz, German boxer (born 1930)
- 2 September - Heinz Harmel, German SS officer (born 1906)
- 6 September - Fritz Ruchay, German football player and manager (born 1909)
- 29 September – Walter Dieminger, German space scientist (born 1907)
- 2 October - Harald Wust, German general (born 1921)
- 20 October - Klaus Winter, German judge (born 1936)
- 15 October – Konrad Emil Bloch, biochemist (born 1912)
- 21 November Harald Leipnitz, German actor (born 1926)
- 12 December - Götz Friedrich, German opera and theatre director. (born 1930)
- 13 December -Erhard Krack, German politician (born 1931)
- 27 December - Mark Brandis (Nikolai von Michalewsky), journalist and science fiction author (born 1931)

== See also ==
- 2000 in German television
