= 1994 in Germany =

- Decades: 1970s; 1980s; 1990s; 2000s; 2010s
- See also: Other events of 1994; History of Germany • Timeline • Years

Events in the year 1994 in Germany.

== Incumbents ==
- President - Richard von Weizsäcker (until 30 June), Roman Herzog (starting 1 July)
- Chancellor – Helmut Kohl

== Events ==
- February 10–21 - 44th Berlin International Film Festival
- March 9: Euskirchen court shooting
- March 21 - Germany in the Eurovision Song Contest 1994
- July 28: 3 paintings are stolen from the Kunsthalle Schirn, an event that is now known as Frankfurt art theft of 1994.
- July 29-31: 1994 German Grand Prix.
- November 13: Michael Schumacher becomes Germany's first F1 driver to win the World Championship (While Jochen Rindt was born in Germany, he represented Austria in F1).
- November 15 - The Fifth Kohl cabinet led by Helmut Kohl was sworn in.
- Date unknown - German company Volkswagen Group acquired control of Czech company Škoda.

== Elections ==
- 1994 German federal election
- 1994 German presidential election
- European Parliament election

== Births ==
- January 19 – Matthias Ginter, German football player
- January 27 – Desiree Becker, politician
- February 1 – Anna-Lena Friedsam, tennis player
- February 3 – Malaika Mihambo, German athlete
- March 13 – Yannick Gerhardt, German footballer
- May 14 – Fabian Heinle, German long jumper
- August 17 – Zyon Braun, German politician
- August 27 – Domenic Weinstein, German cyclist
- September 2 – Florian Vogel, German swimmer
- October 14 – Sönke Rothenberger, German equestrian

== Deaths ==
- January 9 - Joachim Werner, German archaeologist (born 1909)
- January 19 - Willi Geiger, German judge (born 1909)
- January 31 - Erwin Strittmatter, German writer (born 1912)
- February 5 - Hermann Josef Abs, German banker (born 1901)
- February 21 - Johannes Steinhoff, German Luftwaffe fighter ace (born 1913)
- March 18 - Günter Mittag, German politician (born 1926)
- March 18 - Peter Borgelt, German actor (born 1927)
- March 27 – Elisabeth Schmid, German archaeologist and osteologist (born 1912)
- April 7 - Golo Mann, German historian, essayist and writer (born 1909)
- April 24 - Margot Trooger, German actress (born 1923)
- June 8 – Fritz Gaiser, German Olympic cross-country skier (1936) (born 1907).
- June 29 – Kurt Eichhorn, German conductor (born 1908)
- July 23 - Klaus Hemmerle, German bishop of Roman Catholic Church (born 1929)
- July 26 - Ernst Schröder, German actor (born 1915)
- August 13 - Manfred Wörner, German politician (born 1934)
- September 10 - Max Morlock, German footballer (born 1925)
- September 26 - Louis Ferdinand, Prince of Prussia, son of Kaiser Wilhelm II (born 1907)
- October 3 - Heinz Rühmann, German actor (born 1902)
- October 16 – Kunigunde Bachl, German physician and politician (born 1919)
- December 9 - Heinz Graffunder, architect (born 1926)
- December 26 - Karl Schiller, German politician (born 1911)
