= 2001 in Germany =

- Decades: 1980s; 1990s; 2000s; 2010s; 2020s
- See also: Other events of 2001; History of Germany • Timeline • Years

The following is a list of events from the year 2001 in Germany.

== Incumbents ==
- President – Johannes Rau
- Chancellor – Gerhard Schröder

== Events ==
- 7–18 February – 51st Berlin International Film Festival
- 2 March – Germany in the Eurovision Song Contest 2001
- 25 March
  - Baden-Württemberg state election, 2001
  - Rhineland-Palatinate state election, 2001
- 13 August – Arena AufSchalke in Gelsenkirchen is opened.
- 23 September – Hamburg state election, 2001
- 21 October – Berlin state election, 2001
- Date unknown – German company ZF Sachs was sold to ZF Friedrichshafen AG, and renamed to ZF Sachs AG.

== Deaths ==
- 14 January – Burkhard Heim, German theoretical physicist (b. 1925)
- 31 January – Heinz Starke, German politician (b. 1911)
- 28 March – Günther Treptow, German opera singer (b. 1907)
- 26 April – Ruth Hellberg, German actress (b. 1906)
- 25 June – Kurt Hoffmann, German film director (b. 1910)
- 5 July – Hannelore Kohl, German first wife of German Chancellor Helmut Kohl (b. 1933)
- 8 July – Ernst Baier, German figure skater (b. 1905)
- 31 July – Friedrich Franz, Hereditary Grand Duke of Mecklenburg-Schwerin (b. 1910)
- 20 September – Karl-Eduard von Schnitzler, German journalist (b. 1918)
- 2 October – Franz Biebl, German composer (b. 1906)
- 5 October – Emilie Schindler, German WWII humanitarian (b. 1907)
- 10 October – Gabriele Wülker, German social scientist and civil servant (b. 1911)
- 13 October – Fritz Fromm, German handball player, Olympic champion (1936) (b. 1913)
- 23 November – Gerhard Stoltenberg, German politician (b. 1928)

== See also ==
- 2001 in German television
