= 1995 in Germany =

- Decades: 1970s; 1980s; 1990s; 2000s; 2010s
- See also: Other events of 1995; History of Germany • Timeline • Years

Events in the year 1995 in Germany.

== Incumbents ==
- President - Roman Herzog
- Chancellor – Helmut Kohl

== Events ==
- 9-22 February - 45th Berlin International Film Festival
- 13 May — Germany in the Eurovision Song Contest 1995
- 14 May — North Rhine-Westphalia state election, 1995
- 30 June — The third series (BBk I/Ia) Deutsche Mark banknotes cease to be legal tender after being in circulation for 30–34 years.
- September - T-Online was founded in Berlin.
- Private company Deutsche Post was founded in Bonn.

== Births ==
- 6 February — Leon Goretzka, German footballer
- 8 February — Joshua Kimmich, German football player
- 16 February — Carina Witthöft, tennis player
- 12 March — Fabian Vogel, German trampoline gymnast
- 1 August — Tina Punzel, German diver
- 26 December — Sarah Vollath, German politician

== Deaths ==
- 9 January — Gisela Mauermayer, German athlete (born 1913)
- 19 January — Hermann Henselmann, German architect (born 1905)
- 28 January — Adolf Butenandt, German chemist (born 1903)
- 1 March — Georges J. F. Köhler, German biologist (born 1946)
- 28 March — Hanns-Joachim Friedrichs, German journalist (born 1927)
- 2 May — Werner Veigel, German journalist and news speaker (born 1928)
- 24 June – Herbert Nürnberg, German boxer (born 1914)
- 31 July — Lotte Rausch, German actress (born 1913)
- 18 August — Helmuth Schlömer, Wehrmacht general (born 1893)
- 28 August — Michael Ende, writer (born 1929)
- 15 September — Dietrich Hrabak, German fighter pilot (born 1914)
- 16 September — Hans Häckermann, German actor (born 1930)
- 29 September — Gerd Bucerius, German journalist (born 1906)
- 26 November — Wim Thoelke, German television presenter (born 1927)
- 18 December — Konrad Zuse, German civil engineer, inventor and computer pioneer (born 1910)
- 30 December — Heiner Müller, German dramatist, poet, writer, essayist and theatre director (born 1929)

== See also ==
- 1995 in German television
