= 1947 in Germany =

- Decades: 1920s; 1930s; 1940s; 1950s; 1960s
- See also: Other events of 1947; History of Germany • Timeline • Years

Events in the year 1947 in Germany.

== Incidents ==
- The Karlslust dance hall fire (also known as Loebel's Restaurant fire) occurred on 8 February 1947.

== Events ==
- January 4 - German magazine Der Spiegel was founded.
- IG Farben Trial
- Flick Trial
- Krupp Trial
- Pohl trial
- Doctors' trial
- Judges' Trial
- Milch Trial
- Hostages Trial

== Births ==
- January 5 - Rita Kühne, German athlete
- January 10 - Peer Steinbrück, German politician
- January 15 - Michael Schanze, German television presenter
- January 20 - Chris Karrer, German musician (died 2024)
- February 14 - Heide Rosendahl, German athlete
- February 20 - Henry Hübchen, German actor
- March 9 - Inge Hecht, German politician (died 2019)
- April 1 - Ingrid Steeger, German comedian (died 2023)
- April 7 - Florian Schneider, German musician (died 2020)
- April 11 - Uli Edel, German film director
- May 3 - Götz Aly, German journalist, historian and political scientist
- May 20 - Sky du Mont, German actor
- May 24 - Martin Winterkorn, German businessman
- June 1 - Konstantin Wecker, German singer-songwriter
- June 6 - Peter Lenk, German sculptor
- June 16 - Gunther Kaufmann, actor (died 2012)
- June 26 - Peter Sloterdijk, German philosoph
- July 20 - Gerd Binnig, German physicist
- July 25 - Mickey Scott, German-born American baseball player (died 2011)
- August 4 - Klaus Schulze, German electronic music pioneer (died 2022)
- August 11 - Diether Krebs, German actor and comedian (died 2000)
- August 27 - Fritz Schramma, German politician
- September 3 - Nikolaus Schneider, German theologian and Protestant bishop
- September 4 - Peter Behrens, German musician (died 2016)
- September 29 - Jörg van Essen, German politician and lawyer
- October 2 - Dieter Pfaff, German actor (died 2013)
- October 26 - Christian Ude, German politician
- October 27 - Gunter Demnig, German artist
- November 29 - Petra Kelly, German politician (died 1992)
- December 2 - Rudolf Scharping, German politician
- December 10 – Rainer Seifert, German hockey player
- December 21 - Hans-Joachim Klein, German political militant (died 2022)

== Deaths ==
- January 3 - Ernst Hardt, German playwright, novelist and poet (born 1876)
- January 31 - Franz Ritter von Epp, German general (born 1868)
- February 1 - Paul Moldenhauer, German lawyer, economist and politician (born 1876)
- February 5 - Hans Fallada, German writer (born 1893)
- February 6 - Max Gülstorff, German actor (born 1882)
- April 1 - Franz Seldte, German co-founder of the German Stahlhelm paramilitary organization, a Nazi politician, and Minister for Labour of the German Reich from 1933 to 1945 (born 1882)
- May 20 - Philipp Lenard, German physicist (born 1862)
- June 22 — Gotthard Fliegel, German geographer (born 1873)
- July 13 - Carl Hoffmann, German film director (born 1885)
- October 4 - Max Planck, German physicist (born 1858)
- November 5 - Fritz Schumacher, German architect (born 1869)
- November 11 - Martin Dibelius, German academic theologian and New Testament professor at the University of Heidelberg (born 1883)
- November 20 - Wolfgang Borchert, German author and playwright (born 1921)
- November 30 - Ernst Lubitsch, German film director (born 1892)
- December 1 - Franz Joseph Emil Fischer, German chemist (born 1877)
- December 3 - Heinrich Hetsch, German physician (born 1873)
- December 25 - Otto Falckenberg, German theatre director and writer (born 1873)
