= 1927 in Germany =

- Decades: 1900s; 1910s; 1920s; 1930s; 1940s
- See also: Other events of 1927; History of Germany • Timeline • Years

Events in the year 1927 in Germany.

== Incumbents ==
=== National level ===
- President - Paul von Hindenburg (Non-partisan)
- Chancellor - Wilhelm Marx (Centre)

== Events ==
- 10 January - The film Metropolis is released.
- 19–21 August - The 3rd Nazi Party Congress is held in Nuremberg and the propaganda film Eine Symphonie des Kampfwillens is made at this rally.
- 16 September - President Paul von Hindenburg repudiates German responsibility for the Great War
- 23 November - Germany and Poland sign a trade pact
- Date unknown:
  - Uncertainty principle introduced by German physicist Werner Heisenberg
  - Emil Lerp invented the transportable gasoline chainsaw.

== Births ==
- 4 January - Claus Jacobi, German journalist (died 2013)
- 5 January - Dieter Henrich, German philosopher (died 2022)
- 12 January - Ignaz Bubis, President of Central Council of Jews in Germany (died 1999)
- 18 January - Werner Liebrich, German international footballer (died 1995)
- 26 January - Hubert Schieth, German football manager (died 2013)
- 28 January - Karl Bögelein, German international footballer and coach (died 2016)
- 31 January - Werner Leich, German bishop of the Evangelical Church in Thuringia (died 2022)
- 2 February - Bruno Flierl, German architect (died 2023)
- 3 February - Friedrich Karl Flick, German industrialist and billionaire (died 2006)
- 4 February - Horst Ehmke, German politician (died 2017)
- 11 February - Dieter Eppler, German television actor (died 2008)
- 13 February - Herbert Pilch, German linguist and celtologist (died 2018)
- 16 February - Ludwig Averkamp, German prelate of Roman Catholic Church (died 2013)
- 21 February - Reinhard Appel, German journalist (died 2011)
- 8 March - Werner Potzernheim, German cyclist (died 2014)
- 11 March - Joachim Fuchsberger, German television presenter and actor (died 2014)
- 13 March - Gabriel Bach, Israeli State Attorney, Eichmann trial prosecutor, jurist, Israeli Supreme Court Justice (1982–1997) (died 2022)
- 15 March - Hanns-Joachim Friedrichs, German journalist (died 1995)
- 21 March - Hans-Dietrich Genscher, German politician (died 2016)
- 24 March - Martin Walser, German writer (died 2023)
- 25 March - Heinz Kunert, German engineer (died 2012)
- 26 March - Bernhard Philberth, German physicist, engineer, philosopher and theologian (died 2010)
- 7 April - Wolfgang Mattheuer, German painter (died 2004)
- 12 April - Günther Leib, opera singer (died 2024)
- 16 April - Pope Benedict XVI (died 2022)
- 17 April - Margot Honecker, German politician (died 2016)
- 18 April - Erwin Eisch, German glass artist (died 2022)
- 1 May - Horst Drinda, German actor (died 2005)
- 4 May - Peter Boenisch, German journalist (died 2005)
- 4 May - Trude Herr, singer (died 1991)
- 5 May - Robert Spaemann, German philosopher (died 2018)
- 9 May
  - Manfred Eigen, German biophysical chemist
  - Wim Thoelke, German television presenter (died 1995)
- 10 May - Albert Friedlander, German rabbi and teacher (died 2004)
- 18 May - Egon Monk, German film director and writer (died 2007)
- 22 May - Hubert Luthe, German bishop of Roman-Catholic Church (died 2014)
- 23 May - Dieter Hildebrandt, German comedian and cabaret artist (died 2013)
- 27 May - Peter Malkin, German-born Israeli Mossad agent who captured Adolf Eichmann (died 2005)
- 29 May - Charlotte Kerr, German actress, writer and journalist (died 2011)
- 30 May - Werner Haas, German motorcycle racer (died 1956)
- 10 June - Hugo Budinger, German field hockey player (died 2017)
- 29 June - Karl Ravens, German politician (died 2017)
- 16 July
  - Lothar Blumhagen, German actor (died 2023)
  - Alois Eisenträger, German footballer (died 2017)
- 18 July - Kurt Masur, German conductor (died 2015)
- 5 August - Rolf Wütherich, German automotive engineer, racing driver and aviator (died 1981)
- 21 August - Wilhelm Killmayer, German composer of classical music, a conductor and an academic teacher (died 2017)
- 23 August - Walter Giller, German actor (died 2011)
- 27 August - Liselott Linsenhoff, German equestrian (died 1999)
- 2 September - Tzvi Avni, German-born Israeli composer
- 20 September - Peter Borgelt, German actor (died 1994)
- 2 October - Uta Ranke-Heinemann, German theologian (died 2021)
- 4 October - Wolf Kahn, German-American painter (died 2020)
- 5 October - Rolf Herricht, German actor and comedian (died 1981)
- 16 October - Günter Grass, Danzig-born writer, recipient of the Nobel Prize in Literature (died 2015)
- 17 October - Friedrich Hirzebruch, German mathematician (died 2012)
- 19 October - Hans Schäfer, German footballer (died 2017)
- 27 October - Thomas Nipperdey, German historian (died 1992)
- 1 November - Marcel Ophuls, German documentary film maker
- 5 November - Armin Weiss, German chemist and politician (died 2010)
- 9 November - Shlomo "Chich" Lahat, German-born Israeli general and politician serving as the 8th mayor of Tel Aviv
- 21 November - Barbara Rütting, German actress
- 8 December - Niklas Luhmann, German sociologist (died 1998)
- 31 December - Dieter Noll, German writer (died 2008)

== Deaths ==
- January 3 - Carl Runge, German mathematician and physicist (born 1856)
- January 10 - Heinrich von Gossler, German general (born 1841)
- January 30 - Friedrich Koch, German teacher, composer, cellist (born 1862)
- February 16 - Carl von Opel, German automotive pioneer (born 1869)
- April 30 - Friedrich von Scholtz, German general (born 1854)
- May 5 - Franziska Tiburtius, German doctor (born 1843)
- May 26 - Hermann von Stein, German general (born 1854)
- July 5 - Albrecht Kossel, German biochemist and pioneer in the study of genetics. (born 1853)
- July 8 - Max Hoffmann, German general (born 1869)
- October 18 - Ludwig Darmstaedter, German chemist (born 1845)
- October 20 - Eugen von Knilling, German politician (born 1856)
- October 30 - Maximilian Harden, German journalist (born 1861)
