= 1998 in German television =

This is a list of German television related events from 1998.

== Events ==
- 5 January - British children's television series Thomas the Tank Engine & Friends begins airing on German television for the first time ever after only being released on home video since 1995. The series will begin airing on RTL II.
- 27 February - Guildo Horn is selected to represent Germany at the 1998 Eurovision Song Contest with his song "Guildo hat euch lieb!". He is selected to be the forty-third German Eurovision entry during Countdown Grand Prix held at the Stadthalle in Bremen.

== Debuts ==
=== Free for air ===
==== Domestic ====
- 13 January - The King of St. Pauli (1998) (Sat.1)
- 21 April - Der Clown (1998–2001) (RTL)
- 4 September - Schloss Einstein (1998–present) (KiKA)
- 26 October - In aller Freundschaft (1998–present) (Das Erste)
- 20 November - Der Laden (1998) (Arte)

==== International ====
- 5 January - (United Kingdom) Thomas the Tank Engine & Friends (1984–present) (RTL II)
- 28 March - (United States) / (Canada) Beast Wars: Transformers (1996–1999) (RTL II)
- 14 April - (United States) Extreme Dinosaurs (1997) (Super RTL)
- 23 June - (United Kingdom) PB Bear and Friends (1998) (KiKA)
- 9 October - (United States) Buffy the Vampire Slayer (1997–2003) (ProSieben)
- 28 November - (United States) Moesha (1996–2001) (RTL)
- 10 December - (United Kingdom) The Adventures of Spot (1987–1993) (KiKA)
- 21 December - (Canada) / (France) Animal Crackers (1997–1999) (KiKA)
- 24 December - (United Kingdom) Percy the Park Keeper (1996–1999) (Das Erste)

=== Cable ===
==== International ====
- 2 May - (United States) The Angry Beavers (1997–2001) (Nickelodeon)

=== American Forces Network ===
- (Australia) Bananas in Pajamas (1992–2001)
- (United States) The Journey of Allen Strange (1997–2000)

=== BFBS ===
- 31 March - (United Kingdom) The Wombles (1998–2001)
- 12 August - (United Kingdom) Whizziwig (1998–2000)
- 29 November - (United Kingdom) Dinnerladies (1998–2000)
- (France) / (United Kingdom) Archibald the Koala (1998–2000)
- (United Kingdom) Animal Stories (1998–2002)

== Television shows ==
=== 1950s ===
- Tagesschau (1952–present)

=== 1960s ===
- heute (1963–present)

=== 1970s ===
- heute-journal (1978–present)
- Tagesthemen (1978–present)

=== 1980s ===
- Wetten, dass..? (1981–2014)
- Lindenstraße (1985–present)

=== 1990s ===
- Gute Zeiten, schlechte Zeiten (1992–present)
- Marienhof (1992–2011)
- Unter uns (1994–present)
- Verbotene Liebe (1995–2015)

== Networks and services ==
=== Launches ===
Network	Type	Launch date	Notes	Source
EarthTV	Cable television	Unknown		
BR-alpha	Cable television	7 January		
13th Street	Cable television	1 May		
NBC Europe	Cable television	30 June		
SR Fernsehen	Cable television	1 September		

=== Conversions and rebrandings ===
Old network name	New network name	Type	Conversion Date	Notes	Source
Sudwest 3	Sudwest Fernsehen	Cable television	Unknown		

== Deaths ==
Date	Name	Age	Cinematic Credibility
19 March	Klaus Havenstein	75	German actor, cabaret artist & TV host
14 August	Hans-Joachim Kulenkampff	77	German actor & TV host

== See also ==
- 1998 in Germany
