= 1906 in Germany =

- Decades: 1880s; 1890s; 1900s; 1910s; 1920s
- See also: Other events of 1906; History of Germany • Timeline • Years

Events in the year 1906 in Germany.

== Incumbents ==
=== National level ===
- Emperor – Wilhelm II
- Chancellor – Bernhard von Bülow

=== State level ===
==== Kingdoms ====
- King of Bavaria – Otto
- King of Prussia – Wilhelm II
- King of Saxony – Frederick Augustus III
- King of Württemberg – William II

==== Grand Duchies ====
- Grand Duke of Baden – Frederick I
- Grand Duke of Hesse – Ernest Louis
- Grand Duke of Mecklenburg-Schwerin – Frederick Francis IV
- Grand Duke of Mecklenburg-Strelitz – Adolphus Frederick V
- Grand Duke of Oldenburg – Frederick Augustus II
- Grand Duke of Saxe-Weimar-Eisenach – William Ernest

==== Principalities ====
- Schaumburg-Lippe – George, Prince of Schaumburg-Lippe
- Schwarzburg-Rudolstadt – Günther Victor, Prince of Schwarzburg-Rudolstadt
- Schwarzburg-Sondershausen – Karl Günther, Prince of Schwarzburg-Sondershausen
- Principality of Lippe – Leopold IV, Prince of Lippe
- Reuss Elder Line – Heinrich XXIV, Prince Reuss of Greiz (regent Heinrich XIV, Prince Reuss Younger Line)
- Reuss Younger Line – Heinrich XIV, Prince Reuss Younger Line
- Waldeck and Pyrmont – Friedrich, Prince of Waldeck and Pyrmont

==== Duchies ====
- Duke of Anhalt – Frederick II, Duke of Anhalt
- Duke of Brunswick – Prince Albert of Prussia (regent) to 13 September, then vacant
- Duke of Saxe-Altenburg – Ernst I, Duke of Saxe-Altenburg
- Duke of Saxe-Coburg and Gotha – Charles Edward, Duke of Saxe-Coburg and Gotha
- Duke of Saxe-Meiningen – Georg II, Duke of Saxe-Meiningen

==== Colonial Governors ====
- Cameroon (Kamerun) – Jesko von Puttkamer (9th and final term) to January, then Oberst Müller (acting governor) to November, then Otto Gleim (acting governor) (2nd term)
- Kiaochow (Kiautschou) – Oskar von Truppel
- German East Africa (Deutsch-Ostafrika) – Gustav Adolf von Götzen to 15 April, then Georg Albrecht Freiherr von Rechenberg
- German New Guinea (Deutsch-Neuguinea) – Albert Hahl (2nd term)
- German Samoa (Deutsch-Samoa) – Wilhelm Solf
- German South-West Africa (Deutsch-Südwestafrika) – Friedrich von Lindequist
- Togoland – Johann Nepomuk Graf Zech auf Neuhofen

== Births ==
- 2 February – Dietrich Bonhoeffer, German theologian (died 1945)
- 17 February – Käte Selbmann, German politician (died 1962)
- 3 March – Will Eisenmann, German-Swiss composer (died 1992)
- 19 May – Gerd Bucerius, German journalist (died 1995)
- 30 May – Bruno Gröning, German faith healer (died 1959)
- 6 June – Max August Zorn, German-born American mathematician (died 1993)
- 19 June – Ernst Boris Chain, German biochemist (died 1979)
- 28 June – Maria Goeppert-Mayer, German theoretical physicist, and Nobel laureate in Physics (died 1972)
- 29 June – Heinz Harmel, German SS officer (died 2000)
- 2 July – Hans Bethe, German-born American physicist, Nobel Prize laureate (died 2005)
- 25 August — Eugen Gerstenmaier, theologian, politician, part of the Kreisauer Kreis and Bundestagspräsident of Germany (died 1986)
- 1 September – Franz Biebl, German composer (died 2001)
- 14 October – Hannah Arendt, German political theorist and writer (died 1975)
- 14 November – Albrecht Becker, German production designer, photographer, and actor (died 2002)
- 18 November – Klaus Mann, German writer (died 1949)
- 25 December – Ernst Ruska, German physicist, Nobel Prize in Physics (died 1988)
- Date unknown:
  - Josef Stürmann, a Munich philosopher (died 1959)

== Deaths ==
- 8 February – Wilhelm von Christ, (born 1831)
- 10 February – Anton Hermann Albrecht, German poet (born 1835)
- 19 February – Wilhelm Heyd, German historian (born 1823)
- 8 March – Hermann Rogalla von Bieberstein, German-American engineer and politician (born 1823)
- 10 March – Eugen Richter, German politician (born 1838)
- 17 March – Johann Most, German-American anarchist (born 1846)
- 21 March – Carl von Siemens, German industrialist (born 1829)
- 14 May – Carl Schurz, German revolutionary and US statesman (born 1829)
- 27 May – Erich Zweigert, German politician (born 1849)
- 5 June – Eduard von Hartmann, German philosopher (born 1842)
- 5 July – Paul Karl Ludwig Drude, German physician (born 1863)
- 25 August – Max von Eyth, German engineer (born 1836)
- 13 September – Prince Albert of Prussia, Prussian general field marshal and regent of the Duchy of Brunswick (born 1837)
- 19 October – Karl Pfizer, German chemist (born 1824)
- 22 October – Emil Ludwig Schmidt, German anthropologist (born 1837)
- 7 November – Heinrich Seidel, German engineer (born 1842)
- 31 December – Friedrich Gumpert, German professor (born 1841)
