= 1989 in Germany =

Events in the year 1989 in West Germany and East Germany.

== Incumbents ==
=== West Germany ===
- President - Richard von Weizsäcker
- Chancellor – Helmut Kohl

=== East Germany ===
- Head of State – Erich Honecker (until 18 October), Egon Krenz (starting 18 October; until 6 December), Manfred Gerlach (starting 6 December)
- Head of Government – Willi Stoph (until 13 November), Hans Modrow (starting 13 November)

== Events ==
- Monday demonstrations in East Germany
- Die Wende and Peaceful Revolution
- 10–21 February - 39th Berlin International Film Festival
- 23 March - Germany in the Eurovision Song Contest 1989
- 20–30 July - The World Games take place in Karlsruhe.
- 19 August - Pan-European Picnic
- 7 October - East German Republic Day Parade of 1989
- 9 November - Fall of the Berlin Wall
- 4 December - First citizens' occupation of a Stasi building

== Births ==
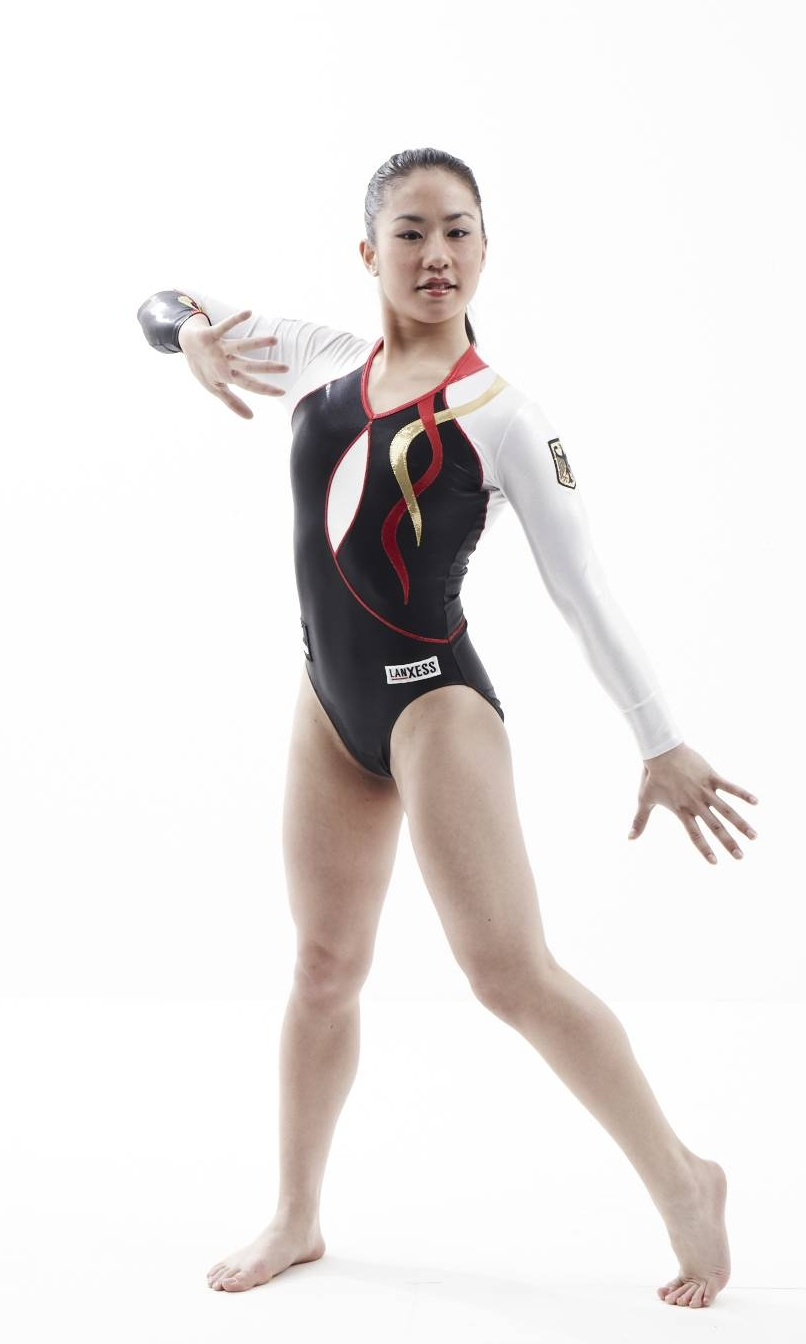
Kim Bui

- January 9 - Stefan Reinartz, footballer
- January 20 - Kim Bui, German artistic gymnast
- March 9 - Patrick Hausding, German swimmer
- April 27
  - Lars Bender, German footballer
  - Sven Bender, German footballer
- September 1
  - Bill Kaulitz, German singer, band Tokio Hotel
  - Tom Kaulitz, German musician, band Tokio Hotel
- August 4 - Daniel Jasinski, German discus thrower
- August 21 - Cindy Roleder, German athlete
- September 13 - Thomas Müller, German football player
- September 28 - Raphael Holzdeppe, German pole vaulter
- December 10 - Maria Kurjo, German swimmer

== Deaths ==
- January 14 - Robert Lembke, German television presenter, game show host (born 1913)
- February 13 - Hans Hellmut Kirst, German novelist (born 1914)
- February 26 - Alexander Golling, German actor (born 1905)
- April 18 - Hilde Benjamin, German judge and politician (born 1902)
- May 18 - Hermann Höcherl, German politician (born 1912)
- May 23 - Karl Koch, German hacker (born 1965)
- June 9 - Wolfdietrich Schnurre, German writer (born 1920)
- July 20 - Erwin Sietas, German swimmer (born 1910)
- September 14 - Hans Georg Rupp, German judge (born 1907)
- October 24 - Alex Seidel, German weapons manufacturer (born 1909)
- November 1 - Hoimar von Ditfurth, German physician and scientific journalist (born 1921)
- November 30 - Alfred Herrhausen, German banker (born 1930)
- December 8 - Max Grundig, German entrepreneur (born 1908)
- December 20 – Kurt Böhme, German bass (born 1908)
- December 31 - Gerhard Schröder, German politician (born 1910)

== See also ==
- 1989 in German television
