= 2017 in Germany =

- Decades: 1990s; 2000s; 2010s; 2020s; 2030s
- See also: Other events of 2017; History of Germany • Timeline • Years

This list details notable events occurring in 2017 in Germany. Major events included the death of Helmut Kohl, the legalization of same-sex marriage and the Alternative for Germany (AfD) enters the Bundestag for the first time.

== Incumbents ==
- President:
  - Joachim Gauck (until 18 March 2017)
  - Frank-Walter Steinmeier (from 18 March 2017)
- Chancellor: Angela Merkel

== Events ==
=== January ===
- January – 2016–2017 Tour de Ski
- January – 2016–2017 Biathlon World Cup – World Cup 4
- January – 2016–2017 Biathlon World Cup – World Cup 5
- 11 January – Elbphilharmonie in Hamburg opened.
- 20 January – Museum Barberini in Potsdam opened.

=== February ===
- 1–5 February – 2017 German Masters
- 9–18 February – 67th Berlin International Film Festival
- 9 February – Germany in the Eurovision Song Contest 2017
- 12 February – 2017 German presidential election

=== March ===
- CeBIT in Hanover
- ITB Berlin in Berlin
- Leipzig Book Fair in Leipzig
- Germany in the Eurovision Song Contest 2017
- In March 2017, French company Groupe PSA agreed to buy German company Opel and its English sister brand Vauxhall and their European auto lending business from General Motors for US$2.2 billion,
- 9 March – 2017 Düsseldorf axe attack
- 26 March – 2017 Saarland state election

=== April ===
- Hanover Messe in Hanover
- Deutscher Filmpreis in Berlin
- 7 April – Opening of Internationale Gartenausstellung 2017

=== May ===
- 7 May – 2017 Schleswig-Holstein state election
- 14 May – 2017 Nordrhein-Westfalen state election
- 29 May – 5 June – 2017 World Table Tennis Championships

=== June ===
- Kiel Week in Kiel
- Rosenhang Museum in Weilburg opened.
- 10 June – September Documenta 14
- Merger of German company The Linde Group and Praxair.
- 27 June – Armin Laschet become Minister-president of North Rhine-Westphalia.
- 28 June – Daniel Günther become Minister-president of Schleswig-Holstein.
- 30 June – The Bundestag voted to make same-sex marriage legal.

=== July ===
- 4 July – Manuela Schwesig become Minister-president of Mecklenburg-Vorpommern.
- 6 July - The Transparency in Wage Structures Act goes into effect.
- 7–8 July – 2017 G20 Hamburg summit
- 28 July – 2017 Hamburg attack
- 30 July – Konstanz shooting

=== August ===
- Hanse Sail in Rostock
- Internationale Funkausstellung Berlin in Berlin
- 15 August – Air Berlin files for bankruptcy.
- 18 August – Bain Capital and Cinven acquired German company Stada Arzneimittel.

=== September ===
- 24 September – 2017 German federal election
  - The (CDU/CSU), led by incumbent chancellor Angela Merkel, wins the highest percentage of the vote with 33%, though it suffered a large swing against it of more than 8%.
  - The Social Democratic Party of Germany (SPD) achieved its worst result since post-war Germany at 21%.
  - The Alternative for Germany (AfD), which was previously unrepresented in the Bundestag, became the third largest party in the Bundestag with 12.6% of the vote. It was the first time since 1957 that a party to the political right of the CDU/CSU gained seats in the Bundestag.
- ILA Berlin Air Show in Berlin
- Gamescom in Cologne
- Frankfurt Motor Show in Frankfurt
- September – October – Oktoberfest in Munich

=== October ===
- Frankfurt Book Fair in Frankfurt
- 15 October – 2017 Lower Saxony state election

=== December ===
- 1 December – 2017 World Women's Handball Championship
- December – German company Hamburg Süd is sold to Danish company Maersk.

== Deaths ==
=== January ===
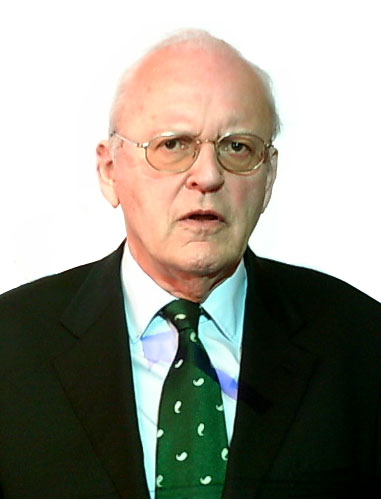
Roman Herzog

- 4 January: Heinz Billing, German physicist and computer scientist (b. 1914).
- 10 January: Roman Herzog, German politician, former president (born 1934)
- 13 January: Udo Ulfkotte, German journalist and political scientist (born 1960)
- 14 January: Herbert Mies, German politician (born 1929)
- 16 January: Franz Jarnach, German actor and musician. (born 1943)
- 20 January: Klaus Huhn, German journalist, writer and sports administrator (born 1928)
- 26 January: Michael Tönnies, German football player (born 1959)
- 27 January: Brunhilde Pomsel, German broadcaster and secretary to Joseph Goebbels (b. 1911).

=== February ===
- 6 February: Inge Keller, German actress (born 1923)
- 15 February: Manfred Kaiser, German footballer (born 1929)

=== March ===
- 12 March: Horst Ehmke, German politician (born 1927)
- 23 March: Ingeborg Rapoport, German paediatrician (b. 1912)
- 28 March: Christine Kaufmann, German actress (born 1945)

=== April ===
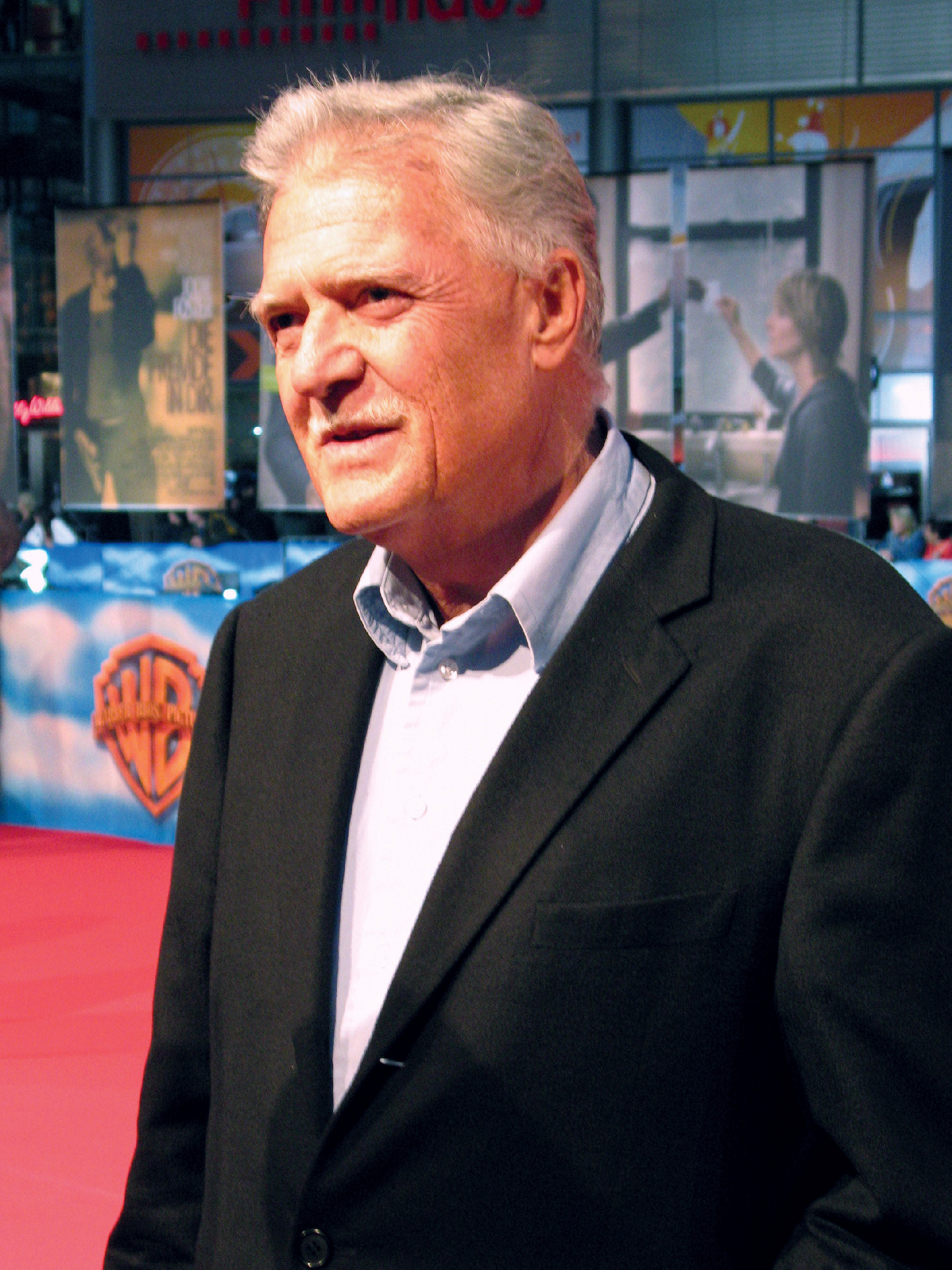
Michael Ballhaus

- 9 April: Dieter Kottysch, German boxer (born 1943)
- 11 April: Michael Ballhaus, German cinematographer (born 1935)

=== May ===
- 2 May: Heinz Kessler, German politician, military officer and a convicted felon (born 1920)
- 11 May: Helga Haller von Hallerstein, German politician (born 1927)
- 15 May: Karl-Otto Apel, German philosopher (born 1922)
- 16 May: Gunnar Möller, German actor (born 1928)
- 20 May: Paul Falk, Germann pair skater (born 1921)

=== June ===
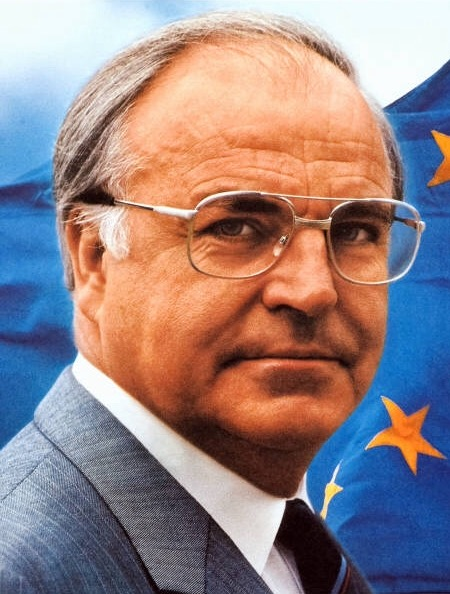
Helmut Kohl

- 1 June: Tankred Dorst, German playwright and storyteller (born 1925)
- 11 June: Alexandra Kluge, German actress and physician (born 1937)
- 16 June: Helmut Kohl, German politician, former chancellor (born 1930)
- 22 June: Gunter Gabriel, Germann singer, musician and composer (born 1942)

=== July ===
- 10 July: Peter Härtling, German writer, poet, publisher and journalist. (born 1933)
- 20 July: Andrea Jürgens German singer (born 1967)
- 22 July: Fritz Hellwig, German politician (born 1912)
- 26 July: Constantin Heereman von Zuydtwyck, German politician (born 1931)

=== August ===
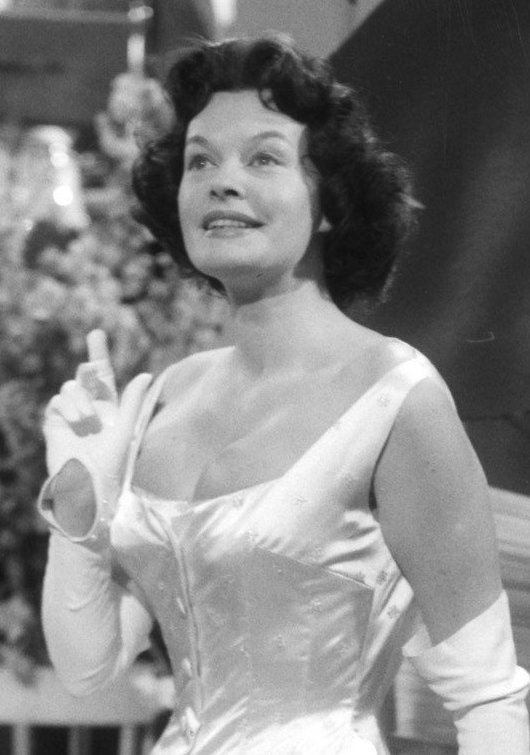
Margot Hielscher at the Eurovision Song Contest 1958

- 5 August: Martin Roth, German museum director (born 1955)
- 10 August: Ruth Pfau, German physician and nun (born 1929)
- 15 August: Eberhard Jäckel, German historian (born 1929)
- 19 August: Karl Otto Götz, German painter (b. 1914)
- 20 August: Margot Hielscher, German actress and singer (born 1919)
- 20 August: Wilhelm Killmayer, German composer of classical music, a conductor and an academic teacher (born 1927)
- 24 August: Axel Bernstein, German politician (born 1974)

=== September ===
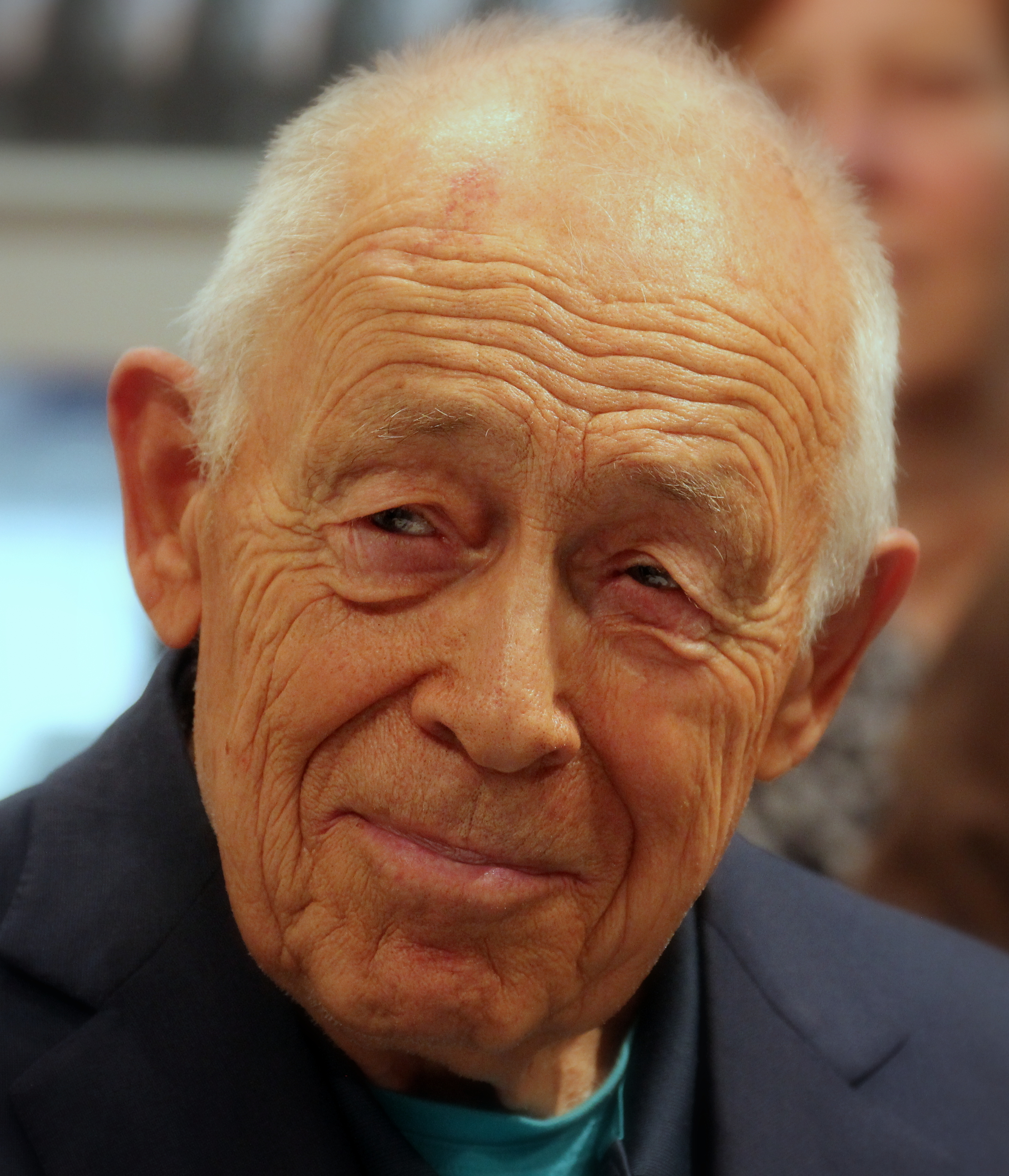
Heiner Geißler

- 8 September: Karl Ravens, German politician (born 1927)
- 12 September: Heiner Geißler, German politician (born 1930)
- 15 September: Albert Speer Jr., German architect (born 1934)
- 27 September: Joy Fleming, German singer (born 1944)
- 28 September: Andreas Schmidt, German actor (born 1963)

=== October ===
- 7 October: Hugo Budinger, German field hockey player (born 1927)
- 11 October: Karl-Heinz Kipp, German entrepreneur (born 1924)

=== November ===
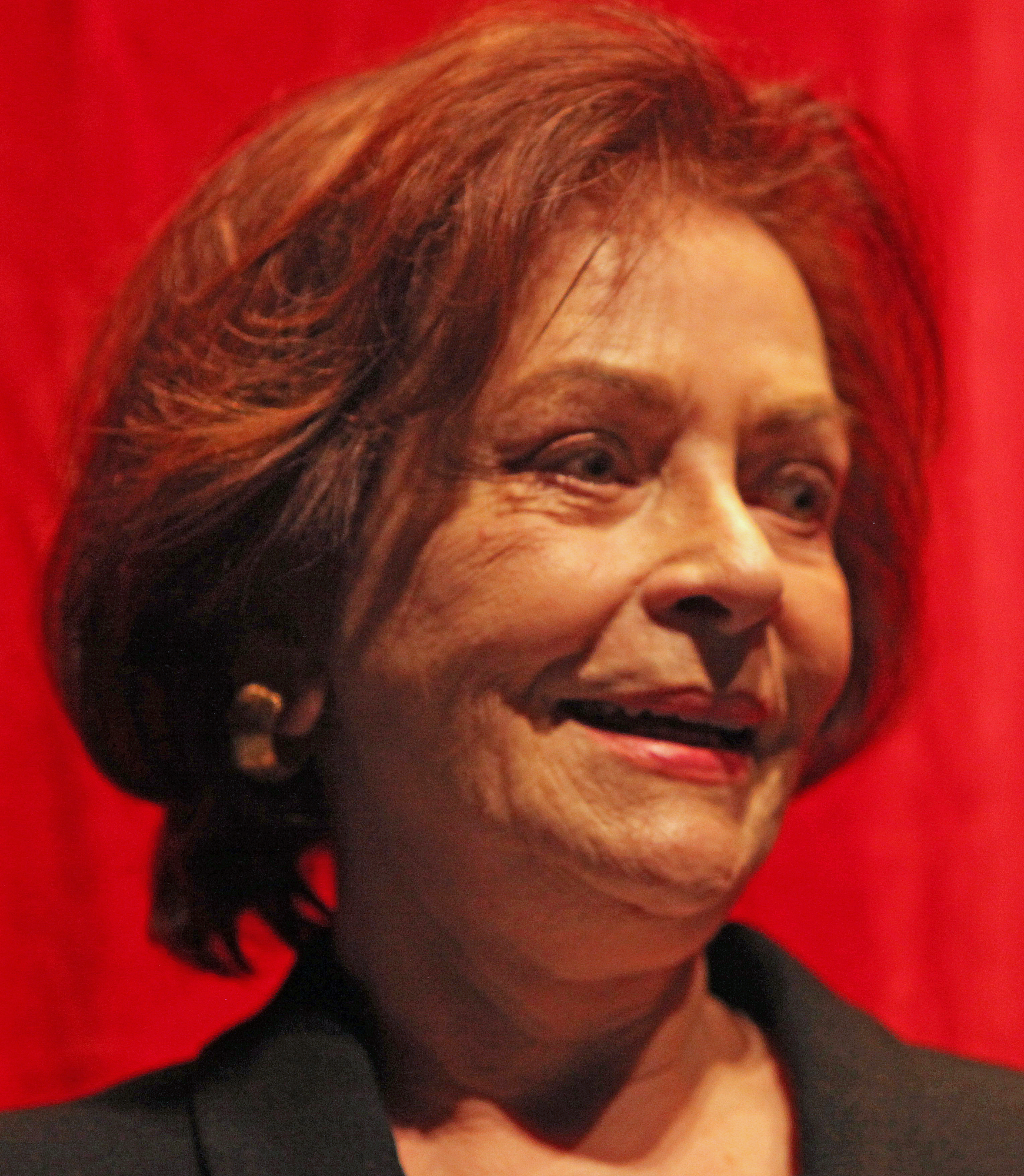
Karin Dor

- 5 November: Lothar Thoms, German track cyclist (born 1956)
- 6 November: Karin Dor, German actress (born 1938)
- 7 November: Hans-Michael Rehberg, German actor (born 1938)
- 7 November: Hans Schäfer, German footballer (born 1927)
- 20 November: Dieter Bellmann, German actor (born 1940)
- 21 November: Peter Berling, German actor (born 1934)

=== December ===
- 3 December: Elmar Faber, German book publisher (born 1934)
- 25 December: Erich Kellerhals, German businessman (born 1939)
- 30 December: Bernd Spier, German singer (born 1944)

== See also ==
- 2017 in German television
