= Walter Sturman =

English cricketer (1882–1958)

Personal information
- Full name: Walter Sturman
- Born: 29 August 1882; Leicester, Leicestershire, England
- Died: 24 July 1958 (aged 75); Aylestone, Leicestershire, England
- Batting: Right-handed
- Role: Wicket-keeper

Domestic team information
- Years: Team
- 1909–1912: Leicestershire

Career statistics
Competition	First-class
Matches	24
Runs scored	273
Batting average	10.11
100s/50s	–/–
Top score	46
Balls bowled	–
Wickets	–
Bowling average	–
5 wickets in innings	–
10 wickets in match	–
Best bowling	–
Catches/stumpings	28/5
- Source: Cricinfo, 20 June 2012

Walter Sturman (29 August 1882 – 24 July 1958) was an English cricketer. Sturman was a right-handed batsman who fielded as a wicket-keeper. He was born at Leicester, Leicestershire.

Sturman made his first-class debut for Leicestershire against Kent at Aylestone Road in the 1909 County Championship. He made 23 further first-class appearances for the county, the last of which came against the touring Australians in 1912. In his 24 first-class matches for Leicestershire, he scored 273 runs at an average of 10.11, with a high score of 46. Behind the stumps he took 28 catches and made five stumpings.

He died at Aylestone, Leicestershire, on 24 July 1958.
