= Bavaria 09 Berlin =

German football club

- Full name: Berliner Sportclub Bavaria 1909
- Founded: 1909
- Dissolved: 1933
Home colours	Away colours

Bavaria 09 Berlin was a short-lived German association football club from the city of Berlin. Established in 1909, the club disappeared in 1933. They played a single season in the top flight Oberliga Berlin in 1921–22 and were sent down after an 11th-place finish. In 1927 the club joined the Märkische Spielvereinigung, a regional worker's sports club and an ATSB member, but split from it the next year. From 1930 to February 1933 Bavaria was a member of an ATSB splinter group and communist-leaning Kampfgemeinschaft für Rote Sporteinheit ("Rotsport"). Subsequently, it was disbanded like most other worker's or left-leaning clubs with the formation of Nazi Germany.
