= Robert von Pöhlmann =

German historian (1852–1914)

Robert von Pöhlmann (31 October 1852 in Nuremberg – 27 September 1914 in Munich) was a German ancient historian (German: Althistoriker).

From 1870 to 1874, he studied classical philology and history at the Ludwig-Maximilians-Universität München, the University of Göttingen, and Leipzig University. While a student, his influences included Georg Waitz at the University of Göttingen and Wilhelm Roscher at Leipzig University. In 1884, he became an associate professor at the University of Erlangen, where in 1886 he attained a full professorship. From 1901 onward, he was a professor of ancient history at the Ludwig-Maximilians-Universität München.

== Literary works ==
- Die Uebervölkerung der antiken Großstädte, 1884 – The overpopulation of ancient cities.
- Grundriss der griechischen Geschichte, 1909 – Outline of Greek history.
- Geschichte des antiken Kommunismus und Sozialismus, 2 volumes, 1893-1901 – History of ancient communism and socialism.
- Geschichte der sozialen Frage und des Sozialismus in der antiken Welt, 2 volumes, 1912 – History of social issues and of socialism in the ancient world.

He was responsible for editions 22–24 of Roscher's Grundlagen der Nationalökonomie.
