= BFC Nord 08 Berlin =

German football club

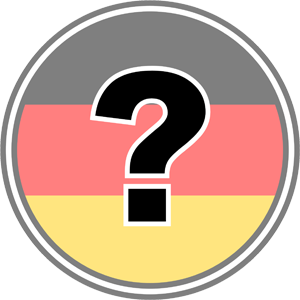
- Full name: Berliner Fußball-Club Nord 08 Berlin
- Founded: 1908
- Dissolved: 1945
- Ground: Lindauer Straße Reickendorf-Ost
Home colours	Away colours

Berliner Fußball-Club Nord 08 Berlin was a German association football club from the city of Berlin. Founded in 1908, the club was active through to the end of World War II.

BFC Nord enjoyed its greatest success in 1920s when they played two seasons (1921–22, 1923–24) in the first division Oberliga Berlin. Both campaigns ended in relegation after 10th-place finishes. The club also made two appearances in the Berliner Pokal (Berlin Cup), going out to BBC Brandenburg 92 Berlin in the quarterfinals in 1923 and to Union 06 Oberschöneweide in the quarterfinals in 1926.

In 1930, BFC Nord merger with Sport-Club Niederschönhausen 05 and VfR 07 Berlin to form Nördliche SpVgg 1905 Niederschönhausen. The club was part of lower tier city competition until it was lost in 1945 in the aftermath of the war.
