= Theodor Weber (physician) =

German physician (1829–1914)

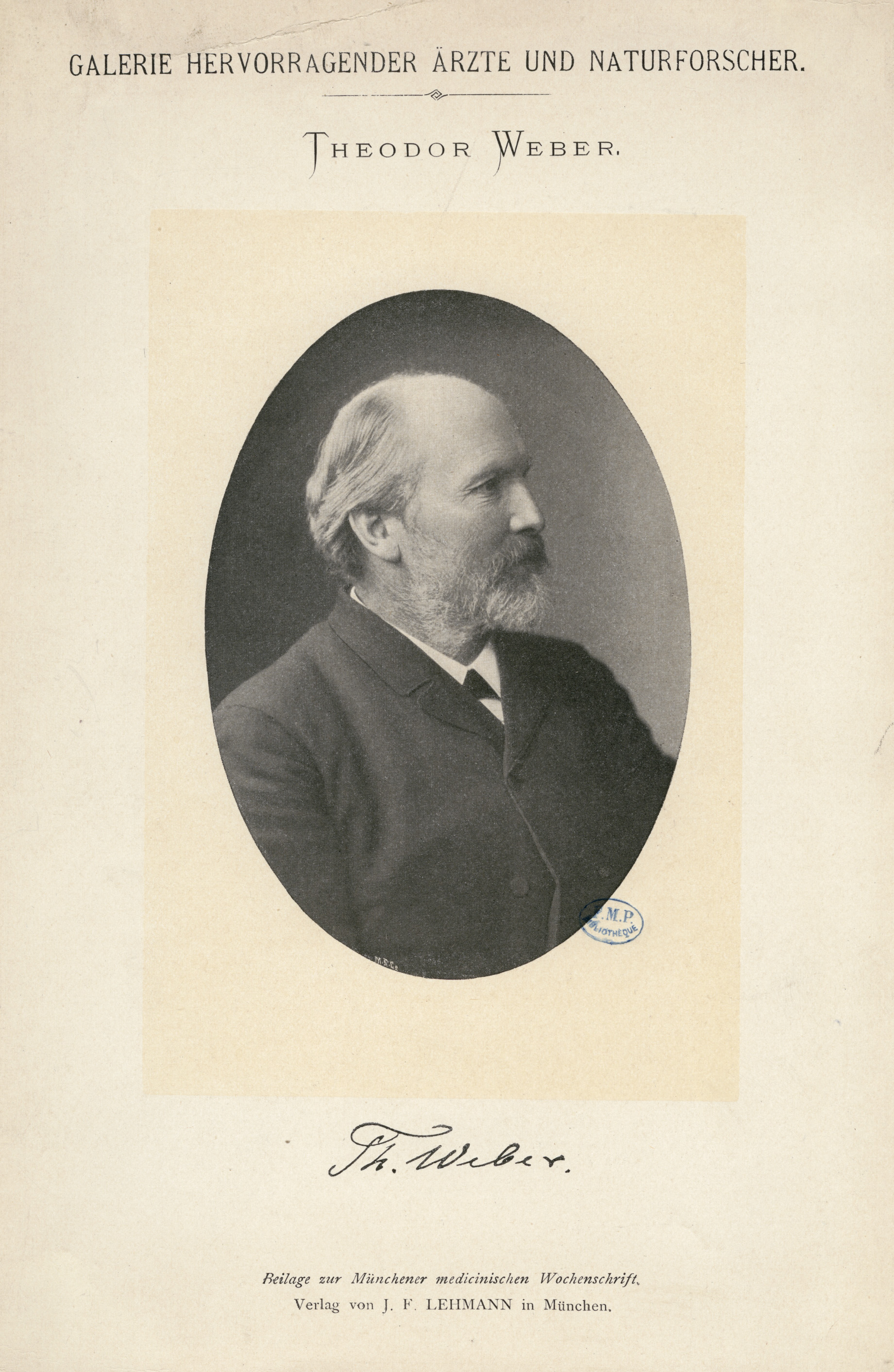
- Born: 28 August 1829; Leipzig, Kingdom of Prussia
- Died: 4 September 1914 (aged 85); Halle an der Saale, Kingdom of Prussia, German Empire
- Education: Leipzig University; University of Göttingen
- Scientific career
- Workplaces: University of Halle; Leipzig University

Theodor Weber (28 August 1829 in Leipzig – 4 September 1914 in Halle an der Saale) was a German physician. He was the son of physiologist Ernst Heinrich Weber (1795–1878).

== Education ==
He studied medicine at the Universities of Göttingen and Leipzig, earning his doctorate at the latter institution in 1854 with the thesis "De causis streptiuum in vasis sanguiferis oberservatum". The following year he received his habilitation, subsequently serving as a privat-docent of internal medicine at the University of Leipzig.

== Career ==
From 1859 to 1861 he was an associate professor at Leipzig, afterwards relocating to the University of Halle, where he was a full professor of pathology and therapy from 1862 to 1899. At Halle, he was also director of the university medical clinic.

A number of his treatises in pathology and physiology were published in the "Archiv für physiologische Heilkunde" and "Verhandlungsberichte des Kongresses fur innere Medizin". He is credited for developing a specialized douche for nasal irrigation (Weber's douche).

== Writings ==
- Physikalische und physiologische Experimente über die Entstehung der Geräusche in den Blutgefässen, 1855 – Physical and physiological experiments on the origin of noises in the blood vessels.
- Ueber den Mangel des Tastsinnes an Theilen, die von der Haut entblösst sind – On the lack of touch sensation on body parts denuded of skin.
- Zur Theorie des Bronchial-Asthmas, 1873 – On the theory of bronchial asthma.
- Über die operative Therapie der Pleuritis, 1886 – On operative therapy of pleuritis.
