= Carlo Otte =

German Nazi administrator

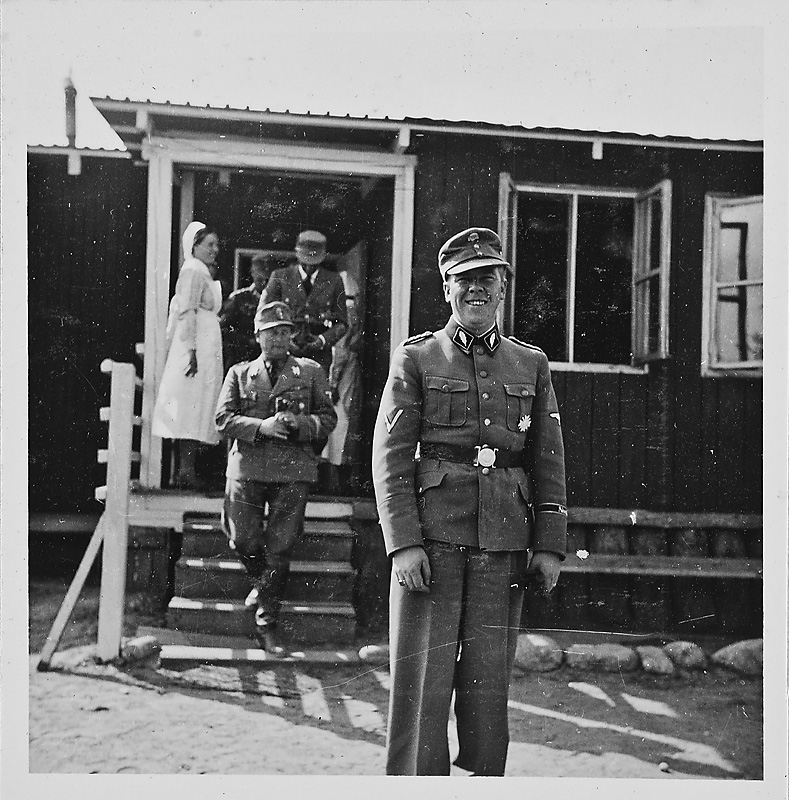
- Otte in 1942
- Born: 20 May 1908; Hamburg, Germany
- Occupation: Nazi administrator

Carlo Otte (born 20 May 1908; date of death unknown) was a German Nazi administrator.

During World War II he chaired the economy section of Reichskommissariat Norwegen, and was Josef Terboven's adviser on economical issues. By holding this position, he had significant influence on Norwegian economy during the German occupation of Norway.
