= Hans Metzger =

German diplomat

- Born: 1912
- Occupation: Diplomat

Hans Metzger (Johannes August Iwar) (born 24. 8.1912, death 2000) was a German diplomat, who spent a part of his childhood in Finland. He worked as a German media attache in Finland from 1939 to 1944.

During World War II, Metzger had a close relationship with the President of Finland Risto Ryti and the Minister of Education of Finland, Reverent Antti Kukkonen, who served in the two governments of the Prime Minister of Finland Jukka Rangell.

In the 1980s Metzger published his two-part memories about his activities in Finland during the Winter War and the Continuation War.

== Works ==
- "Kolmannen valtakunnan edustajana talvisodan Suomessa" ("As a Representative of the Third Reich in the Winter War Period Finland"). Otava, 1984.
- "Poliittiset aseveljet. Kolmannen valtakunnan edustajana jatkosodan Suomessa 1941–1944" ("Political Brothers-in-Arms. As a Representative of the Third Reich in the Winter War Period Finland, 1941-1944"). Otava, 1986.
