= Felix von Zobel =

German politician (born 1992)

Member of the Landtag of Bavaria
- Incumbent
- Assumed office 30 October 2023
- Constituency: Lower Franconia

Personal details
- Born: 3 September 1992 (age 34)
- Party: Free Voters (since 2013)

Felix Freiherr Zobel von Giebelstadt zu Darstadt (born 3 September 1992) is a German politician serving as a member of the Landtag of Bavaria since 2023. He has served as secretary of the Landtag since 2023.
