= Max Seela =

Recipient of the Knight's Cross

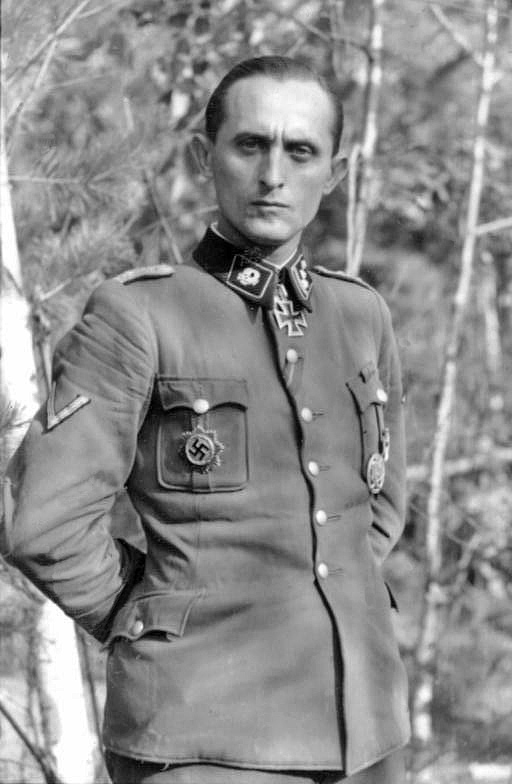
- Born: 15 July 1911; Schöneiche, German Empire
- Died: 31 July 1999 (aged 88); Ratingen, Germany
- SS-VT and Waffen-SS career
- Allegiance: Nazi Germany
- Service years: 1933–45
- Rank: lieutenant colonel (Obersturmbannführer)
- Units: 3rd SS Panzer Division Totenkopf; 9th SS Panzer Division Hohenstaufen
- Conflicts: World War II
- Awards: Knight's Cross of the Iron Cross; German Cross in Gold

Max Seela (15 July 1911 – 31 July 1999) was a lieutenant colonel (Obersturmbannführer) in the Waffen-SS during World War II. He was a recipient of the Knight's Cross of the Iron Cross.

== Career ==
Max Seela was born in 1911 at Schöneiche near Berlin. He enlisted in Reichswehr (German Army) in 1929 and was then transferred into the SS-VT in 1935. His SS service number was 257,323 and his NSDAP number was 147,126. In September 1935 he joined the SS Pioneer Battalion.

By October 1939 Seela had been given command of a company in the pioneer battalion of the SS Division Totenkopf. He was awarded the Iron Cross, 2nd class, in May 1940 and the Iron Cross, 1st class, in June 1940. He took part in the invasion of the Soviet Union (Operation Barbarossa) and was awarded the German Cross in Gold in December 1941.

Seela was awarded the Knight's Cross in May 1942, while he was a Hauptsturmführer (captain) and in command of 3rd Company, SS Pioneer Battalion Totenkopf. Despite severe losses and meager supplies, his unit occupied the Russian village of Korowitsch (east of Staraya Russa) in the Demyansk Pocket for one month. Seela and his men prevented the village from being recaptured, denying the Soviet Army access to the crucial bridge over the Lovat River.

In July 1942, Seela was given command of the 3rd SS Pioneer Battalion Totenkopf until April 1944 when he was appointed commander of the II SS Panzer Corps Pioneers. He was then given command of the 19th SS Panzer Grenadier Regiment, 9th SS Panzer Division Hohenstaufen.

On 8 May 1945, Seela surrendered to the American forces. He died in Ratingen, at the age of 88 on 31 July 1999.

== Awards and decorations ==
- Knight's Cross of the Iron Cross (3 May 1942)
- German Cross in Gold (26/12/1941)
- Iron Cross of 1939
  - 1st Class (22 June 1940)
  - 2nd Class (31 May 1940)
- General Assault Badge (1941)
- Wound Badge of 1939 in Black (1941)
- Anschluss Medal (1938)
- Sudetenland Medal (1938) with "Prague Castle" clasp (1939)
- Service Award of the NSDAP in Bronze and in Silver
- German Reich Sports Badge in Bronze (1 December 1938)
- SA Sports Badge in Silver (1 December 1936)
- Sword of honour of the Reichsführer-SS (1 December 1936)
- SS Honour Ring (1 December 1937)
- Julleuchter of the SS (16 December 1935)
- Honour Chevron for the Old Guard (February 1934)
