= 1910 in Germany =

- Decades: 1890s; 1900s; 1910s; 1920s; 1930s
- See also: Other events of 1910; History of Germany • Timeline • Years

Events in the year 1910 in Germany.

== Incumbents ==
=== National level ===
- Emperor – Wilhelm II
- Chancellor – Theobald von Bethmann Hollweg

=== State level ===
==== Kingdoms ====
- King of Bavaria – Otto
- King of Prussia – Wilhelm II
- King of Saxony – Frederick Augustus III
- King of Württemberg – William II

==== Grand Duchies ====
- Grand Duke of Baden – Frederick II
- Grand Duke of Hesse – Ernest Louis
- Grand Duke of Mecklenburg-Schwerin – Frederick Francis IV
- Grand Duke of Mecklenburg-Strelitz – Adolphus Frederick V
- Grand Duke of Oldenburg – Frederick Augustus II
- Grand Duke of Saxe-Weimar-Eisenach – William Ernest

==== Principalities ====
- Schaumburg-Lippe – George, Prince of Schaumburg-Lippe
- Schwarzburg-Rudolstadt – Günther Victor, Prince of Schwarzburg
- Schwarzburg-Sondershausen – Günther Victor, Prince of Schwarzburg
- Principality of Lippe – Leopold IV, Prince of Lippe
- Reuss Elder Line – Heinrich XXIV, Prince Reuss of Greiz (with Heinrich XIV, Prince Reuss Younger Line as regent)
- Reuss Younger Line – Heinrich XIV, Prince Reuss Younger Line
- Waldeck and Pyrmont – Friedrich, Prince of Waldeck and Pyrmont

==== Duchies ====
- Duke of Anhalt – Frederick II, Duke of Anhalt
- Duke of Brunswick – Duke John Albert of Mecklenburg (regent)
- Duke of Saxe-Altenburg – Ernst II, Duke of Saxe-Altenburg
- Duke of Saxe-Coburg and Gotha – Charles Edward, Duke of Saxe-Coburg and Gotha
- Duke of Saxe-Meiningen – Georg II, Duke of Saxe-Meiningen

==== Colonial Governors ====
- Cameroon (Kamerun) – Theodor Seitz (4th and final term) to 27 August, then Theodor Steinhausen (acting governor) to September, then Wilhelm Peter Hansen (acting governor) to 25 October, then Otto Gleim (3rd and final term)
- Kiaochow (Kiautschou) – Oskar von Truppel
- German East Africa (Deutsch-Ostafrika) – Georg Albrecht Freiherr von Rechenberg
- German New Guinea (Deutsch-Neuguinea) – Albert Hahl (2nd term)
- German Samoa (Deutsch-Samoa) – Wilhelm Solf
- German South-West Africa (Deutsch-Südwestafrika) – Bruno von Schuckmann to 20 June, then Theodor Seitz from 28 August
- Togoland – Johann Nepomuk Graf Zech auf Neuhofen to 7 November, then vacant

== Events ==
- 22 June – The DELAG Zeppelin dirigible, Deutschland, makes the first commercial passenger flight from Friedrichshafen to Düsseldorf in Germany. The flight takes nine hours.
- 16 August – Berliner FV, German association football club founded.
- Full date unknown
  - Gymnasium Lerchenfeld is founded in Hamburg.

== Births ==
- 12 January – Luise Rainer, actress (died 2014)
- 20 February – Rudolf Beckmann, SS officer (died 1943)
- 27 February – Carl Tchilinghiryan, German businessman, founder of Tchibo (died 1987)
- 11 March – Robert Havemann, German chemist (died 1982)
- 20 April – Brigitte Mira, German actress (died 2005)
- 22 April – Friedrich Franz, Hereditary Grand Duke of Mecklenburg-Schwerin (died 2001)
- 30 May – Inge Meysel, German actress (died 2004)
- 22 June – Herbert Quandt, German industrialist (died 1982)
- 1 August – Gerda Taro, Polish-German war photographer (died 1937)
- 11 September – Gerhard Schröder, politician (died 1989)
- 16 September – Karl Kling, German race car driver (died 2003)
- 18 September – Josef Tal, German-born Israeli composer (died 2008)
- 8 October – Helmut Kallmeyer, chemist and Action T4 perpetrator (died 2006)
- 6 November – Erik Ode, German actor (died 1983)
- Date unknown – Yaakov Ben-Tor, German-born Israeli geologist (died 2002)

== Deaths ==
- 10 March – Carl Reinecke, German composer, conductor and pianist (born 1824)
- 7 May – Bernhard Cossmann, German cellist (born 1822)
- 27 May – Robert Koch, German physician, Nobel Prize laureate (born 1843)
- 10 July – Johann Gottfried Galle, German astronomer (born 1812)
- 26 August – Friedrich Daniel von Recklinghausen, pathologist (born 1833)
- 15 November – Wilhelm Raabe, German writer (born 1831)
- 19 November – Wilhelm Rudolph Fittig, German chemist (born 1835)
