= Gabriele Wülker =

German social scientist and civil servant

Gabriele Wülker (16 July 1911 – 10 October 2001) was a German social scientist and civil servant.

She was the State Secretary (senior civil servant) of the Federal Ministry of Family Affairs, Senior Citizens, Women and Youth from 1957 to 1959. She was the first of her gender in this position of her country.

== Works ==
- 1941 : Bauerntum am Rande der Großstadt. II. Bevölkerungs- und Wirtschaftswachstum im 19. und 20. Jahrhundert (Hainholz, Vahrenwald und List bei Hannover), Leipzig, S. Hirzel.
- 1952 : with Werner Möhring, Europa und die deutschen Flüchtlinge.
- 1953 : Probleme der soziologischen Einordnung fremder ethnischer Gruppen in die deutsche Bundesrepublik, Cologne.
- 1962 : In Asien und Afrika, Kreuz-Verlag.
- 1966 : Togo - Tradition und Entwicklung, Klett Verlag.
