= Marga Faulstich =

German chemist (1915–1998)

- Born: 16 June 1915; Weimar, Thuringia, German Empire
- Died: 1 February 1998 (aged 82); Mainz, Germany
- Citizenship: German
- Scientific career
- Fields: Chemistry, glassmaking, optics
- Workplaces: Schott AG

Marga Faulstich (16 June 1915 – 1 February 1998) was a German glass chemist. She worked for Schott AG for 44 years. During this time, she worked on more than 300 types of optical glasses. Forty patents were registered in her name. She was the first woman executive at Schott AG.

== Life and work ==
Marga Faulstich was born in Weimar in 1915. She had two siblings. In 1922, the family moved to Jena, where Faulstich attended secondary school. After graduating from high school in 1935, she began training as a graduate assistant at Schott AG, one of the leading manufacturers of optical and technical specialty glasses in Europe. In her early years there, she worked on the development of thin films. The findings from the basic research performed then are still used in the manufacture of sunglasses, anti-reflective lenses, and glass facades.

A talented young woman, Faulstich quickly advanced in her career – from graduate assistant to technician, then to scientific assistant, and finally to scientist. Her fiancé died in the Second World War, and from then on, she focused only on her career. In 1942 she studied chemistry while continuing to work at Schott. She could not finish her studies because the situation changed after the Second World War. The most advanced glassmaking facility in the world at that time was in Jena, which lay within the Soviet occupation zone.

Faulstich was among 41 specialists and managers of Schott AG brought to the western sector where a new research laboratory was built in Landshut in 1949 for the people from Schott AG to continue their work. After the plant in Jena was expropriated in 1948 and the division of Germany was firmly established in 1949, it was decided that a new plant would be built in Mainz for the "41 glassmakers" of Schott AG.

The new plant on the outskirts of Mainz-Neustadt ('new town') was opened in 1952. Here Marga Faulstich continued working on research and development of new optical glasses, with a particular focus on lenses for microscopes and binoculars. In addition to her research, Faulstich managed a crucible melt.

Marga Faulstich received international recognition for the invention of the lightweight lens SF 64, for which she was honored in 1973. In 1979 she retired after working at Schott AG for 44 years. She spent the following years travelling to distant lands, but still gave lectures and presentations at glass conferences. She died on 1 February 1998 in Mainz, at age 82.

Google honored her in a doodle on its homepage on 16 June 2018.
