= Josef Stürmann =

German philosopher

Josef Stürmann (1906–1959) was a Munich philosopher who had studied with the phenomenologist Alexander Pfänder.

Stürmann was also a member of the Christian Social Union of Bavaria.
