= 1996 in Germany =

- Decades: 1970s; 1980s; 1990s; 2000s; 2010s
- See also: Other events of 1996; History of Germany • Timeline • Years

Events in the year 1996 in Germany.

== Incumbents ==
- President – Roman Herzog
- Chancellor – Helmut Kohl

== Events ==
- Deutsche Telekom is privatized.
- 15–26 February – 46th Berlin International Film Festival
- 1 March – Germany in the Eurovision Song Contest 1996
- 11 April – Düsseldorf Airport fire
- 28 June – Osnabrück mortar attack
- 1 October – Jakub Fiszman is abducted.

=== Elections ===
- Rhineland-Palatinate state election, 1996

== Births ==
- 6 March – Timo Werner, footballer
- 2 May – Lisa Mayer, athlete
- 13 August – Antonia Lottner, tennis player
- 11 November – Gianluca Gaudino, footballer
- 21 November – Gina Lückenkemper, athlete

== Deaths ==
- 1 January – Arthur Rudolph, German rocket engineer (born 1906)
- 6 January – Kurt Schmücker, German politician (born 1919)
- 9 February – Adolf Galland, German general (born 1912)
- 23 February – Helmut Schön, German football player and manager (born 1915)
- 26 February – Georg Henneberg, German physician (born 1908)
- 4 March – Gerhard Schaffran, German bishop of Roman Catholic Church (born 1912)
- 15 March – Wolfgang Koeppen, German writer (born 1906)
- 28 March – Hans Blumenberg, philosopher and intellectual historian (born 1920)
- 3 May – Hermann Kesten, German author (born 1900)
- 11 June – Brigitte Helm, German actress (born 1906)
- 8 July – Albrecht, Duke of Bavaria, German nobleman (born 1905)
- 14 August – Camilla Horn, German actress (born 1903)
- 15 August – Albert Osswald, German politician (born 1919)
- 20 August – Rio Reiser, singer (born 1950)
- 19 September – Helmut Heißenbüttel, German writer (born 1921)
- 21 September
  - Franz Pfnür, German alpine skier (born 1908)
  - Claus Holm, German actor (born 1918)
- 13 October – Henri Nannen, German journalist (born 1913)
- 8 November – Johannes Frömming, German harness racing driver (born 1910)
- 29 December – Wolfgang Pietzsch, German chess grand master (born 1930)

== See also ==
- 1996 in German television
