= 1997 in Germany =

- Decades: 1970s; 1980s; 1990s; 2000s; 2010s
- See also: Other events of 1997; History of Germany • Timeline • Years

Events in the year 1997 in Germany.

== Incumbents ==
- President – Roman Herzog
- Chancellor – Helmut Kohl

== Events ==
=== Michael Jackson ===
Michael Jackson performed on July 4 and 6, 1997, as a part of the HIStory World Tour. He also performed in 1992 as a part of the Dangerous World Tour

== Births ==
- 7 January – Sophie Scheder, artistic gymnast
- 2 February – Fabian Griewel, politician
- 14 March – Aaron Valent, politician
- 23 May – Alina Reh, long-distance runner
- 7 April – Richard Heinze, celebrity star and beauty pageant model
- 22 October – Jan Köstering, politician
- 29 October – Jasper Balke, politician

== Deaths ==
- February 1 – Heiner Carow, film director and screenwriter (born 1929)
- March 1 – Hans Robert Jauss, academic (born 1921)
- May 22 – Klaus von Bismarck, journalist (born 1912)
- May 26 – Manfred von Ardenne, research and applied physicist and inventor (born 1907).
- 26 June – Adolf Weidmann, athlete and sports official (born 1901)
- 8 September – Jorrit Bosch, politician
- 27 September – Walter Trampler, German violist (b. 1915)
- 29 October 29 – Alexander zu Dohna-Schlobitten, German Junker, soldier, and author (b. 1899)
