= Theodor Seitz =

German colonial governor (1863-1949)

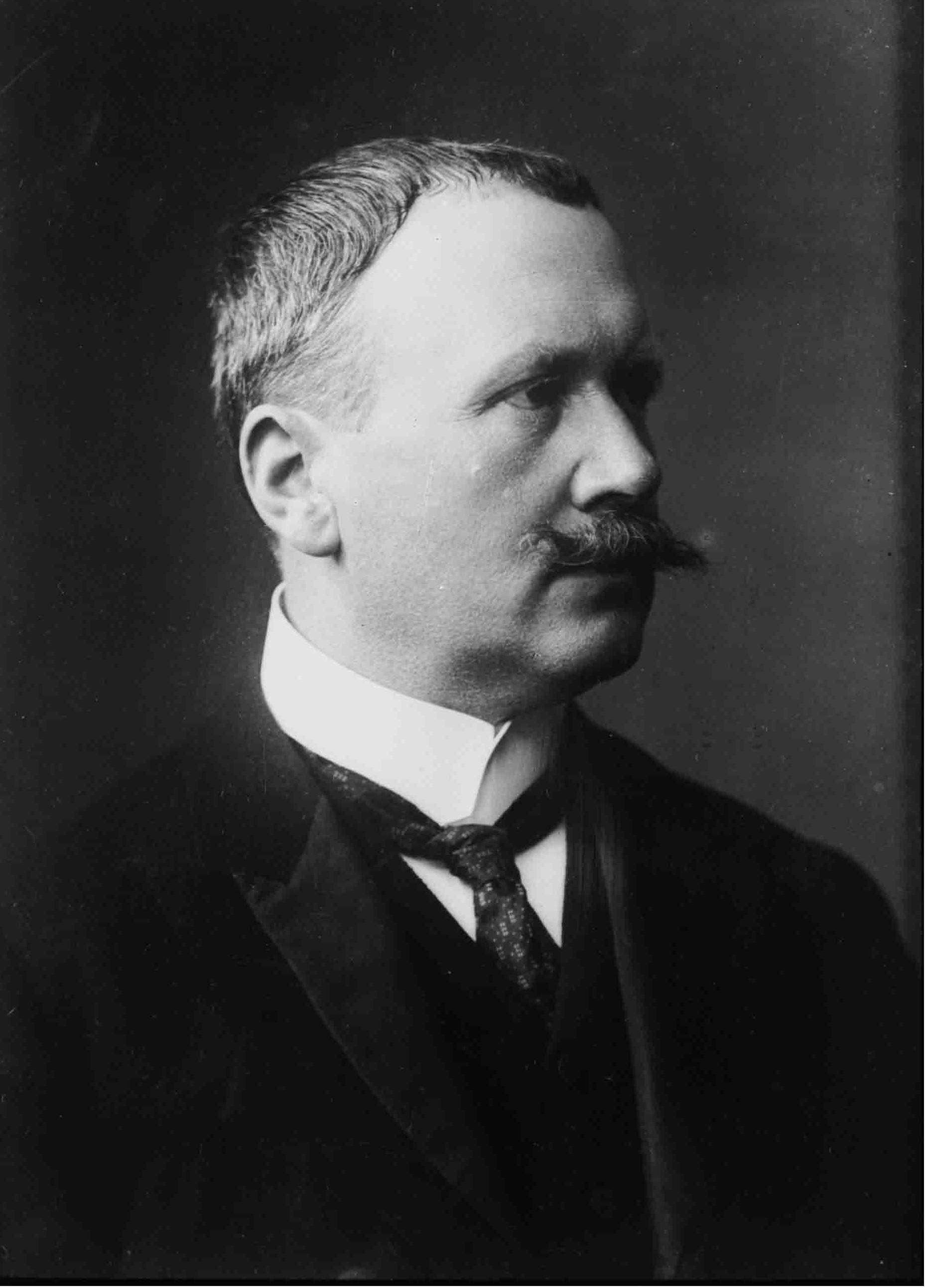
Theodor Seitz

Theodor Seitz (Mannheim, 12 September 1863 – Baden-Baden, 28 March 1949) was a German colonial governor.

He studied law at the University of Heidelberg. He entered in the service of the Foreign Office and became on 9 May 1907 Imperial Governor of Kamerun.

On 28 August 1910, he became Governor of German South West Africa (today Namibia) at Windhoek.

At the outbreak of World War I, the colony was invaded by a British-South African force.

The outnumbered German troops under command of Victor Franke had to capitulate on 9 July 1915.

He remained in captivity until 1919, when all Germans were sent to Germany and the colony was annexed by the British.

In 1920 he became president of the German Colonial Society and in 1930 honorary president.
