= 2003 in Germany =

- Decades: 1980s; 1990s; 2000s; 2010s; 2020s
- See also: Other events of 2003; History of Germany • Timeline • Years

Events in the year 2003 in Germany.

== Incumbents ==
- President – Johannes Rau
- Chancellor – Gerhard Schröder

== Events ==
- 6–16 February: 53rd Berlin International Film Festival
- 7 March: Germany in the Eurovision Song Contest 2003
- 27 March: Death of Jeremiah Duggan
- 2 July: Coburg shooting
- 14 July: Accident on the Bundesautobahn 5

=== Full date unknown ===
- Learning Resource Server Medicine is developed in German and English for medicine and dentistry learning and teaching.

== Elections ==
- Bavarian state election, 2003
- Bremen state election, 2003
- Hessian state election, 2003
- Lower Saxony state election, 2003

== Sport ==
- 2003 Men's European Volleyball Championship
- 2002–03 Bundesliga
- 2002–03 2. Bundesliga
- 2002–03 Deutsche Eishockey Liga season
- 2003 European Grand Prix
- 2003 German Grand Prix
- 2003 German motorcycle Grand Prix
- 2003 BMW Open

== Births ==
- 6 February - Justus Fischer, handball player
- 11 September - Marko Grgic, handball player
- 15 September - Pascal Brendel, German gymnast
- 15 September - Linnea Weidemann, field hockey player
- 24 September - Lina Sontag, basketball player

== Deaths ==
- 5 February - Manfred von Brauchitsch, German racing driver (born 1905)
- 3 March - Horst Buchholz, German actor (born 1933)
- 18 March - Karl Kling, German racing driver (born 1910)
- 28 March - Ludwig Elsbett, German engineer (born 1913)
- 18 April - Rudolf Brunnenmeier, German football player (born 1941)
- 30 May - Günter Pfitzmann, German actor (born 1924)
- 5 June - Jürgen Möllemann, German politician (born 1945)
- 25 July - Ludwig Bölkow, German aeronautical pioneer (born 1912)
- 26 July - Jürgen Brandt, German general (born 1922)
- 14 August - Helmut Rahn, German football player (born 1929)
- 28 August - Peter Hacks, German playwright and author (born 1928)
- 28 August - Philipp-Ernst, Prince of Schaumburg-Lippe, German nobleman (born 1928)
- 8 September - Leni Riefenstahl, German film director, producer, screenwriter, editor, photographer, actress and dancer (born 1902)
- 14 September - Henry Schmill, German mining engineer (born 1925)
- 21 October - Werner Krüger, German engineer (born 1910)
- 26 October - Heinz Piontek, German writer (born 1925)
- 23 November - Lothar Emmerich, German football player (born 1941)
- 27 November - Will Quadflieg, German actor (born 1914)

== See also ==
- 2003 in German television
