= Autobahn =

National expressway in Germany

Bundesautobahn
- Selected Autobahn signs with route markers for Bundesautobahnen 2, 14, 63, and 480

- A map of the German Bundesautobahn network

System information
- Maintained by administrative division jurisdictions
- Length: 13,210 km (2024) (8,210 mi)
- Formed: 1932; 94 years ago

Highway names
- Autobahns: Bundesautobahn X (BAB X or A X)
- Website: www.autobahn.de

System links

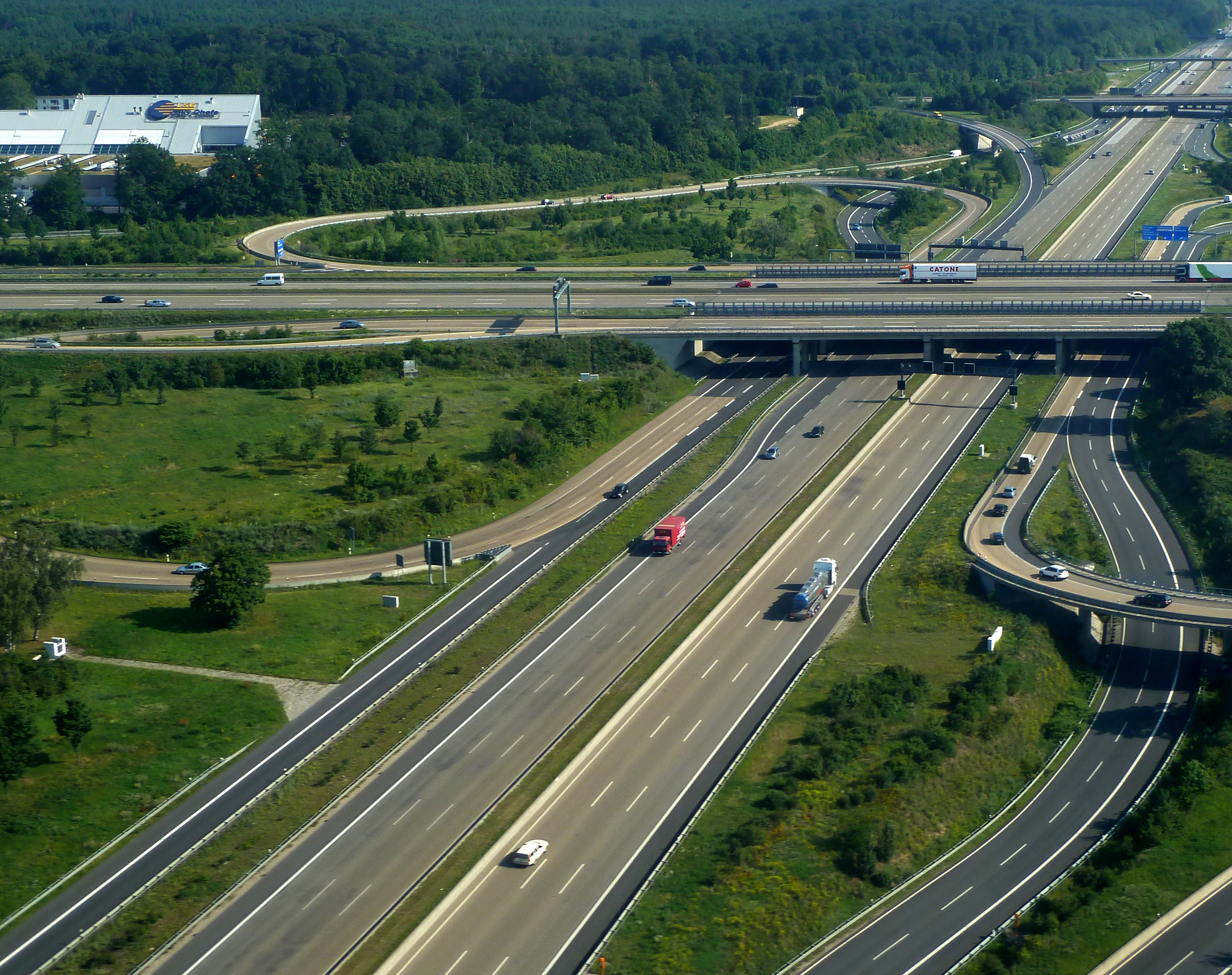
A 3 and A 5 at Frankfurter Kreuz near Frankfurt am Main

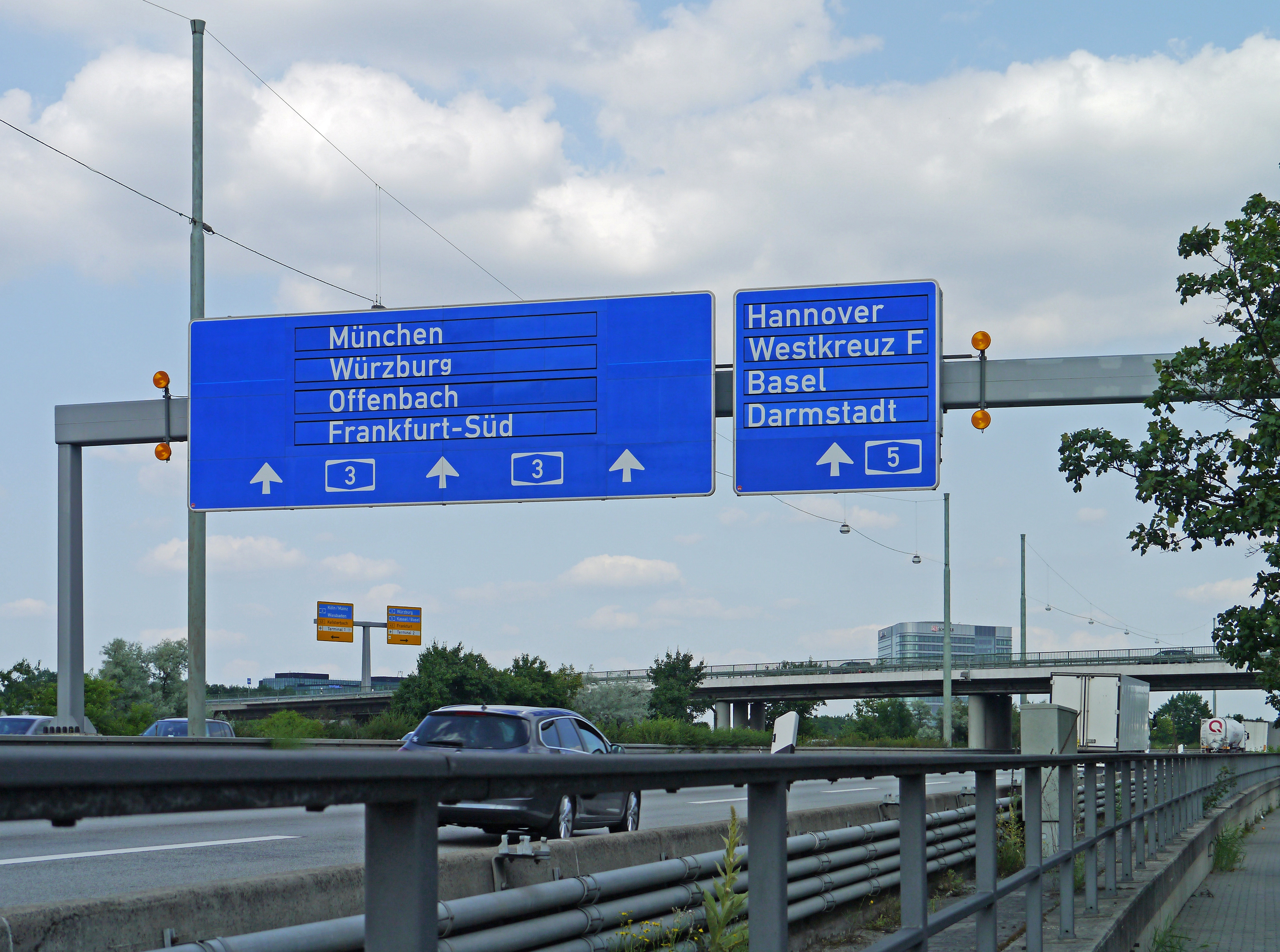
Overhead signage on A 3

The Autobahn (IPA: [ˈaʊtoˌbaːn]; German pl. Autobahnen, pronounced [ˈaʊtoˌbaːnən]) is the federal controlled-access highway system in Germany. The official term is Bundesautobahn (abbreviated BAB), which translates as 'federal motorway'. The literal meaning of the word Bundesautobahn is 'Federal Auto(mobile) Track'.

Much of the system has no speed limit for some classes of vehicles. However, limits are posted and enforced in areas that are urbanised, substandard, prone to collisions, or under construction. On speed-unrestricted stretches, an advisory speed limit (Richtgeschwindigkeit) of 130 kilometres per hour (81 mph) applies. While driving faster is not illegal in the absence of a speed limit, it can cause an increased liability in the case of a collision (which mandatory auto insurance has to cover); courts have ruled that an "ideal driver" who is exempt from absolute liability for "inevitable" tort under the law would not exceed the advisory speed limit.

A 2017 report by the Federal Road Research Institute reported that in 2015, 70.4% of the Autobahn network had only the advisory speed limit, 6.2% had temporary speed limits due to weather or traffic conditions, and 23.4% had permanent speed limits. In 2006, measurements from the German state of Brandenburg showed average speeds of 142 km/h (88 mph) on a 6-lane section of Autobahn in free-flowing conditions.

== Names ==
Only federally built controlled-access highways with certain construction standards including at least two lanes per direction are called Bundesautobahn. They have their own white-on-blue signs and numbering system. In the 1930s, when construction began on the system, the official name was Reichsautobahn. Various other controlled-access highways exist on the federal (Bundesstraße), state (Landesstraße), district, and municipal level but are not part of the Autobahn network and are officially referred to as Kraftfahrstraße (with rare exceptions, like A 995 Munich-Giesing–Brunntal until 2018). These highways are considered autobahnähnlich (autobahn-like) and are sometimes colloquially called Gelbe Autobahn (yellow autobahn) because most of them are Bundesstraßen (federal highways) with yellow signs. Some controlled-access highways are classified as "Bundesautobahn" in spite of not meeting the autobahn construction standard (for example, the A 62 near Pirmasens).

Similar to some other German words, the term autobahn when used in English is usually understood to refer specifically to the national highway system of Germany, whereas in German the word autobahn is applied to any controlled highway in any country. For this reason in German, the more specific term Bundesautobahn is strongly preferred when the intent is to make specific reference to Germany's Autobahn network.

== Construction ==
Similar to high-speed motorways in other countries, autobahns have multiple lanes of traffic in each direction, separated by a central barrier with grade-separated junctions and access restricted to motor vehicles with a top speed greater than 60 km/h (37 mph). Nearly all exits are to the right; rare left-hand exits result from incomplete interchanges where the "straight-on" leads into the exit. The earliest motorways were flanked by shoulders about 60 centimetres (24 in) in width, constructed of varying materials; right-hand shoulders on many autobahns were later retrofitted to 120 centimetres (47 in) in width when it was realized cars needed the additional space to pull off the autobahn safely. In the postwar years, a thicker asphaltic concrete cross-section with fully paved hard shoulders came into general use. The top design speed was approximately 160 km/h (99 mph) in flat country but lower design speeds were used in hilly or mountainous terrain. A flat-country autobahn that was constructed to meet standards during the Nazi period could support speeds of up to 150 km/h (93 mph) on curves.

=== Numbering system ===
Numbering pattern of autobahns in Germany: single digit autobahns in black and colored first digit regions for two or three digit autobahns

The current autobahn numbering system in use in Germany was introduced in 1974. All autobahns are named by using the capital letter A, which simply stands for "Autobahn" followed by a blank and a number (for example A 8). The main autobahns going all across Germany have a single-digit number. Shorter autobahns that are of regional importance (e.g. connecting two major cities or regions within Germany) have a double-digit number (e.g. A 24, connecting Berlin and Hamburg). The system is as follows:

- A 10 to A 19 are in eastern Germany (Berlin, Saxony-Anhalt, parts of Saxony and Brandenburg)
- A 20 to A 29 are in northern and northeastern Germany
- A 30 to A 39 are in Lower Saxony (northwestern Germany) and Thuringia
- A 40 to A 49 are in the Rhine-Ruhr to Frankfurt Rhine-Main
- A 52 to A 59 are in the Lower Rhine region to Cologne
- A 60 to A 67 are in Rhineland-Palatinate, Saarland, Hesse and northern Baden-Württemberg
- A 70 to A 73 are in Thuringia, northern Bavaria and parts of Saxony
- A 81 is in Baden-Württemberg
- A 90 to A 99 are in (southern) Bavaria
- A 98 is in Baden-Württemberg

There are also some very short autobahns built just for local traffic (e.g. ring roads or the A 555 from Cologne to Bonn) that usually have three digits for numbering. The first digit used is similar to the system above, depending on the region.

East–west routes are even-numbered, north–south routes are odd-numbered. The north–south autobahns are generally numbered from west to east; that is to say, the more easterly roads are given higher numbers. Similarly, the east–west routes are numbered from north (lower numbers) to south (higher numbers).

== History ==
=== Weimar Republic: 1918-1933 ===
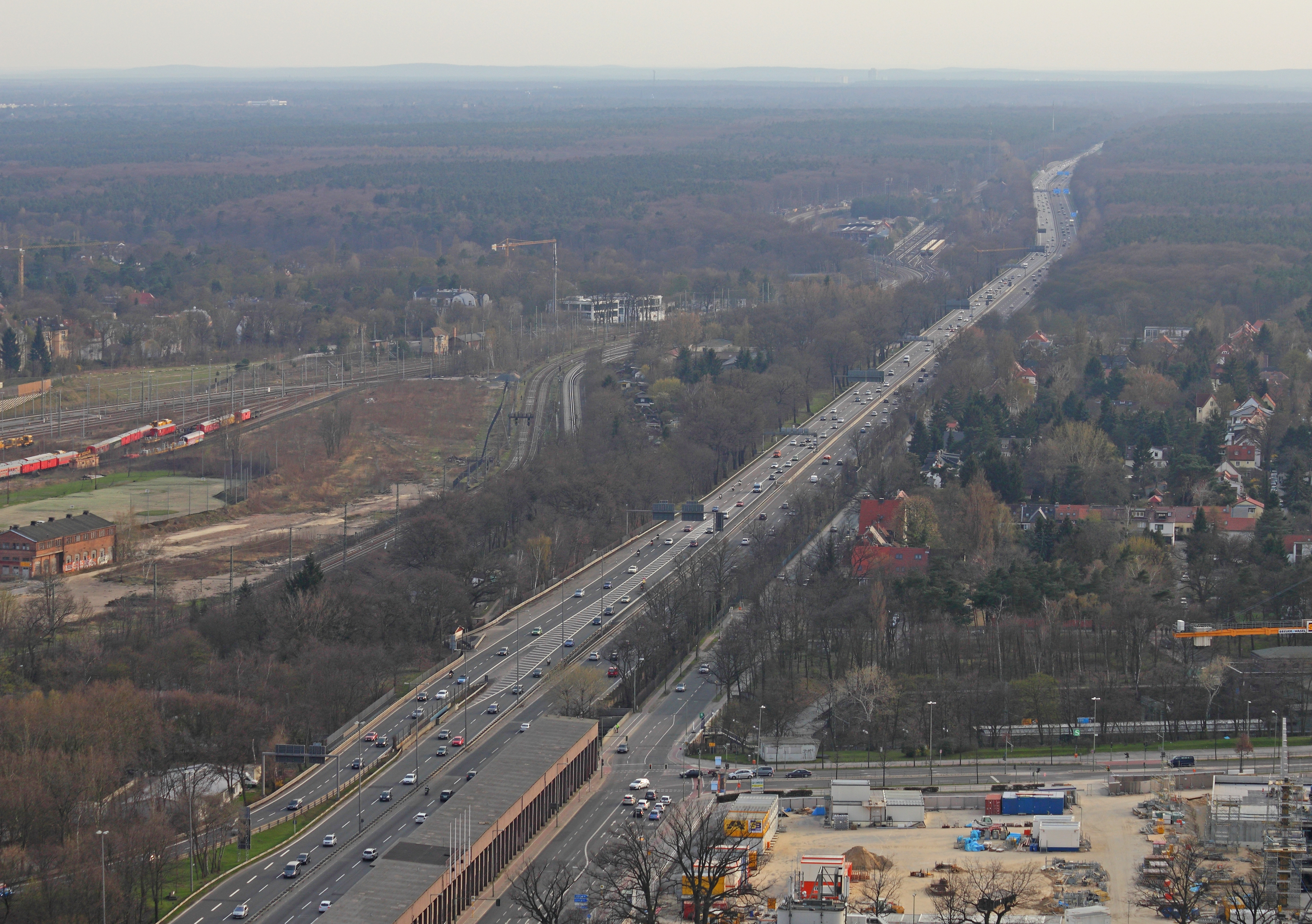
Part of the AVUS road in Berlin, the first automobile-only road and forefather of the Autobahn.

The idea for the construction of the autobahn was first conceived in the mid-1920s during the days of the Weimar Republic, but the construction was slow, and most projected sections did not progress much beyond the planning stage due to economic problems and a lack of political support. One project was the private initiative HaFraBa which planned a "car-only road" crossing Germany from Hamburg in the north via central Frankfurt am Main to Basel in Switzerland. Parts of the HaFraBa were completed in the late 1930s and early 1940s, but construction eventually was halted by World War II. The first public road of this kind was completed in 1932 between Cologne and Bonn and opened by Konrad Adenauer (Lord Mayor of Cologne and future Chancellor of West Germany) on 6 August 1932. Today, that road is the Bundesautobahn 555. This road was not yet called Autobahn and lacked a centre median like modern motorways, but instead was termed a Kraftfahrstraße ("motor vehicle road") with two lanes each direction without intersections, pedestrians, bicycles, or animal-powered transportation.

=== Third Reich: 1933-1945 ===
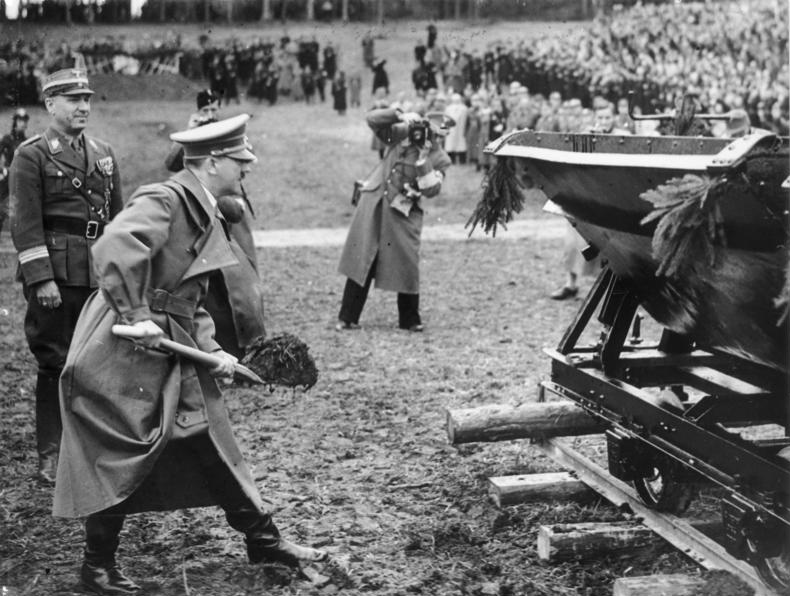
Hitler ceremonially starts the excavation works for the first Austrian autobahn (1938).

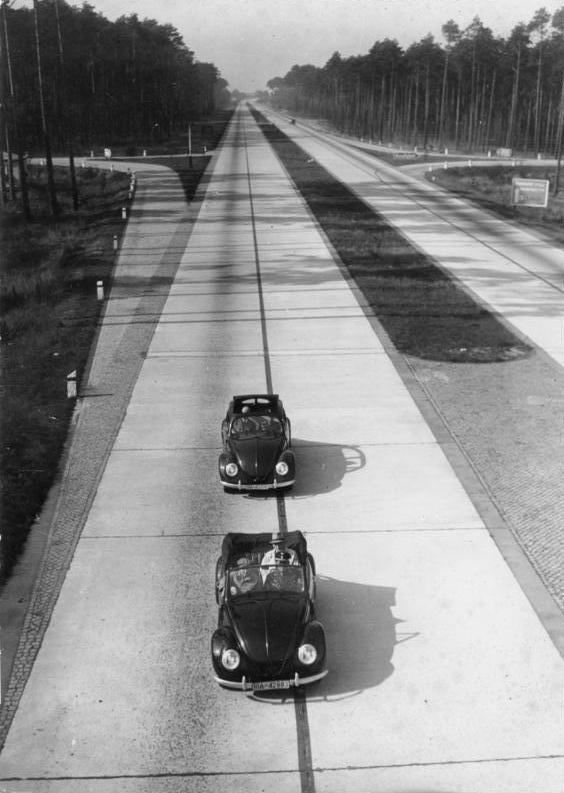
"Reichsautobahn" in 1943

Just days after the 1933 Nazi takeover, Adolf Hitler enthusiastically embraced an ambitious autobahn construction project, appointing Fritz Todt, the Inspector General of German Road Construction, to lead it. By 1936, 130,000 workers were directly employed in construction, as well as an additional 270,000 in the supply chain for construction equipment, steel, concrete, signage, maintenance equipment, etc. In rural areas, new camps to house the workers were built near construction sites. The job creation program aspect was not especially important because full employment was almost reached by 1936. However, according to one source autobahn workers were often conscripted through the compulsory Reich Labor Service (and thereby removed from the unemployment registry).

The autobahns were not primarily intended as major infrastructure improvement of special value to the military as sometimes stated. Their military value was limited as all large-scale military transportation in Germany was done by train to save fuel. The propaganda ministry turned the construction of the autobahns into a major media event that attracted international attention.

The autobahns formed the first limited-access, high-speed road network in the world, with the first section from Frankfurt am Main to Darmstadt opening in 1935. This straight section was used for high-speed record attempts by the Grand Prix racing teams of Mercedes-Benz and Auto Union until a fatal crash involving popular German race driver Bernd Rosemeyer in early 1938. The world record of 432 kilometres per hour (268 mph) set by Rudolf Caracciola on this stretch just prior to the crash remains one of the highest speeds ever achieved on a public motorway. In the 1930s, a ten-kilometre stretch of what is today Bundesautobahn 9 just south of Dessau—called the Dessauer Rennstrecke—had bridges with no piers and was designed for cars like the Mercedes-Benz T80 to attempt to make land speed records. The T80 was to make a record attempt in January 1940, but plans were abandoned after the outbreak of World War II in Europe in September 1939.

==== World War II: 1939-1945 ====
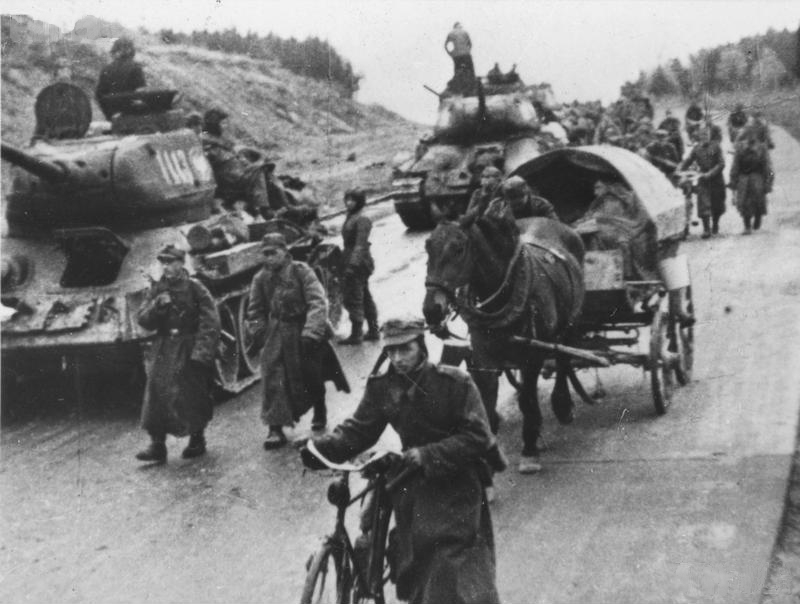
Polish Army tanks riding to Berlin using the German Autobahn at the end of World War II in 1945.

During World War II, many of Germany's workers were required for various war production tasks. Therefore, construction work on the autobahn system increasingly relied on forced workers and concentration camp inmates, and working conditions were very poor. As of 1942, when the war turned against Nazi Germany, only 3,800 km (2,400 mi) out of a planned 20,000 km (12,000 mi) of autobahn had been completed.

An American convoy bringing supplies on the Autobahn, 27 March 1945

Meanwhile, the median strips of some autobahns were paved over to allow their conversion into auxiliary airstrips. Aircraft were either stashed in numerous tunnels or camouflaged in nearby woods. However, for the most part during the war, the autobahns were not militarily significant. Motor vehicles, such as trucks, could not carry goods or troops as quickly or in as much bulk and in the same numbers as trains could, and the autobahns could not be used by tanks as their weight and caterpillar tracks damaged the road surface. The general shortage of petrol in Germany during much of the war, as well as the low number of trucks and motor vehicles needed for direct support of military operations, further decreased the autobahn's significance. As a result, most military and economic freight was carried by rail. After the war, numerous sections of the autobahns were in bad shape, severely damaged by heavy Allied bombing and military demolition. Furthermore, thousands of kilometres of autobahns remained unfinished, their construction brought to a halt by 1943 due to the increasing demands of the war effort.

=== West Germany: 1949–1990 ===
In West Germany (FRG), most existing autobahns were repaired soon after the war. During the 1950s, the West German government restarted the construction program. It invested in new sections and in improvements to older ones. Finishing the incomplete sections took longer, with some stretches opened to traffic by the 1980s. Some sections cut by the Iron Curtain in 1945 were only completed after German reunification in 1990. Others were never completed, as more advantageous routes were found. An example is Strecke 46 between Bad Brückenau and Gemünden am Main on the Fulda-Würzburg route, which was replaced by A7.

=== East Germany: 1949–1990 ===
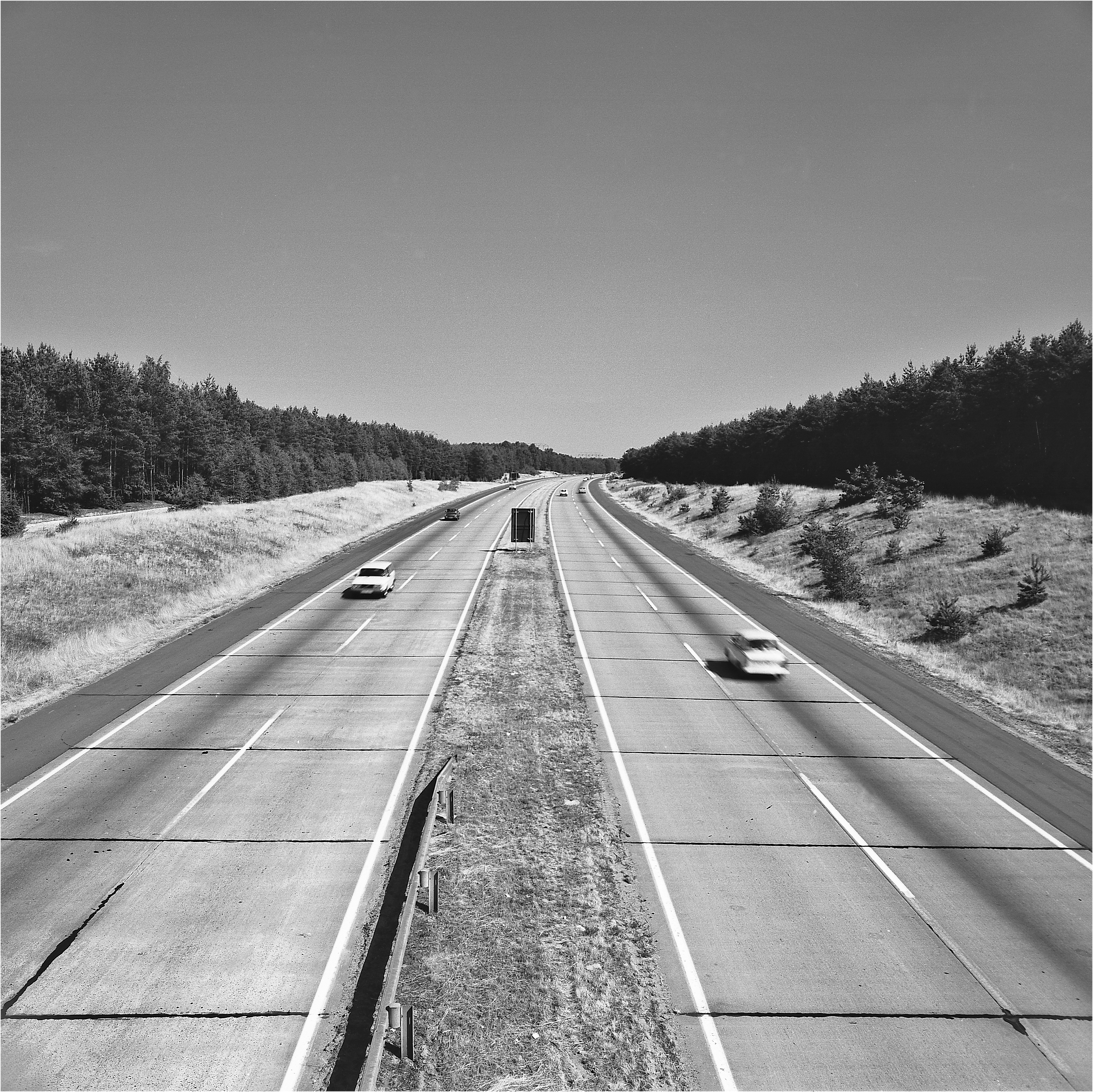
East German Autobahn

In 1956, the speed limit was set to 100 kilometres per hour (62 mph) in the new version of the Rules of the Road (Straßenverkehrsordnung), which adopted a lot of rules that corresponded with the international standards of the time. The reasons for this speed limit are unknown. Oftentimes it is argued that the roads were in a poor state, however, there is no proof that the road conditions were a relevant factor in introducing the speed limit, especially since the roads were not much used in the first 20 years after the Second World War and the majority of the road network was based on the Reichsautobahn of Nazi-Germany just like in West Germany, and thus were in a good state. Speed limit violations on the autobahns of the GDR were rare because most cars didn't have the engine power to go much faster than the set limit. For example, the most common car of the GDR, the Trabant, could reach a maximum of only 110 kilometres per hour (68 mph).

=== Reunification: 1990–present day ===
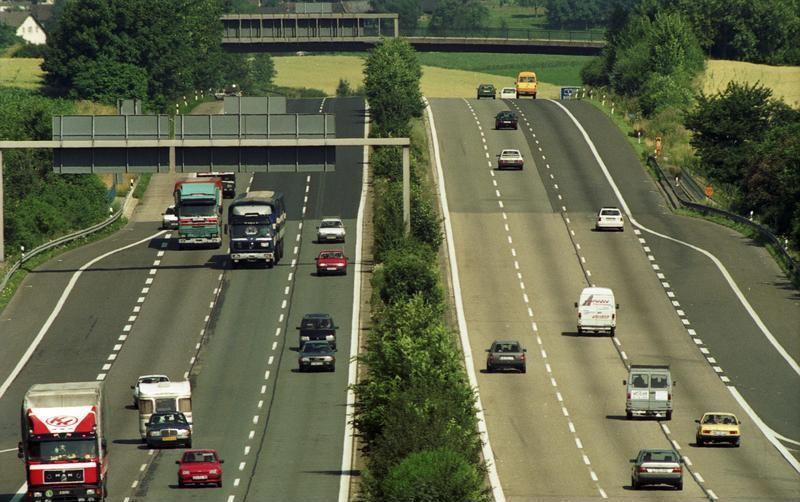
A 3 in 1991

The last 4 kilometres (2.5 mi) of the remaining original Reichsautobahn, a section of A 11 northeast of Berlin near Gartz built in 1936—the westernmost remainder of the never-finished Berlinka— was scheduled for replacement around 2015. Roadway condition is described as "deplorable"; the 25 metres (82 ft)-long concrete slabs, too long for proper expansion, are cracking under the weight of the traffic as well as the weather.

=== German-built Reichsautobahnen in other countries ===
The first autobahn in Austria was the West Autobahn from Wals near Salzburg to Vienna. Building started by command of Adolf Hitler shortly after the Anschluss in 1938. It extended the Reichsautobahn 26 from Munich (the present-day A 8), however only 16.8 km (10.4 mi) including the branch-off of the planned Tauern Autobahn was opened to the public on 13 September 1941. Construction works discontinued the next year and were not resumed until 1955.

There are sections of the former German Reichsautobahn system in the former eastern territories of Germany, i.e. East Prussia, Farther Pomerania, and Silesia; these territories became parts of Poland and the Soviet Union with the implementation of the Oder–Neisse line after World War II. Parts of the planned autobahn from Berlin to Königsberg (the Berlinka) were completed as far as Stettin (Szczecin) on 27 September 1936. After the war, they were incorporated as the A6 autostrada of the Polish motorway network. A single-carriageway section of the Berlinka east of the former "Polish Corridor" and the Free City of Danzig opened in 1938; today it forms the Polish S22 expressway from Elbląg (Elbing) to the border with the Russian Kaliningrad Oblast, where it is continued by the R516 regional road. Also on 27 September 1936, a section from Breslau (Wrocław) to Liegnitz (Legnica) in Silesia was inaugurated, which today is part of the Polish A4 autostrada, followed by the (single vehicle) Reichsautobahn 9 from Bunzlau (Bolesławiec) to Sagan (Żagań) the next year, today part of the Polish A18 autostrada.

After the German occupation of Czechoslovakia, plans for a motorway connecting Breslau with Vienna via Brno (Brünn) in the "Protectorate of Bohemia and Moravia" were carried out from 1939 until construction works discontinued in 1942. A section of the former Strecke 88 near Brno is today part of the D52 motorway of the Czech Republic. Also, there is the isolated and abandoned twin-carriageway Borovsko Bridge southeast of Prague, on which construction started in July 1939 and halted after the assassination of Reinhard Heydrich by former Czechoslovak army soldiers at the end of May 1942.

== Network size ==
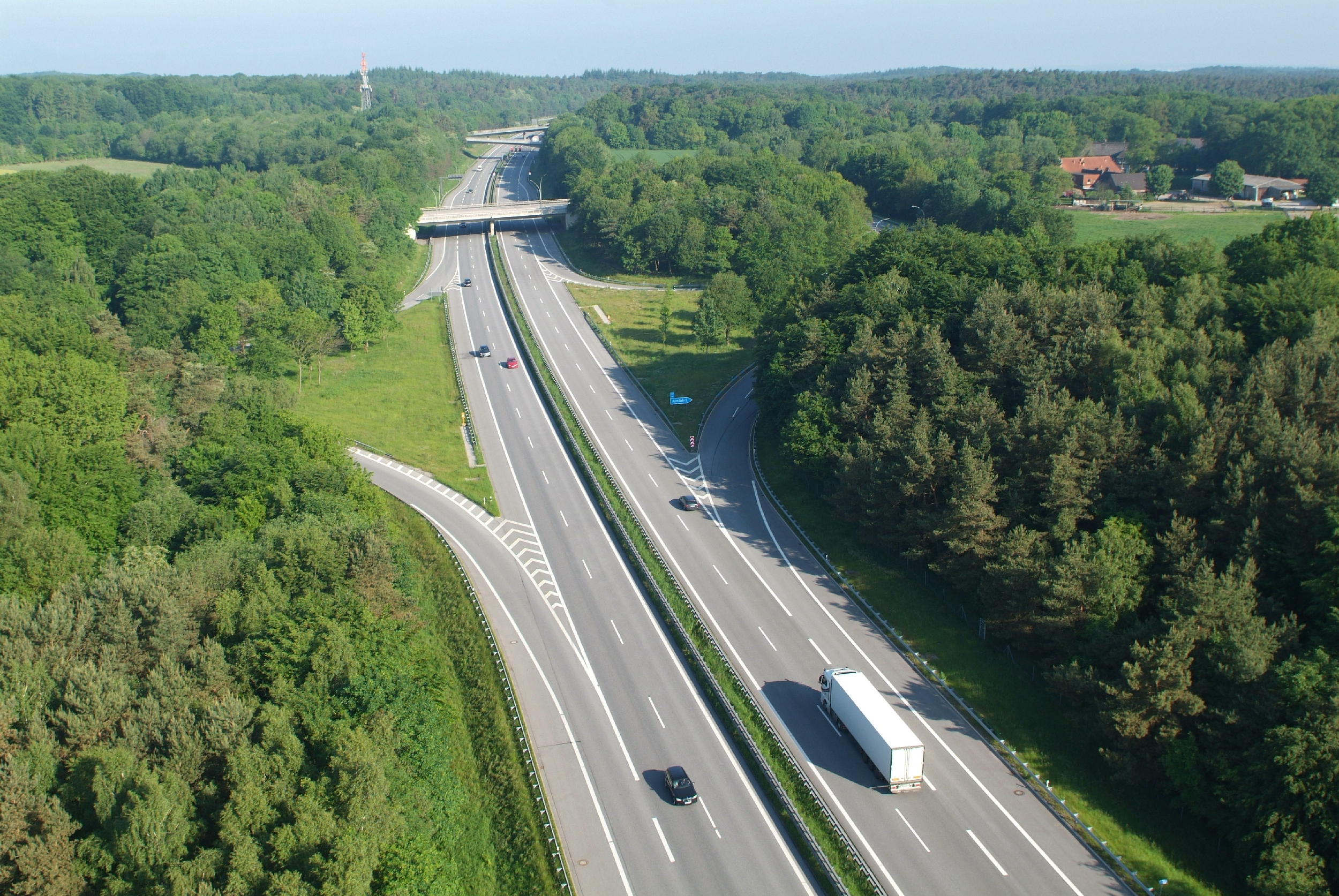
BAB 7, the longest national motorway in the European Union, approaching Hamburg

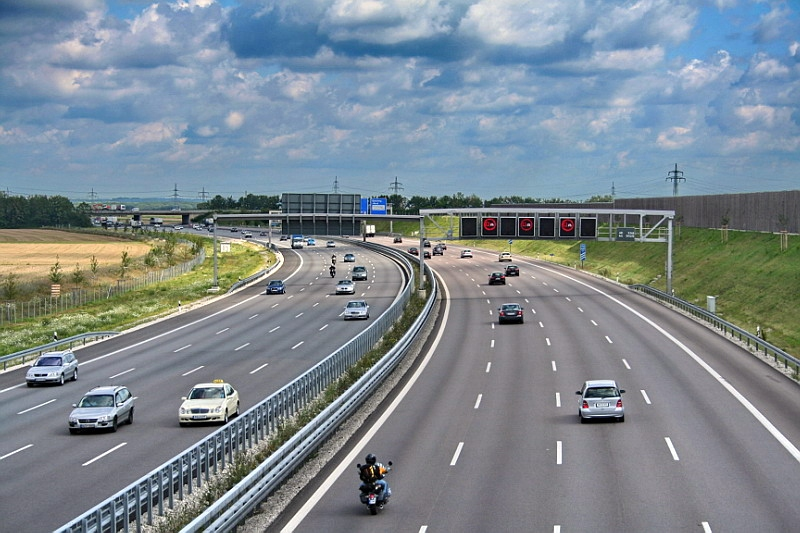
Autobahn 9 near Munich with 8 lanes

As of 2021, Germany's autobahn network has a total length of about 13,192 kilometres (8,197 mi). Longer similar systems can be found in the United States (77,960 kilometres or 48,440 miles) and in China (149,600 kilometres or 93,000 miles). However both the U.S. and China have an area nearly 30 times bigger than Germany, which demonstrates the high density of Germany's highway system..

Most sections of Germany's autobahns have two or three, sometimes four lanes in each direction in addition to an emergency lane (hard shoulder). A few sections have only two lanes in each direction without emergency lanes, and short slip-roads and ramps. Since 2009 Germany has embarked on a massive widening and rehabilitation project which aims to increase the number of lanes on many of its major arterial roads of the highway network, such as the A 5 in the southwest and A 8 going east–west.

The motorway density in Germany is 36 kilometers per thousand square kilometer in 2016, close to that of the smaller countries nearby (Netherlands, Belgium, Luxembourg, Switzerland, Slovenia).

== Facilities ==
=== Emergency telephones ===
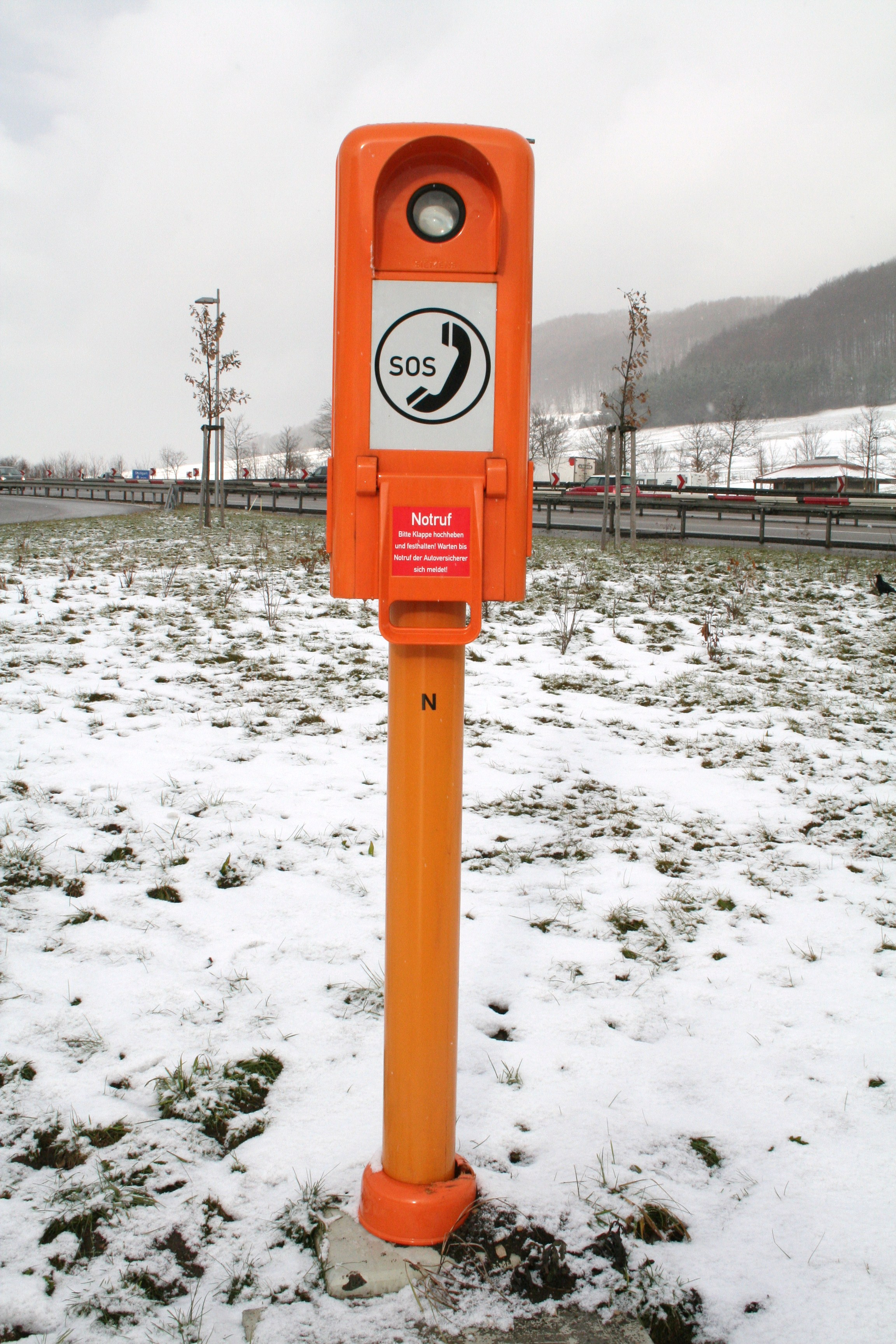
Emergency telephone

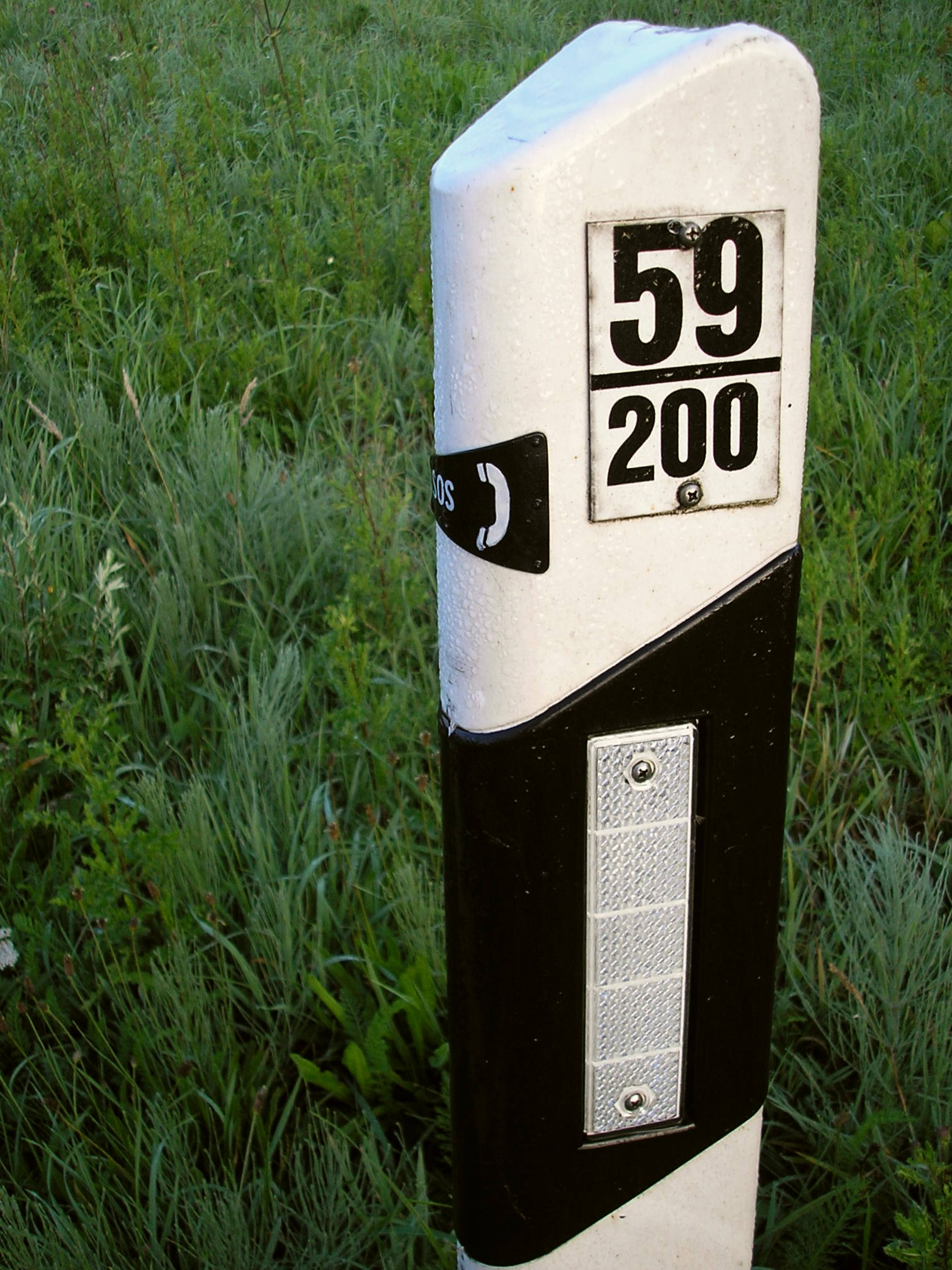
Directional arrow on a delineator

About 17,000 emergency telephones are distributed at regular intervals all along the autobahn network, with triangular stickers on the armco barriers pointing the way to the nearest one. Despite the increasing use of mobile phones, there are still about 150 calls made each day on average (after some 700 in 2013). This still equals four calls per kilometre each year. The location of the caller is automatically sent to the operator.

=== Parking, rest areas, and truck stops ===
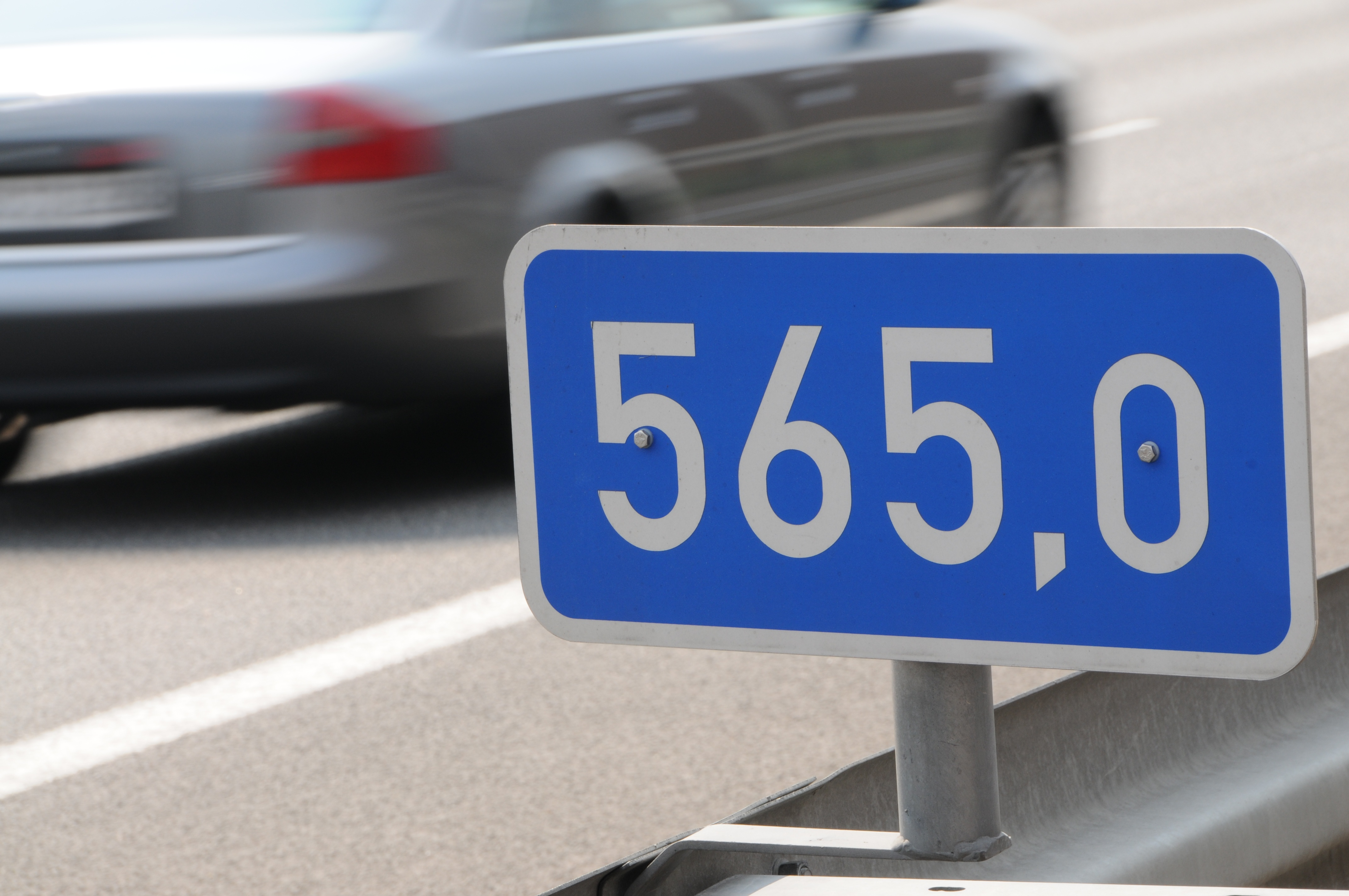
Road kilometre sign on A 6, near Mannheim

For breaks during longer journeys, parking sites, rest areas, and truck stops are distributed over the complete Autobahn network. Parking on the autobahn is prohibited in the strictest terms outside these designated areas. There is a distinction between "managed" and "unmanaged" rest areas. (German: bewirtschaftet / unbewirtschaftet).

Parking sign

Unmanaged rest areas are basically only parking spaces, sometimes with toilets. They form a part of the German highway system; the plots of land are federal property. Autobahn exits leading to such parking areas are marked at least 200 metres (660 ft) (mostly 500 metres (1,600 ft)) in advance with a blue sign with the white letter "P". They are usually found every few kilometres. Some of them bear local or historic names.

A managed rest area (German: Autobahnraststätte or Raststätte (German: [ˈʁastˌʃtɛtə]) for short) usually also includes a filling station, charging station, lavatories, toilets, and baby changes. Most rest areas also have restaurants, shops, public telephones, Internet access, and a playground. Some have hotels. Mandated every 50 kilometres (31 mi) or so, rest areas are usually open all night.

Both kinds of rest areas are directly on the autobahn, with their own exits, and any service roads connecting them to the rest of the road network are usually closed to general traffic. Apart from rare exceptions, the autobahn must not be left nor entered at rest areas.

Truck stops (German: Autohof (German: [ˈaʊ̯toˌhoːf]), plural Autohöfe (German: [ˈaʊ̯toˌhøːfə])) are large filling stations located at general exits, usually at a small distance from the autobahn, combined with fast food facilities and/or restaurants, but have no ramps of their own. They mostly sell fuel at normal price level while the Raststätten fuel prices are significantly higher.

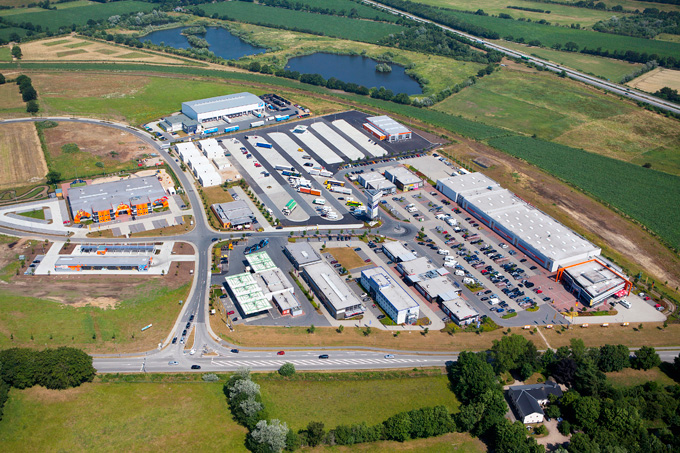
Truck stop Scandinavian Park off the A 7

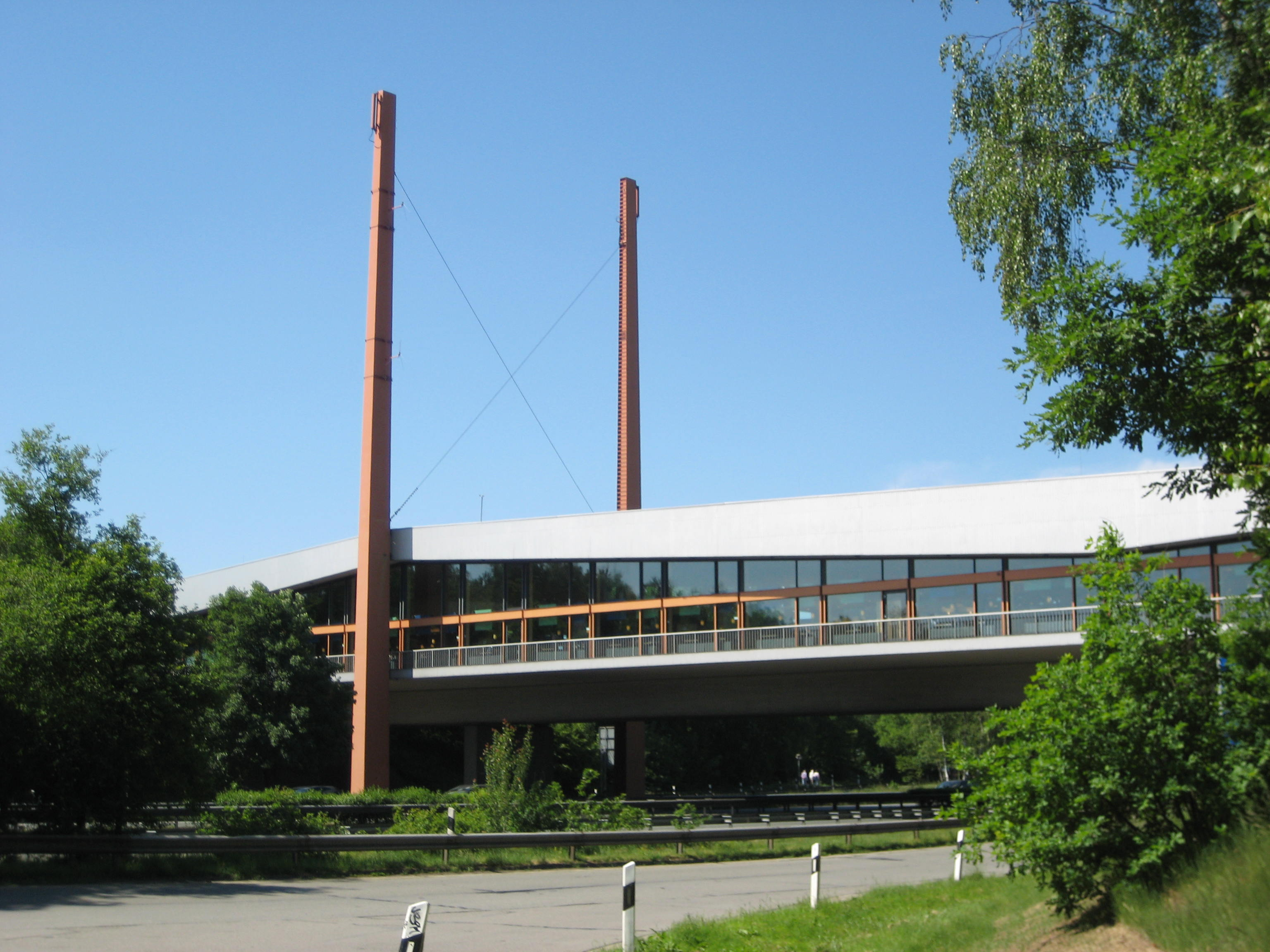
Rest area Dammer Berge on the A 1

Rest areas and truck stops are marked several times as motorists approach, starting several kilometres in advance, and include large signs that often include icons announcing what kinds of facilities travellers can expect, such as hotels, filling stations, rest areas, etc.

== Speed limits ==
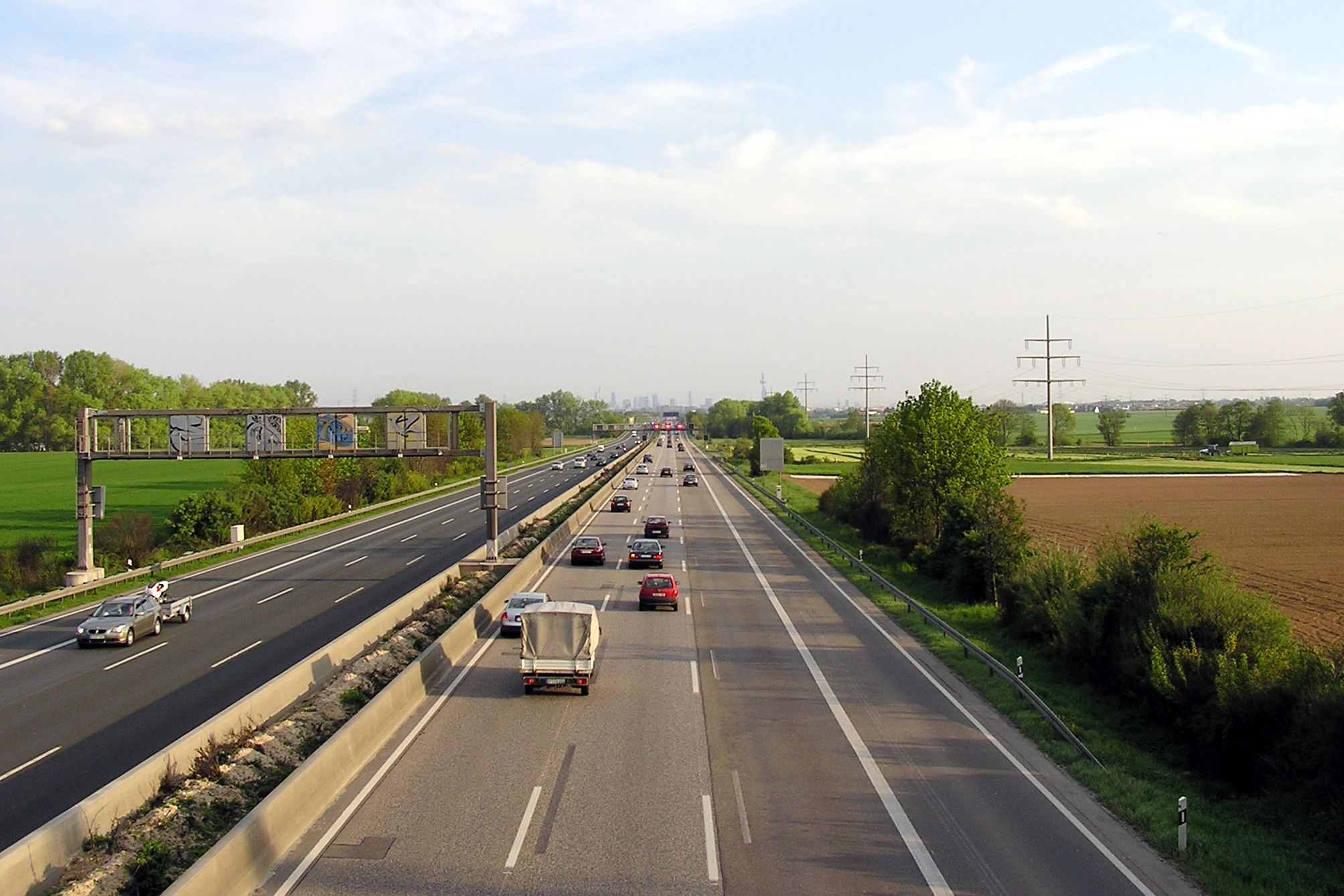
Autobahn with three separate lanes in each direction and an emergency lane

Advisory speed limit (Richtgeschwindigkeit) of 130 km/h on autobahns

"Limits no longer apply" (Ende aller Streckenverbote) sign, indicating a return to the default speed, while lifting all other limits as well (All limits are indicated by round signs with red border, as seen above.)

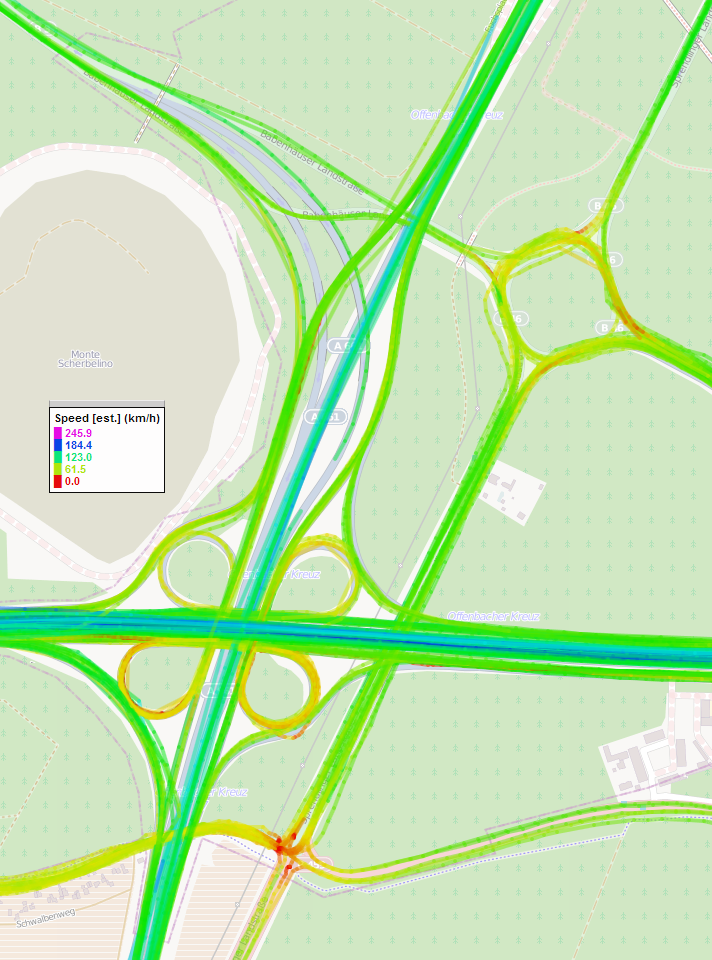
GPS tracks colored according to speed show considerable speed differences at an autobahn crossing.

Germany's autobahns are famous for being among the few public roads in the world without blanket speed limits for cars and motorcycles. As such, they are important German cultural identifiers, "often mentioned in hushed, reverential tones by motoring enthusiasts and looked at with a mix of awe and terror by outsiders." Some speed limits are implemented on different autobahns.

Certain limits are imposed on some classes of vehicles:

60 km/h (37 mph)	Buses carrying standing passengers; Motorcycles pulling trailers
80 km/h (50 mph)	Vehicles with maximum allowed weight exceeding 3.5 t (except passenger cars); Passenger cars pulling trailers; Trucks; Buses
100 km/h (62 mph)	Passenger cars pulling trailers certified for 100 km/h; Buses certified for 100 km/h not towing trailers

Additionally, speed limits are posted at most on- and off-ramps and interchanges and other danger points like sections under construction or in need of repair.

Where no general limit exists, the advisory speed limit is 130 km/h (81 mph), referred to in German as the Richtgeschwindigkeit. The advisory speed is not enforceable; however, being involved in a collision driving at higher speeds can lead to the driver being deemed at least partially responsible due to "increased operating danger" (Erhöhte Betriebsgefahr).

The Federal Road Research Institute (Bundesanstalt für Straßenwesen) solicited information about speed regulations on autobahns from the sixteen States and reported the following, comparing the years 2006 and 2008:

Parameter	2006	2008	Change
Autobahn total length	24,735 km	25,240 km	+505 km
No speed limit (advisory limit only)	69.2%	65.5%	-580 km
Variable speed limit (with advisory maximum)	4.2%	4.1%	-5 km
Permanent or temporary speed limit	26.7%	30.4%	+1,090 km

Except at construction sites, the general speed limits, where they apply, are usually between 100 km/h (62 mph) and 130 km/h (81 mph); construction sites usually have a speed limit of 80 km/h (50 mph) but the limit may be as low as 60 km/h (37 mph). In rare cases, sections may have limits of 40 km/h (25 mph), or on one ramp 30 km/h (19 mph). Certain stretches have lower speed limits during wet weather. Some areas have a speed limit of 120 km/h (75 mph) in order to reduce noise pollution during overnight hours (usually 10 pm – 6 am) or because of increased traffic during daytime (6 am – 8 pm).

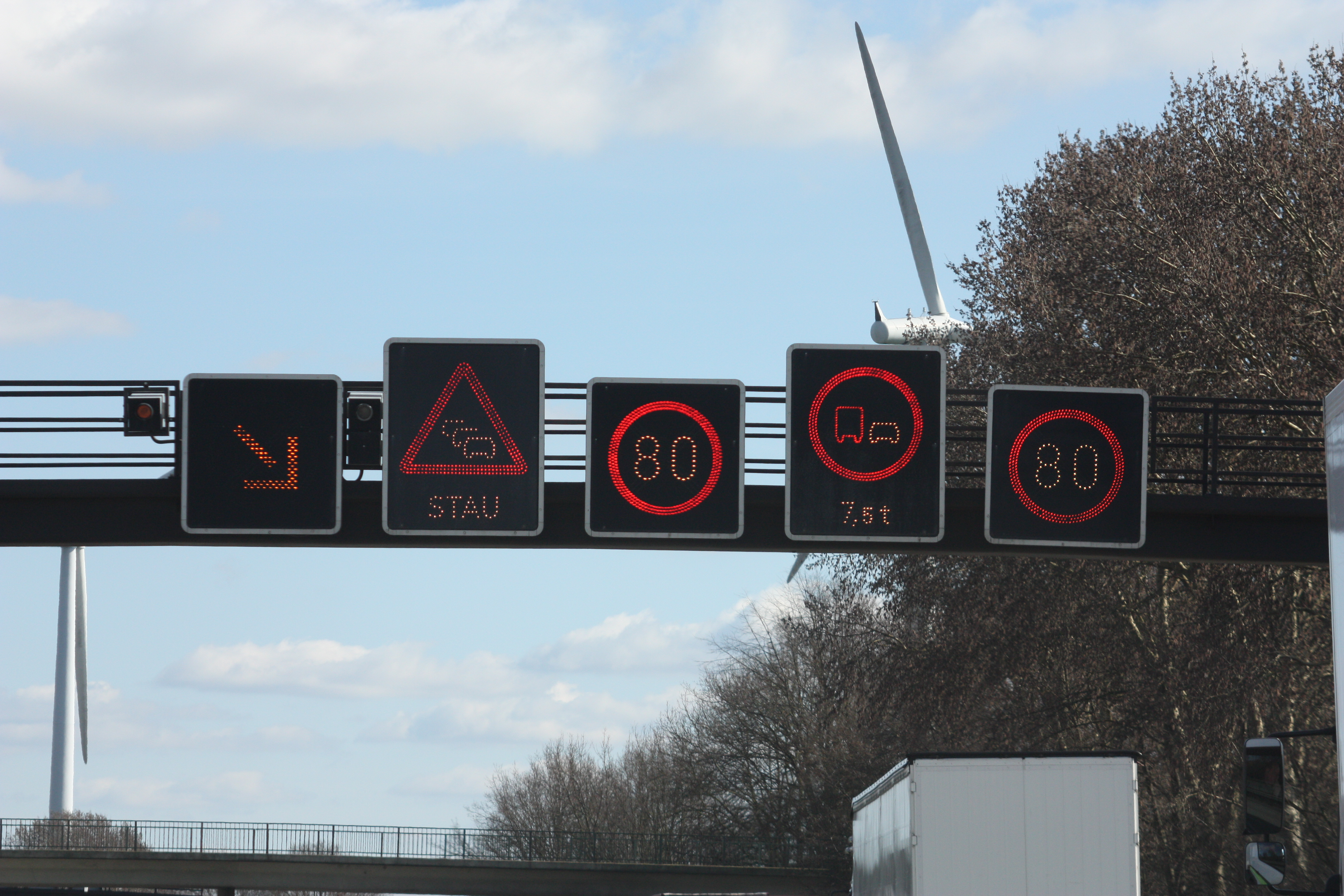
Dynamic traffic signs on an autobahn

Some limits were imposed to reduce pollution and noise. Limits can also be temporarily put into place through dynamic traffic guidance systems that display the corresponding message. More than half of the total length of the German autobahn network has no speed limit, about one third has a permanent limit, and the remaining parts have a temporary or conditional limit.

Some cars with very powerful engines can reach speeds of well over 300 km/h (190 mph). Major German car manufacturers, except Porsche, follow a gentlemen's agreement by electronically limiting the top speeds of their cars—with the exception of some top of the range models or engines—to 250 km/h (155 mph). These limiters can be deactivated, so speeds up to 300 km/h (190 mph) might arise on the German autobahn, but due to other traffic, such speeds are generally not attainable except during certain times like between 10 p.m. and 6 a.m. or on Sundays (when truck drivers have to rest by law). Furthermore, there are certain autobahn sections which are known for having light traffic, making such speeds attainable during most days (especially some of those located in Eastern Germany). Most unlimited sections of the autobahn are located outside densely populated areas.

Vehicles with a top speed less than 60 km/h (37 mph) (such as quads, low-end microcars, and agricultural/construction equipment) are not allowed to use the autobahn, nor are motorcycles and scooters with low engine capacity regardless of top speed (mainly applicable to mopeds which are typically limited to 25 kilometres per hour (16 mph) or 45 kilometres per hour (28 mph) anyway). To comply with this limit, heavy-duty trucks in Germany (e.g. mobile cranes, tank transporters etc.) often have a maximum design speed of 62 km/h (39 mph) (usually denoted by a round black-on-white sign with "62" on it), along with flashing orange beacons to warn approaching cars that they are travelling slowly. There is no general minimum speed but drivers are not allowed to drive at an unnecessarily low speed as this would lead to significant traffic disturbance and an increased collision risk.

=== Public debate ===
German national speed limits have a historical association with war-time restrictions and deprivations, the Nazi era, and the Soviet era in East Germany. After the Nazi dictatorship, German society was happy to overcome the traumas of war by freeing itself from most government restrictions, prohibitions and regulations. "Free driving for free citizens" ("freie Fahrt für freie Bürger"), a slogan promoted by the German Auto Club since the 1970s, is a popular slogan among those opposing autobahn speed restrictions. Tarek Al-Wazir, head of the Green Party in Hesse, and currently the Hessian Transport Minister has stated that "the speed limit in Germany has a similar status as the right to bear arms in the American debate. At some point, a speed limit will become reality here, and soon we will not be able to remember the time before. It's like the smoking ban in restaurants."

==== Early history ====
The Weimar Republic had no federally required speed limits. The first crossroads-free road for motorized vehicles only, now A 555 between Bonn and Cologne, had a 120 km/h (75 mph) limit when it opened in 1932. In October 1939, the Nazis instituted the first national maximum speed limit, throttling speeds to 80 km/h (50 mph) in order to conserve gasoline for the war effort. After the war, the four Allied occupation zones established their own speed limits until the divided East German and West German republics were constituted in 1949; initially, the Nazi speed limits were restored in both East and West Germany.

==== After the World Wars ====
In December 1952 the West German legislature voted to abolish all national speed limits, reverting to State-level decisions. National limits were reestablished incrementally. The 50 km/h (31 mph) urban limit was enacted in 1956, effective in 1957. The 100 km/h (62 mph) limit on rural roads—except autobahns—became effective in 1972.

==== Oil crisis of the 1970s ====
Just prior to the 1973 oil crisis, Germany, Switzerland, and Austria all had no general speed restriction on autobahns. During the crisis, like other nations, Germany imposed temporary speed restrictions; for example, 100 km/h (62 mph) on autobahns effective 13 November 1973. Automakers projected a 20% plunge in sales, which they attributed in part to the lowered speed limits. The 100 km/h limit championed by Transportation Minister Lauritz Lauritzen lasted 111 days. Adjacent nations with unlimited speed autobahns, Austria and Switzerland, imposed permanent 130 km/h (81 mph) limits after the crisis.

However, after the crisis eased in 1974, the upper house of the German parliament, which was controlled by conservative parties, successfully resisted the imposition of a permanent mandatory limit supported by Chancellor Brandt. The upper house insisted on a 130 km/h (81 mph) recommended limit until a thorough study of the effects of a mandatory limit could be conducted. Accordingly, the Federal Highway Research Institute conducted a multiple-year experiment, switching between mandatory and recommended limits on two test stretches of autobahn. In the final report issued in 1977, the Institute stated the mandatory speed limit could reduce the autobahn death toll but there would be economic impacts, so a political decision had to be made due to the trade-offs involved. At that time, the federal government declined to impose a mandatory limit. The fatality rate trend on the German autobahn mirrored those of other nations' motorways that imposed a general speed limit.

==== Environmental concerns of the 1980s ====
In the mid-1980s, acid rain and sudden forest destruction renewed debate on whether or not a general speed limit should be imposed on autobahns. A car's fuel consumption increases with high speed, and fuel conservation is a key factor in reducing air pollution. Environmentalists argued that enforcing limits of 100 km/h (62 mph) limit on autobahns and 80 km/h (50 mph) on other rural roads would save lives as well as the forest, reducing the annual death toll by 30% (250 lives) on autobahns and 15% (1,000 lives) on rural roads; the German motor vehicle death toll was about 10,000 at the time. The federal government sponsored a large-scale experiment with a 100 km/h (62 mph) speed limit in order to measure the impact of reduced speeds on emissions and compliance. Afterward, again, the federal government declined to impose a mandatory limit, deciding the modest measured emission reduction would have no meaningful effect on forest loss. By 1987, all restrictions on test sections had been removed, even in Hesse where the state government was controlled by a "red-green" coalition.

==== German reunification ====
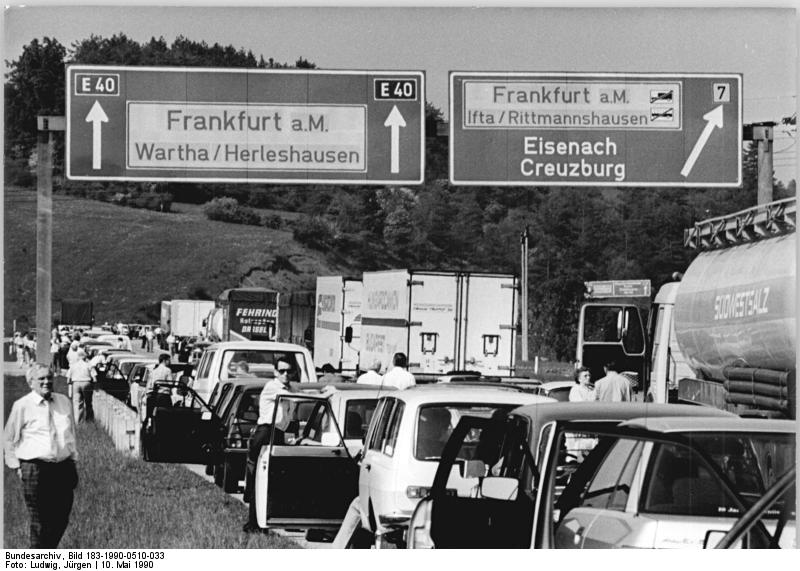
Trade unionists blocked the motorway near the Wartha-Herleshausen border crossing in protest against impending social cutbacks in 1990.

Prior to German reunification in 1990, eastern German states focused on restrictive traffic regulation such as a 100 km/h (62 mph) autobahn speed limit and of 80 km/h (50 mph) on other rural roads. Within two years after the opening, availability of high-powered vehicles and a 54% increase in motorized traffic led to a doubling of annual traffic deaths, despite "interim arrangements [which] involved the continuation of the speed limit of 100 km/h (62 mph) on autobahns and of 80 km/h (50 mph) outside cities". An extensive program of the four Es (enforcement, education, engineering, and emergency response) brought the number of traffic deaths back to pre-unification levels after a decade of effort while traffic regulations were conformed to western standards (e.g., 130 km/h (81 mph) freeway advisory limit, 100 km/h (62 mph) on other rural roads, and 0.05 percent BAC). Before reunification, East Germany prioritized traffic control over mobility, limiting car ownership and emphasizing public transport. Roads were less developed, and vehicle quality was lower. After reunification, rapid motorization overwhelmed infrastructure. The resulting spike in accidents prompted major safety reforms and modernization of traffic laws, aligning with West German standards.

==== Since reunification ====
In 1993, the Social Democratic-Green Party coalition controlling the State of Hesse experimented with a 90 km/h (56 mph) limit on autobahns and 80 km/h (50 mph) on other rural roads. These limits were attempts to reduce ozone pollution.

During his term of office (1998 to 2005) as Chancellor of Germany, Gerhard Schröder opposed an autobahn speed limit, famously referring to Germany as an Autofahrernation (a "nation of drivers").

In October 2007, at a party congress held by the Social Democratic Party of Germany, delegates narrowly approved a proposal to introduce a blanket speed limit of 130 km/h (81 mph) on all German autobahns. While this initiative is primarily a part of the SPD's general strategic outline for the future and, according to practices, not necessarily meant to affect immediate government policy, the proposal had stirred up a debate once again; Germany's chancellor since 2005, Angela Merkel, and leading cabinet members expressed outspoken disapproval of such a measure.

In 2008, the Social Democratic-Green Party coalition controlling Germany's smallest state, the paired City-State of Bremen and Bremerhaven, imposed a 120-kilometre-per-hour (75 mph) limit on its last 11 kilometres (6.8 miles) of speed-unlimited autobahn in hopes of leading other States to do likewise.

In 2011, the first-ever Green minister-president of any German state, Winfried Kretschmann of Baden-Württemberg initially argued for a similar, state-level 120 kilometres per hour (75 mph) limit. However, Baden-Württemberg is an important location for the German motor industry, including the headquarters of Daimler AG and Porsche; the ruling coalition ultimately decided against a state-level limit on its 675 kilometres (419 miles) of speed-unlimited roads—arguing for nationwide speed limit instead.

In 2014, the conservative-liberal ruling coalition of Saxony confirmed its rejection of a general speed limit on autobahns, instead advocating dynamic traffic controls where appropriate. Between 2010 and 2014 in the State of Hesse, transportation ministers Dieter Posch and his successor Florian Rentsch, both members of the Free Democratic Party, removed or raised speed limits on several sections of autobahn following regular 5-year reviews of speed limit effectiveness; some sections just prior to the installation of Tarek Al-Wazir (Green Party) as Transportation Minister in January 2014 as part of an uneasy CDU-green coalition government. In 2015, the left-green coalition government of Thuringia declared that a general autobahn limit was a federal matter; Thuringia would not unilaterally impose a general statewide limit, although the Thuringian environmental minister had recommended a 120 kilometres per hour (75 mph) limit.

In late 2015, Winfried Hermann, Baden-Württemberg's Green minister of transportation, promised to impose a trial speed limit of 120 kilometres per hour (75 mph) on about 10% of the state's autobahns beginning in May 2016. However, the ruling Green-Social Democratic coalition lost its majority in the March 2016 elections; while Mr Hermann retained his post in the new Green-Christian Democratic government, he put aside preparations for a speed limit due to opposition from his new coalition partners.

In 2019, the Green Party introduced a motion to introduce a hard 130 km/h speed limit on the autobahn, but it was defeated in the Bundestag. A second attempt to reopen debate on the issue was made by the Left Party in 2022, rejected by the majority of the opposition CDU/CSU and Alternative for Germany (AfD) and the governing Free Democratic Party (FDP). However, Alliance 90/The Greens and the SPD were obliged by their traffic light coalition with the FDP to reject the proposal.

=== Mean travel speeds ===
The federal government does not regularly measure or estimate travel speeds. One study reported in a transportation engineering journal offered historical perspective on the increase in travel speeds over a decade:

Parameters	Year		
(for light vehicles)	1982	1987	1992
Average (mean) speed	112.3 km/h (70 mph)	117.2 km/h (73 mph)	120.4 km/h (75 mph)
85th percentile speed	139.2 km/h (86 mph)	145.1 km/h (90 mph)	148.2 km/h (92 mph)
Percentage exceeding 130 km/h	25.0%	31.3%	35.9%

Source: Kellermann, G: Geschwindigkeitsverhalten im Autobahnnetz 1992. Straße+Autobahn, Issue 5/1995.

The Federal Environmental Office reported that, on a free-flowing section in 1992, the recorded average speed was 132 km/h (82 mph) with 51% of drivers exceeding the recommended speed.

In 2006, speeds were recorded using automated detection loops in the State of Brandenburg at two points: on a six-lane section of A 9 near Niemegk with a 130 km/h (81 mph) advisory speed limit; and on a four-lane section of A 10 bypassing Berlin near Groß Kreutz with a 120 km/h (75 mph) mandatory limit.

The results were:

Average speed	Autobahn cross-section	
Speed regulation	130 km/h advisory	120 km/h mandatory
Vehicle class	A 9 (6 lanes)	A 10 (4 lanes)
Automobiles	141.8 km/h (88 mph)	116.5 km/h (72 mph)
Trucks	88.2 km/h (55 mph)	88.0 km/h (55 mph)
Buses	97.7 km/h (61 mph)	94.4 km/h (59 mph)
All vehicles	131.9 km/h (82 mph)	110.1 km/h (68 mph)

At peak times on the "free-flowing" section of A 9, over 60% of road users exceeded the recommended 130 km/h (81 mph) maximum speed, more than 30% of motorists exceeded 150 km/h (93 mph), and more than 15% exceeded 170 km/h (106 mph)—in other words the so-called "85th-percentile speed" was in excess of 170 km/h.

== Safety ==
In 2014, autobahns carried 31% of motorized road traffic while accounting for 11% of Germany's traffic deaths. The autobahn fatality rate of 1.6 deaths per billion travel-kilometres compared favorably with the 4.6 rate on urban streets and 6.5 rate on rural roads. However, these types of roads are not comparable according to German traffic researcher Bernhard Schlag: "You don't have some of the problems that are accident-prone there at all. No cyclists, no pedestrians, no crossing traffic, hardly any direct oncoming traffic. In that sense, it's not surprising that autobahns are relatively safe roads [compared to other road types]."

According to official statistics from 2018, unlimited highways in Germany claimed about 71% of fatalities on highways. However, autobahns without speed limits also account for 70% of the entire autobahn network, which puts the high proportion of collision fatalities on stretches without speed limits into perspective. The often resulting thinking that speed limits would not make roads significantly safer, however, is a fallacy, since it is precisely those roads that have a high volume of traffic and thus a high risk of collisions that are given speed limits.

According to Schlag, unsafe and older drivers, in particular, would avoid the autobahn because they perceive the large speed differentials and very fast drivers as scary, and instead congregate on rural roads where the risk of collisions is higher anyway.

In contrast to other road types, where the number of collisions has continuously decreased, the number of collisions on autobahns has remained relatively stable or even increased for several years since 2009.

According to a report by the Federal Statistical Office, fast driving is the main cause of collisions on autobahns.

According to the 2018 edition of the European Road Safety Observatory's Traffic Safety Basic Facts report, an above-average number of crashes end in fatalities on a 1000-kilometer stretch of highway in Germany compared to other EU countries.

Although Germany has a very low total traffic-related death rate, if only the mortality rate on highways is considered, Germany is in the rear midfield in a Europe-wide comparison of the number of traffic fatalities per thousand kilometers driven on highways in 2016. In addition, Germany's percentage of fatalities that occurred on highways is above the EU average.

An evaluation by the Deutscher Verkehrssicherheitsrat shows that in 2016 statistically 26% fewer people died on autobahns with a speed limit per kilometer than on autobahns without. A similar trend could be observed in the number of serious injuries.

Between 1970 and 2010, overall German road fatalities decreased by almost 80% from 19,193 to 3,648; over the same time period, autobahn deaths halved from 945 to 430 deaths. Statistics for 2013 show total German traffic deaths had declined to the lowest count ever recorded: 3,340 (428 on autobahns); a representative of the Federal Statistical Office attributed the general decline to harsh winter weather that delayed the start of the motorcycle-riding season. In 2014, there was a total of 3,377 road fatalities, while autobahn deaths dropped to 375.

Road class	Injury crashes	Fatalities	Injury rate*	Fatality rate*	Fatalities per 1000 injury crashes
Autobahn	18,901	375	0.082	1.6	19.8
Urban	209,618	983	1.052	4.9	4.7
Rural	73,916	2,019	0.238	6.5	27.3
Total	302,435	3,377	0.408	4.6	11.2

* per 1,000,000,000 travel-kilometres

In 2012, the leading cause of autobahn crashes was "excessive speed (for conditions)": 6,587 so-called "speed related" crashes claimed the lives of 179 people, which represents almost half (46.3%) of 387 autobahn fatalities that year. However, "excessive speed" does not mean that a speed limit has been exceeded, but that police determined at least one party travelled too fast for existing road or weather conditions. On autobahns 22 people died per 1,000 injury crashes, a lower rate than the 29 deaths per 1,000 injury collisions on conventional rural roads, which in turn is five times higher than the risk on urban roads—speeds are higher on rural roads and autobahns than urban roads, increasing the severity potential of a crash.

=== Safety: international comparison ===
A few countries publish the safety record of their motorways; the Federal Highway Research Institute provided IRTAD statistics for the year 2012:

International	Killed per 1,000,000,000 veh·km	
Country	All roads	Motorways
Austria	6.88	1.73
Belgium	7.67	2.07
Czech Republic	15.73	2.85
Denmark	3.40	0.72
Finland	4.70	1.94
France		1.70
Germany	5.00	1.74
Slovenia	7.77	3.17
Switzerland	5.60	2.90
Taiwan (2019)		2.30
United Kingdom	3.56	1.16
United States	7.02	3.38

For example, a person yearly traversing 15,000 kilometres (9,300 mi) on regular roads and 10,000 kilometres (6,200 mi) on motorways has an approximately 1 in 11,000 chance of dying in a car collision on a German road in any particular year (1 in 57,000 on an autobahn), compared to 1 in 3,800 in Czech Republic, 1 in 17,000 in Denmark, or 1 in 7,200 in the United States.

However, there are many differences between countries in their geography, economy, traffic growth, highway system size, degree of urbanization and motorization, and so on.

The European Union publishes statistics reported by its members.

== Road tolls ==
On 1 January 2005, a new system came into effect which imposed mandatory road tolls (Mautpflicht) on heavy trucks (those weighing more than 12 t) which are using the German Autobahn system (LKW-Maut). The German government contracted with a private company, Toll Collect GmbH, to operate the toll collection system, which has involved the use of vehicle-mounted transponders and roadway-mounted sensors installed throughout Germany. The toll is calculated depending on the toll route, as well as based on the pollution class of the vehicle, its weight and the number of axles on the vehicles. Certain vehicles, such as emergency vehicles and buses, are exempt from the toll. An average user is charged €0.15 per kilometre, or about $0.31 per mile (Toll Collect, 2007).

== Traffic laws and enforcement ==
One of the most common signs in the Autobahn (No passing for vehicles over 3.5 t) indicates truck drivers restricted for overtaking.

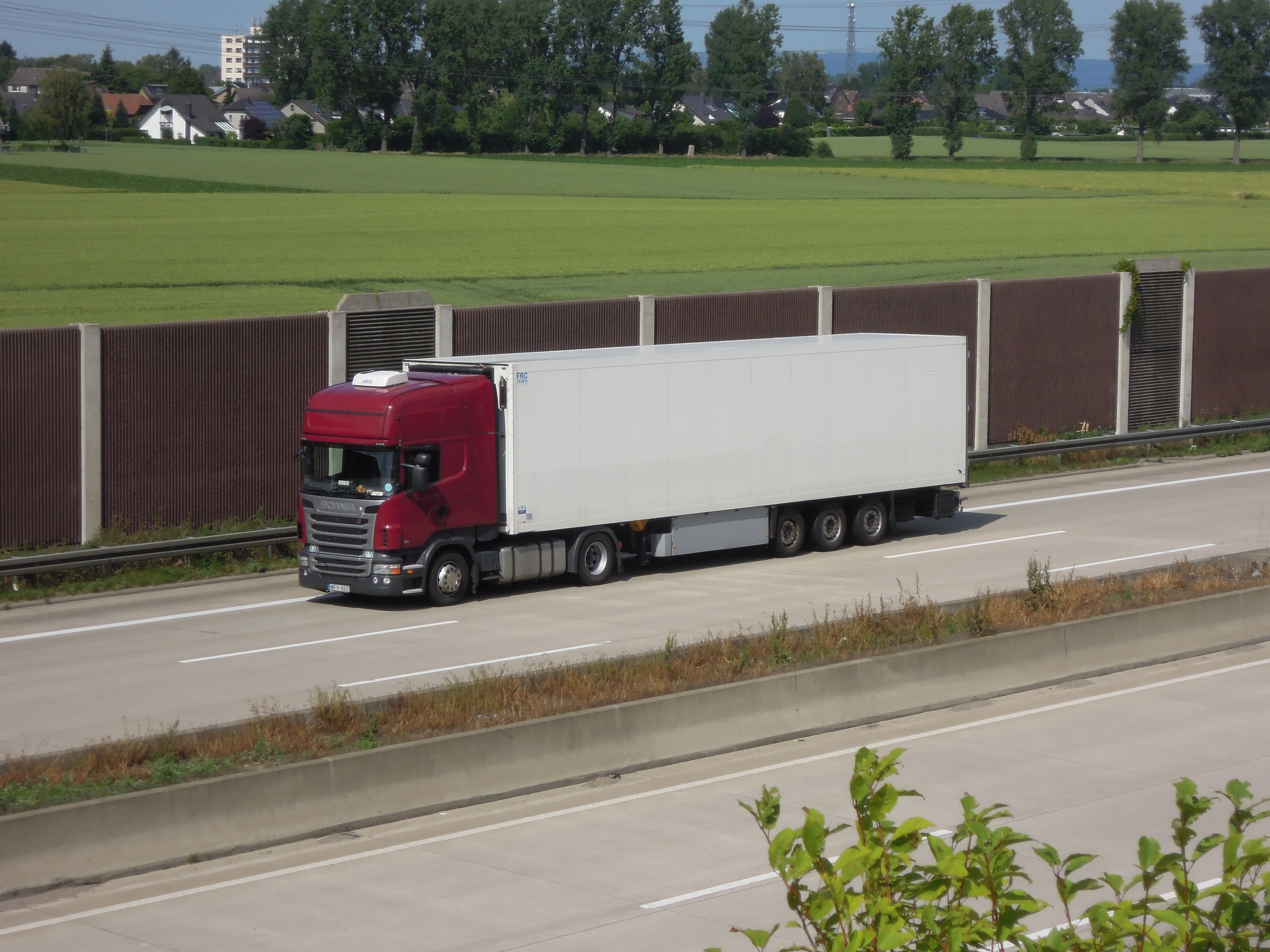
Trucks (Lorries) in Germany are often referred to as "LKW", short for Lastkraftwagen and mostly drive on the right lane.

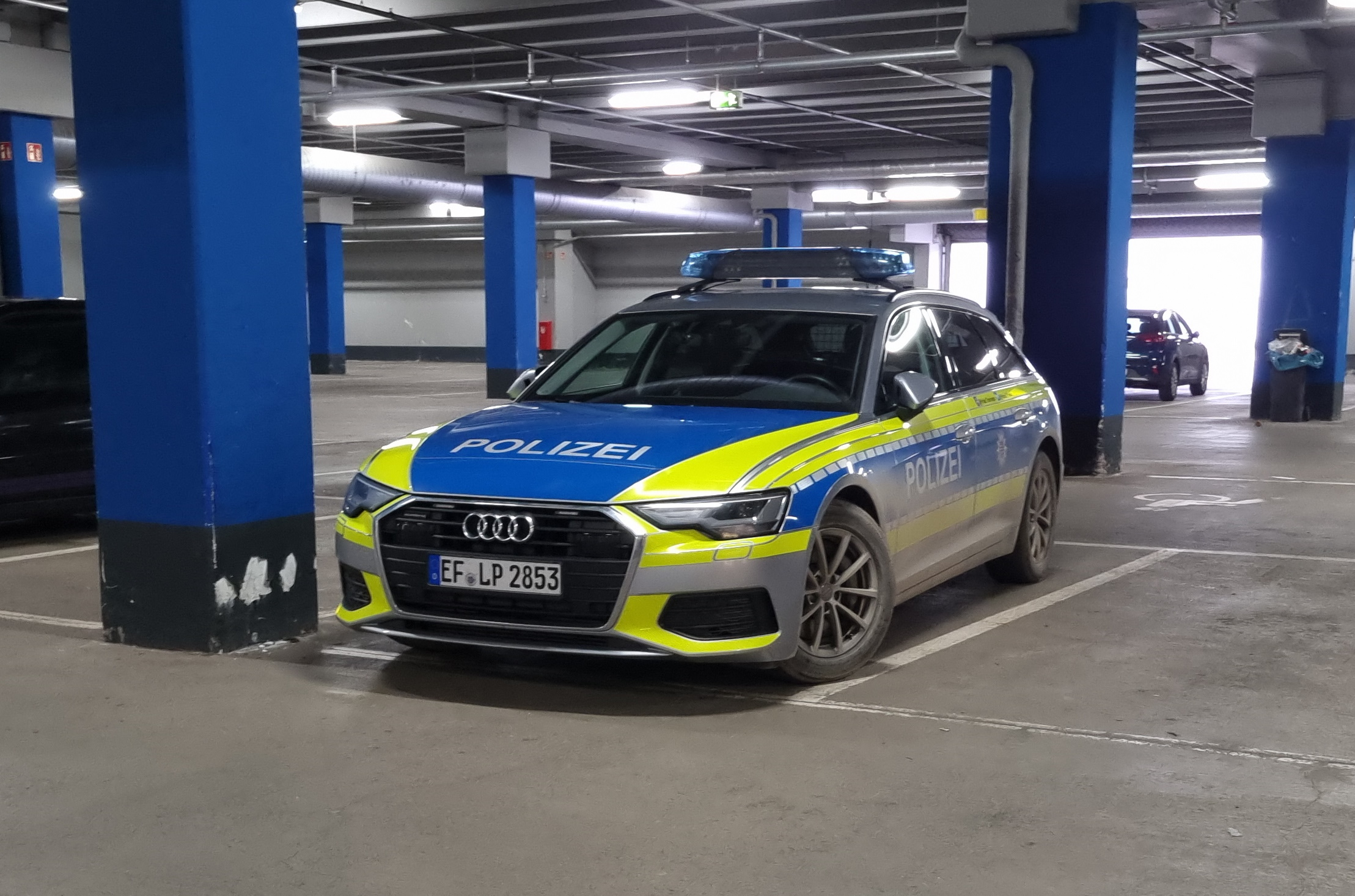
Contemporary patrol car, an Audi A6 Avant, used for policing on Autobahns in Thuringia

Driving in Germany is regulated by the Straßenverkehrs-Ordnung (road traffic regulations, abbreviated StVO). Enforcement on the federal Autobahnen is handled by each state's highway patrol (Autobahnpolizei), often using unmarked police cars and motorcycles and usually equipped with video cameras, thus allowing easier enforcement of laws such as tailgating.

=== Notable laws ===
- The right lane should be used when it is free (Rechtsfahrgebot) and the left lane is generally intended only for overtaking unless traffic is too dense to justify driving only on the right lane. It is legal to give a short horn or light signal (flashing headlights or Lichthupe) in order to indicate the intention of overtaking, but a safe distance to the vehicle in front must be maintained, otherwise this might be regarded as an act of coercion.
- Trucks and buses only drive on the right lane, this is common throughout Europe wherever two travel lanes in a direction are present. Trucks are well known for doing the "Elephant Race" (Elefantenrennen [eleˈfantn̩ˌʁɛnən]), which has little to do with actual elephants. This occurs when one truck tries to overtake another with a minimum speed difference. However on sections with three or more travel lanes in a direction, trucks and buses are prohibited from using the farthest left lane, except to access a route inaccessible from the right and/or center lanes. In some places which are indicated by signs, truck drivers are not allowed to overtake at all.
- Penalties for tailgating were increased in May 2006 to a maximum of €375 and three months' license suspension: "drivers must keep a distance in metres that is equal to half their speed. For example, a driver going 100 km/h on the autobahn must keep a distance of at least 50 metres (165 feet)". The penalty increase followed uproar after an infamous fatal crash on Autobahn 5 in 2003. In a traffic jam, drivers must form a rescue lane (Rettungsgasse [ˈʁɛtʊŋsˌɡasə]) to allow emergency services to reach the scene of a crash. This emergency corridor is to be created on the dividing line between the two leftmost lanes; following the guiding principle of if on the left, drive left, else drive right, vehicles may cross into another lane if need be.
- It is unlawful to stop for any reason on the autobahn, except for emergencies and when unavoidable, like traffic jams or being involved in a collision. This includes stopping on emergency lanes. Running out of fuel is considered an avoidable occurrence, as by law there are petrol stations directly on the autobahn approximately every 50–55 km (31–34 mi). Drivers may face fines and up to six months' suspension, should it come to a stop that was deemed unnecessary by the police. In some cases (if there is a direct danger to life and limb or property e.g. cars and highway infrastructure) it may also be considered a crime and the driver could receive a prison sentence (up to 5 years).
- Overtaking on the right (undertaking) is strictly forbidden, except when stuck in traffic jams. Up to a speed of 60 km/h (37 mph), if the left lane is crowded or driving slowly, it is permitted to pass cars on the right side if the speed difference is not greater than 20 km/h (12 mph) or the vehicle on the left lane is stationary. This is not referred to as overtaking, but driving past because of the limited speed differential. Even if the car overtaken is illegally occupying the left-hand lane, it is not an acceptable excuse; in such cases, the police will routinely stop and fine both drivers. However, exceptions can and have sometimes been made.

== In popular culture ==
=== Film and television ===
- Alarm für Cobra 11 – Die Autobahnpolizei (Alarm for Cobra 11 – The Autobahn Police, 1996–), a famous German TV series focusing on the work of a team of motorway police officers and their investigations, set in the autobahn-intertwined Rhine-Ruhr metropolitan area.
- Reichsautobahn (documentary/b&w) by Hartmut Bitomsky (West Germany, 1986)

=== Music ===
- "Autobahn", a song and album by German electronic band Kraftwerk (1974)
- "Autobahn", a song by South Korean boy band Monsta X Under their tenth extended play "No Limit" (2021)
- "Autobahn", a song by Song Mingi, released under his first EP "Fix Off Desire Project 1" (2025)
- "Autobahn", a song by Kim Petras as part of her "Rare N' Deluxe" version of her album Detour (2026).

=== Video games ===
Need for Speed: ProStreet and Burnout Dominator use the Autobahn as one of their tracks. Euro Truck Simulator, German Truck Simulator, and Euro Truck Simulator 2 feature the Autobahn in their open world maps. Burnout Dominator divided them into two (Autobahn and Autobahn Loop). Need for Speed: Porsche Unleashed also had a track that had the player drive across different sections of the Autobahn. The entire game world of Crash Time: Autobahn Pursuit is set on the Autobahn. In Gran Turismo 5, Gran Turismo 6 and Gran Turismo 7, a trophy is awarded to those who have driven the same distance as the Autobahn total length. In December 2010 video game developer Synetic GmbH and Conspiracy Entertainment released the title Alarm für Cobra 11 – Die Autobahnpolizei featuring real world racing and mission-based gameplay. It is taken from the popular German television series about a two-man team of Autobahnpolizei first set in Berlin then later in North Rhine-Westphalia. Autobahn Police Simulator is a 2015 German police driving simulation game set on the Autobahn.

== See also ==
- Reichsautobahn
- Transport in Germany
- List of autobahns in Germany
- List of controlled-access highway systems
- Evolution of motorway construction in European nations
