= 2003 in German television =

This is a list of German television related events from 2003.

== Events ==
- 7 March - Lou is selected to represent Germany at the 2003 Eurovision Song Contest with her song "Let's Get Happy". She is selected to be the forty-eighth German Eurovision entry during Countdown Grand Prix held at the Ostseehalle in Kiel.
- 8 March - Alexander Klaws wins the first season of Deutschland sucht den Superstar.
- 17 March - Release date of Alexander Klaws' debut single, "Take Me Tonight".
- 7 July - Jan Geilhufe wins the fourth season of Big Brother Germany.

== Debuts ==
=== Domestic ===
- 18 April - In der Mitte eines Lebens (2003) (ZDF)
- 17 September - Der Fürst und das Mädchen (2002–2007) (ZDF)

=== International ===
- 2 September - (United States) Scrubs (2001–2010) (ProSieben)
- 23 September - (Canada) What About Mimi? (2000–2002) (KiKa)
- 29 September - (Canada) Caillou (1997–2010) (Super RTL)
- (United States) Malcolm in the Middle (2000-2006) (Unknown)

=== BFBS ===
- (United Kingdom) Boohbah (2003–2006)
- (United Kingdom) Yoko! Jakamoko! Toto! (2003–2005)

== Television shows ==
=== 1950s ===
- Tagesschau (1952–present)

=== 1960s ===
- heute (1963–present)

=== 1970s ===
- heute-journal (1978–present)
- Tagesthemen (1978–present)

=== 1980s ===
- Wetten, dass..? (1981-2014)
- Lindenstraße (1985–present)

=== 1990s ===
- Gute Zeiten, schlechte Zeiten (1992–present)
- Marienhof (1992–2011)
- Unter uns (1994–present)
- Verbotene Liebe (1995-2015)
- Schloss Einstein (1998–present)
- In aller Freundschaft (1998–present)
- Wer wird Millionär? (1999–present)

=== 2000s ===
- Big Brother Germany (2000-2011, 2015–present)
- Deutschland sucht den Superstar (2002–present)

== Networks and services ==
=== Launches ===
Network	Type	Launch date	Notes	Source
sonneklar.TV	Cable television	1 March		
Syfy	Cable television	1 September		
Silverline Movie Channel	Cable television	18 November		

== See also ==
- 2003 in Germany
