= Autobahn Police Simulator =

2015 video game

- Official DVD-ROM cover art
- Developer: Z-Software
- Publisher: Aerosoft
- Platforms: Microsoft Windows, iOS, PS4
- Release: 26 August 2015
- Genres: Simulation, casual, open-world
- Mode: Single-player

Autobahn Police Simulator (German original title: Autobahn Polizei Simulator) is a police driving simulation game developed by Z-Software and published by Aerosoft. The sequel of the game was released on 7 December 2017.

The game is set on the German Autobahn.

== Gameplay ==
Autobahn Police Simulator supports a gaming steering wheel and includes both a third-person and first-person view as well as male and female characters. During gameplay, players are able to use the "follow me" sign to flag down suspicious cars. Players can secure accidents, inspect truck loads, verify TÜV (MOT) inspection stickers, and check for alcohol or drugs. There are 40 missions in the game and free play mode is available. Players can also explore the world on foot. There are also in-game radio communications and a day and night cycle.
