= Learning Resource Server Medicine =

The Learning Resource Server Medicine (LRSMed) is a free-to-access catalog of electronic learning and teaching software modules for education in medicine and dentistry available in English and German.

== History ==
The LRSMed was developed at the Institut für Medizinische Informatik, Biometrie und Epidemiologie (IMIBE) of the University Duisburg-Essen, Germany, within the joint research project "Vision 2003", funded by the German Ministry for Education and Research.

== Content ==
The LRSMed included electronic learning and teaching software modules for education in medicine and dentistry, which were deployed on the World Wide Web free of charge. The learning resources were described with a quasi-standard of metadata, the IMS Learning Resource Meta-data Information Model. Users could search for entries using several parameters as the medical field, type of learning resource and language.

== Status ==
The LRSMed was maintained at the Institut für Medizinische Informationsverarbeitung, Biometrie und Epidemiologie (IBE) of the Ludwig-Maximilians-Universität München, Germany (September 2013). As of 22 October 2013, 1705 learning resources were registered. The LRSMed was evaluated or used in several independent studies. The LRSMed was deactivated in summer 2023.
