= Silverline Movie Channel =

German-Language TV channel

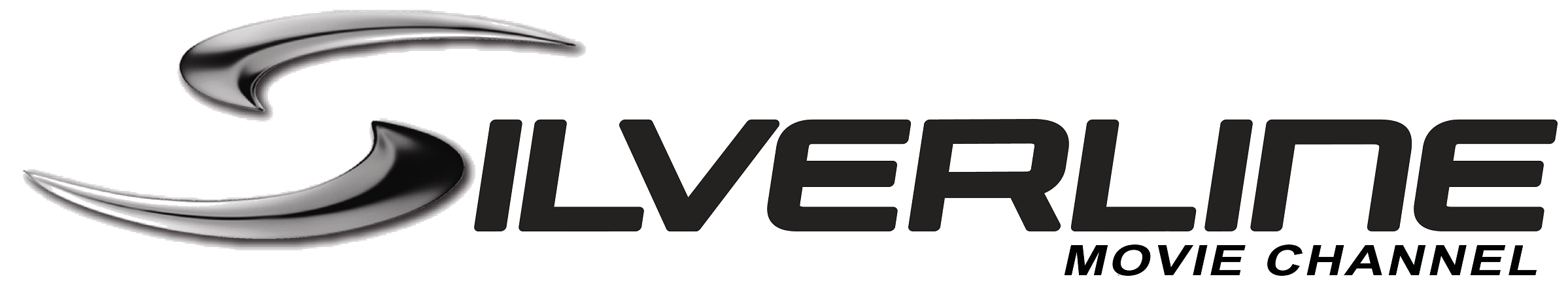
- Country: Germany
- Broadcast area: Germany, Austria, Switzerland
- Headquarters: Grünwald, Germany

Programming
- Language(s): German
- Picture format: 576i (16:9 SDTV); 1080i (HDTV)

Ownership
- Owner: Silverline Television AG

History
- Launched: 18 November 2003; 21 years ago

Links
- Website: www.silverline.tv

Availability

Streaming media
- Magine TV (Germany): -

Silverline Movie Channel is a German-language pay-TV station which broadcasts feature films from the areas of action, horror, martial arts, science fiction and Z movies. The station was founded by the Silverline Television AG, based in Grünwald (near Munich). The channel is availvable on cable and IPTV network in German-speaking Europe.

A variant of the channel for Eastern Europe and other international markets is also planned, for which a second playout will be built. Negotiations with platform operators are ongoing. Programmes will be shown in English with subtitles.

== Programming ==
The channel exclusively shows feature films of the genres action, horror, martial arts and science fiction. There are no making-of's and no advertising. The films are faded.

The Silverline Movie Channel collaborates with filmmakers from all over the world. The majority of films come from the US and Asia. The program also includes films from Europe and Latin America.

== Broadcasting ==
The Silverline Movie Channel is available on Kabel Deutschland, Kabelkiosk, Unitymedia, Swisscable, Magine TV and Telekom Entertain.
