= Henry Schmill =

Otto Hinrich ("Henry") Schmill (1925, Germany – September 14, 2003, at Essen, Germany) was a German mining engineer who emigrated to England. He was the founder of the Amalgamated Construction Ltd (AMCO) and majority owner of the Tolent Construction Ltd.

== Life ==
Henry Schmill was born in Germany 1925. His father was Otto Schmill, a dairy tenant from Mecklenburg. His mother was Gertrud Alexandrine Schmill (née Hörder). Schmill began his career in 1945 working as a miner in the German Ruhr valley. From 1948 to 1952 he studied Mining Engineering at the Technical University of Aachen where he became a favoured student of Professor Carl Hellmut Fritzsche. 1952 Schmill graduated as Diploma Ingenieur and joined Thyssen Schachtbau GmbH. 11 years later he came to the United Kingdom as a senior engineer with Thyssen Shaft Sinking Ltd, a subcompany of the Thyssen AG. Schmill founded Amalgamated Construction Ltd (AMCO) in 1970 initially working for the National Coal Board on the construction of shafts, drifts and roadways. Later the firm expanded into other engineering fields with the decline in the mining industry. In the mid1990s Schmill bought the AIM-listed Tolent PLC, a Tyneside AMCO rival, before it was demerged in 1999. In 2002 AMCO and Tolent had a combined turnover of approximately £217 million and employed 1675 people.

== O H Schmill medal and AMCO bursary ==
=== O H Schmill medal ===
The O H Schmill medal originated in 1999 through Henry Schmill. The medal is double sided and is awarded from time to time at the discretion of the Council of the Midland Institute of Mining Engineers as recommended by its Finance and Awards committee. The medal shall be awarded to any person whether or not a member of the Institution who in the opinion of Council has made a significant and worthy contribution to the affairs of the Midland Institute of Mining Engineers.

=== AMCO bursary ===
A Declaration of trust dated 11 November 1999 was made by the Midland Institute of Mining Engineers to set up a bursary. The idea of a bursary was that of Henry Schmill. The AMCO Corporation made a gift of £100,000 to be placed on permanent endowment to fund the Bursary. Bursaries are awarded from endowment income. Registered Charity Number by the Charity Commission for England and Wales: 1080526

== Awards ==
- 1993: 'Thos. W. Adam Medal' by The Midland Institute of Mining Engineers
- 2001: 'George Herbert Peake Medal' by The Midland Institute of Mining Engineers

== Memberships ==
- The Midland Institute of Mining Engineers
- Advisory Councillor, The Federal Trust
