= Borovsko Bridge =

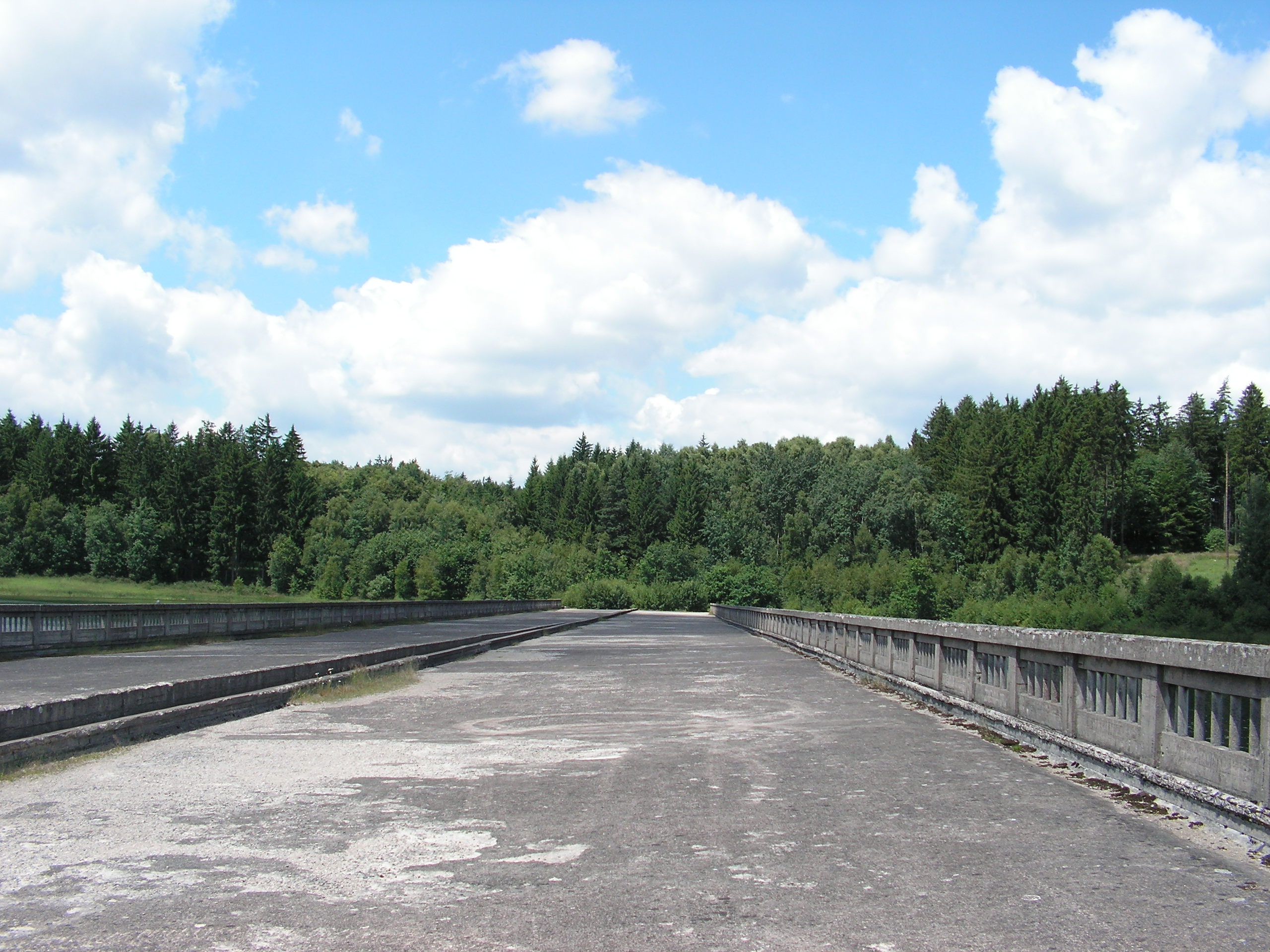
- Coordinates: 49°41′57″N 15°06′06″E
- Carries: never finished
- Crosses: Sedlický River (originally)
- Locale: Bernatice, Czech Republic

Statistics
- Daily traffic: none

Location
- Interactive map of Borovsko Bridge

The Borovsko Bridge (Czech: Borovský most) is an unfinished highway bridge near Borovsko, part of Bernartice municipality, Central Bohemian Region, Czech Republic. It is commonly known as the "Czech Avignon" or "Hitler's Bridge".

The original bridge over the Sedlický River near Borovsko was under construction at KM 59 of the highway between 1939–1942 and 1948–1950. Construction commenced in July 1939 by the civil engineering company "ing. J. Domanský". The planned budget was 5,552,400 crowns. Despite most civil engineering projects in Czechoslovakia being halted after the German invasion of the Soviet Union in 1941, in order that material scheduled for them could be diverted to the Nazi war effort, the construction of the bridge continued, although it was halted after the assassination of Reinhard Heydrich, the Nazi overlord of Czechoslovakia. Under the Communist regime which came about at the end of World War II, construction resumed, even though the emphasis at the time was on heavy industry and railroads rather than on automobile travel.

The bridge itself was completed at the end of 1950 and formally approved by the authorities in 1952. However, highway construction was suspended in the 1950s, the southern approach ramp was never finished, and the bridge was abandoned.

The 1960s brought new hope for the Borovsko Bridge and Czech highways. At the time, a project for a new large drinking-water reservoir for Prague was under consideration. Natural supply provided a high quality of water but a huge artificial lake was to flood a number of valleys, including two valleys where the Borovsko Bridge and the smaller neighbouring Sedmpanský Bridge were situated. Various scenarios were examined. One of them was reducing the lake size, but the city of Prague required millions of litres of drinking water. The other option was hydro-insulation of the bridge construction, but this approach was almost as costly as building a new bridge, even without considering the cost of water protection in case of accident etc. Finally, the decision was made to bypass the valley and to build a completely new bridge 1.4 km upriver to the south.

The dam has been in operation since 1976 and the sector of the D1 highway since 1977. The Borovsko Bridge and the Sedmpanský Bridge were abandoned, as were the routes a few kilometres west and east from the bridges' location. Today, most of the height of the Borovsko Bridge is flooded, leaving the roadway just a few meters above the water. The bridge rests unseen in the middle of the forests of the Bohemian-Moravian Highlands, as the whole lake district is a forbidden area and entry is strictly prohibited to protect the watershed.
