= Accident on the Bundesautobahn 5 =

2003 traffic collision near Karlsruge, Germany

Coordinates: 49°04′26″N 8°30′40″E

The accident on the Bundesautobahn 5 occurred on 14 July 2003 close to Karlsruhe, Germany, when a young mother lost control of her car on Bundesautobahn 5 and collided with a tree. The 21-year-old woman and her two-year-old daughter died at the scene. The accident and the following judicial proceeding received nationwide attention after eyewitnesses stated that another vehicle had closed the gap to her from behind with excessive speed and caused the accident. The case was known in the media as Autobahnraser-Fall ("motorway speeder case") and sparked a debate about setting a general speed limit on German motorways, which are generally without a legally mandated limit.

== Accident ==
On 14 July 2003, around 6 a.m., a 21-year-old woman was travelling with her two-year-old daughter on the Autobahn 5 from Karlsruhe towards Frankfurt am Main. A short distance before Bruchsal, she lost control of her car, a small Kia, left the road to the right and crashed into trees behind the traffic barrier. Although the Autobahnpolizei, paramedics, an emergency physician and Feuerwehr arrived shortly after, they were not able to rescue the victims; both had died instantly as a result of the collision. Eyewitnesses driving in the same direction reported to police that a dark coloured vehicle, possibly a Mercedes-Benz, had approached the woman's subcompact car with high speed without keeping safety distance, which is mandatory in Germany at higher speeds. Expert evidence later stated this was causal for the woman's driving mistake, as she likely jerked her steering wheel in panic, trying to avoid a rear-end collision.

== Investigation ==
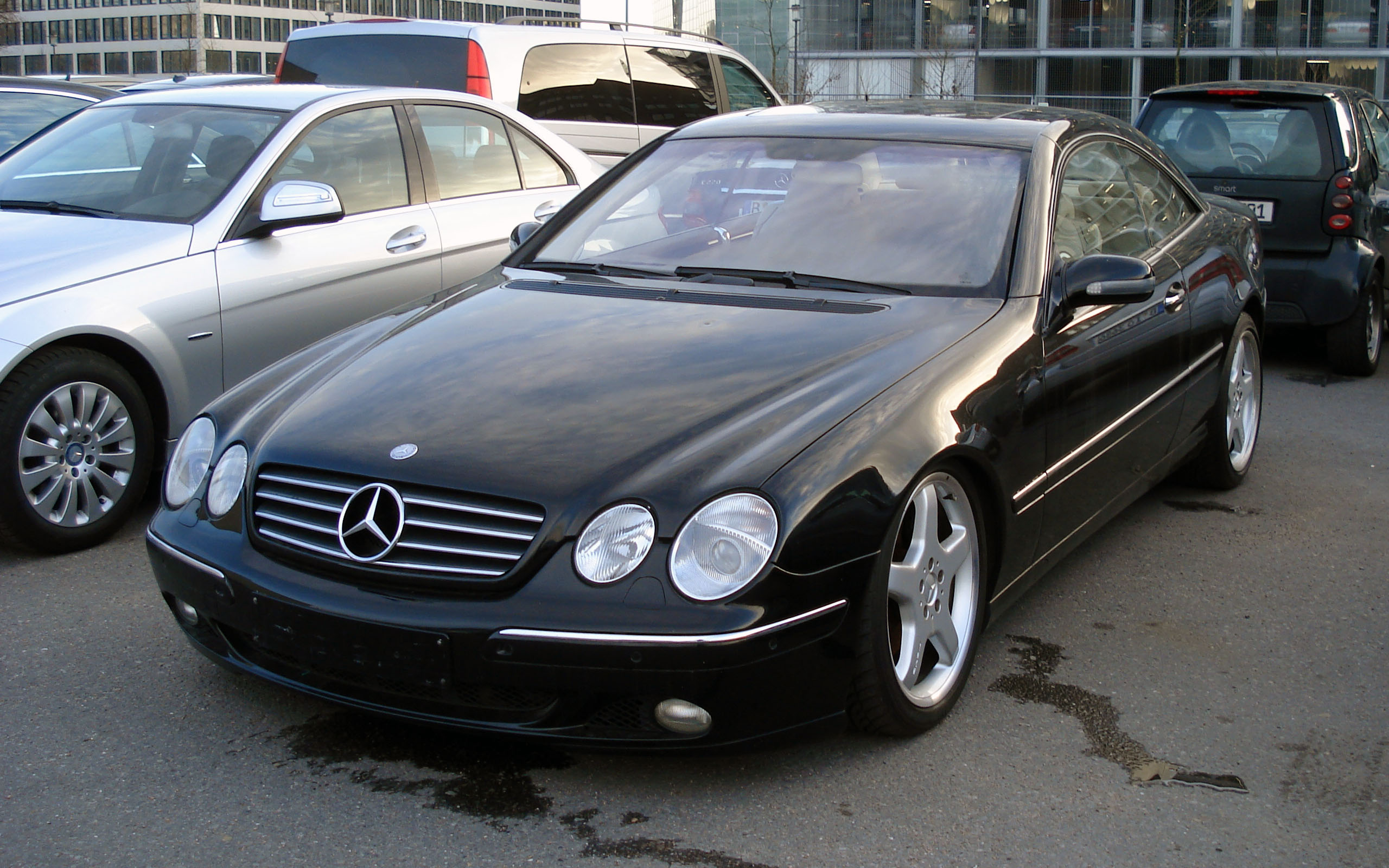
Mercedes-Benz CL Coupé – the person who caused the accident was driving a car of this type

A police task force with 42 members was formed and concentrated their search on a dark coloured Mercedes-Benz sedan or coupe, based on the witnesses declarations. A 34-year-old Mercedes-Benz test driver, Rolf Fischer, became suspect soon when it turned out he used the Autobahn 5 around the same time that morning with his dark blue Mercedes-Benz CL 600 Coupé – among his colleagues, he was known as "Turbo-Rolf" for his fast driving. Although he denied being involved in the accident, the prosecutors office brought charges against him because of reliable observations from witnesses with car-related knowledge, who recognized noticeable parts of the test car like the headlights and exhaust pipes.

== Trial ==
Fischer was found guilty in two levels of jurisdiction for reckless driving and involuntary manslaughter. In addition to witness testimonies regarding his car, Fischer was found to have lied about his departure time at home, and a petrol station voucher showed that he could have been at the scene of the accident at the relevant time. His behaviour towards colleagues from work in the time after the accident had also raised suspicion in the company, that he could have been aware of the fact that he was in some way involved in the accident. The Local District Court in Karlsruhe sentenced Fischer to 18 months in prison without parole on 16 February 2004. His driving license had already been revoked when he became suspect of police investigations.

In an appeal procedure, the prison sentence was lowered to one year with parole, a €12,000 fine and revocation of the driving license for one year on 29 July 2004. The court based his decision on the fact that Fischer had already been punished by his loss of employment and the media attention through which he was known as the Todesraser ("Speeder of death").

== 2005 TV documentary ==
In July 2005, two years after the accident, the German public-service broadcaster ARD telecasted a documentary with the title Der Tag, als ich zum "Todes-Raser" wurde ("The day I became the Speeder of death"). It focuses on controversial and conflicting issues regarding the investigations and trial and concluded, that the guilt of Fischer might be disputable.
