= Outline of Germany =

Country in Western and Central Europe

The flag of Germany

The coat of arms of Germany

The location of Germany in Europe, with other members of the European Union being highlighted in green

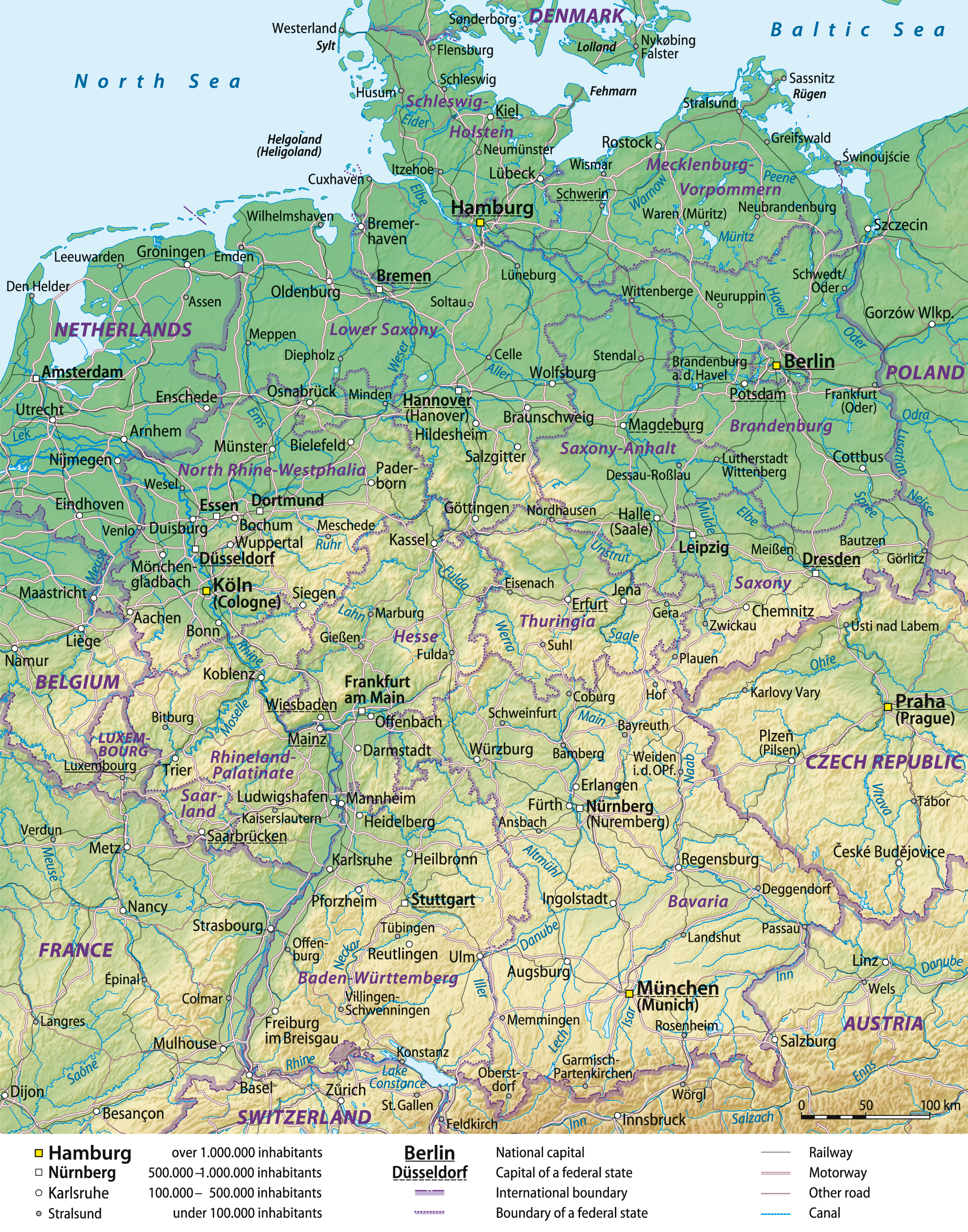
An enlargeable map of the Federal Republic of Germany

The following outline is provided as an overview of and topical guide to Germany:

Germany – federal parliamentary republic in Western-Central Europe consisting of 16 constituent states (German: Bundesland), which retain limited sovereignty. Its capital and largest city is Berlin. With more than 80 million inhabitants, it is the most populous member state of the European Union (EU). Germany is a major economic and political power of the European continent and a historic leader in many cultural, scientific, and technological fields.

After losing World War I, Germany fell under the control of Adolf Hitler, who started World War II. After losing World War II, Germany was divided into East Germany and West Germany, each on opposite sides during the Cold War. In October 1990, after the Cold War ended, the country was reunified under Christian Democratic Union (CDU) chancellor Helmut Kohl. As of December 2023, Germany has grown to become the world's third-largest economy by nominal GDP.

== General reference ==
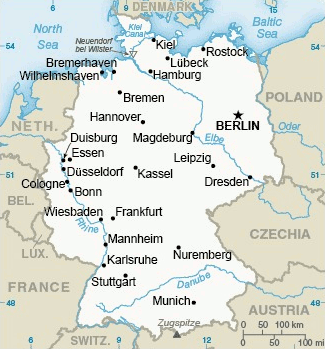
An enlargeable basic map of Germany

- Pronunciation: /ˈdʒɜːrməni/; German: Deutschland [ˈdɔʏtʃlant] (officially the Federal Republic of Germany; German: Bundesrepublik Deutschland [ˈbʊndəsʁepuˌbliːk ˈdɔʏtʃlant])
- Common English country name: Germany
- Official English country name: The Federal Republic of Germany
- Common endonym(s): Deutschland
- Official endonym(s): Bundesrepublik Deutschland
- Adjectival(s): German
- Demonym(s): Germans
- Etymology: Name of Germany
- International rankings of Germany
- ISO country codes: DE, DEU, 276
- ISO region codes: See ISO 3166-2:DE
- Internet country code top-level domain: .de

== Geography of Germany ==
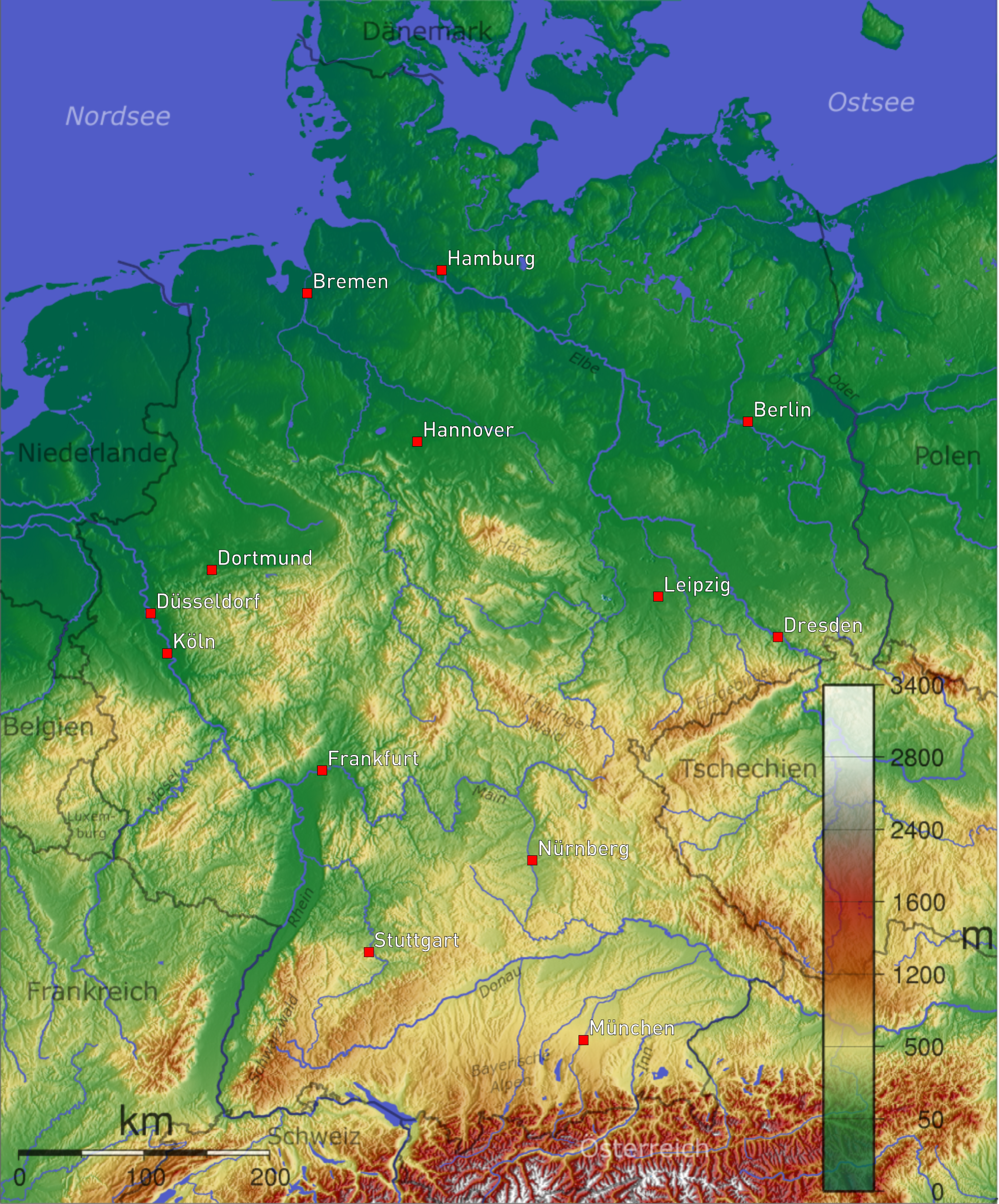
An enlargeable topographic map of Germany

Germany is bordered to the north by the North Sea, Denmark, and the Baltic Sea; to the east by Poland and the Czech Republic; to the south by Austria and Switzerland; and to the west by France, Luxembourg, Belgium, and the Netherlands. The territory of Germany covers 357,021 square kilometres (137,847 sq mi) and is influenced by a temperate seasonal climate.

- Germany is a:
  - Country
    - Developed country
  - Sovereign state
    - Member State of the European Union
    - Member state of NATO
- Location:
  - Northern Hemisphere and Eastern Hemisphere
    - Eurasia
      - Europe
        - Central Europe
        - Western Europe
  - Time in Germany
    - Time zones:
      - Central European Time (UTC+01), Central European Summer Time (UTC+02)
  - Extreme points of Germany (major towns):
    - North: Westerland (on the island of Sylt at the Danish border)
    - South: Oberstdorf, town at Austria
    - East: Goerlitz, town at Poland
    - West: Aachen, town at Belgium & the Netherlands
    - High: Zugspitze 2,962 m (9,718 ft)
    - Low: Neuendorf bei Wilster −3.5 m (−11 ft)

- Coastline: 2,389 km (1,484 mi)

- Population of Germany: 82,217,800 people (2007 estimate) – 14th most populous country
- Area of Germany: 357,021 km^{2} (137,847 sq mi) – 63rd largest country
- Atlas of Germany
- List of cities and towns in Germany
  - Metropolitan regions in Germany
  - Regiopolis

=== Neighbours of Germany ===
Land boundaries: 3,621 km (2,250 mi)

Austria 784 km (487 mi)
Czech Republic 646 km (401 mi)
Netherlands 577 km (359 mi)
Poland 456 km (283 mi)
France 451 km (280 mi)
Switzerland 334 km (208 mi)
Belgium 167 km (104 mi)
Luxembourg 138 km (86 mi)
Denmark 68 km (42 mi)

=== Environment of Germany ===
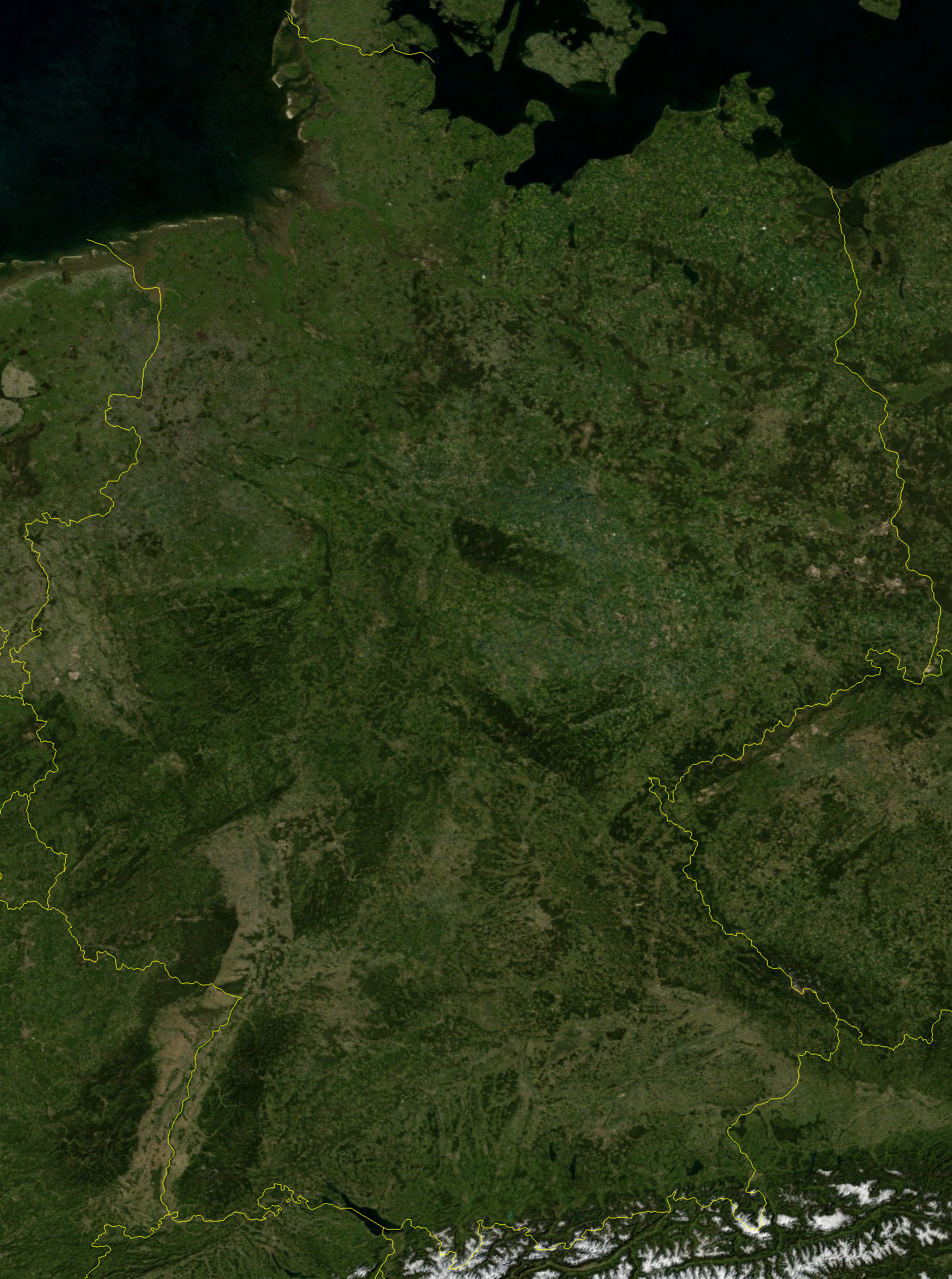
An enlargeable satellite image of Germany

- Climate of Germany
- Green building in Germany
- Renewable energy in Germany
- Geology of Germany
- National parks of Germany
- Protected areas of Germany
- Wildlife of Germany
  - Fauna of Germany
    - Fish of Germany
    - Birds of Germany
    - Mammals of Germany
    - Zoos in Germany

==== Geographic features of Germany ====
- Glaciers of Germany
- Islands of Germany
- Lakes of Germany
- Mountains of Germany
  - Volcanoes in Germany
- Rivers of Germany
  - Waterfalls of Germany
- Valleys of Germany
- World Heritage Sites in Germany

=== Administrative divisions of Germany ===

==== States of Germany ====
Germany is composed of 16 constituent states, called Bundesländer (plural form; Bundesland singularly; see map on the right).

===== Further subdivisions =====
- Some German states are subdivided into administrative regions, called Regierungsbezirke.
- Germany as a whole is further composed of approx. 400 districts, separated into:
  - "Rural" districts (Landkreise or Kreise) and
  - "Urban" districts (Kreisfreie Städte or Stadtkreise)
- Cities of Germany
- Municipalities of Germany

=== Demography of Germany ===
Demographics of Germany With over 82 million inhabitants, it comprises the largest population among the member states of the European Union and is home to the third-highest number of international migrants. See more at Immigration to Germany.

== Government and politics of Germany ==
- Form of government: federal parliamentary representative democratic republic
- Capital of Germany: Berlin
- Former Capital of West Germany and later seat of government of the reunified Federal Republic: Bonn
- Federal budget of Germany
- Elections in Germany
  - Electoral reform in Germany
  - Electoral system of Germany
- Far-right politics in Germany
- Federalism in Germany
- Political parties in Germany
- Political scandals of Germany
- Security issues in Germany
- Taxation in Germany
  - Feed-in tariffs in Germany

=== Branches of the government of Germany ===
Government of Germany

==== Executive branch of the government of Germany ====
- Head of state: President of Germany
- Head of government: Chancellor of Germany
- Cabinet of Germany

==== Legislative branch of the government of Germany ====
- Parliament of Germany (bicameral)
  - Upper house: Bundesrat of Germany
  - Lower house: Bundestag

==== Judicial branch of the government of Germany ====
Judiciary of Germany

- Federal Constitutional Court
- Joint Senate of the Supreme Courts of the Federation
- Federal Administrative Court
- Federal Court of Justice
- Federal Fiscal Court
- Federal Labour Court
- Federal Social Court
- Federal Patent Court

=== Foreign relations of Germany ===
Foreign relations of Germany

- List of diplomatic missions in Germany
- List of diplomatic missions of Germany
  - Embassy of Germany, Abuja
  - Embassy of Germany, Bangkok
  - Embassy of Germany, Brasília
  - Embassy of Germany, Budapest
  - Embassy of Germany, Canberra
  - Embassy of Germany, Chișinău
  - Embassy of Germany, Kyiv
  - Embassy of Germany, London
  - Embassy of Germany, Moscow
  - Embassy of Germany, Ottawa
  - Embassy of Germany, Prague
  - Embassy of Germany, Saint Petersburg
  - Embassy of Germany, Tel Aviv
  - Embassy of Germany, Washington, D.C.
  - Embassy of Germany, Wellington

==== International organization membership ====
The Federal Republic of Germany is a member of:

- African Development Bank Group (AfDB) (nonregional member)
- Arctic Council (observer)
- Asian Development Bank (ADB) (nonregional member)
- Australia Group
- Bank for International Settlements (BIS)
- Black Sea Economic Cooperation Zone (BSEC) (observer)
- Caribbean Development Bank (CDB)
- Central American Integration System (SICA) (observer)
- Confederation of European Paper Industries (CEPI)
- Council of Europe (CE)
- Council of the Baltic Sea States (CBSS)
- Economic and Monetary Union (EMU)
- Euro-Atlantic Partnership Council (EAPC)
- European Bank for Reconstruction and Development (EBRD)
- European Investment Bank (EIB)
- European Organization for Nuclear Research (CERN)
- European Space Agency (ESA)
- European Union (EU)
- Food and Agriculture Organization (FAO)
- Group of Six (G6)
- Group of Seven (G7)
- Group of Eight (G8)
- Group of Ten (G10)
- Group of Twenty Finance Ministers and Central Bank Governors (G20)
- Inter-American Development Bank (IADB)
- International Atomic Energy Agency (IAEA)
- International Bank for Reconstruction and Development (IBRD)
- International Chamber of Commerce (ICC)
- International Civil Aviation Organization (ICAO)
- International Criminal Court (ICCt)
- International Criminal Police Organization (Interpol)
- International Development Association (IDA)
- International Energy Agency (IEA)
- International Federation of Red Cross and Red Crescent Societies (IFRCS)
- International Finance Corporation (IFC)
- International Fund for Agricultural Development (IFAD)
- International Hydrographic Organization (IHO)
- International Labour Organization (ILO)
- International Maritime Organization (IMO)
- International Mobile Satellite Organization (IMSO)
- International Monetary Fund (IMF)
- International Olympic Committee (IOC)
- International Organization for Migration (IOM)
- International Organization for Standardization (ISO)
- International Red Cross and Red Crescent Movement (ICRM)
- International Telecommunication Union (ITU)
- International Telecommunications Satellite Organization (ITSO)
- International Trade Union Confederation (ITUC)
- Inter-Parliamentary Union (IPU)
- Multilateral Investment Guarantee Agency (MIGA)
- Nonaligned Movement (NAM) (guest)
- North Atlantic Treaty Organization (NATO)
- Nuclear Energy Agency (NEA)
- Nuclear Suppliers Group (NSG)
- Organisation for Economic Co-operation and Development (OECD)
- Organization for Security and Cooperation in Europe (OSCE)
- Organisation for the Prohibition of Chemical Weapons (OPCW)
- Organization of American States (OAS) (observer)
- Paris Club
- Permanent Court of Arbitration (PCA)
- Schengen Convention
- Southeast European Cooperative Initiative (SECI) (observer)
- United Nations (UN)
- United Nations Conference on Trade and Development (UNCTAD)
- United Nations Educational, Scientific, and Cultural Organization (UNESCO)
- United Nations High Commissioner for Refugees (UNHCR)
- United Nations Industrial Development Organization (UNIDO)
- United Nations Interim Force in Lebanon (UNIFIL)
- United Nations Mission in Liberia (UNMIL)
- United Nations Mission in the Sudan (UNMIS)
- United Nations Observer Mission in Georgia (UNOMIG)
- United Nations Relief and Works Agency for Palestine Refugees in the Near East (UNRWA)
- Universal Postal Union (UPU)
- West African Development Bank (WADB) (nonregional)
- Western European Union (WEU)
- World Customs Organization (WCO)
- World Federation of Trade Unions (WFTU)
- World Health Organization (WHO)
- World Intellectual Property Organization (WIPO)
- World Meteorological Organization (WMO)
- World Tourism Organization (UNWTO)
- World Trade Organization (WTO)
- World Veterans Federation
- Zangger Committee (ZC)

=== Law and order in Germany ===
Law of Germany

- Laws in Germany
  - Referendums in Germany
  - Alcohol laws in Germany
  - Capital punishment in Germany
  - Censorship in Germany
    - Censorship in the Federal Republic of Germany
  - Civil procedure code of Germany
  - Conscription in Germany
  - Constitution of Germany
    - Constitutional review in Germany
  - Copyright law of Germany
  - Driving licence in Germany
- Crime in Germany
  - Human trafficking in Germany
  - Rape in Germany
- Human rights in Germany
  - LGBT rights in Germany
    - Same-sex marriage in Germany
  - Freedom of religion in Germany
- Law enforcement in Germany
  - National law enforcement agencies
    - Federal Criminal Police Office (Germany)
    - Federal Police (Germany)
    - German Federal Coast Guard
    - GSG 9
  - Regional law enforcement agencies
    - Landespolizei – are operated by individual German states and are responsible for the bulk of police work in Germany
      - Baden-Württemberg Police
      - Bavarian State Police
      - Hesse State Police
      - North Rhine-Westphalia Police
      - Rheinland-Pfalz State Police
      - Saarland Police
    - Landespolizei forces are divided into the following operational sections:
        - Schutzpolizei – ('Schupo') The uniformed police officers who patrol the streets, respond to emergency calls, do traffic policing etc.
        - Kriminalpolizei – ('Kripo') The plain clothes detective branch of the State police, responsible for investigations. For instance, if a car is broken into, the Schupo will respond, secure the car, notify the owner etc., and then hand the case over to Kripo for investigation.
        - Einsatzhundertschaften (EHU) / Bereitschaftspolizei (BePo) – Uniformed part of the LaPo that is used when manpower is required, for example during political demonstrations.
        - Landeskriminalamt (LKA) – The State Investigation Bureau is directly subordinate to the state ministry of the interior, supervises police operations aimed at preventing and investigating criminal offences, and coordinates investigations involving more than one Präsidium.
        - Wasserschutzpolizei (WSP) – The river police for patrolling rivers, lakes and harbours.
        - Spezialeinsatzkommando (SEK) – The SWAT teams of the German state police.
        - Autobahnpolizei – The highway patrol or motorway police in Germany.

=== Military of Germany ===
Military of Germany

- Command
  - Commander-in-chief:
    - Ministry of Defence of Germany
- Bundeswehr
  - Army of Germany: Heer
  - Navy of Germany: Marine
  - Air force of Germany: Luftwaffe
  - Special forces of Germany: Kommando Spezialkräfte
- Military history of Germany
- Military ranks of Germany

=== Local government in Germany ===
Local government in Germany

== History of Germany ==
=== History of Germany, by period ===
- 18th-century history of Germany

==== Years in Germany ====
Years in Germany

1871 • 1872 • 1873 • 1874 • 1875 • 1876 • 1877 • 1878 • 1879 • 1880 • 1881 • 1882 • 1883 • 1884 • 1885 • 1886 • 1887 • 1888 • 1889 • 1890 • 1891 • 1892 • 1893 • 1894 • 1895 • 1896 • 1897 • 1898 • 1899 • 1900 • 1901 • 1902 • 1903 • 1904 • 1905 • 1906 • 1907 • 1908 • 1909 • 1911 • 1912 • 1913 • 1914 • 1915 • 1916 • 1917 • 1918 • 1919 • 1920 • 1921 • 1922 • 1923 • 1924 • 1925 • 1926 • 1927 • 1928 • 1929 • 1930 • 1931 • 1932 • 1933 • 1934 • 1935 • 1936 • 1937 • 1938 • 1939 • 1940 • 1941 • 1942 • 1943 • 1944 • 1945 • 1946 • 1947 • 1948 • 1949 • 1950 • 1951 • 1952 • 1953 • 1954 • 1955 • 1956 • 1957 • 1958 • 1959 • 1960 • 1961 • 1962 • 1963 • 1964 • 1965 • 1966 • 1967 • 1968 • 1969 • 1970 • 1971 • 1972 • 1973 • 1974 • 1975 • 1976 • 1977 • 1978 • 1979 • 1980 • 1981 • 1982 • 1983 • 1984 • 1985 • 1986 • 1987 • 1988 • 1989 • 1990 • 1991 • 1992 • 1993 • 1994 • 1995 • 1996 • 1997 • 1998 • 1999 • 2000 • 2001 • 2002 • 2003 • 2004 • 2005 • 2006 • 2007 • 2008 • 2009 • 2010 • 2011 • 2012 • 2013 • 2014 • 2015 • 2016 • 2017 • 2018 • 2019

=== History of Germany, by subject ===
- List of historic states of Germany
- List of historical political parties in Germany
- Military history of Germany

== Culture of Germany ==
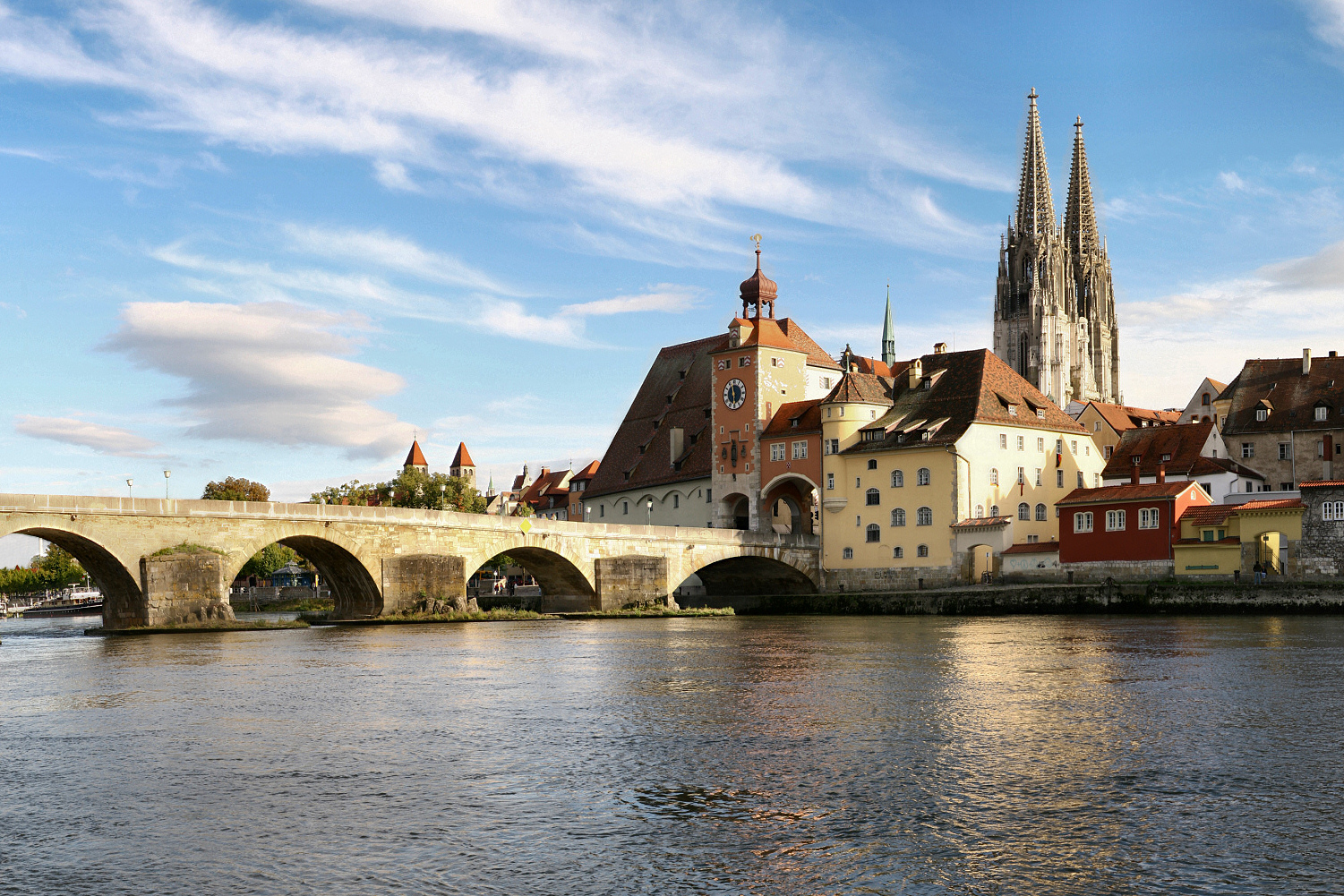
Old Town of Regensburg (UNESCO World Heritage Site)

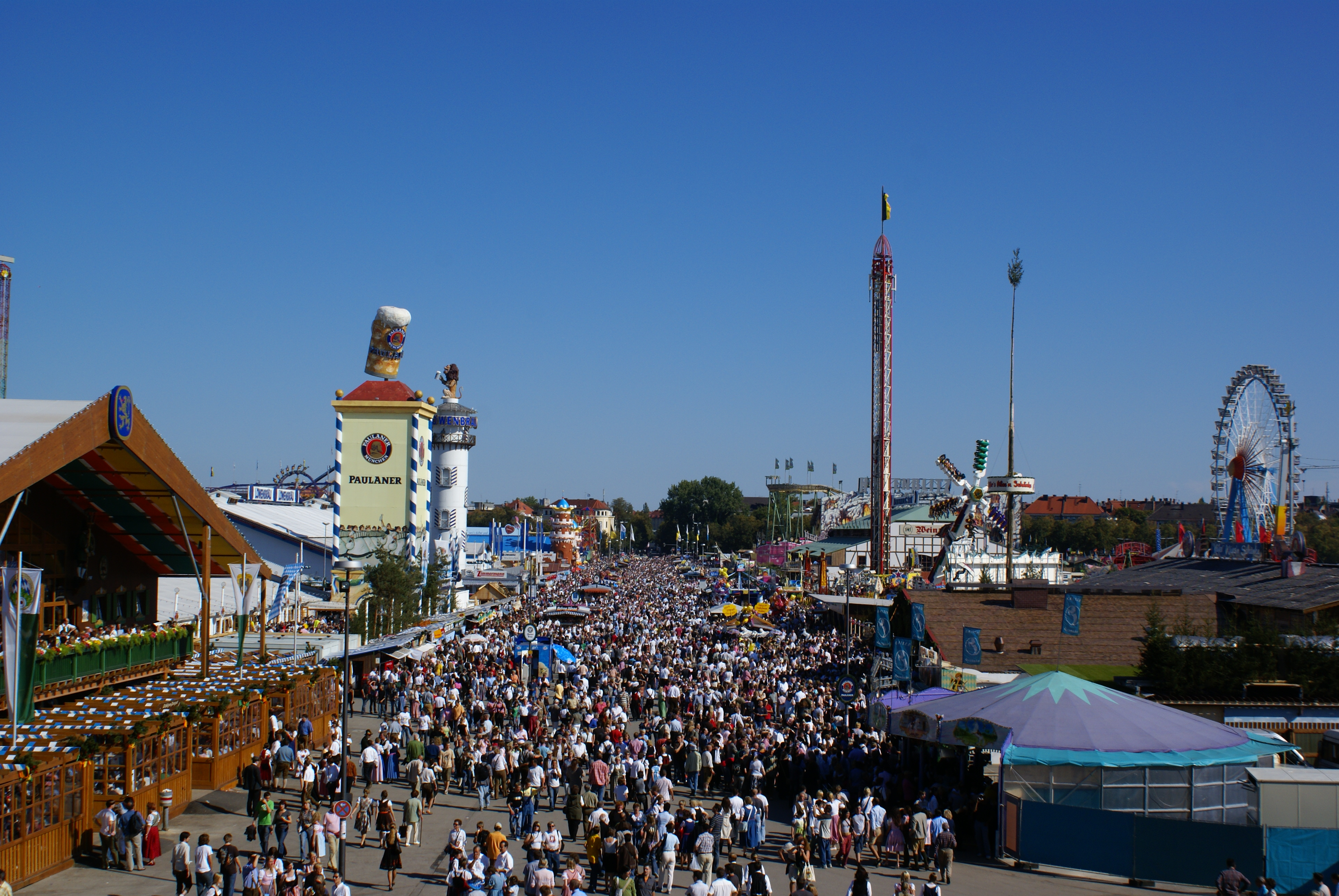
The Oktoberfest in Munich is the world's largest fair.

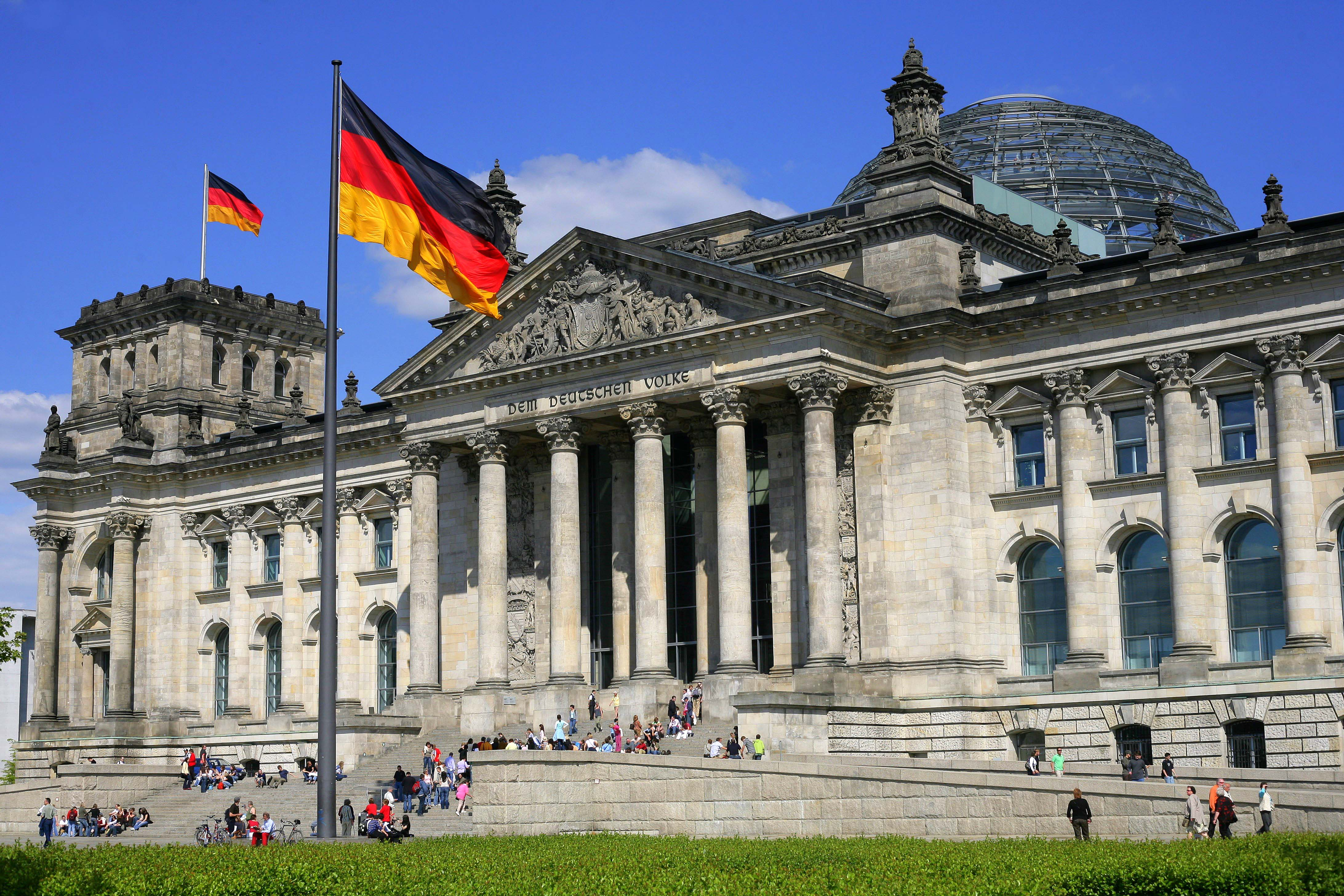
The German Unity Flag is a national symbol of German Reunification that was raised on 3 October 1990. It waves in front of the Bundestag in Berlin (seat of the German parliament).

Culture of Germany

- Architecture of Germany
  - Altstadt
  - World Heritage Sites in Germany
- Cuisine of Germany
  - Beer in Germany
- Cultural icons of Germany
- Festivals in Germany
- German humour
  - East German jokes
- Languages of Germany
- Media in Germany
  - Newspapers in Germany
  - Radio in Germany
  - Television in Germany
  - Video gaming in Germany
- Museums in Germany
- National symbols of Germany
  - Coat of arms of Germany
  - Flag of Germany
  - National anthem of Germany
- Philosophy in Germany
- Prostitution in Germany
- Public holidays in Germany
- Scouting and Guiding in Germany
- World Heritage Sites in Germany

=== Art in Germany ===
- Art in Germany
- Cinema of Germany
- Cuisine of Germany
- Fashion of Germany
- Literature of Germany
- Made in Germany

==== Music of Germany ====
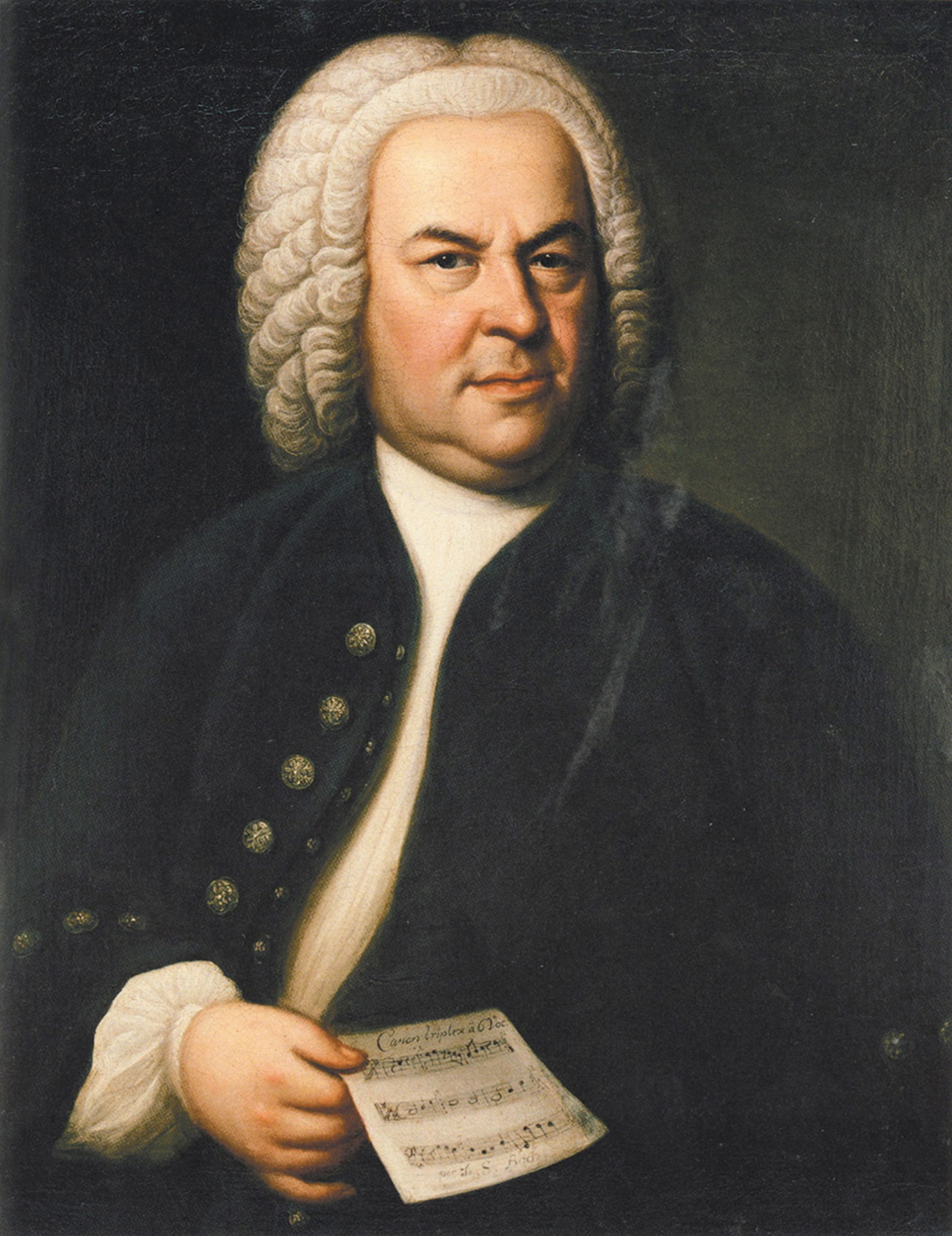
Johann Sebastian Bach

Music of Germany

- List of best-selling albums in Germany
- List of best-selling singles in Germany
- List of German composers
- Jazz in Germany

=== People of Germany ===
- Afghans in Germany
- Ahmadiyya in Germany
- Albanians in Germany
- Americans in Germany
- Arabs in Germany
- Armenians in Germany
- Asians in Germany
- Assyrians in Germany
- Azerbaijanis in Germany
- Brazilians in Germany
- Bulgarians in Germany
- Chinese people in Germany
- Croatians in Germany
- Filipinos in Germany
- Georgians in Germany
- Greeks in Germany
- Hungarians in Germany
- Indians in Germany
- Iranians in Germany
- Iraqis in Germany
- Islamic Community of Germany
- Italians in Germany
- Kurds in Germany
- Lebanese people in Germany
- List of Lebanese people in Germany
- Macedonians in Germany
- Russians in Germany
- Serbs in Germany
- Tjaskers in Germany
- Turks in Germany
- Ukrainians in Germany
- Vietnamese people in Germany
- Yazidis in Germany

=== Religion and belief systems in Germany ===
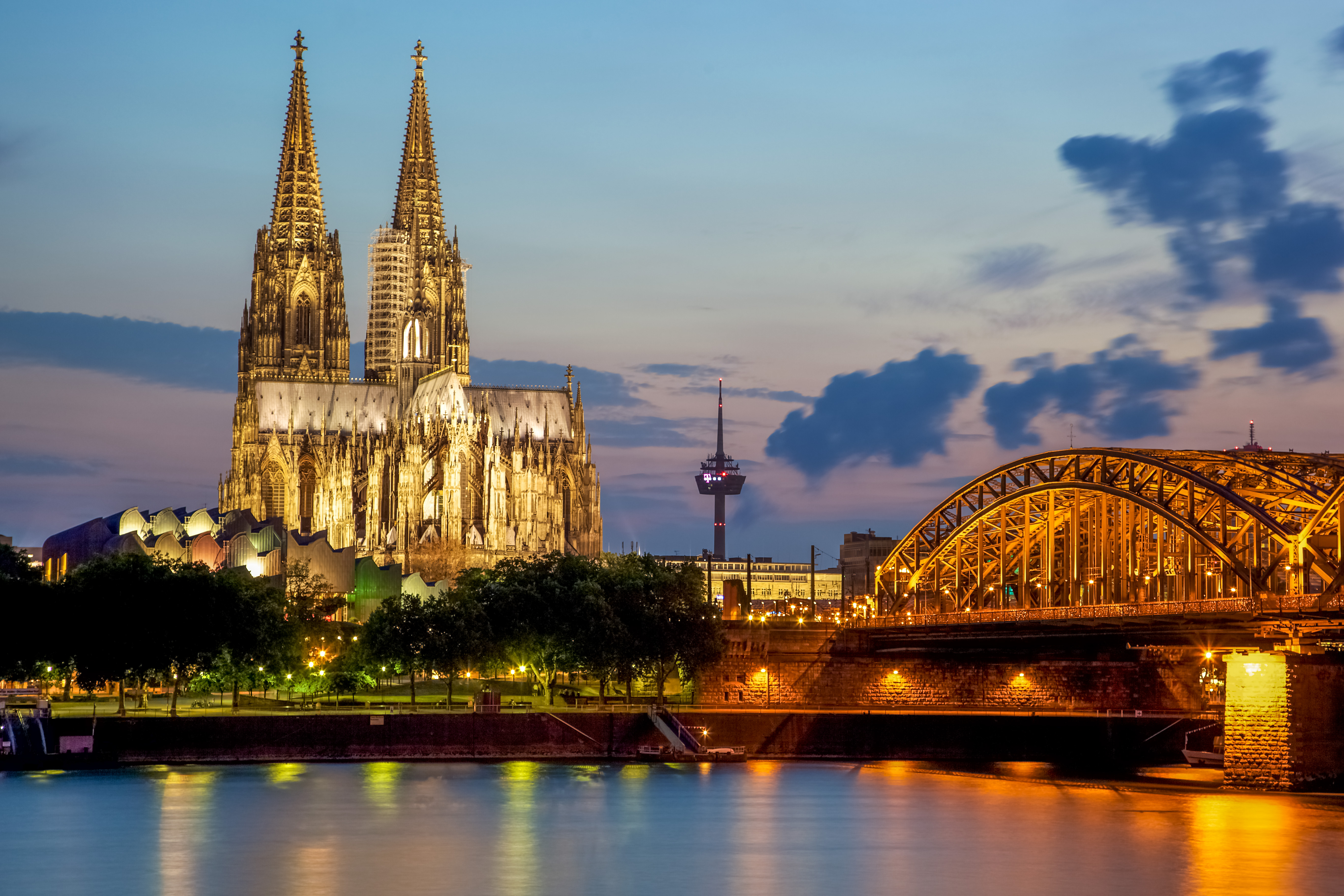
Cologne Cathedral

- Irreligion in Germany
- Religion in Germany
  - Freedom of religion in Germany
  - Religions in Germany
    - Buddhism in Germany
    - Christianity in Germany
      - Catholicism in Germany
      - Protestantism in Germany
        - Protestant Church in Germany
    - Hinduism in Germany
    - Islam in Germany
    - Judaism in Germany
      - History of the Jews in Germany
    - Sikhism in Germany
    - Scientology in Germany

=== Sports in Germany ===
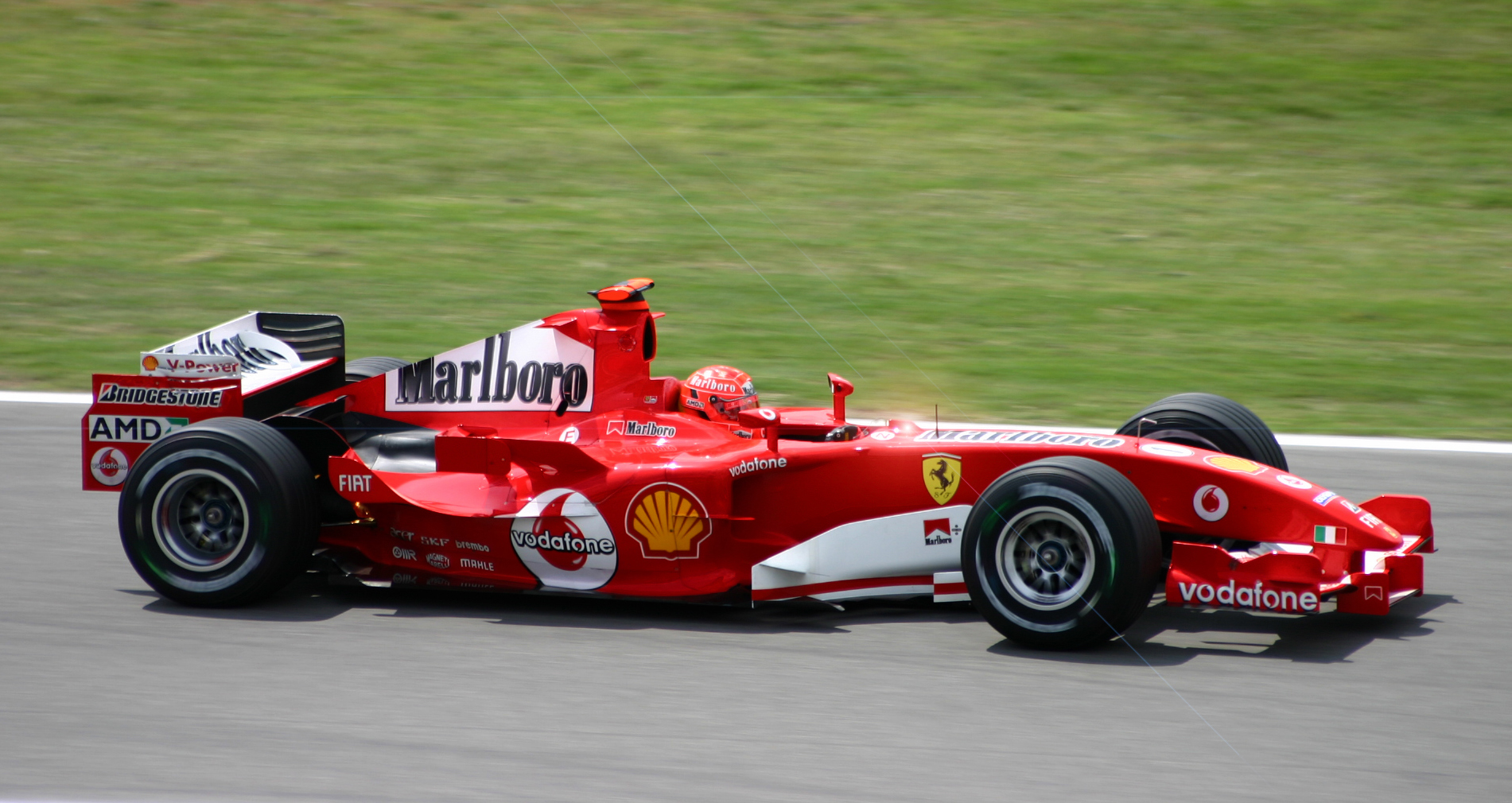
Michael Schumacher has claimed 91 race victories and 7 championships in his F1 career.

Sports in Germany

- American Football Association of Germany
- Athletics in Germany
- Auto racing in Germany
  - Speedway Grand Prix of Germany
    - 1995 Speedway Grand Prix of Germany
    - 1996 Speedway Grand Prix of Germany
    - 1997 Speedway Grand Prix of Germany
    - 1998 Speedway Grand Prix of Germany
    - 2001 Speedway Grand Prix of Germany
    - 2007 Speedway Grand Prix of Germany
    - 2008 Speedway Grand Prix of Germany
- Basketball in Germany
  - National basketball games of Germany
- Bodybuilding in Germany
- Cricket in Germany
- Football in Germany
  - Australian rules football in Germany
  - Football records in Germany
  - Footballer of the Year (Germany)
  - Foreign football players in Germany
  - List of American football teams in Germany
  - List of Germany Davis Cup team representatives
  - List of Germany men's international footballers
  - List of Germany international footballers 1908–1942
  - List of Germany women's international footballers
  - List of football clubs in Germany
  - List of football clubs in Germany by major honours won
  - List of football stadiums in Germany
  - Women's football in Germany
- Germany at the Olympics
- German records in athletics
- Ice hockey in Germany
- Roller derby in Germany
- Rugby in Germany
  - Rugby league in Germany
  - Rugby union in Germany
    - List of Germany national rugby union players
    - List of Germany national rugby union team results
    - List of rugby union clubs in Germany
- Sports broadcasting contracts in Germany

== Economy and infrastructure of Germany ==
Germany was the third largest exporter in 2017. In absolute terms, Germany allocates the second biggest annual budget of development aid in the world, while its military expenditure ranked sixth. The country has developed a high standard of living and established a comprehensive system of social security.

- Economic rank, by nominal GDP (2007): 4th (fourth)
- Agriculture in Germany
  - List of mills in Germany
- Central banks
  - Deutsche Bundesbank, Frankfurt
  - European Central Bank, Frankfurt
- Communications in Germany
  - Internet in Germany
  - Television in Germany
    - History of television in Germany
- Companies of Germany

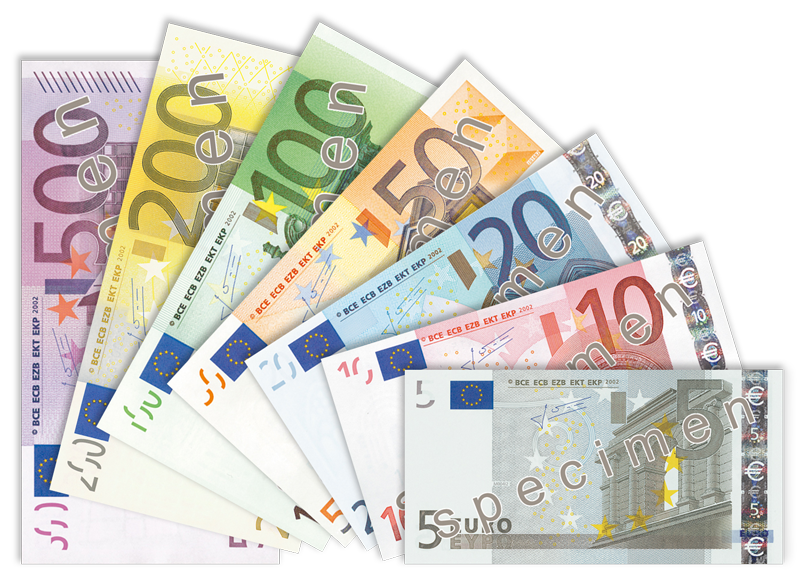
Euro banknotes

- Currency of Germany: Euro (see also: Euro topics)
  - ISO 4217: EUR
- Economic history of Germany
- Mining in Germany
  - List of mines in Germany
- Mittelstand
- Stock exchange: Frankfurt Stock Exchange
- Tourism in Germany
  - List of spa towns in Germany
- Transport in Germany
  - Airports in Germany
  - Road system of Germany
    - Road signs in Germany
    - Highway system of Germany
  - Rail transport in Germany
    - Rapid transit in Germany
    - High-speed rail in Germany
    - History of rail transport in Germany
- Water supply and sanitation in Germany
- Wirtschaftswunder

=== Energy in Germany ===
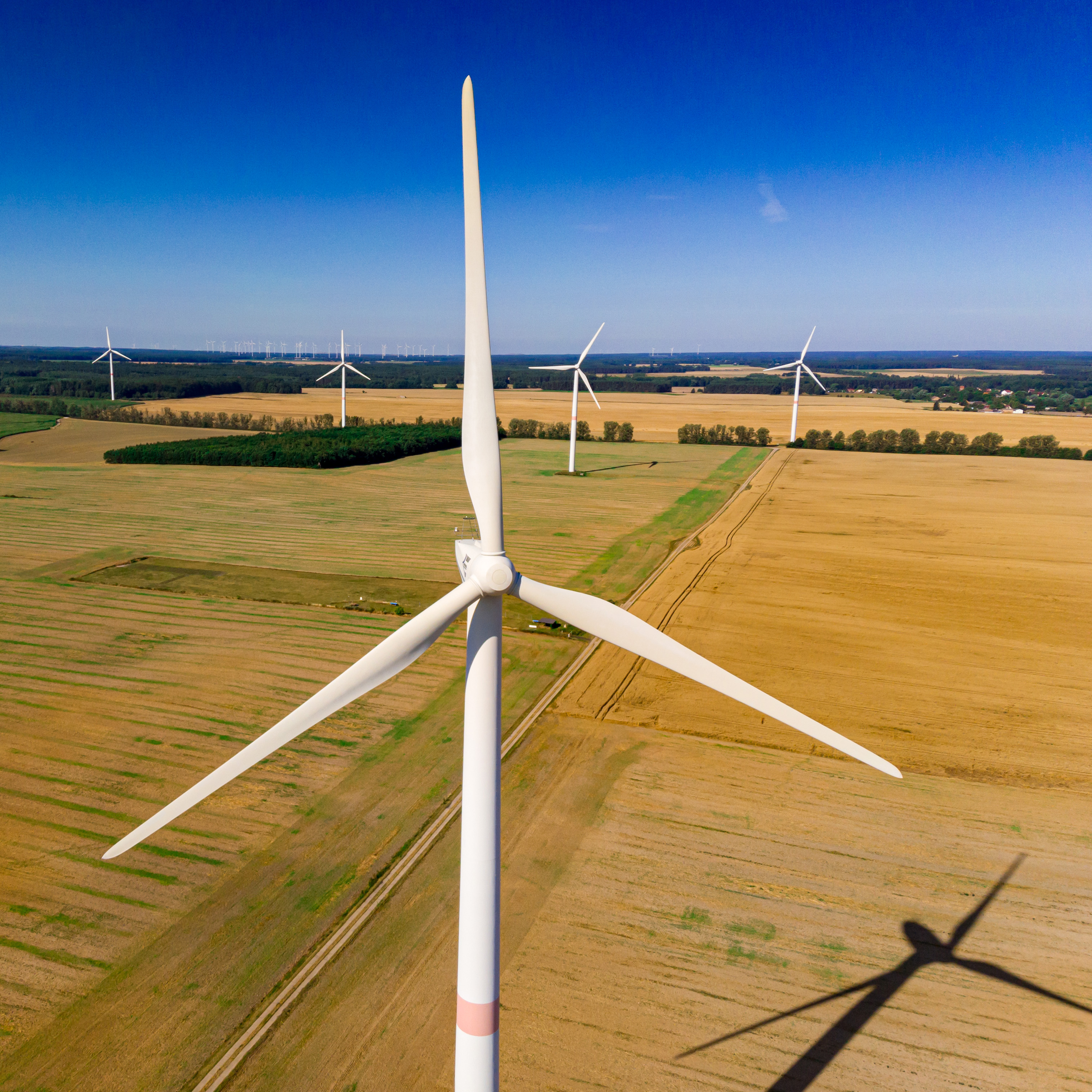
Wind turbine at Trampe (Breydin), wind farm Heckelberg-Brunow/Breydin

Windkraftanlage bei Breydin OT Trampe, Brandenburg;

Energy in Germany

- Electricity sector in Germany
- Geothermal power in Germany
- List of power stations in Germany
- Energy transition in Germany
- Nuclear power in Germany
- Solar power in Germany
- Wind power in Germany
  - List of windmills in Germany

== Education in Germany ==
Education in Germany

- Academic achievement among different groups in Germany
- Academic grading in Germany
- Academic ranks in Germany
- Science and technology in Germany
  - List of German inventors and discoverers
- Universities in Germany
- List of schools in Germany
- Music schools in Germany
- State libraries of Germany
- Student loans in Germany

== Health in Germany ==
Health in Germany

- Health care in Germany
  - Emergency medical services in Germany
  - Health care system of the elderly in Germany
  - Long-term care insurance in Germany
  - Nursing in Germany
- Obesity in Germany

== See also ==
- Index of Germany-related articles
- List of international rankings
- Member state of the European Union
- Member state of the Group of Twenty Finance Ministers and Central Bank Governors
- Member state of the North Atlantic Treaty Organization
- Member state of the United Nations
- Outline of Europe
- Outline of geography
