= Long-term care insurance in Germany =

«For humane care. Long-term care insurance now!» CDA's poster

In January 1995, the government of Helmut Kohl introduced the Social Law XI 1, the German long term care insurance. It is an independent part of the social security in Germany, in the Sozialgesetzbuch and provides financial provision for the risk of care necessity. Long-term care insurance was introduced as the fifth pillar of social insurance after health insurance, industrial injuries, pensions and unemployment insurance. This fifth pillar is financed by the care fund, which was built for all the individual health insurance policies.

Insurance is also provided for people who need care because of the severity of their long-term care. Old and sick people are no longer dependent on social security if in need of care. Statutory care insurance covers a portion of the home and residential care costs if an increased need for nursing or household assistance of at least six months is required. This will help the patient to lead an independent and self-determined life.

== The insured person ==
Both compulsory and voluntarily insured individuals in the statutory health insurance system are automatically covered by the social long-term care insurance. Voluntarily insured individuals, along with those who are fully privately insured, have the option to take out private long-term care insurance instead. Family members can also be covered under a regular member’s insurance through contribution-free family coverage. With this system, a cover for the entire population was introduced.

== The benefit ==
=== The levels of care ===
The care need people receive the benefits of insurance cover in three stages. The stages are referred to as levels of care and serve the classification of the claims of each care dependent person. The decision for the classification in the care insurance is made with substantial consideration of the nursing report. It is created by the medical service of health insurance, in which the insured is examined in his living area. The levels of care are organized as follows:

- Care level I: a need for assistance for at least 90 min per day with basic care needs of at least 45 min per day.
- Care level II: a need for assistance must be at least 180 min per day with basic care needs of at least 120 min per day.
- Care level III: a need for assistance is required for at least 300 min per day with basic care needs of at least 240 min per day.
- Case of hardship: the care fund can provide more services in line with care benefits and inpatient care.

If there is need of personal care below the required threshold of at least 90 min per day, there are no benefits. All services except for technical aids and care courses are budgeted. This is to prevent that the care insurance from being converted into full insurance. Thus, the contributions will be kept stable and the development expenditure can be controlled.

=== The home care ===
Like the levels of care, the services are categorized as well. On the one side there is the home care and on the other side there is the inpatient care. The home care can be divided into four categories:

The first group is the so-called care allowance, a monthly cash benefit for private organized caregivers, such as family members who are currently not employed. The cash amount in €235 in category I, €440 in category II and €700 in category III. In this scheme, there is no case of hardship arrangement.

The second option is the care benefit in kind. The ambulatory care service for the home care is subsidized, which is selected by the patient. These benefit have a maximum amount per month. In care level, I the amount is €450; in care level II, €1100; and in level III, €1,550. In special hardship cases, the care fund can cover operations with a total value of up to €1,918.

In addition, the combination of the care fund and care benefits is possible. In this case, the care benefits of the nursing for the home care can be charged as material costs. As well, the present share of the maximum amount can be claimed as cash benefit for caregivers.

Partial inpatient care is a temporary support during the day in an institution. The benefits are identical to those of the care in kind.

=== Inpatient care ===
Inpatient care includes an accommodation in a home. This means that services are provided for the duration of care. The need for inpatient care is assumed. The care fund pays a fee to the nursing home. In care level I, the amount is €1023; in level II, €1,279; and in level III, €1,432. In extreme cases, up to €1,688 can be paid. The cash benefits are only for the cost of care and social support determined the home. If the income from all the family members required to pay maintenance is not sufficient to pay the remaining costs of the inpatient care, the appropriate social assistance institution can be requested.

== Financing ==
With the introduction of the care insurance, the risk of nursing care case got recognition as a general life risk. This is a budgeting system. This means that depending on the level of care people get a fixed amount that is paid by the insurance as support, regardless of how high the prices for such services, such as by inflation, should rise over the years. The amount of the fee is based on the contribution rate and the assessable income of the members. For the publicly insured people, the contribution rate is 1.7%.

However, childless people who are 23 years or older have to pay a rate of 1.95%. This is paid from the gross amount of wages or pensions but only up to a maximum amount for health insurance from the current €4,012.50 per month. This regulation applies equally to all citizens of Germany since 1. July 1996. Family members are in a non-contributory insurance if the family coverage is eligible for the health insurance. However, the receipt of benefits from the long-term care does not absolve from payment of contributions.

== The gaps in the care insurance ==
The care insurance is very complex so that few citizens have the necessary information to apply for the claim properly. Evaluators of the medical service test whether a person is entitled to have care. The patients are not prepared for the report. This creates a false impression of fitness and subsequently an incorrect (less comprehensive) classification of those people. This leads to the problem that the family and patient cannot cope with the situation financially.

In cases where patients or their families feel a claim was wrongly denied or classified, they can turn to the Insurance Ombudsman (Versicherungsombudsmann), an independent and free arbitration board that helps resolve disputes between consumers and insurance providers without going to court.

There are many ways to care for family members or to give assistance: the home emergency, the short-term and day care, the assisted living, the help for housekeeping, the meals being delivered to the house, the driving and escort services, and the nursing homes. This is only a small overview of the diversity of these opportunities. Because this issue is so complex, patients often do not receive assistance and private insurance for nursing care.

Furthermore, important factors in determining the time required for care are not taken into account in general. The emerging care reform includes the care of people suffering from dementia and need to get permanent presence from a person. In contrast, there is neither support in social areas of life nor help to manage crises and isolation nor dealing with dying and death. Equally nursing care cases of shorter duration than half a year get no payments from the original insurance.

In principle, the legislature requires the combination of two conditions in the case of entitlement to benefit. On one hand, patients need to have assistance both in the nursing part and in the household. On the other hand, outside assistance is needed regularly and permanently. If any of these conditions is not met, there is no payment. The regular need for assistance means that care is needed at least once a week. Durable means that the need for care exists longer than six months. "The actual duration is not important, but the prognosis, the prospects for the future“.

Also, people needing care must meet formal requirements. The patients must be insured in the statutory or private health insurance as well as they have to be in the care insurance with contributions or non-contributory and apply for nursing care. To apply for this the concerned person must have a prior insurance of about five years in a care fund.

Meanwhile, the shortage of nurses has become an important topic as well. Nearly one in five employees in nursing would like to leave the profession because of excessive working hours. Mostly, this concerns younger and better qualified nursing staff. The time pressure that is put on professional nurses in difficult care situations usually affects the quality of care for people on need.

== The membership rate ==
Twelve years after its introduction, long-term care was reformed for the first time in 2008. The Act provides, inter alia, a broadening of services. The care reform provides various changes. The membership rate for the long term care was raised on 1 July 2008 by 0.25% so the care rate rose from 1.7% to 1.95%. For people without children, already at least 23, the nursing care rate rise up to 2.2% of the gross salary. The higher care premiums should be sufficient to 2014. After that, the maintenance care rates should adjusted for price increases every 3 years.

== Promotion of home care ==
For elderly care centres, there should be more possible alternatives. Firstly, it is planned to include someone like a care advisor who identifies the need for assistance, creates individual care plans and supervise the implementation. Secondly, a support for supervised living arrangements and bases for care close to home. These residential communities have the chance to order a jointly nursing support. Home care bases are established when a country decides. In addition care funds can close contracts more easily, not only with nursing services but also with individual nurses contracts. Inpatient facilities, however, co-operate more easily with doctors or they can hire their own doctors.

== Performance increases ==
The care reform also increased gradually care benefit services in kind by 2012. In care level I, the amount rose from €384 to €450; in care level II, from €921 to €1,100; and in care level III, from €1,432 to €1,550.

The stationary amounts changed only in care level III. Here, the performance gradually increased from €1,432 to €1,550 in 2012. In extreme cases, the performance was from €1,688 to €1,918.

For people with dementia, Alzheimer's or mental disabilities, performances should be extended. They get them if they are not yet in care level I. Here they went from €460 to €2400. On 1 July 2008, a basic amount and an increased amount were introduced. The basic amount can be up to €1,200 per year and is intended for those with a comparatively lower overall support costs. The referred amount of up to €2,400 is intended for people with higher overall support costs in relation to care needs. These amounts are paid in addition to proper care. People with dementia receiving better care in nursing homes. For these people, additional support staff is deployed, financed by the care funds. Further services amounting to €200 million will be spent.

Care services in elderly care centres were compensated additionally. Furthermore, the claim of the short-term care was also raised gradually in care level III and in cases of hardship. Short-term care for children needing help from institutions for the disabled expanded. Benefits for day and night care were improved, higher subsidies were offered, and performances got index-linked. Also, the insurance period has been shortened to two years. In addition, care funds had a shortened review period so they must provide results within five weeks to the submitted application. For a hospital stay, the review period has to occur by the medical service of health insurance within a week.

Pension entitlement is increased for the benefit of the caretaker. These people are paid in the future during their leisure as contributions to statutory pension insurance.

In the future, patients are entitled to a comprehensive care advice so for the insured person an individual counseling, support and guidance, which is tailored to the individual needs.

== The right to unpaid leave ==
The care reform is a claim for unpaid but socially insured exemption. As already stated, this means for the members that the opportunity should be offered to receive six months unpaid leave from her work with the right to return to work for employees in companies with more than 15 employees. In addition, employees are entitled to temporary, unpaid leave of up to 10 working days given to organize the care of a relative, who needs unexpectedly nursing care. During this period the worker is insured again.

== The quality improvement of the homes ==
To ensure expanding quality assurance in nursing homes, they were rewarded with a one-time bonus of €1536 if a caretaker reaches a better care level due to good care. To prevent abuse, the more favorable classification has to remain at least six months. It also specifies that the health care insurance pays a settlement amount of €3,072 if the rehabilitation can be provided in time. Thus, transition from hospital care to rehabilitation and maintenance work should be seamless. To insure the quality of institutions, expert standards bodies should be established.

Before testing once a year, all institutions are inspected previously. These tests are generally unannounced. The insured will be able to get a better estimation on the basis of published reports for the individual institutions.

== Care and supplemental training for volunteers ==
To support the population, health insurances are allowed to communicate private care insurances.

The care reform provides for the support of citizens who dedicate themselves in their free time to care. They will be promoted, for example, with the acquisition of training costs. They can participate in support groups or day care.

== See also ==
- Health in Germany
