= Obesity in Germany =

Share of adults that are obese, 1975 to 2016

Obesity in Germany has been increasingly cited as a major health issue in recent years. The federal government has declared this to be a major issue.

Data released by the World Health Organization in 2014 showed that while an issue of growing concern, within the European Union, Germany had an incidence of overweight and obese adults as a percentage of the total population at 54.8% as in comparison with France at 60.7%, Spain at 60.9% or the United Kingdom at 63.4%.

== History ==
=== Prior to 2007 ===
In 1998, 19 percent of men and 22.5 percent of women met the definition of obesity. Childhood obesity doubled between 1985 and 1999. Childhood obesity is at about 1.9 million children in Germany; of which 800.000 are considered truly obese.

=== 2007 – 2010 ===
Chart showing that Germany had the most overweight and obese people among Europeans in 2007

A 2007 study shows Germany had the highest number of overweight people in Europe. However, the United Kingdom, Greece and certain countries in Eastern Europe have a higher rate of "truly obese" people. In 2007, The German obesity rate was considered at the same level as with the American obesity rate. In Germany, 60% of men and 43% of women are considered overweight while in France, 38.5% of men and 26% of women are considered overweight. Germans are considered thinner than people in the United Kingdom. The waist of female Germans between the ages of 14 and 70 grew by 4.1 centimetres between 1994 and 2009. The belly girth of men between 16 and 70 grew by 4.4 centimetres between 1980 and 2009.

=== 2011 – Present ===
The number of overweight people in Germany has stagnated between 1998 and December 2011. 67.1% of all men between 18 and 79 are considered overweight with a BMI of 25 or greater. In 2019, the proportion of overweight and obese people in Germany was at an average level for the EU-27.

=== Childhood obesity ===
Italy has surpassed Germany for having the fattest children in Europe. A survey in 2007 had Germany listed as the country with "the highest proportion of overweight children in Europe." However, despite dropping in the rankings, the number of truly obese children have doubled in the past decade.

Around 4% of 5 to 7 year-olds and 8% of 10 to 14 year-olds are obese in Germany.

== Healthful lifestyle ==
Only 14% live a "completely healthful" life. Almost a quarter of German adults meet the definition of obesity. Both men and women are around 23%.

=== State-by-state ===
Mecklenburg-Vorpommern go on foot or by bicycle to get where they need to more often than any other state. Mecklenburg-Vorpommern has the most people living a "completely healthy" life at a rate of 19.8% of the people while Saxony-Anhalt have the fewest people living a "completely healthy" life. Thuringia has the healthiest eating habits while people from North Rhine-Westphalia and Berlin have the worst eating habits.

==== Statistics of people living a "completely healthy" life ====
Ranking	State	Percentage of people living a "completely healthy" life	Source
1	Mecklenburg-Vorpommern	19.8	
2	Lower Saxony & Bremen	19.5	
3	Saxony	17.2	
4	Bavaria	16.5	
5	Hesse	14.7	
6	Thuringia	13.9	
7	Schleswig-Holstein	13.6	
8	Berlin	12.3	
9	North Rhine-Westphalia	12.0	
9	Hamburg	12.0	
11	Baden-Württemberg	11.3	
12	Rhineland-Palatinate & Saarland	9.4	
12	Brandenburg	9.4	
14	Saxony-Anhalt	7.9	

== Causes ==
=== Food and drinks ===
A high consumption of beer, fatty and processed foods and a lack of exercise are to be blamed for obesity in Germany.

Another issue is the lack of fruits, vegetables and fish in the German diet. Children's food products do not contribute to a healthy diet.

Die Welt reported that a "balanced diet is practically impossible." The profit margin for fruits and vegetables was below five percent while confectionery, soft drinks and snacks was at 15% or more.

=== Genes ===
Genes partly play a role in obesity. Scientists at the German Institute of Human Nutrition and the University Hospital of Leipzig stated that identified two genes that promote fat accumulation in the abdominal cavity. The increased activity of the genes also promotes the release of an enzyme that is responsible for the formation of cortisol. A permanent increase in cortisol levels contribute to obesity.

=== Marriage ===
Marriage has played a factor. 69% of married men are considered overweight while only 43% of single men are considered overweight. 58% of widowed women are considered overweight and 46% of married women are considered overweight, while only 25% of single women are considered overweight. For children, lifestyle choices such as exercise and enough sleep plays a role in weight.

== Effects ==
=== Employment problems ===
A study by the German Sport University Cologne revealed that some industries in Germany have a shortage of qualified trainees due to Germany's obesity epidemic. The industries affected are security and emergency services and skilled manual work sectors.

=== Clothing industry ===
A clothing-related study revealed that many clothing companies plan to adjust their sizing partly due to Germany's obesity epidemic.

=== Physical health ===
Several studies have shown that obese men tend to have a lower sperm count, fewer rapidly mobile sperm and fewer progressively motile sperm compared to normal-weight men.

Obesity in Germany has created a cholesterol problem. High cholesterol is known to cause premature death, angina, heart disease and strokes.

Diabetics are at higher risk for complications such as heart attack and stroke. In Germany, 600,000 people suffered from diabetes near the end of World War II compared to eight million now.

Obesity can increase risk for secondary diseases such as diabetes, cardiovascular disease, certain cancers and Alzheimer's. Children who get diabetes can expect to lose 10 to 15 years off of their lives. Diabetes also affect the eyes, kidneys and nerves in the legs.

Obesity is a "very strong promoter of cancer." Obesity causes an increased risk for colon cancer and breast cancer.

=== Costs ===
Health costs because of obesity has increased and accounts for 20% of health costs. A third of patients suffer from a loss of control when eating and how much out of control depends on how fat the patient is.

=== Intelligence ===
Obesity in seniors shows that it makes seniors less intelligent.

== Programs ==
There are many weight loss children programs for kids.

=== Fit instead of Fat ===
The Fit instead of Fat program is run by the German federal government. The objective of the program is to "sharply" reduce obesity rates by the year 2020. The program will try and meet the target by improving the quality of food offered in schools and hospitals along with increasing exercise levels in children.

=== Bundeswehr's fitness camp ===
As of 2007, forty percent of the Bundeswehr's 300,000 conscripts doing military service are considered overweight. A 2007 report declared "excessive bureaucracy" for limiting the time soldiers have to exercise. As a result, an anti-obesity fitness camp opened in Warendorf, North Rhine-Westphalia.

=== Projekt Kugelblitz ===
A hospital in Leverkusen, North Rhine-Westphalia started Projekt Kugelblitz to help obese children and adolescence. The aim of the program is to "improve the self-perception, so that the participants develop more sensitive to the context of frustration and compulsive eating, and the selection and preparation of foods and of exercise and well-being".

=== Anti-obesity clinic ===
An anti-obesity clinic in Wesseling, North Rhine-Westphalia works with a maximum of eight participants for 27 months. The program is about nutrition counseling, physical exercise and behavior therapy. Each week they are cared for in highly structured and interlinked courses and motivated. Up to 80 appointments are intended per year.

=== School involvement and funding ===
North Rhine-Westphalia introduced fitness test for students in the second grade due to an increase of children and adolescents being overweight. The students will be weighed and be put through a series of eight exercises. The state government also wants to fund sports for children who have a weight problem.

== Forbes 2007 ranking ==
The following list reflects the percentage of overweight adults aged 15 and over. These are individuals who have individual body mass indexes, which measures weight relative to height, greater than or equal to 25.

Ranking	Country	Percentage
38	Jordan	60.5
39	Bahamas	60.4
40	Iceland	60.4
41	Nicaragua	60.4
42	Cuba	60.1
43	Germany	60.1
44	Brunei Darussalam	59.8
45	Slovenia	59.8
46	Peru	59.6
47	Vanuatu	59.6
48	Finland	58.7

== See also ==
- Health in Germany
- Epidemiology of obesity
- List of countries by Body Mass Index (BMI)
