= Capital of Germany =

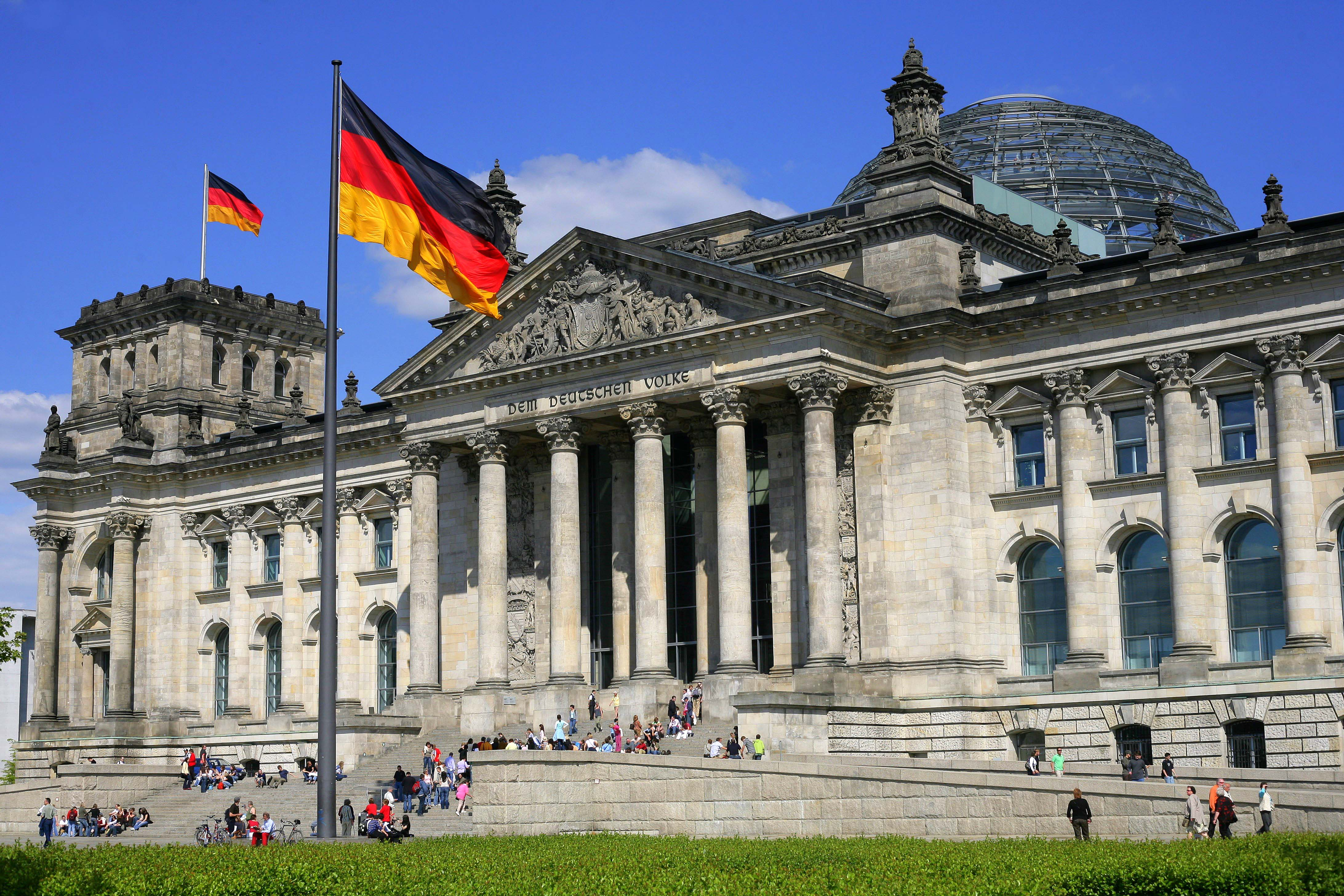
The Reichstag building in Berlin is the site of the German parliament.

The capital of Germany is the city of Berlin. It is the seat of the Federal President of Germany, whose official residence is Bellevue Castle. The Federal Council is the representation of the Lands of Germany and has its seat at the former Prussian House of Lords. Though most of the ministries are seated in Berlin, some of them, as well as some minor departments, are seated in Bonn, the former capital of West Germany. Although Berlin is officially the capital of Germany, 8,000 out of the 18,000 total officials employed at the federal bureaucracy still work in Bonn, about 600 km (370 mi) away from Berlin.

== History ==
=== Pre-1871 ===
Prior to 1871, Germany was not a unified nation-state, and had no capital city. The medieval German Holy Roman Empire used to have Aachen as its preferred seat of government during Charlemagne's reign, and until 1531 it was the place where 31 Holy Roman Emperors were crowned Kings of the Germans. The coronation later moved to Frankfurt. However, after Charlemagne, none of the subsequent Holy Roman Emperors moved to Aachen or Frankfurt, instead retaining their own original constituent kingdom or principality as base or moving into temporary Royal palaces dotted around the confederate realm known as Kaiserpfalz. The last imperial ruling house (the Habsburgs) had Vienna as its permanent seat of government.

After the Congress of Vienna created the formal German Confederation in 1815, a Federal Assembly convened at the Free City of Frankfurt, representing not the people of the individual German Lands but their sovereigns. Subsequently, Frankfurt briefly became the official German capital during the short-lived Revolutions of 1848 in the German states.

=== 1871–1945 ===
It was only during the 1871 unification of Germany that the newly unified German Reich was first assigned an official capital. Since Berlin was the capital of Prussia, the leading state of the new Reich, it became the capital of Germany as well. Berlin had been the capital of Prussia and its predecessor, Brandenburg (an der Havel), since 1518. Berlin remained the capital of the German Reich until 1945. However, for a period of a few months following the First World War, the national assembly met in Weimar because civil war was ravaging Berlin. After the capture of Berlin in 1945, Flensburg briefly served as capital. Germany was then occupied by the Allies as the outcome of World War II, and Berlin ceased to be the capital of a sovereign German state.

=== 1945–1990 ===
Map showing the division of Germany until 3 October 1990: • western Germany (blue) • East Germany (red) • Berlin (yellow)

In 1949, with sovereignty regained the country split up into Germany (western) and East Germany. Berlin was also divided, into West Berlin and East Berlin. Originally, Frankfurt was to be the provisional capital of western Germany. However, the authorities of state intended to make Berlin the capital if Germany were ever reunified. They feared that since Frankfurt was a major city in its own right, it would ultimately be accepted as a permanent capital and weaken western German support for reunification. For this reason, the capital was located in the smaller university city of Bonn as a more obviously provisional solution. Another factor was that Bonn is close to Cologne, the hometown of Germany's first Federal Chancellor, Konrad Adenauer.

East Germany claimed all of Berlin as its capital, although the city as a whole was still legally occupied territory and would remain so for 41 years. In reality, the Soviet occupation sector of Berlin, East Berlin served as the East German capital. The United States, United Kingdom, and France did not recognize East Berlin as the capital of East Germany even after establishing diplomatic relations with East Germany in 1973 and 1974, though they set up embassies in East Berlin.

=== Since 1990 ===
In 1990, with the reunification of Germany, Berlin was also reunified and became the capital of the enlarged Germany. There was some debate, however, on whether the seat of government should move to Berlin. Many believed that Bonn should remain the seat of government – a situation analogous to that of the Netherlands, where Amsterdam is the capital but The Hague is the seat of government. In 1991, after an emotional debate, the Bundestag voted to move the seat of government to Berlin by 1999. However, six ministries remained in Bonn, each with a second office in Berlin. The German constitution was amended in 2006 to explicitly state that Berlin is the capital of Germany.

== See also ==
- Decision on the Capital of Germany
