= Football records and statistics in Germany =

Statistical Breakdown of German football

For association football in Germany, this page details football records in Germany.

== National team ==
=== Appearances ===
- Most appearances: 150, Lothar Matthäus
- Youngest player: Willy Baumgärtner, 17 years, 104 days, 5 April 1908, 3–5 v Switzerland
- Oldest player: Lothar Matthäus, 39 years, 91 days, 20 June 2000, 0–3 v Portugal
- Oldest debutant: Karl Sesta, 35 years, 83 days, 15 June 1941, 5–1 v Croatia

=== Goals ===
- First goal: Fritz Becker, 5 April 1908, 3–5 v Switzerland
- Most goals: 71, Miroslav Klose
- Most goals in a match: 10, Gottfried Fuchs (v Russia, 1912 Summer Olympics)
- Youngest goalscorer: Marius Hiller, 17 years, 241 days, 3 April 1910, 3–2 v Switzerland

== Men's Honours ==
=== Major competitions ===
FIFA World Cup

- Champions (4): 1954, 1974, 1990, 2014
- Runners-up (4): 1966, 1982, 1986, 2002
- Third place (4): 1934, 1970, 2006, 2010
- Fourth place (1): 1958

UEFA European Championship

- Champions (3): 1972, 1980, 1996
- Runners-up (3): 1976, 1992, 2008
- Third place (3): 1988, 2012, 2016

Summer Olympic Games

- Gold Medal (1): 1976
- Silver Medal (2): 1980, 2016
- Bronze Medal (3): 1964, 1972, 1988
- Fourth place (1): 1952

FIFA Confederations Cup

- Champions (1): 2017
- Third place (1): 2005

Overview
Event	1st place	2nd place	3rd place	4th place
FIFA World Cup	4	4	4	1
UEFA European Championship	3	3	3	x
Summer Olympic Games	1	2	3	1
FIFA Confederations Cup	1	0	1	0
UEFA Nations League	0	0	0	0
Total	9	9	11	2

== Women's Honours ==
=== Major competitions ===
FIFA Women's World Cup

- Champions (2): 2003, 2007
- Runners-up (1): 1995
- Fourth place (2): 1991, 2015

UEFA Women's Championship

- Champions (8): 1989, 1991, 1995, 1997, 2001, 2005, 2009, 2013
- Runners-up (1): 2022
- Fourth place (1): 1993

Summer Olympic Games

- Gold Medal (1): 2016
- Bronze Medal (3): 2000, 2004, 2008

Overview
Event	1st place	2nd place	3rd place	4th place
FIFA Women's World Cup	2	1	0	2
UEFA Women's Championship	8	1	0	1
Summer Olympic Games	1	0	3	0
Total	11	2	3	3

== League ==
=== Titles ===
- Most championships won: 33, Bayern Munich
- Most consecutive championships: 11
  - Bayern Munich (2013–2023)
- Most East German championships: 10, Dynamo Berlin
- Most consecutive East German championships: 10, Dynamo Berlin (1979–1988)

=== Attendances ===
- Record attendance: 100,000, SC Rotation Leipzig v SC Lokomotive Leipzig at Zentralstadion (September 1956)

== Individual records ==
=== Appearances ===
- Most Bundesliga appearances: 602, Charly Körbel

=== Goals ===
- Most career league goals: Erwin Helmchen
- Most career domestic top-flight goals: 404, Uwe Seeler
- Most Bundesliga goals: 365, Gerd Müller
- Most Bundesliga goals in one season: 41, Robert Lewandowski (2020–21)

== Most successful clubs overall (1902–present) ==
=== Key ===
German domestic competitions organised by the DFB, and the DFL
1ª	Bundesliga, former German football championship (1902–1963)
CUP	DFB-Pokal
LCUP	DFL-Ligapokal (Defunct)
SCUP	DFL-Supercup, former DFB-Supercup
European continental competitions organised by UEFA
UCL	UEFA Champions League, former European Champion Clubs' Cup
UCWC	UEFA Cup Winners' Cup (Defunct)
UEL	UEFA Europa League, former UEFA Cup
USC	UEFA Super Cup
UIC	UEFA Intertoto Cup (Defunct)
Intercontinental competitions organised by FIFA, and by UEFA and CONMEBOL
FCWC	FIFA Club World Cup
IC	Intercontinental Cup (Defunct)

=== Performance by club ===
(Sorted by overall titles. Use sorting button to change criteria.)

Last updated on 23 August 2026, following Bayern Munich winning the 2026 SCUP.

Team	Domestic titles					European titles						Worldwide titles			All titles
Team	1ª	CUP	LCUP	SCUP	Total	UCL	UCWC	UEL	USC	UIC	Total	FCWC	IC	Total	Total
Bayern Munich	**35**	**21**	**6**	**12**	**74**	**6**	**1**	1	**2**		**10**	**2**	**2**	**4**	**88**
Borussia Dortmund	8	5		6	19	1	**1**				2		1	1	22
Schalke 04	7	5	1	1	14			1		**2**	3				17
Werder Bremen	4	6	1	3	14		**1**			1	2				16
Hamburger SV	6	3	2		11	1	**1**			**2**	4				15
1. FC Nürnberg	9	4			13										13
VfB Stuttgart	5	4		1	10					**2**	2				12
Borussia Mönchengladbach	5	3			8			**2**			2				10
Eintracht Frankfurt	1	5			6			**2**			2				8
1. FC Kaiserslautern	4	2		1	7										7
1. FC Köln	3	4			7										7
Bayer Leverkusen	1	2		1	4			1			1				5
Lokomotive Leipzig	3	1			4										4
Dresdner SC	2	2			4										4
Hertha Berlin	2		2		4										4
Karlsruher SC	1	2			3					1	1				4
Greuther Fürth	3				3										3
Hannover 96	2	1			3										3
1860 München	1	2			3										3
Fortuna Düsseldorf	1	2			3										3
VfL Wolfsburg	1	1		1	3										3
RB Leipzig		2	1		3										3
Viktoria Berlin	2				2										2
Rapid Wien	1	1			2										2
Rot-Weiß Essen	1	1			2										2
Blau-Weiß Berlin	1				1										1
Eintracht Braunschweig	1				1										1
Freiburger FC	1				1										1
Holstein Kiel	1				1										1
Karlsruher FV	1				1										1
VfR Mannheim	1				1										1
First Vienna FC		1			1										1
KFC Uerdingen		1			1										1
Kickers Offenbach		1			1										1
Schwarz-Weiß Essen		1			1										1
1. FC Magdeburg							**1**				1				1

The figures in bold represent the most times this competition has been won by a German team.
