= International rankings of Germany =

These are the international rankings of Germany.

Sources are listed in the respective articles.

== International rankings ==
Organization	Survey	Ranking
Institute for Economics and Peace	Global Peace Index, 2025	20 out of 163
United Nations Development Programme	Human Development Index, 2016	4 out of 188
Transparency International	Corruption Perceptions Index, 2024	15 out of 180
Economist Intelligence Unit	Democracy Index, 2024	13 out of 167
World Economic Forum	Global Competitiveness Report, 2019	7 out of 141
Reporters without Borders	Press Freedom Index, 2025	11 out of 180
World Intellectual Property Organization	Global Innovation Index, 2026	11 out of 139
