= Foreign football players in Germany =

There are many foreign football players in the German professional football leagues. As of November 2009, there are 249 foreign players in the Bundesliga, resulting in a foreigner ratio of 45%. In the 2. Bundesliga, there are 145 foreign players – a ratio of 31%. In the 3. Liga, the foreigner ratio is 15%.

== Rulings ==
For the 2006–07 season, the limits on foreign (non-EU) players were lifted, based on a decision of the German Football Association (DFB) and Deutsche Fußball Liga made on 21 December 2005. At the same time, the UEFA local player ruling was introduced. This ruling stipulates, that a certain number of locally produced players must be enrolled at each club. For the 2006–07 season, this was at least four such players, for the 2007–08 season six players and for the 2008–09 season eight such players.

A locally produced player is a player who, during the age of 15–21 years, was licensed to play for the club for three different seasons or years.

== Ratio of foreign players ==
Data from season 2009–10.

Liga	Players	Ratio
1. Bundesliga	249	45%
2. Bundesliga	145	31%
3. Bundesliga		15%

== Countries ==
With 42 players, Brazil is the country with the most nationals playing in the German professional football leagues. Thirty of them played for clubs in the highest level in 2009–10. Only four clubs in the 1. Bundesliga were totally without Brazilian players: VfL Bochum, SC Freiburg, 1. FSV Mainz 05 and 1. FC Nürnberg. Below the highest league level, the number of Brazilians drops rapidly: ten Brazilians play in the 2. Bundesliga, and only two in the 3. Liga. In recent years, the Turks have been 43 players.

The following table lists the nationality of players in the three professional football leagues of Germany.

=== Americas ===
Country	Players
Brazil	42
Canada	8
USA	7
Trinidad and Tobago	1
Venezuela	2
Colombia	3
Ecuador	2
Peru	5
Bolivia	1
Chile	1
Paraguay	2
Uruguay	2
Argentina	8
Mexico	1

=== Europe ===
Country	Players
Belgium	9
Hungary	9
Bulgaria	6
Romania	6
Serbia	6
Slovakia	6
Slovenia	6
Macedonia	4
Montenegro	4
Lithuania	2
Bosnia	19
Czech Republic	19
Croatia	18
Austria	17
Netherlands	14
Switzerland	14
Denmark	10
Poland	10
Finland	7
Sweden	4
Scotland	1
Ireland	1
France	19
Spain	4
Italy	12
Portugal	4
Greece	9
Turkey	43
Georgia	6
Ukraine	3
Belarus	1
Russia	1

=== Africa ===
Country	Players
Tunisia	6
Algeria	4
Morocco	4
Mali	1
Burkina Faso	5
Senegal	1
Gambia	2
Liberia	2
Ivory Coast	5
Togo	1
Ghana	8
Nigeria	7
Cameroon	9
Congo DR	4
Angola	1
Sambia	2
Namibia	1
South Africa	2
Egypt	2
Seychelles	1

=== Middle East ===
Country	Players
Israel	2
Iran	2
Lebanon	5

=== Asia and Oceania ===
Country	Players
China	1
South Korea	5
Japan	4
Australia	3
Philippines	1

== See also ==
- List of foreign Bundesliga players
- List of foreign 2. Bundesliga players
