= Fauna of Germany =

Native animals of Germany

Approximately 48,000 animal species inhabit the forests, meadows, and mountains of Germany. A significant portion of these are insects; however, the region also supports 328 bird species, 104 distinct mammals, and numerous amphibians and reptiles. Germany boasts an abundance of national parks and nature reserves dedicated to safeguarding animal habitats. There are approximately 10,300 plant species and 14,400 fungi species found in Germany.

The red fox has become a vital component of Berlin's urban landscape, wandering through parks, backyards, and even the streets at night. Consequently, the German Wildlife Foundation provides guided tours for children in Berlin through its Nature Learning Workshop.

In the urban meadows and parks, local wildlife is observed, and one is likely to encounter a brown hare. Millions of these hares thrive in the countryside. Additionally, the chances of spotting a lynx in Germany have increased: approximately 140 lynx inhabit 10 of the 16 federal states in Germany, along with their young.

Furthermore, over 1,000 wild cats reside in the Eifel National Park nature reserve near Cologne. This area hosts one of the most significant populations of this predator in Central Europe, where wildcats coexist with red deer and even beavers across a span of 110 square kilometers.

== Gallery ==
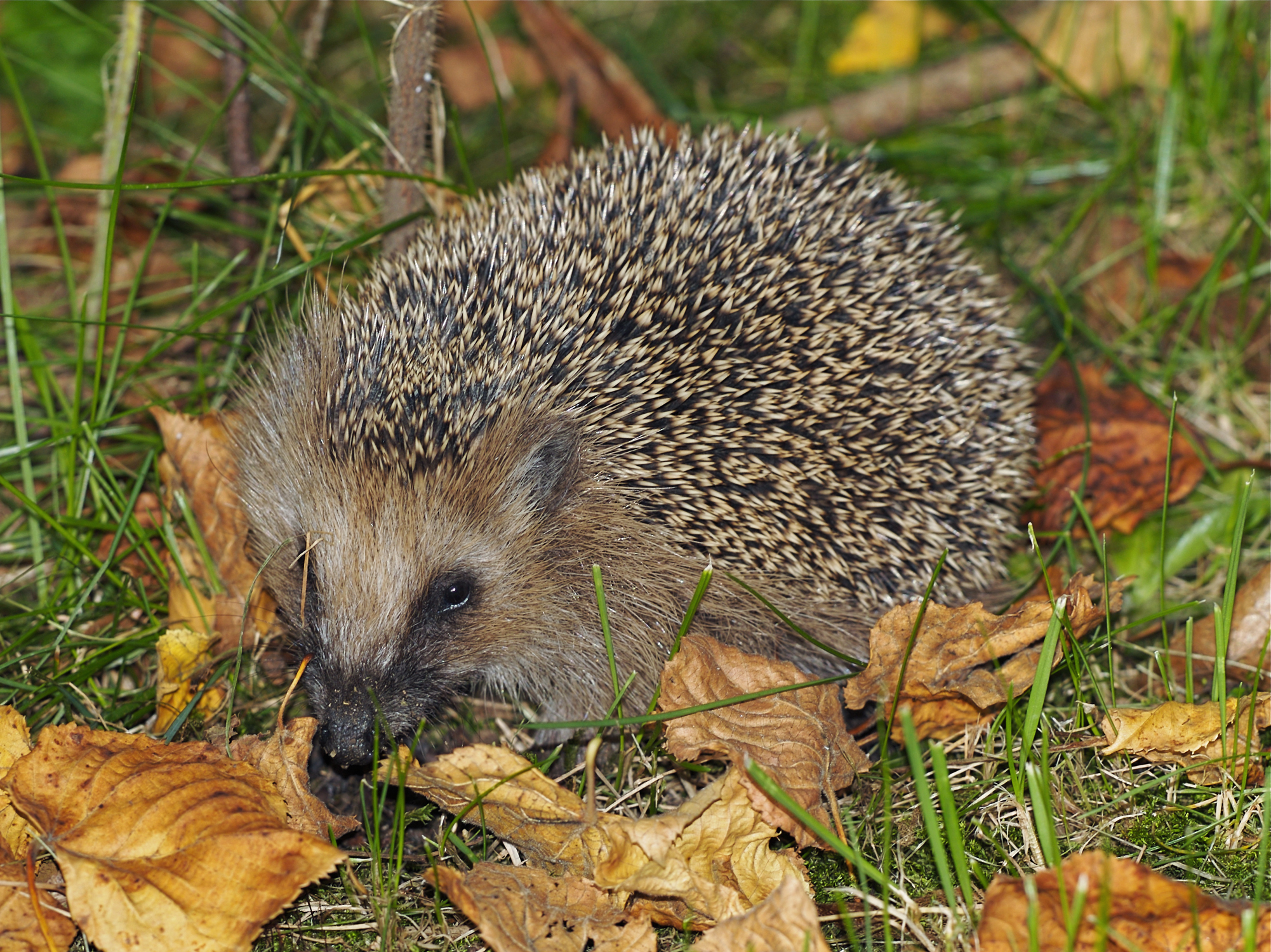

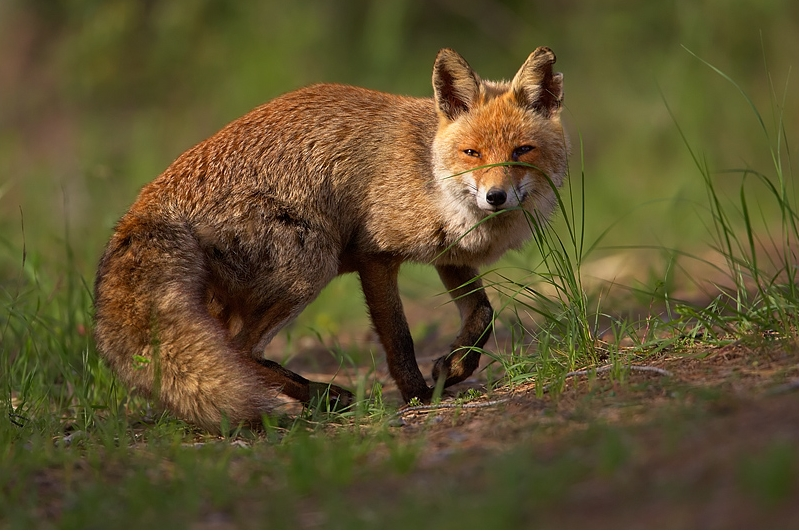

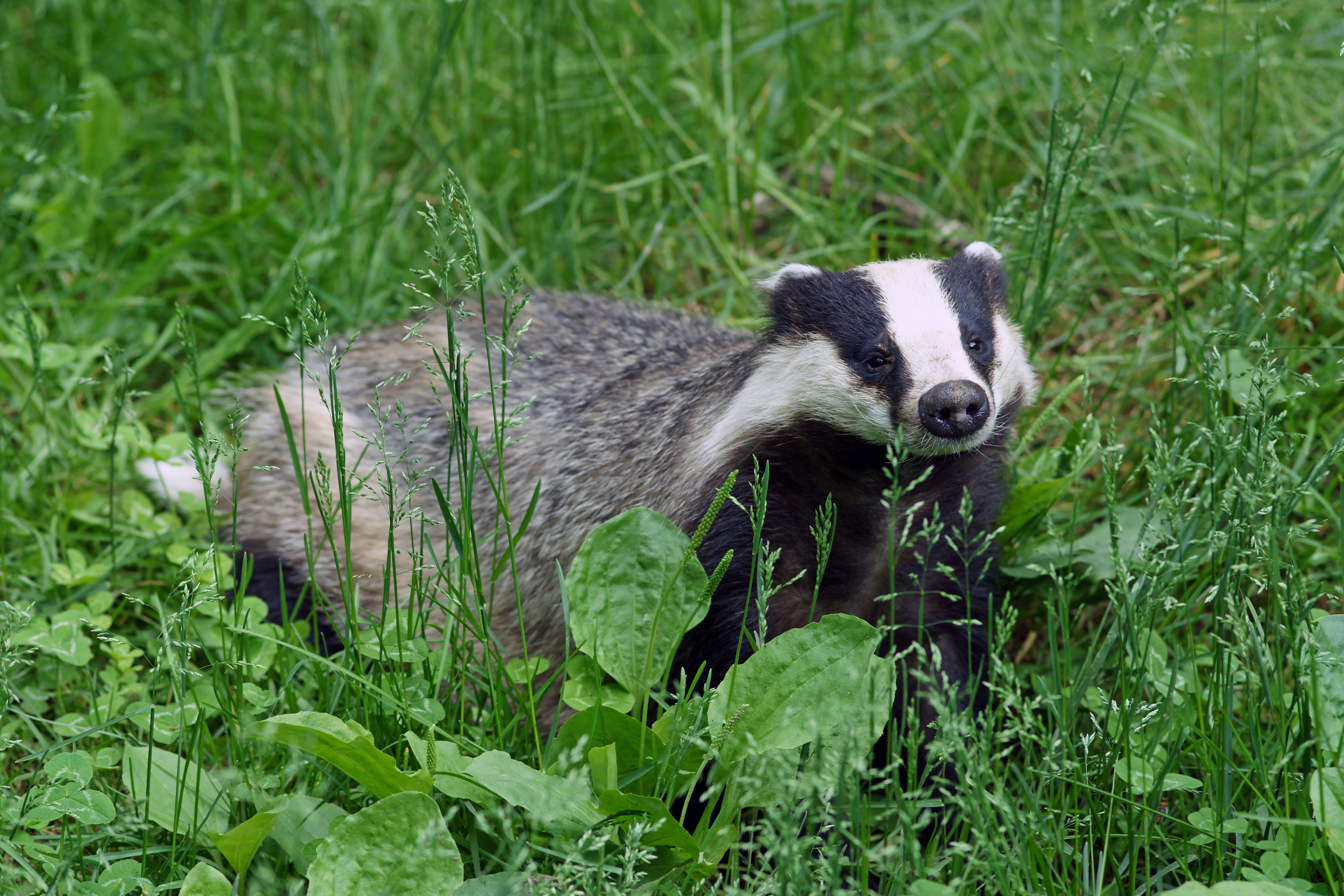

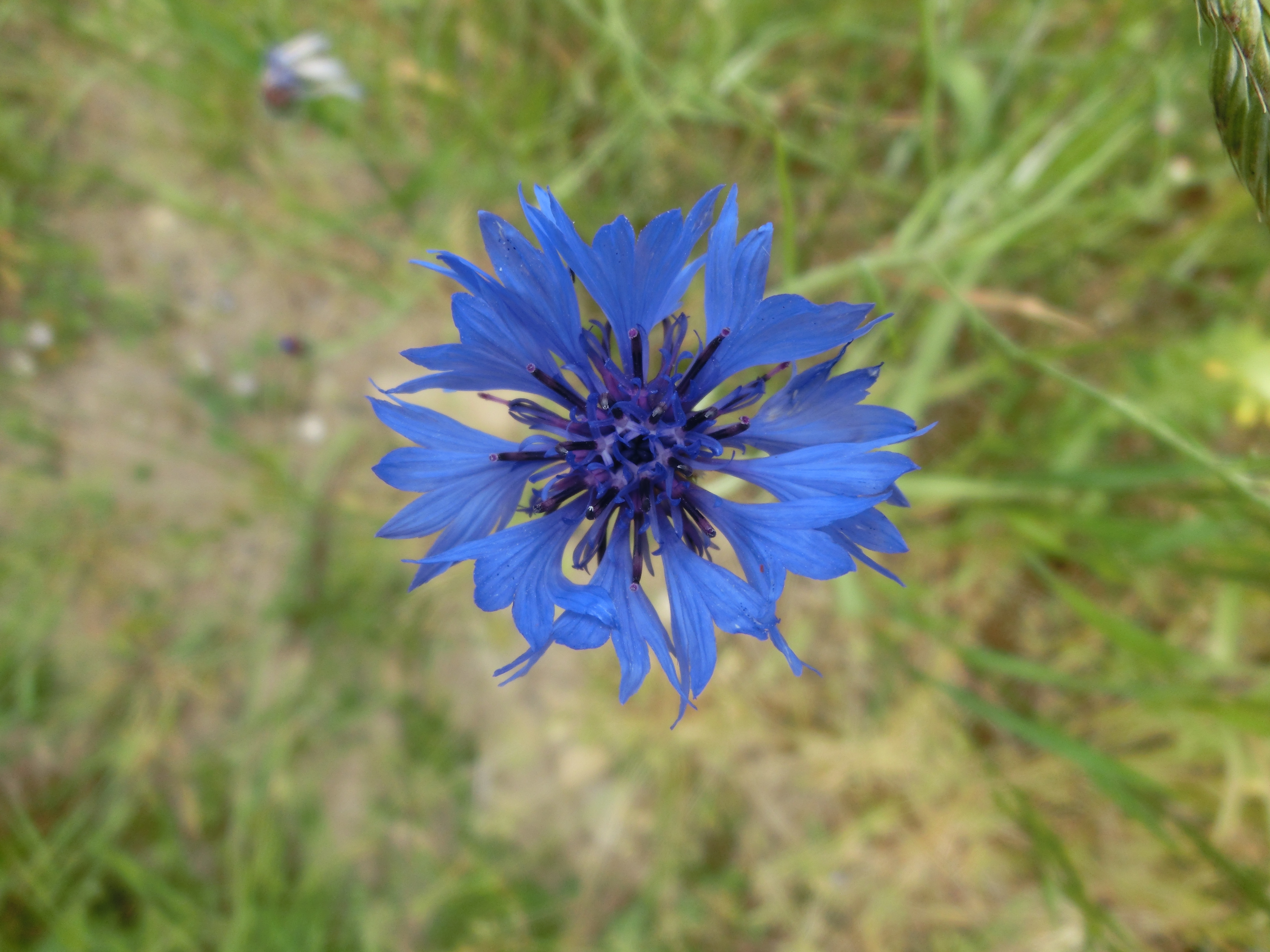

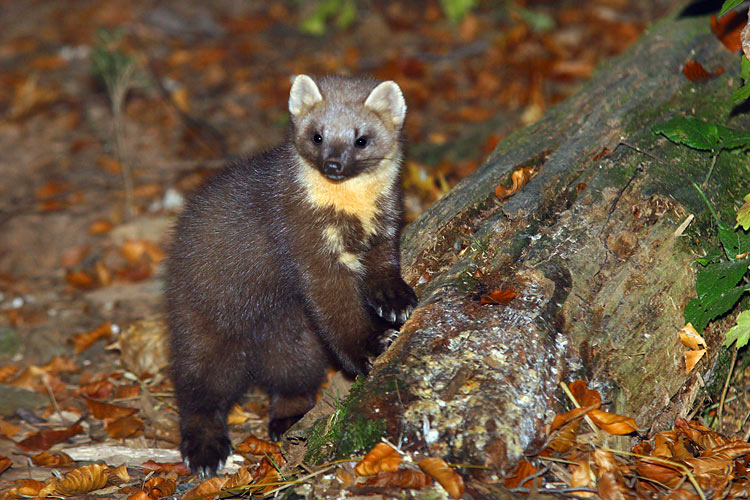

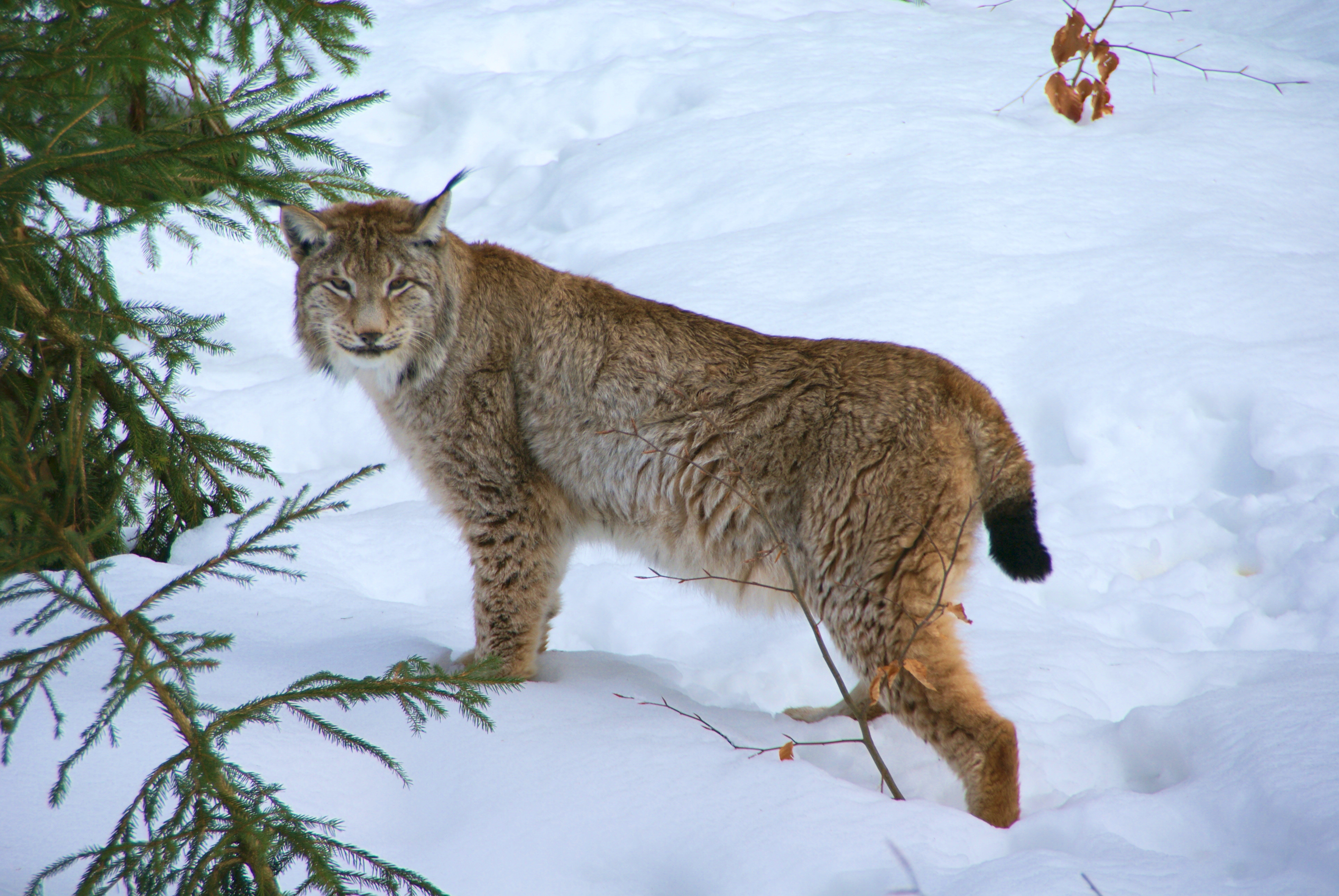

== See also ==
- List of fish in Germany
- List of birds of Germany
- List of mammals of Germany
