= Health in Germany =

As of 2025, the Human Rights Measurement Initiative finds that Germany is achieving 90% of what should be possible for the right to health, based on their level of income.

The expected human capital was calculated for 195 countries from 1990 to 2016 and defined for each birth cohort as the expected years lived from age 20 to 64 years and adjusted for educational attainment, learning or education quality, and functional health status. Germany had the twenty-fourth highest level of expected human capital with 25 health, education, and learning-adjusted expected years lived between age 20 and 64 years.

== Life expectancy ==
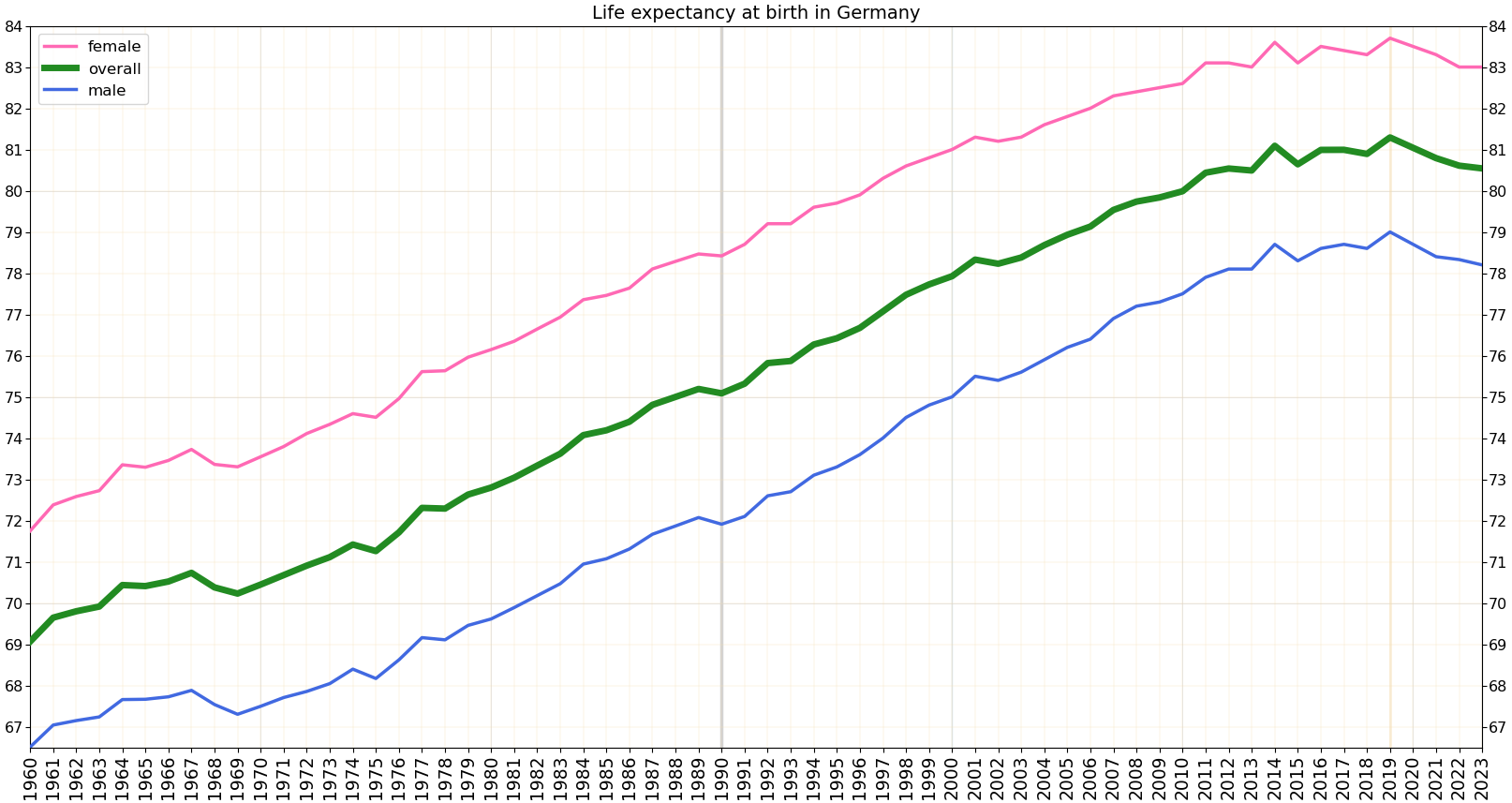
Life expectancy at birth in Germany, 1960-2022

In 2014, Germany ranked 20th in the world in life expectancy with 76.5 years for men and 82.1 years for women.

Germany had a very low infant mortality rate of 4.3 per 1,000 live births in 2014.

== Epidemiology ==
Obesity is a major health issue in Germany. A 2007 study showed Germany has the highest number of overweight people in Europe. However, the United Kingdom, Greece and certain countries in Eastern Europe have a higher rate of "truly obese" people. German Federal Office of Statistics ranks Germany as the 43rd fattest country in the World with a rate of 60.1%.

In 2015 it was estimated that 11.5% of the population has diabetes type 2, costing about $4,943 per person per year.

In a 2020 study the three most common diagnoses for women were heart disease, dementia and cardiovascular diseases.

In 2002, the top diagnosis for male patients released from a hospital was heart disease, followed by alcohol-related disorders and hernias.

In 2016, an epidemiological study highlighted differences among the 16 federal states of Germany in terms of prevalence and mortality for the major cardiovascular diseases (CVD). The prevalence of major CVD was negatively correlated with the number of cardiologists, whereas it did not show any correlation with the number of primary care providers, general practitioners or non-specialized internists. A more relevant positive relation was found between the prevalence or mortality of major CVD and the number of residents per chest pain unit. Bremen, Saarland and the former East German states had higher prevalence and mortality rates for major CVD and lower mean lifespan durations.

According to a 2013 micro-census survey, 24.5% of the German population aged 15+ were smokers (29 percent in men, 20 percent in women). Among the 18- to 25-year-old age group, 35.2% are smokers.

At the end of 2004, some 44,900 Germans, or less than 0.1 percent of the population, were infected with HIV/AIDS. In the first half of 2005, German health authorities registered 1,164 new infections; about 60 percent of the cases involved homosexual men. Since the beginning of the HIV/AIDS epidemic, about 24,000 Germans have died from the disease.}

For home care for the elderly, the family caregivers receive a relief of €125 per month. The actual amount of relief can be found in the Social Insurance Code under § 45b SGB XI.

A 2015 report published by the EU Commission found that the life expectancy in Germany was glaringly lower than that in other big European Union countries such as Italy, France and Spain, though it was still higher than the average life expectancy of the whole of EU. The report had some other interesting findings about health in Germany. Incidence of cardiovascular diseases had been declining since 2000 while cancer as a cause of death was on the increase. Incidence of dementia too was on the rise. The number of deaths due to Alzheimer's disease rose from 6,000 in 2000 to 35,000 in 2014.

== History ==
At the end of the nineteenth century Berlin had the highest urban density of any city in Europe. Only 8% of dwellings in the city had a toilet. There were repeated outbreaks of cholera and typhus. Rudolf Virchow promoted sewage works, called Rieselfelder, after the cholera epidemic of 1868. In 1871 a smallpox epidemic killed 6478 people. Virchow estimated that 5% of the Berlin population were infected by venereal disease.

Tuberculosis was estimated to be the cause of about 15% of all deaths in Prussia in 1860.

From 1883 Otto von Bismarck introduced several items of social legislation: the Health Insurance Bill of 1883, Accident Insurance Bill of 1884, and the Old Age and Disability Insurance Bill of 1889.

In 2014, Germany was eighth place worldwide in the number of practicing physicians, at 3.3 per 1,000 people.

== Vaccination ==
In Germany, the Standing Committee on Vaccination is the federal commission responsible for recommending an immunization schedule. The Robert Koch Institute in Berlin (RKI) compiles data of immunization status upon the entry of children at school, and measures vaccine coverage of Germany at a national level. Founded in 1972, the STIKO is composed of 12–18 volunteers, appointed members by the Federal Ministry for Health for 3-year terms. The independent advisory group meets biannually to address issues pertaining to preventable infectious diseases. Although the STIKO makes recommendations, immunization in Germany is voluntary and there are no official government recommendations. German Federal States typically follow the Standing Vaccination Committee's recommendations minimally, although each state can make recommendations for their geographic jurisdiction that extends beyond the recommended list. In addition to the proposed immunization schedule for children and adults, the STIKO recommends vaccinations for occupational groups, police, travelers, and other at risk groups. Vaccinations recommendations that are issued must be in accordance with the Protection Against Infection Act (Infektionsschutzgesetz), which regulates the prevention of infectious diseases in humans. If a vaccination is recommended because of occupational risks, it must adhere to the Occupational Safety and Health Act involving Biological Agents. In the event of vaccination related injuries, federal states are responsible for monetary compensation. Germany's central government does not finance childhood immunizations, so 90% of vaccines are administered in a private physician's office and paid for through insurance. The other 10% of vaccines are provided by the states in public health clinics, schools, or day care centers by local immunization programs. Physician responsibilities concerning immunization include beginning infancy vaccination, administering booster vaccinations, maintaining medical and vaccination history, and giving information and recommendations concerning vaccines.

== See also ==
- Healthcare in Germany
