= 1904 in Germany =

- Decades: 1880s; 1890s; 1900s; 1910s; 1920s
- See also: Other events of 1904; History of Germany • Timeline • Years

Events in the year 1904 in Germany.

== Incumbents ==
=== National level ===
- Emperor – Wilhelm II
- Chancellor – Bernhard von Bülow

=== State level ===
==== Kingdoms ====
- King of Bavaria – Otto
- King of Prussia – Wilhelm II
- King of Saxony – George to 15 October then Frederick Augustus III
- King of Württemberg – William II

==== Grand duchies ====
- Grand Duke of Baden – Frederick I
- Grand Duke of Hesse – Ernest Louis
- Grand Duke of Mecklenburg–Schwerin – Frederick Francis IV
- Grand Duke of Mecklenburg–Strelitz – Frederick William to 30 May, then Adolphus Frederick V
- Grand Duke of Oldenburg – Frederick Augustus II
- Grand Duke of Saxe–Weimar–Eisenach – William Ernest

==== Principalities ====
- Schaumburg–Lippe – George, Prince of Schaumburg–Lippe
- Schwarzburg–Rudolstadt – Günther Victor, Prince of Schwarzburg–Rudolstadt
- Schwarzburg–Sondershausen – Karl Günther, Prince of Schwarzburg–Sondershausen
- Principality of Lippe – Alexander, Prince of Lippe (with Ernest II, Count of Lippe–Biesterfeld to 26 September, and then Leopold, Count of Lippe–Biesterfeld, as regents)
- Reuss Elder Line – Heinrich XXIV, Prince Reuss of Greiz (with Heinrich XIV, Prince Reuss Younger Line as regent)
- Reuss Younger Line – Heinrich XIV, Prince Reuss Younger Line
- Waldeck and Pyrmont – Friedrich, Prince of Waldeck and Pyrmont

==== Duchies ====
- Duke of Anhalt – Frederick I, Duke of Anhalt to 24 January, then Frederick II, Duke of Anhalt
- Duke of Brunswick – Prince Albert of Prussia (regent)
- Duke of Saxe–Altenburg – Ernst I, Duke of Saxe–Altenburg
- Duke of Saxe–Coburg and Gotha – Charles Edward, Duke of Saxe–Coburg and Gotha
- Duke of Saxe–Meiningen – Georg II, Duke of Saxe–Meiningen

==== Colonial governors ====
- Cameroon (Kamerun) – Jesko von Puttkamer (8th term) to 9 May, then Otto Gleim (acting governor) (1st term)
- Kiaochow (Kiautschou) – Oskar von Truppel
- German East Africa (Deutsch–Ostafrika) – Gustav Adolf von Götzen
- German New Guinea (Deutsch–Neuguinea) – Albert Hahl (2nd term)
- German Samoa (Deutsch–Samoa) – Wilhelm Solf
- German South–West Africa (Deutsch–Südwestafrika) – Theodor Leutwein
- Togoland – Waldemar Horn

== Events ==
- 12 January – The Herero of Deutsch–Südwestafrika, under the leadership of Samuel Maharero, rise against German colonial rule. The rising marks the beginning of what has become known as the Herero and Namaqua Genocide.
- January 16 – Rosa Luxemburg is sentenced to 3 months in prison for lese majeste (election campaign in 1903).
- 3 March – Kaiser Wilhelm II becomes the first person to make a political recording of a document, using Thomas Edison's cylinder.
- April - The German Imperial Navy introduces SOS as a distress signal.
- 11 August – The German Imperial Army, under Lothar von Trotha, defeat the Herero tribesmen at the Battle of Waterberg.

== Architecture ==
- The Prussian House of Lords is rebuilt.
- The Kaiserbrücke in Mainz is completed.
- Publisher Pier Verlag established in Munich.

== Arts ==
- January – Süddeutsche Monatshefte begins publication.
- Max Beckmann, Hans Purrmann, and Alexej von Jawlensky are added to the Berlin Secession group of artists.
- Leopold Graf von Kalckreuth paints a series of three portraits depicting socialite Marianne Lichtwark.

== Commerce ==
- September – Stationery manufacturer Herlitz established in Berlin.
- Accumulatoren–Fabrik AFA establishes its battery making subsidiary VARTA in Hagen.

== Diplomacy ==
- 8 April – The Convention of Istanbul, signed by a number of powers including Germany in 1888, came into force.

== Science ==
- Foundation of the German Journal for Evidence and Quality in Healthcare.

== Sport ==
=== Association football ===
- 16 April – FC Einigkeit Braunschweig established.
- 4 May – FC Schalke 04 established.
- 21 May – The International Federation of Association Football, FIFA, is established with Germany as a founder member.
- 13 June – Westfalia Herne established.
- 1 July – Bayer 04 Leverkusen established.
- 4 July – Borussia Fulda established.
- 25 July – Reinickendorfer FC West established.
- 29 July – Alemannia Schwäbisch Gmünd established.
- 4 August – FC Singen 04 established.
- Date unknown – Germania Breslau, Sport Club Reuß, Fußball–Club Prussia Königsberg, Oberhausener SV and 1. Würzburger FV 04 amongst the other clubs established.

=== Other ===
- 1 July to 24 November – 1904 Summer Olympics take place in St. Louis, Missouri. Germany finishes second in the overall medal table with four gold medals, four silver and five bronze. The four gold medals all come in the swimming events, with two for Emil Rausch and one each for Walter Brack and Georg Zacharias.
- Date unknown – The inaugural Berlin City Chess Championship is won by Horatio Caro.

== Transport ==
- November 1 – The Berlin Mexikoplatz station is opened under the name Zehlendorf–Beerenstraße.

=== Ships launched ===
- May 14 – SS Scharnhorst (passenger liner)
- May 14 – SMS Yorck (armoured cruiser)
- May 27 – SMS Lothringen (battleship)
- November 19 – SMS Deutschland (battleship)

== Publications ==
=== Drama ===
- Erich Mühsam – The Con Men
- Frank Wedekind – Die Büchse der Pandora

=== Non–fiction ===
- Ernst Haeckel – Kunstformen der Natur

== Births ==
- 2 January – Walter Heitler, physicist (died 1981)
- 8 January – Karl Brandt, Nazi physician (died 1948)
- 9 January – Wilhelm Groth, physical chemist (died 1977)
- 14 January – Ernst Wellmann, army officer (died 1970)
- 29 January – Arnold Gehlen, German philosopher (died 1976)
- 18 February – Otto Rahn, medievalist and SS officer (died 1939)
- 22 February – Ernst Jakob Henne, racing driver (died 2005)
- 28 February – Alfred Bohrmann, astronomer
- 5 March – Karl Rahner, theologian
- 7 March – Reinhard Heydrich, chief of the RSHA (died 1942)
- 7 March – Kurt Weitzmann, art historian
- 10 March – Adalbert Schneider, Navy officer
- 11 March – Albrecht von Hagen, Resistance fighter
- 12 March – Adolf Arndt, politician
- 21 March – Karl Leonhard, psychiatrist
- 24 March – Hans Ertel, natural scientist
- 26 March – Hermann Schroeder, composer
- 6 April – Kurt Georg Kiesinger, Chancellor of the Federal Republic of Germany (died 1988)
- 12 April – Paul Dahlke, actor
- 15 April – Valentin Krempl, bobsledder
- 17 April – Franz Reuß, Luftwaffe general
- 27 April – Fritz Weitzel, SS officer
- 28 April – Elisabeth Schumacher, Resistance fighter
- 4 May – Josef Pieper, philosopher
- 8 May – Franz Schreiber, SS officer
- 23 May – Johannes Flintrop, critic of Nazism
- 7 June – Werner Gruner, German weapons designer (died 1995)
- 14 June – Marion Yorck von Wartenburg, jurist and Resistance fighter (died 2007)
- 20 June – Heinrich von Brentano, politician (died 1964)
- 9 July – Ernst Küppers, swimmer
- 14 July – Hans von Herwarth, diplomat
- 15 July – Rudolf Arnheim, film theorist
- 2 August – Werner Seelenbinder, wrestler and communist
- 9 August – Hasso von Boehmer, Army officer
- 10 August – Karl Helling, chess master
- 16 August – Klaus von Pape, Nazi 'martyr'
- 24 August – Ludwig Schmidseder, composer and pianist
- 29 August – Werner Forssmann, physician and Nobel Prize in Medicine laureate
- 30 August – Friedrich von Mellenthin, Army general
- 1 September – Karl Ernst, Sturmabteilung leader
- 8 September – Karl Hessenberg, mathematician
- 14 September
  - Walter Meyer, rower
  - Richard Mohaupt, German composer and kapellmeister (died 1957)
- 21 October – Basilea Schlink, founder and leader of the Evangelical Sisterhood of Mary
- 23 October – Maximilien de Furstenberg, Roman Catholic cardinal
- 12 November – Edmund Veesenmayer, Nazi politician
- 13 November – Günter Reimann, communist activist
- 13 November – Peter Yorck von Wartenburg, jurist and Resistance fighter
- 26 November – Bernhard Krüger, SS officer
- 11 December – Felix Nussbaum, surrealist painter
- Date unknown – Heinz Kloss, linguist
- Date unknown – Wolfgang Stresemann, orchestra leader

== Deaths ==
- 4 January – Friedrich Jolly, neurologist
- 5 January – Karl Alfred von Zittel, palaeontologist
- 6 January – Friedrich von Hefner-Alteneck, electrical engineer
- 10 January – Christian August Friedrich Garcke, botanist
- 20 January – Albert von Maybach, railway manager
- 24 January – Frederick I, Duke of Anhalt, nobleman
- 24 February – Ernst von Prittwitz und Gaffron, Prussian general
- 5 March – Alfred von Waldersee, Field Marshal
- 22 March – Karl Moritz Schumann, botanist
- 1 April – Otto von Böhtlingk, Indologist
- 6 May – Franz von Lenbach, painter
- 21 May – Duke Paul Frederick of Mecklenburg, nobleman
- 24 May – Duchess Maria Isabella of Württemberg, noblewoman
- 30 May – Frederick William, Grand Duke of Mecklenburg–Strelitz, nobleman
- 5 July – Franz Martin Hilgendorf, zoologist
- 4 August – Christoph von Sigwart, philosopher
- 5 August – Karl Weigert, pathologist
- 9 August – Friedrich Ratzel, geographer
- 26 August – Franz Riegel, internist
- 3 September – Heinrich Koebner, dermatologist
- 18 September – Herbert von Bismarck, politician
- 26 September – Ernest II, Count of Lippe–Biesterfeld, nobleman, regent of the Principality of Lippe
- 8 October – Clemens Winkler, chemist who discovered germanium
- 15 October – George, King of Saxony
- 29 October – Emil Schlagintweit, scholar of Tibetan Buddhism
- 10 November – Alphons Stübel, geologist and vulcanologist
- 19 November – Hans von Hopfen, writer
- 2 December – Prince Frederick of Hohenzollern–Sigmaringen, nobleman
- 20 December – Alexandrine of Baden (1820–1904), noblewoman
- 25 December – Guido Bodländer, chemist
- Date unknown
  - Gustav Kessler, trade unionist
  - Eduard von Martens, zoologist
  - Carl August Wilhelm Schwacke, botanist
