= 1902 in Germany =

- Decades: 1880s; 1890s; 1900s; 1910s; 1920s
- See also: Other events of 1902; History of Germany • Timeline • Years

The following is a list of events from the year 1902 in Germany.

== Incumbents ==
=== National level ===
- Emperor – Wilhelm II
- Chancellor – Bernhard von Bülow

=== State level ===
==== Kingdoms ====
- King of Bavaria – Otto
- King of Prussia – Wilhelm II
- King of Saxony – Albert to 19 June, then George
- King of Württemberg – William II

==== Grand duchies ====
- Grand Duke of Baden – Frederick I
- Grand Duke of Hesse – Ernest Louis
- Grand Duke of Mecklenburg-Schwerin – Frederick Francis IV
- Grand Duke of Mecklenburg-Strelitz – Frederick William
- Grand Duke of Oldenburg – Frederick Augustus II
- Grand Duke of Saxe-Weimar-Eisenach – William Ernest

==== Principalities ====
- Schaumburg-Lippe – George, Prince of Schaumburg-Lippe
- Schwarzburg-Rudolstadt – Günther Victor, Prince of Schwarzburg-Rudolstadt
- Schwarzburg-Sondershausen – Karl Günther, Prince of Schwarzburg-Sondershausen
- Principality of Lippe – Alexander, Prince of Lippe (with Ernest II, Count of Lippe-Biesterfeld as regent)
- Reuss Elder Line – Heinrich XXII, Prince Reuss of Greiz to 19 April, then Heinrich XXIV, Prince Reuss of Greiz (with Heinrich XIV, Prince Reuss Younger Line as regent)
- Reuss Younger Line – Heinrich XIV, Prince Reuss Younger Line
- Waldeck and Pyrmont – Friedrich, Prince of Waldeck and Pyrmont

==== Duchies ====
- Duke of Anhalt – Frederick I, Duke of Anhalt
- Duke of Brunswick – Prince Albert of Prussia (regent)
- Duke of Saxe-Altenburg – Ernst I, Duke of Saxe-Altenburg
- Duke of Saxe-Coburg and Gotha – Charles Edward, Duke of Saxe-Coburg and Gotha
- Duke of Saxe-Meiningen – Georg II, Duke of Saxe-Meiningen

==== Colonial governors ====
- Cameroon (Kamerun) – Jesko von Puttkamer (7th term) to 3 February, then ... Plehn (acting governor) to 2 October, then again Jesko von Puttkamer (8th term)
- Kiaochow (Kiautschou) – Oskar von Truppel
- German East Africa (Deutsch-Ostafrika) – Gustav Adolf von Götzen
- German New Guinea (Deutsch-Neuguinea) – Albert Hahl (acting governor to 10 November) (2nd term)
- German Samoa (Deutsch-Samoa) – Wilhelm Solf
- German South-West Africa (Deutsch-Südwestafrika) – Theodor Leutwein
- Togoland – August Köhler to 20 January, then vacant to 1 December, then Waldemar Horn

== Events ==
- December–February 1903 – Venezuelan crisis, in which Britain, Germany and Italy sustain a naval blockade on Venezuela to enforce collection of outstanding financial claims. This prompts the development of the Roosevelt Corollary to the Monroe Doctrine.

== Births ==
- 6 January – Helmut Poppendick, German physician (died 1994)
- 17 January – Martin Harlinghausen, German air force general (died 1986)
- 30 January – Nikolaus Pevsner, German-born British architectural historian (died 1983)
- 1 February – Therese Brandl, German concentration camp guard and war criminal (d. 1948)
- 5 February – Paul Nevermann, German politician (died 1979)
- 7 March – Heinz Rühmann, German actor (died 1994)
- 18 March – Siegfried Westphal, German general (died 1982)
- 21 March – Gustav Fröhlich, German actor (died 1987)
- 2 April – Jan Tschichold, German-born typographer (died 1974)
- 25 April – Werner Heyde, German psychiatrist (died 1964)
- 10 July – Kurt Alder, German chemist (died 1958)
- 2 August – Moshe Rudolf Bloch German-born Israeli scientist (died 1985)
- 12 August – Franz Etzel, German politician (died 1970)
- 13 August – Felix Wankel, German engineer (died 1988)
- 22 August – Leni Riefenstahl, German film director, producer, screenwriter, editor, photographer, actress and dancer. (died 2003)
- 5 September – Fritz-Dietlof von der Schulenburg, German government official and a member of the German Resistance in the 20 July Plot (died 1944)
- 21 October – Kurt Scharf, German clergyman and bishop of the Evangelical Church in Berlin-Brandenburg (died 1990)
- 1 November – Eugen Jochum, German conductor (died 1987)
- 4 November – Otto Bayer, German chemist (died 1982)
- 22 November – Moshe Unna, German-born Israeli politician (died 1989)
- 21 December – Ulrich Wilhelm Graf Schwerin von Schwanenfeld, German landowner, officer, and resistance fighter against the Nazi régime (died 1944)

== Deaths ==
- 7 January – Wilhelm Hertz, writer (b. 1835)
- March 11 – Friedrich Engelhorn, German industrialist and founder of BASF (b. 1821)
- April 5 – Hans Ernst August Buchner, German bacteriologist (b. 1850)
- April 19
  - Heinrich XXII, Prince Reuss (Reuss Elder Line) of Greiz (b. 1846)
  - Hans von Pechmann, German chemist (b. 1850)
- 19 June – Albert, King of Saxony, (b. 1828)
- 5 September – Rudolf Virchow, German doctor, anthropologist, pathologist, prehistorian, biologist, writer, editor, and politician (b. 1821)
- 7 September – Franz Wüllner, German composer and conductor (b. 1832)
- 26 September – Levi Strauss, German-born American businessman, founder of the first company to manufacture blue jeans. (b. 1829)
- 25 November – Ernst Schröder, mathematician mainly known for being a major figure in mathematical logic (b. 1841)
