= 1989 in Israel =

- Decades: 1960s; 1970s; 1980s; 1990s; 2000s
- See also: History of Israel; Timeline of Israeli history; List of years in Israel

Events in the year 1989 in Israel.

== Incumbents ==
- President of Israel – Chaim Herzog
- Prime Minister of Israel – Yitzhak Shamir (Likud)
- President of the Supreme Court – Meir Shamgar
- Chief of General Staff – Dan Shomron
- Government of Israel – 23rd Government of Israel

== Events ==
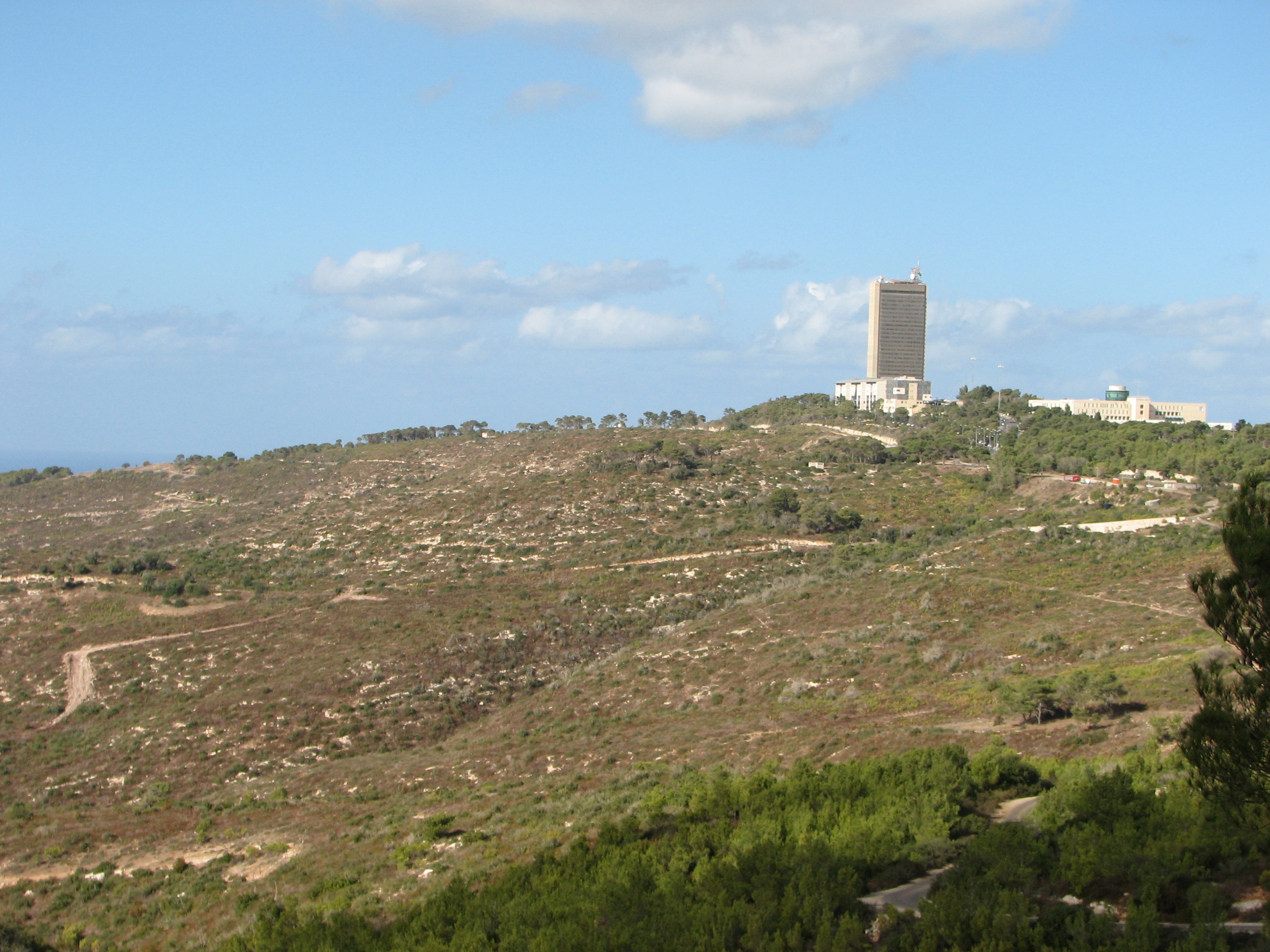
The area west of the University of Haifa which burnt up in the 1989 Mount Carmel forest fire. Picture taken in December 2010

- 6 May – Gili & Galit represents Israel at the Eurovision Song Contest with the song “Derekh Hamelekh” ("The King's Road").
- July – The 1989 Maccabiah Games are held.
- July 28 – Israeli commandos entered Lebanon and kidnapped Sheik Abdel Karim Obeid, chief of Hezbollah. (see Ron Arad).
- September 19–22 – 1989 Mount Carmel forest fire: One of the largest forest fire in Israel's history. The fire extended over 6,000 dunam (1,500 acres), devastates 3,200 dunam (790 acres) of natural forest areas of Aleppo pine on Mount Carmel in northern Israel, close to the city of Haifa.

=== Israeli–Palestinian conflict ===
The most prominent events related to the Israeli–Palestinian conflict which occurred during 1989 include:

==== Notable Palestinian militant operations against Israeli targets ====
The most prominent Palestinian Arab terror attacks committed against Israelis during 1989 include:

- February 24 - Sergeant Binyamin Meisner ambushed and killed with cement block thrown from rooftop in the Kasbah in Nablus.
- March 21 – 1989 Tel Aviv stabbing attack: A knife-wielding Palestinian Arab attacks Israeli civilians at random in Tel Aviv, killing two and wounding a third.
- May 3 – Hamas; Kidnapping and murder of Avi Sasportas and Ilan Saadon.
- July 6 – Tel Aviv Jerusalem bus 405 attack: The first Palestinian Arab suicide attack is carried out inside Israel's borders on a crowded Egged bus when a Palestinian Islamic Jihad member seizes the steering wheel from the driver and pulls the bus over a steep precipice into a ravine in the area of Qiryat Ye'arim. 16 passengers are killed.

==== Notable Israeli military operations against Palestinian militancy targets ====
The most prominent Israeli military counter-terrorism operations (military campaigns and military operations) carried out against Palestinian militants during 1989 include:

- May 19 – First Intifada: The Palestinian leader Ahmed Yassin, the founder and spiritual leader of Hamas, was arrested by Israel. Yassin was later on sentenced to life imprisonment for his involvement in attacks against Israelis.

==== Notable Israeli militant operations ====
The most prominent Israeli terror attacks committed against Palestinians during 1989 include:

- February & March – Sicarii claimed responsibility for multiple arsons and graffiti attacks of leftist Jewish political figures considered sympathetic to the plight of Palestinians.
- April 10 – Lone gunman wearing an Israeli army-issue uniform shot down four Arabs outside Jerusalem's Old City with a sub-machine gun. Sicarii claims responsibility for the shooting.

=== Unknown dates ===
- The founding of the kibbutz Neot Smadar.

== Notable births ==
- March 4 – Omer Goldman, Israeli activist
- April 4 – Benaia Barabi, singer and musician
- May 26 – Amit Farkash, Canadian-born Israeli actress and singer
- July 8 – Yarden Gerbi, Israeli judoka
- July 11 – Liel Kolet, Israeli singer, of Indian Jewish descent
- July 22 – Yon Tumarkin, Israeli actor
- August 10 – Ben Sahar, Israeli footballer
- October 8 – Hagit Yaso, Israeli singer
- December 26 – Noga Erez, Israeli singer, songwriter

== Notable deaths ==
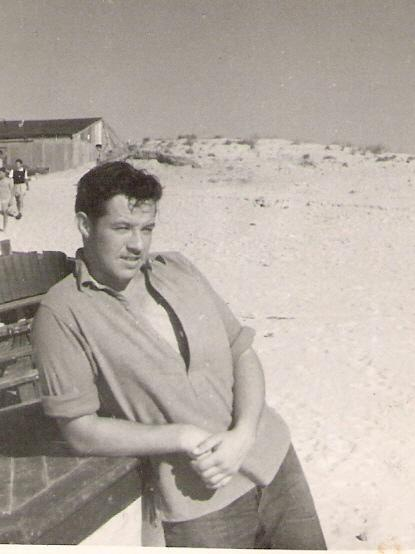
Dahn Ben-Amotz

- January 4 – Dvora Netzer (born 1897), Russian (Ukraine)-born Israeli politician.
- February 21 – Moshe Unna (born 1902), German-born Israeli politician.
- April 9 – Moshe Ziffer (born 1902), Austro-Hungarian (Galicia)-born Israeli sculptor.
- June 22 – Menahem Stern (born 1925), Polish-born Israeli historian.
- October 14 – Dov Sadan (born 1902), Austro-Hungarian (Galicia)-born Israeli academic and politician.
- October 20 – Dahn Ben-Amotz (born 1924), Polish-born Israeli journalist and author.
- Full date unknown
  - Manfred Aschner (born 1901) German (Silesia)-born Israeli microbiologist and entomologist.
  - Akiva Vroman (born 1912), Dutch-born Israeli geologist.

== See also ==
- 1989 in Israeli film
- 1989 in Israeli television
- 1989 in Israeli music
- 1989 in Israeli sport
- Israel in the Eurovision Song Contest 1989
