= 1987 in Germany =

- Decades: 1960s; 1970s; 1980s; 1990s; 2000s
- See also: Other events of 1987; History of Germany; Timeline; Years

Events in the year 1987 in Germany.

== Incumbents ==
- President – Richard von Weizsäcker
- Chancellor – Helmut Kohl

== Events ==
- 25 January – West German federal election, 1987
- 20 February–3 March – 37th Berlin International Film Festival
- 12 March – The third cabinet Kohl led by Helmut Kohl was sworn in.
- 26 March – Germany in the Eurovision Song Contest 1987
- 17 May – Rhineland-Palatinate state election, 1987
- 12 June–20 September – documenta 8
- 12 June – "Tear down this wall!" speech by Ronald Reagan in Berlin
- September – Olof Palme Peace March
- Date unknown: German company Mannesmann acquired German company ZF Sachs.

== Births ==
- 8 January – Carmen Klaschka, German tennis player
- 20 January – Janin Lindenberg, German sprinter
- 9 February – Magdalena Neuner, German professional biathlete. She is the most successful woman of all time at Biathlon World Championships
- 4 April – Sami Khedira, German footballer
- 19 April – Daniel Schuhmacher, German singer and winner of Deutschland sucht den Superstar (season 6)
- 20 April
  - Thorsten Kirschbaum, German footballer
  - Michael Klauß, German footballer
- 28 April
  - Hanka Mittelstädt, German politician
  - Robin Schulz, musician, DJ and record producer
- 29 April – Christian Reitz, German sport shooter
- 18 June – Vanessa Hegelmaier, German model
- 3 July
  - Maximilian Mauff, German actor
  - Sebastian Vettel, German racing driver
- 22 August – Mischa Zverev, German tennis player
- 18 September – Johanna Uekermann, German politician
- 1 October – Daniel Adlung, German footballer
- 4 October – Marina Weisband, German politician
- 20 October – Marie Sophie Hingst, German historian and false claimant to Holocaust descent (d. 2019)
- 25 October – Fabian Hambüchen, German gymnast
- 11 December
  - Violetta Bock, politician
  - Peter Scholze, German mathematician

== Deaths ==
- 15 January – George Markstein, German-born English journalist and thriller writer (kidney failure; born 1926)
- 29 January – Otto Klemperer, physicist (born 1899)
- 1 February – Gustav Knuth, German actor (born 1901)
- 8 February – Max Seydewitz, German politician (born 1892)
- 10 February – Hans Rosenthal, German television presenter (born 1925)
- 13 March – Bernhard Grzimek, German zoo director, zoologist, book author, editor, and animal conservationist in postwar West-Germany (born 1909)
- 26 March – Eugen Jochum, German conductor (born 1902)
- 8 May – Carl Tchilinghiryan, German businessman (born 1910)
- 7 July – Hannelore Schroth, German actress (born 1922)
- 10 August – Edmund Germer, German electrical engineer and inventor (born 1901)
- 26 August – Georg Wittig, German chemist, Nobel Prize in Chemistry laureate (born 1897)
- 5 September – Wolfgang Fortner, German composer (born 1907)
- 16 October – Joseph Höffner, German cardinal of the Roman Catholic Church (born 1906)
- 28 November – Wolfgang Liebeneiner, German actor and film director (born 1905)
- 9 December – Prince Ernest Augustus of Hanover (born 1914)
- 18 December – Conny Plank, German musician (born 1940)
- 22 December – Gustav Fröhlich, German actor (born 1902)
- 31 December – Wolfgang Zeidler, German judge (born 1924)

== See also ==
- 1987 in German television
