= 1901 in Germany =

- Decades: 1880s; 1890s; 1900s; 1910s; 1920s
- See also: Other events of 1901; History of Germany • Timeline • Years

The following is a list of events from the year 1901 in Germany.

== Incumbents ==
=== National level ===
- Emperor – Wilhelm II
- Chancellor – Bernhard von Bülow

=== State level ===
==== Kingdoms ====
- King of Bavaria – Otto
- King of Prussia – Wilhelm II
- King of Saxony – Albert
- King of Württemberg – William II

==== Grand duchies ====
- Grand Duke of Baden – Frederick I
- Grand Duke of Hesse – Ernest Louis
- Grand Duke of Mecklenburg-Schwerin – Frederick Francis IV
- Grand Duke of Mecklenburg-Strelitz – Frederick William
- Grand Duke of Oldenburg – Frederick Augustus II
- Grand Duke of Saxe-Weimar-Eisenach – Charles Alexander to 5 January, then William Ernest

==== Principalities ====
- Schaumburg-Lippe – George, Prince of Schaumburg-Lippe
- Schwarzburg-Rudolstadt – Günther Victor, Prince of Schwarzburg-Rudolstadt
- Schwarzburg-Sondershausen – Karl Günther, Prince of Schwarzburg-Sondershausen
- Principality of Lippe – Alexander, Prince of Lippe (with Ernest II, Count of Lippe-Biesterfeld as regent)
- Reuss Elder Line – Heinrich XXII, Prince Reuss of Greiz
- Reuss Younger Line – Heinrich XIV, Prince Reuss Younger Line
- Waldeck and Pyrmont – Friedrich, Prince of Waldeck and Pyrmont

==== Duchies ====
- Duke of Anhalt – Frederick I, Duke of Anhalt
- Duke of Brunswick – Prince Albert of Prussia (regent)
- Duke of Saxe-Altenburg – Ernst I, Duke of Saxe-Altenburg
- Duke of Saxe-Coburg and Gotha – Charles Edward, Duke of Saxe-Coburg and Gotha
- Duke of Saxe-Meiningen – Georg II, Duke of Saxe-Meiningen

==== Colonial governors ====
- Cameroon (Kamerun) – Jesko von Puttkamer (7th term)
- Kiaochow (Kiautschou) – Otto Jäschke to 27 January, then Max Rollmann (acting) to 8 June, then Oskar von Truppel
- German East Africa (Deutsch-Ostafrika) – Eduard von Liebert to 12 March, then Gustav Adolf von Götzen
- German New Guinea (Deutsch-Neuguinea) – Rudolf von Bennigsen to 10 July, then Albert Hahl (acting governor) (2nd term)
- German Samoa (Deutsch-Samoa) – Wilhelm Solf
- German South-West Africa (Deutsch-Südwestafrika) – Theodor Leutwein
- Togoland – August Köhler

== Events ==
- 23 February – Germany agrees the frontier between German East Africa and the British colony of Nyasaland with the United Kingdom.
- 6 March – Kaiser Wilhelm II survives an assassination attempt in Bremen.
- 10 July – Bielathal, Königstein, Saxony, launches the world's first regular passenger-carrying trolleybus service.
- 25 November – Dr. Alois Alzheimer examines Auguste Deter, eventually leading to a diagnosis of the condition that will carry Alzheimer's name.

=== Date unknown ===
- Oscar Troplowitz invents the medical plaster patch called "Leukoplast" for Beiersdorf.

== Births ==
- 11 January – Henning von Tresckow, German army officer and anti-Hitler conspirator (died 1944)
- 12 January – Karl Künstler, Nazi concentration camp commandant (died 1945)
- 19 January – Fred Uhlman, German-English writer, painter and lawyer (died 1985)
- 21 March – Karl Arnold, German politician (died 1958)
- 25 March – Yeshayahu Forder, German-Israeli lawyer and politician (died 1970)
- 27 March – Erich Ollenhauer, German politician (died 1963)
- 17 May – Max Lorenz, German tenor (died 1975)
- 21 May – Manfred Aschner, German-Israeli microbiologist and entomologist (died 1989)
- 27 May – Georg August Zinn, German politician (died 1976)
- 7 July – Gustav Knuth, German film actor (died 1987)
- 24 August – Edmund Germer, German electrical engineer and inventor (died 1987)
- 8 October – Adolf Weidmann, German athlete and sports official (died 1997)
- 15 October – Hermann Josef Abs, German banker (d. 1994)
- 5 December – Werner Heisenberg, German physicist (died 1976)
- 19 December – Rudolf Hell, German inventor (died 2002)
- 27 December – Marlene Dietrich, German actress and singer (died 1992)
- Undated – Yohanan Levi, German-born Hebrew linguist and historian, specializing in the Second Temple period (died 1945)

== Deaths ==
- 5 January – Charles Alexander, Grand Duke of Saxe-Weimar-Eisenach (b. 1818)
- 27 January – Otto Jäschke, governor of Kiaochow (Kiautschou)
- 10 February – Max von Pettenkofer, Bavarian chemist and hygienist (b. 1818)
- 6 July – Chlodwig, Prince of Hohenlohe-Schillingsfürst, German politician, Chancellor of Germany (b. 1819)
- 5 August – Empress Frederick, mother of Emperor Wilhelm II (b. 1840 in the United Kingdom)
- 21 August – Adolf Eugen Fick, German-born physician and physiologist (b. 1829)
- 23 October – Georg von Siemens, German banker (b. 1839)
- 28 October – Paul Rée, German author and philosopher (b. 1849)
- 25 November – Josef Gabriel Rheinberger, German composer (b. 1839)
- 6 December – Bertha Wehnert-Beckmann, German photographer (b. 1815)
