= 1988 in Germany =

Events in the year 1988 in West Germany and East Germany.

== Incumbents ==
=== West Germany ===
- President - Richard von Weizsäcker
- Federal Chancellor – Helmut Kohl

=== East Germany ===
- General Secretary of the Central Committee of the Socialist Unity Party of Germany – Erich Honecker
- Chairman of the State Council – Erich Honecker
- Chairman of the Council of Ministers – Willi Stoph

== Events ==
- 12 - 23 February — 38th Berlin International Film Festival
- 31 March — Germany in the Eurovision Song Contest 1988
- 28 August — Ramstein air show disaster

== Births ==
- 7 January – Lisett Stuppy, German politician
- 18 January — Angelique Kerber, German tennis player
- 20 January — Benjamin Ulrich, German rugby player
- 29 February — Benedikt Höwedes, German football player
- 2 March — Simon Terodde, German football player
- 12 March — Sebastian Brendel, German sprint canoeist
- 14 March — Rico Freimuth, German athlete
- 5 April — Swantje Schendel, German politician
- 12 April — Lisa Unruh, German archer
- 29 April — Julian Reus, German sprinter
- 8 June — Lisa Brennauer, German cyclist
- 19 July — Kevin Großkreutz, German football player
- 3 September — Jérôme Boateng, German football player
- 9 September — Fiona Erdmann, German model
- 3 October — Max Giesinger, German singer
- 5 October — Bahar Kızıl, German singer-songwriter
- 15 October — Mesut Özil, football player
- 1 December — Nadia Hilker, German actress and model
- 16 December — Mats Hummels, German football player

== Deaths ==
- 20 January — Paul Esser, German actor (b. 1913)
- 21 January — Werner Nachmann, President of Central Council of Jews in Germany (b. 1925)
- 28 January — Klaus Fuchs, physicist and spy (b. 1911)
- 9 March — Kurt Georg Kiesinger, 3rd Chancellor of West Germany (b. 1904)
- 9 May — Georg Moser, German bishop of Roman Catholic Church (b. 1923)
- 27 May — Ernst Ruska, German physicist who won the Nobel Prize in Physics (b. 1906)
- 20 July — Richard Holm, German operatic tenor (b. 1912)
- 27 July — Brigitte Horney, German actress (b. 1911)
- 5 September — Gert Fröbe, German actor (b. 1913)
- 16 September — Axel von Ambesser, German actor and film director (b. 1910)
- 7 September — Werner Felfe, East German statesman and high-ranking party functionary of the Socialist Unity Party of Germany (b. 1928)
- 3 October — Franz Josef Strauss, 8th Minister-President of Bavaria (b. 1915)
- 9 October — Felix Wankel, German engineer (b. 1902)
- 14 October — Charles Augustus, Hereditary Grand Duke of Saxe-Weimar-Eisenach (b. 1912)
- 20 December — Anni Schaad, German jewelry maker (b. 1911)

== See also ==
- 1988 in German television
