= Aschner =

Aschner is a surname. Notable people with the surname include:

- Georg Aschner, or Milivoj Ašner (1913–2011), Croatian police chief
- Ilse Maria Aschner (1918–2012), Austrian journalist and Holocaust survivor
- Manfred Aschner (1901–1989), German-born Israeli microbiologist and entomologist
- Marilyn Aschner (born 1948), American tennis player

== See also ==
- Asner
