= 1970 in Germany =

- Decades: 1950s; 1960s; 1970s; 1980s; 1990s
- See also: Other events of 1970; History of Germany • Timeline • Years

Events in the year 1970 in Germany.

== Incumbents ==
- President – Gustav Heinemann
- Chancellor – Willy Brandt

== Events ==
- 16 February – Germany in the Eurovision Song Contest 1970
- Willy Brandt (SPD),

West German chancellor since October 1969, and GDR vice president Willi Stoph meet in Erfurt (19 March) and in Kassel (21 May) - the start of a new Ostpolitik (new eastern policy)

- 26 March - the four ambassadors of the four powers meet to start negotiations about a Four Power Agreement on Berlin (which is agreed on 3 September 1971)
- 26 June - 7 July – 20th Berlin International Film Festival
- 12 August - the Treaty of Moscow between Western Germany and the Soviet Union is signed.
- 1 September: Merger of two German transportation/maritime companies, Hamburg America Line (HAPAG) and Norddeutscher Lloyd (NDL) or North German Lloyd (NGL) to new company Hapag Lloyd
- 7 December – Warschauer Kniefall

=== Landtag Elections ===
- 22 March: Bürgerschaftswahl in Hamburg
- 14 June:
  - Landtagswahl in Lower Saxony. The coalition of SPD and CDU ends; Minister President Alfred Kubel (SPD) forms his second cabinet
  - Landtagswahl in North Rhine-Westphalia (the SPD-FDP-coalition keeps its majority; MP Heinz Kühn forms his second cabinet)
  - Landtagswahl im Saarland: the SPD gets 27 seats and the CDU 23 seats. MP Franz-Josef Röder (CDU) forms his fourth cabinet.

== Births ==
- 15 January – Oktay Urkal, German boxer
- 23 January – Nicola Beer, German politician
- 28 January – Julia Jäger, German actress
- 29 January – Jörg Hoffmann, German swimmer
- 2 February – Anton Hofreiter, German politician
- 5 February – Astrid Kumbernuss, German shot putter
- 15 February – Jens Fiedler, German cyclist
- 18 March – Matthias Maurer, German astronaut
- 20 March – Bernhard Hoëcker, German comedian
- 18 April
  - Heike Friedrich, German swimmer
  - Esther Schweins, German comedian
- 20 April
  - Sven Benken, German footballer and manager
  - Chris Pfeiffer, German motorcycle racer and stuntman (died 2022)
- 25 May – Monica Lierhaus, German journalist
- 27 May – Bernhard, Margrave of Baden, German nobleman
- 7 June – Alexander Dobrindt, German politician
- 20 June – Andrea Nahles, German politician
- 29 June – Edda Mutter, German alpine skier
- 6 July – Roger Cicero, German jazz and pop musician (died 2016)
- 25 August – Claudia Schiffer, German model
- 8 September – Lars Vogt, German pianist (died 2022)
- 6 October – Corinna May, German singer
- 16 October – Mehmet Scholl, German football player and manager
- 15 November – Uschi Disl, German biathlete

== Deaths ==
- 5 January – Max Born, German physicist and mathematician (born 1882)
- 27 January – Erich Heckel, German painter (born 1883)
- 30 January – Fritz Bayerlein, German general (born 1899)
- 16 February – Carl de Vogt, German actor (born 1885)
- 30 March – Heinrich Brüning, German politician, former chancellor of Germany (born 1885)
- 3 April – Nikolaus, Hereditary Grand Duke of Oldenburg (born 1897)
- 9 May – Franz Etzel, German politician (born 1902)
- 12 May – Nelly Sachs, German poet and playwright (born 1891)
- 3 June – Hjalmar Schacht, German economist, banker, liberal politician (born 1877)
- 6 June – Friedrich Köchling, Wehrmacht general (born 1893)
- 17 July – Ernst Wellmann, army officer (born 1904)
- 19 July – Egon Eiermann, architect (born 1904)
- 1 August – Otto Heinrich Warburg, German physiologist, medical doctor, and Nobel laureate (born 1883)
- 10 August – Bernd Alois Zimmermann, German composer (born 1918)
- 25 September – Erich Maria Remarque, German novelist (born 1898)
- 2 October – Grethe Weiser, German actress (born 1903)
- 3 October - Princess Victoria Adelaide of Schleswig-Holstein, Duchess of Saxe-Coburg and Gotha (born 1885)
- 4 October - Jella Lepman, German journalist, author and translator (born 1891)
- 4 November – Friedrich Kellner, German public servant and diarist (born 1885)
- 14 December – Franz Schlegelberger, German jurist and politician (born 1876)
