= Mount Carmel forest fire =

Mount Carmel forest fire may refer to:

- 1989 Mount Carmel forest fire
- 2010 Mount Carmel forest fire
