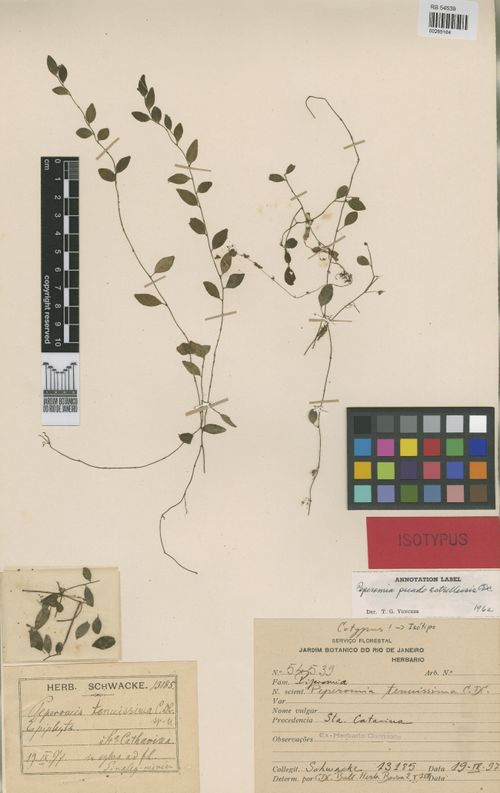

Scientific classification
- Kingdom: Plantae
- Clade: Tracheophytes
- Clade: Angiosperms
- Clade: Magnoliids
- Order: Piperales
- Family: Piperaceae
- Genus: Peperomia
- Species: P. tenuissima

Binomial name
- Peperomia tenuissima C.DC.

= Peperomia tenuissima =

Species of flowering plant

Peperomia tenuissima is a species of epiphyte in the genus Peperomia found in Brazil. It primarily grows on wet tropical biomes. Its conservation status is Threatened.

== Description ==
The first specimens where collected in Brazil.

Peperomia tenuissima has leaves that are very short, petiolate, subovate-elliptic at the base, acute at the tip, pubescent on both sides, and three-nerved. The catkins are quite long, pedunculated, barely longer than the leaves themselves; the bract is orbicular and subsessile in the center; the ovary emerges at the oblique apex; and the stigmatic berry is short, oblong, and mucronulate at the apex.

Ramulose branches on this epiphyte are extremely thin and heavily pubescent. The leaves change alternate. The dry membranous limbs measure 16 mm. long and 6 mm. wide. The petioles are 1 mm long and 6 mm wide. It has a very slender and glabrous catkins. The peduncles are pubescent and roughly 10 mm long. The ovary has an obliquely expanded tip. The bery is a 1/2 mm glabrous sessile. The anthers are elliptic.

It resembles P. caledonica, but the form of the leaves and the shorter petioles differ from it.

== Taxonomy and naming ==
It was described in 1901 by Casimir de Candolle in Bulletin de l'Herbier Boissier, sér. 2, 1, from specimens collected by Schwacke in 1897 . It gets its name from the characteristic of its branches, which means "Very Thin".

== Distribution and habitat ==
It is found in Santa Catarina, Brazil. It grows on epiphyte environment and is a herb. It grows on wet tropical biomes.

== Conservation ==
This species is assessed as Threatened, in a preliminary report.
