= Slavonska Požega transit camp =

1941 Croatian camp run by the Ustaše

Slavonska Požega
- Transit camp
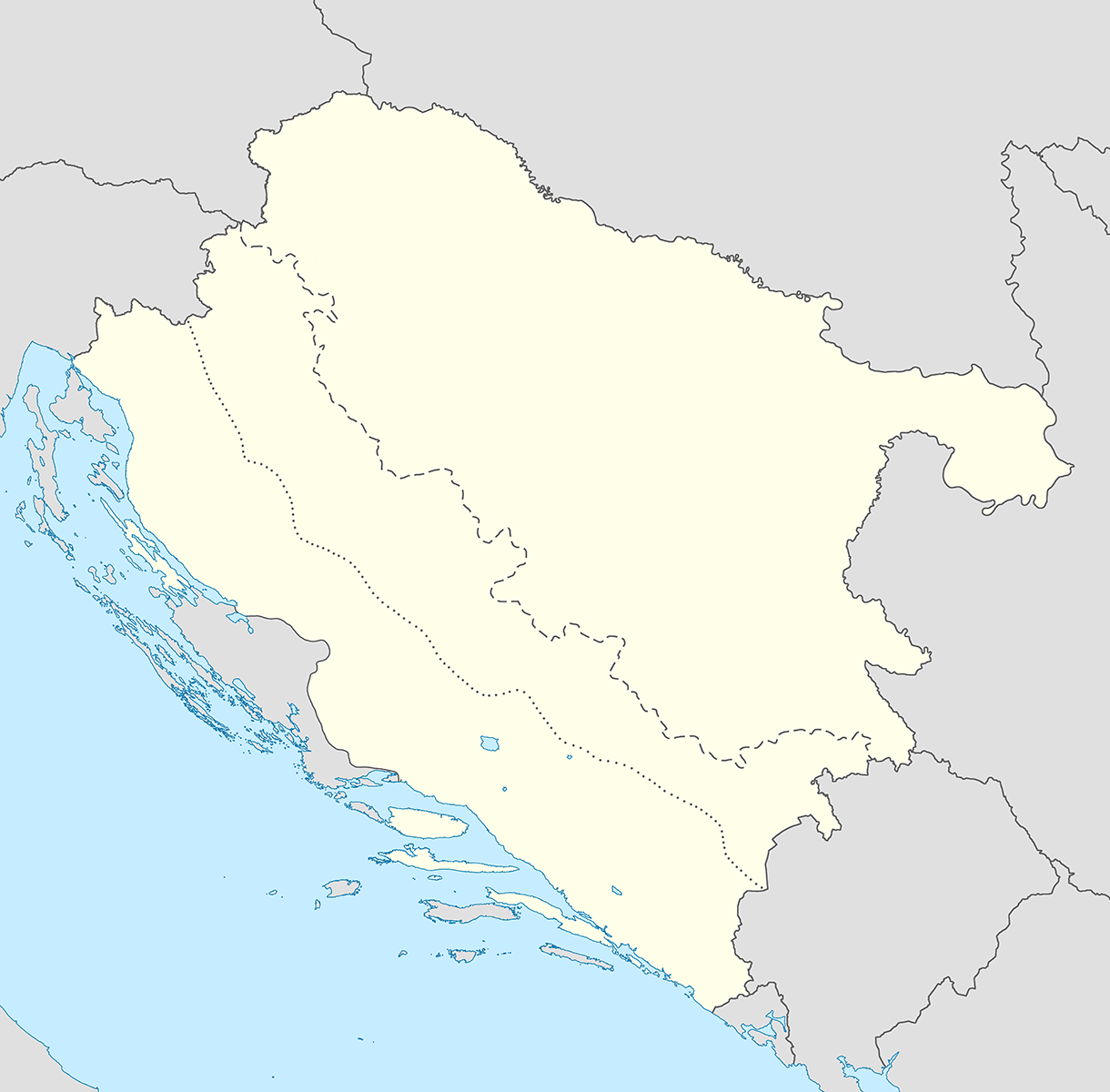
- Location of Slavonska Požega in the Independent State of Croatia
- Coordinates: 45°19′59″N 17°40′25″E
- Location: Slavonska Požega, Independent State of Croatia (modern-day Croatia)
- Operated by: Ustaše
- Original use: Military site
- Operational: July 1941 – 22 October 1941
- Inmates: Serbs, Slovenes
- Number of inmates: >9,500
- Killed: >785

Slavonska Požega was a transit camp operated by the fascist, Croatian nationalist Ustaše movement in the Independent State of Croatia (NDH) between July and October 1941, during World War II.

Located in the town of Slavonska Požega (modern-day Požega, Croatia) the camp was established in July 1941, at a site previously used by the Royal Yugoslav Army, to facilitate the deportation of ethnic Slovenes from German-occupied areas of Slovenia to the NDH and ethnic Serbs from the NDH to German-occupied Serbia. Its establishment was overseen by Slavonska Požega's police chief, Milivoj Ašner. The camp was commanded by Captain Ivan Stiper and guarded by the 14th Ustaše Company. The accommodations were insufficient to handle the large number of detainees, leading to severe overcrowding. Detainees were also given inadequate amounts of food, illnesses ran rampant and medical treatment was virtually non-existent. Although it was nominally a transit camp, many detainees were tortured and even killed by the guards. On 26 August, 785 detainees from Derventa and Bosanski Brod were shot. The camp was dissolved on 22 October. At least 9,500 detainees passed through it during its existence. The Ustaše administration continued to process belongings that had been stolen from the detainees until mid-November.

In 2005, prosecutors in Croatia charged Ašner with war crimes and crimes against humanity for his role in the deportation of Serbs and Jews from Slavonska Požega in 1941 and 1942. Austria, where Ašner was living, refused to extradite him, and he died in 2011 without ever having gone to trial.

== Background ==
=== Interwar Yugoslavia ===
Ethnic tensions between Serbs and Croats increased following the establishment of the Kingdom of Serbs, Croats and Slovenes in the aftermath of World War I. During the interwar period, many Croats came to resent Serb political hegemony in the newly established state, which resulted in the passing of legislation that favoured Serb political, religious and business interests. Tensions flared in 1928, following the shooting of five Croatian parliamentary deputies by the Montenegrin Serb politician Puniša Račić. Two died on the spot and two others were wounded but survived. A fifth, the opposition leader Stjepan Radić, died nearly two months later of complications attributed to the shooting. In January 1929, King Alexander instituted a royal dictatorship and renamed the country Yugoslavia. Shortly thereafter, the Croatian politician Ante Pavelić formed the Ustaše, a Croatian nationalist and fascist movement which sought to achieve Croatian independence through violent means. The Ustaše were outlawed in Yugoslavia, but received covert assistance from Benito Mussolini's Italy, which had territorial aspirations over Istria and Dalmatia. The Ustaše carried out a number of actions aimed at undermining Yugoslavia, most notably the Velebit uprising in 1932 and the assassination of King Alexander in Marseille in 1934. Following Alexander's assassination, the Ustaše movement's senior-most leaders, including Pavelić, were tried in absentia in both France and Yugoslavia and sentenced to death, but were granted protection by Mussolini and thus evaded capture.

Following the 1938 Anschluss between Nazi Germany and Austria, Yugoslavia came to share its northwestern border with Germany and fell under increasing pressure as its neighbours aligned themselves with the Axis powers. In April 1939, Italy opened a second frontier with Yugoslavia when it invaded and occupied neighbouring Albania. At the outbreak of World War II, the Royal Yugoslav Government declared its neutrality. Between September and November 1940, Hungary and Romania joined the Tripartite Pact, aligning themselves with the Axis, and Italy invaded Greece. Yugoslavia was by then almost completely surrounded by the Axis powers and their satellites, and its neutral stance toward the war became strained. In late February 1941, Bulgaria joined the Pact. The following day, German troops entered Bulgaria from Romania, closing the ring around Yugoslavia. Intending to secure his southern flank for the impending attack on the Soviet Union, German dictator Adolf Hitler began placing heavy pressure on Yugoslavia to join the Axis. On 25 March 1941, after some delay, the Royal Yugoslav Government conditionally signed the Pact. Two days later, a group of pro-Western, Serbian nationalist Royal Yugoslav Air Force officers deposed the country's regent, Prince Paul, in a bloodless coup d'état. They placed his teenage nephew Peter on the throne and brought to power a "government of national unity" led by the head of the Royal Yugoslav Air Force, General Dušan Simović. The coup enraged Hitler, who immediately ordered Yugoslavia's invasion, which commenced on 6 April 1941.

=== Creation of the NDH ===
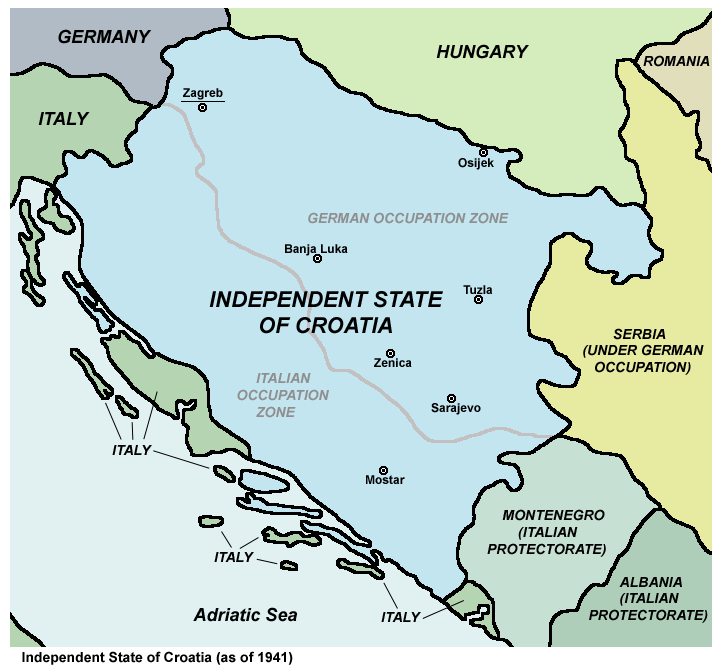
A map depicting the occupation and partition of Yugoslavia, 1941–1943

Yugoslavia was quickly overwhelmed by the combined strength of the Axis powers and surrendered in less than two weeks. The government and royal family went into exile, and the country was occupied and dismembered by its neighbours. Hitler wished to irrevocably dismantle Yugoslavia, which he dubbed a "Versailles construct". Serbia was reduced to its pre-Balkan War borders, becoming the only country in the Western Balkans to be directly occupied by the Germans. Serb-inhabited territories west of the Drina River were incorporated into the Axis puppet state known as the Independent State of Croatia (Croatian: Nezavisna država Hrvatska; NDH), which included most of modern-day Croatia, all of modern-day Bosnia and Herzegovina, and parts of modern-day Serbia. The establishment of the NDH had been announced over the radio by Slavko Kvaternik, a former Austro-Hungarian Army officer who had been in contact with Croatian nationalists abroad, on 10 April.

Pavelić entered the NDH on 13 April and reached Zagreb two days later. The same day, Germany and Italy extended diplomatic recognition to the NDH. Pavelić assumed control and bestowed himself the title Poglavnik ("leader"). At the time of its establishment, the NDH had a population of 6.5 million inhabitants, about half of whom were Croats. It was also inhabited by nearly two million Serbs, who constituted about one-third of its total population. Lands inhabited by Serbs accounted for 60–70 percent of the NDH's total landmass. Nevertheless, Serbs – along with others whom the Ustaše deemed "undesirable", such as Jews and Roma – were denied citizenship on the basis that they were not Aryans. Within hours of the NDH's creation, businesses brandished signs reading: "No Serbs, Gypsies, Jews and dogs". Additionally, immediate measures were taken to expunge the presence of the Cyrillic alphabet from the public sphere. On 17 April, the Ustaše instituted the Legal Provision for the Defence of the People and State, a law legitimizing the establishment of concentration camps and the mass shooting of hostages in the NDH. Thirty concentration camps in total were established across the puppet state.

== Operation ==
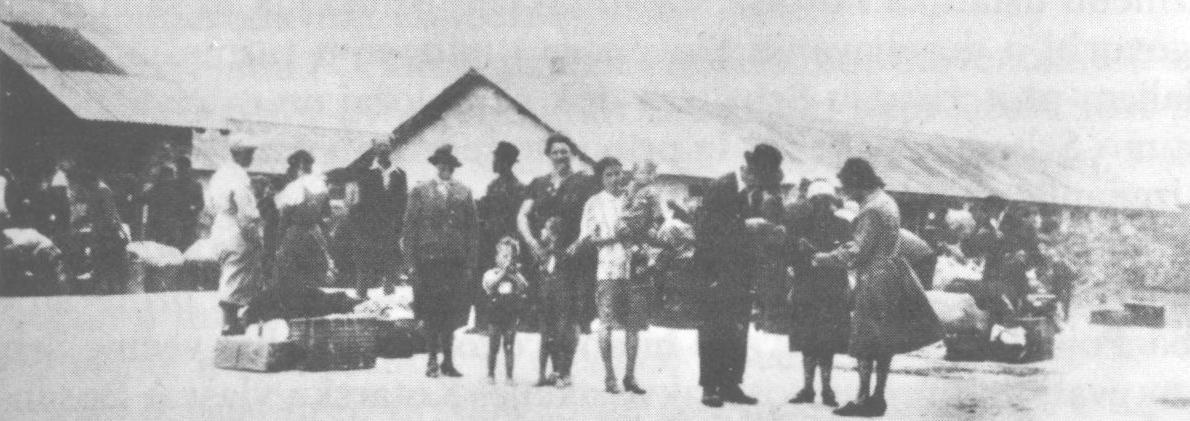
Slovenian deportees at the Slavonska Požega transit camp

Coinciding with Pavelić's visit to see Hitler at the Berghof on 4 June 1941, Croatian government ministers Slavko Kvaternik and Mladen Lorković met with Siegfried Kasche, the German ambassador to Croatia, and Harald Turner, the head of the German civilian administration in German-occupied Serbia, to negotiate the deportation of 180,000 ethnic Serbs living in the NDH to German-occupied Serbia and the simultaneous resettlement of 180,000 Slovenes to the NDH. The Ustaše wished to alter the ethnic makeup of Serb-majority areas of the NDH and the Germans wished to change the ethnic composition of certain parts of Slovenia. The NDH agreed to admit ethnic Slovenes expelled from German-occupied Slovenia, while simultaneously expelling ethnic Serbs from the NDH to German-occupied Serbia.

In July 1941, the Ustaše established a transit camp for Serbs and Slovenes in the town of Slavonska Požega (modern-day Požega, Croatia), 143 kilometres (89 mi) southeast of Zagreb. The camp's establishment was overseen by the town's police chief, Milivoj Ašner. A report submitted to the International Tracing Service (ITS) in the 1970s conservatively estimated that nearly 9,500 detainees had passed through the camp during its existence. Since this estimate was based on fragmentary documentation, the historian Joseph Robert White writes that the true number of detainees was probably higher. It was not uncommon for detainees to be robbed of their belongings, physically abused, and sometimes even killed by escorting Ustaše. The campgrounds, which consisted of barracks, a former arms depot and a military vehicle park surrounded by a wall with a barbed-wire fence, had originally been constructed by the Royal Yugoslav Army. The accommodations were insufficient to handle the large number of detainees, leading to severe overcrowding. The camp was commanded by Captain (Croatian: Satnik) Ivan Stiper. His adjutant, First Lieutenant (Croatian: Nadporučnik) Emil Klajič, commanded the 14th Ustaše Company, whose members guarded the camp. The company's strength varied between 130 and 223 men. Several Slovene detainees worked as part of the camp administration. Conditions at the camp were grim. Detainees were given inadequate amounts of food, illnesses ran rampant and medical treatment was virtually non-existent. Although it was nominally a transit camp, many detainees were tortured and even killed by the guards. On 26 August, 785 detainees from Derventa and Bosanski Brod were shot. Among those killed at the camp was the Serbian Orthodox monk Rafailo, the abbot of the Šišatovac Monastery in northern Serbia, who was tortured to death. The Slavonska Požega camp closed on 22 October 1941. The Ustaše administration continued to process belongings that had been stolen from the detainees until mid-November.

== Legacy ==
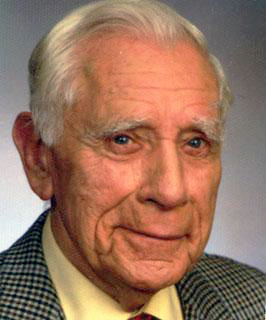
Milivoj Ašner as he appeared on his wanted poster, 2005

On 21 May 2000, the Abbot Rafailo was canonized by the Serbian Orthodox Church. In May 2004, the amateur investigator Alen Budaj alerted the Nazi hunter Efraim Zuroff, head of the Simon Wiesenthal Center's Jerusalem office, that Ašner was still alive and living in Croatia, having lived in exile in Austria until 1991. Budaj also provided Zuroff with documents implicating Ašner in wartime atrocities in Slavonska Požega. After Zuroff held a press conference outlining Budaj's findings, Ašner fled the country and returned to Austria. In 2005, prosecutors in Croatia charged Ašner with war crimes and crimes against humanity stemming from his involvement in the deportation of Jews and Serbs in 1941 and 1942. The Government of Croatia subsequently requested that Ašner be extradited from Austria, but the Government of Austria refused to extradite him.

In 2007, a sugar factory in Slavonska Požega produced a packet of sugar bearing Hitler's image. The incident was condemned by the Simon Wiesenthal Center. "If nothing else, this is a disgusting expression of nostalgia for the Third Reich and a period during which Jews, Serbs and Gypsies were mass-murdered," Zuroff remarked. He urged the Government of Croatia to force the factory owners to recall the sugar packets immediately, in line with the country's own laws prohibiting racial, religious and ethnic hatred. The following year, Ašner was photographed attending a football match at UEFA Euro 2008, which was co-hosted by Austria. He subsequently granted interviews to Croatian and British journalists. "Nothing ever happened to whoever was a loyal citizen of the Croatian state," Ašner claimed in one of the interviews. "For others, my theory was: You are not a Croat, you hate Croatia, okay, then please go back to you homeland." Ašner died in 2011, at the age of 98, without ever having gone to trial.
