= Asner =

Asner and Ašner are surnames. Notable people with the surname include:

- Ed Asner (1929–2021), American actor
- Greg Asner, American ecologist
- Jules Asner (born 1968), American television personality, writer, and fashion model
- Milivoj Ašner (1913–2011), Croatian police chief and war criminal

== See also ==
- Aschner
