= Plehn =

Plehn is a surname. Notable people with the surname include:

- Carl C. Plehn (1867–1945), American economist
- Elsbeth Plehn (1922–2001), German operatic contralto and voice teacher
- Marianne Plehn (1863–1946), German zoologist
- Michael T. Plehn (born 1965), lieutenant general in the United States Air Force
