= Carola Nossek =

German opera singer

Carola Nosseck
- Born: 10 February 1949; Schwerin, Allied-occupied Germany
- Died: 7 June 2026 (aged 77)
- Education: Hochschule für Musik Carl Maria von Weber Dresden
- Occupations: Operatic soprano; Academic voice teacher
- Organizations: Staatsoper Berlin; Hochschule für Musik "Hanns Eisler"
- Title: Kammersängerin

Carola Nossek (10 February 1949 – 7 June 2026) was a German operatic soprano and academic voice teacher. A member of the Staatsoper Berlin for two decades, she was awarded the title Kammersängerin. She appeared in world premieres and made several recordings in opera and concert settings.

== Life ==
Born in Schwerin, Mecklenburg-Vorpommern, Nossek received her first musical education at the conservatory of her hometown. After her Abitur, she began vocal studies at the Hochschule für Musik Carl Maria von Weber Dresden with Elsbeth Plehn. She belonged to the ensemble of the Staatsoper Dresden from 1972 to 1975, where she made her debut as Nanette in Lortzing's Der Wildschütz.

In 1974, she first appeared as a guest at the Staatsoper Berlin, became a member of the house in 1975 and remained until 1995. Her roles there included Despina in Mozart's Così fan tutte, Servilia in La clemenza di Tito, Marzelline in Beethoven's Fidelio, Ännchen in Weber's Der Freischütz, Marie in Smetana's Die verkaufte Braut, Woglinde in Wagner's Das Rheingold and Echo in Ariadne auf Naxos by Richard Strauss. In 1976, she took part in the world premiere of Joachim Werzlau's Meister Röckle. She toured in Japan with the ensemble of the Staatsoper Berlin, and appeared at the Festival of Las Palmas, Gran Canaria, as Despina and Marzelline in 1986. In Berlin, she sang the title role of Carl Orff's Die Kluge in 1990. She appeared there as Susanna in Mozart's Le nozze di Figaro in 1991, and as Nuri in d'Albert's Tiefland in 1995. She was awarded the title Kammersängerin.

A laureate of several competitions, including the International Johann Sebastian Bach Competition, she has given concerts and opera guest performances in Germany and abroad. She has been dedicated to lieder singing, and has recorded for radio, television and CD. Nossek recorded Bach's Mass in B minor and St Matthew Passion with Martin Flämig conducting the Dresdner Kreuzchor and the Dresdner Philharmonie. She recorded the role of Marzelline in Beethoven's Fidelio with Kurt Masur conducting the Rundfunkchor Leipzig and the Gewandhausorchester, alongside Jeannine Altmeyer in the title role, Siegfried Jerusalem as Florestan, and Siegmund Nimsgern as Don Pizarro. She appeared as Ighino on a recording of Pfitzner's Palestrina, with Peter Schreier in the title role, conducted by Otmar Suitner.

Nossek has taught voice at the Hochschule für Musik "Hanns Eisler" for more than a decade.
