= Moshe Rudolf Bloch =

Israeli scientist

Moshe Rudolf "Rudi" Bloch
- משה רודולף בלוך
- Born: August 2, 1902; Ústí nad Labem, Bohemia, Austria-Hungary
- Died: August 2, 1985 (aged 83)
- Education: University of Bern
- Known for: Crystal nucleation, refrigeration technology, solar energy research
- Awards: Israel Prize (1966), Weizmann Institute of Science prize (1966)
- Scientific career
- Fields: Metallography, Solar energy
- Workplaces: Technische Hochschule, Negev Desert Research Institute

Moshe Rudolf "Rudi" Bloch (Hebrew: משה רודולף בלוך; 2 August 1902 – 1985) was an Israeli scientist.

== Biography ==
Born in 1902 in the city of Ústí nad Labem, Bohemia, Austria-Hungary, he received a PhD from the University of Bern. In 1926, he became head of the department of Metallography X-ray Spectrography at the Technische Hochschule in Karlsruhe in Germany. His activities included work on crystal nucleation and on refrigeration technology, as well as experiments on the prevention of super cooling of water.

In Israel, Bloch was responsible for researching and developing solar energy processes and products sourced from the Dead Sea and became head of the Negev Desert Research Institute. He became a very prominent man in Israeli solar energy.

== Awards and honours ==
- In 1966, Bloch was awarded the Israel Prize in life sciences.
- In 1966, he also was awarded the Weizmann Institute of Science prize for science.
- He held honorary positions at several of Israel's scientific and academic institutes.

== Publications ==
- Salt Mirror and Petroleum Formation

== See also ==
- List of Israel Prize recipients
