= Lisett Stuppy =

German politician (born 1988)

Member of the Landtag of Rhineland-Palatinate
- Incumbent
- Assumed office 18 May 2021

Personal details
- Born: 7 January 1988 (age 38)
- Party: Alliance 90/The Greens (since 2004)

Lisett Stuppy (born 7 January 1988) is a German politician serving as a member of the Landtag of Rhineland-Palatinate since 2021. She has served as group leader of Alliance 90/The Greens in the district council of the Donnersbergkreis since 2019.
