= 1987 in German television =

This is a list of German television related events from 1987.

== Events ==
- 26 March - Wind are selected to represent Germany at the 1987 Eurovision Song Contest with their song "Laß die Sonne in dein Herz". They are selected to be the thirty-second German Eurovision entry during Ein Lied für Brüssel held at the Frankenhalle in Nuremberg.

== Debuts ==
=== Domestic ===
- 29 January - Das Erbe der Guldenburgs (1987–1990) (ZDF)
- 10 February - Der Landarzt (1987–2013) (ZDF)
- 3 March - Hans im Glück (1987) (ARD)
- 21 June - Jokehnen (1987) (ZDF)
- 9 July - Stahlkammer Zürich (1987–1991) (ARD)
- 26 August - Sommer in Lesmona (1987) (ARD)
- 6 October - Praxis Bülowbogen (1987–1996) (ARD)
- 25 December - Anna (1987) (ZDF)

=== International ===
- 5 February - (United States) The Cosby Show (1984-1992) (ZDF)
- 29 August - (United States) MacGyver (1985-1992) (Sat. 1)
- 20 September - (United States) Muppet Babies (1984-1991) (ZDF)

== Military Television Debuts ==
=== BFBS ===
- 3 February - (United Kingdom) The Children of Green Knowe (1987)
- 26 February - (United Kingdom) Creepy Crawlies (1987-1989)
- 4 May - (United Kingdom) The Secret World of Polly Flint (1987)
- 18 May - (United Kingdom) The Adventures of Spot (1987-1993)
- 7 July - (United Kingdom) Fat Tulip Too (1987)
- 20 July - (United Kingdom) The Eye of the Dragon (1987)
- 25 August - (United Kingdom) The Honey Siege (1987)
- 13 September - (United Kingdom) Inspector Morse (1987-2000)
- 25 October - (United Kingdom) The New Statesman (1987-1994)
- 28 October - (United Kingdom) Bad Boyes (1987-1988)
- 27 November - (United Kingdom) Pulaski (1987)
- 16 December - (United Kingdom) The Gemini Factor (1987)

== Changes of network affiliation ==
=== Military broadcasting ===
Title	Original Country	Former Network	New Network	Date
ALF	United States	Armed Forces Network	BFBS	1987

== Television shows ==
=== 1950s ===
- Tagesschau (1952–present)

=== 1960s ===
- heute (1963–present)

=== 1970s ===
- heute-journal (1978–present)
- Tagesthemen (1978–present)

=== 1980s ===
- Wetten, dass..? (1981-2014)
- Lindenstraße (1985–present)

== Networks and services ==
=== Launches ===
Network	Type	Launch date	Notes	Source
ARD 1 Plus	Cable television	29 March		

=== Closures ===
Network	Type	End date	Notes	Sources
Europa TV	Cable television	29 November		
