= 1988 in German television =

This is a list of German television related events from 1988.

== Events ==
- 31 March - Maxi & Chris Garden are selected to represent Germany at the 1988 Eurovision Song Contest with their song "Lied für einen Freund". They are selected to be the thirty-third German Eurovision entry during Ein Lied für Dublin held at the Frankenhalle in Nuremberg.

== Debuts ==
=== Domestic ===
- 27 March - Heimatmuseum (1988) (ARD)
- 3 October - Oh Gott, Herr Pfarrer (1988–1989) (ARD)
- 31 October - Die Bertinis (1988) (ZDF)
- 18 December - Wilder Westen inclusive (1988) (ARD)

=== International ===
- 3 January - (France) / (United States) / (Canada) Inspector Gadget (1983–1986) (RTLplus)
- 9 January - (United States) Knots Landing (1979–1993) (ZDF)
- 12 March - (United Kingdom) Dempsey and Makepeace (1985–1986) (Bayern 3)
- 27 March - (Canada) The Kids of Degrassi Street (1979–1986) (ZDF)
- 20 June - (United States) Disney's Adventures of the Gummi Bears (1985–1991) (Das Erste)

=== BFBS ===
- 5 February - (United Kingdom) Aliens in the Family (1987)
- 25 July - (United Kingdom) Kellyvision (1988)
- 7 October - (United Kingdom) Small World (1988)
- 8 October - (United States) Defenders of the Earth (1986–1987)
- 15 October - (United Kingdom) Strange Interlude (1988)
- 18 October - (United Kingdom) / (United States) Jim Henson's Mother Goose Stories (1988)
- 19 October - (United Kingdom) The Return of Shelley (1988–1992)
- 21 October - (United Kingdom) A Piece of Cake (1988)
- 21 November - (United Kingdom) The River (1988)
- 28 December - (United Kingdom) The Watch House (1988)
- (United Kingdom) Count Duckula (1988–1993)
- (United Kingdom) Chatterbox (1988)
- (United Kingdom) Tube Mice (1988)
- (New Zealand) Steel Riders (1987)
- (United Kingdom) The Snow Spider (1988)

== Television shows ==
=== 1950s ===
- Tagesschau (1952–present)

=== 1960s ===
- heute (1963–present)

=== 1970s ===
- heute-journal (1978–present)
- Tagesthemen (1978–present)

=== 1980s ===
- Wetten, dass..? (1981–2014)
- Lindenstraße (1985–present)

== Networks and services ==
=== Launches ===
Network	Type	Launch date	Notes	Source
Tele 5	Cable television	11 January		

=== Conversions and rebrandings ===
Old network name	New network name	Type	Conversion Date	Notes	Source
		Cable and satellite			

=== Closures ===
Network	Type	End date	Notes	Sources
musicbox	Cable television	11 January		

== Births ==
- February 29 - Lena Gercke, German fashion model and television host
