= Franz Riegel =

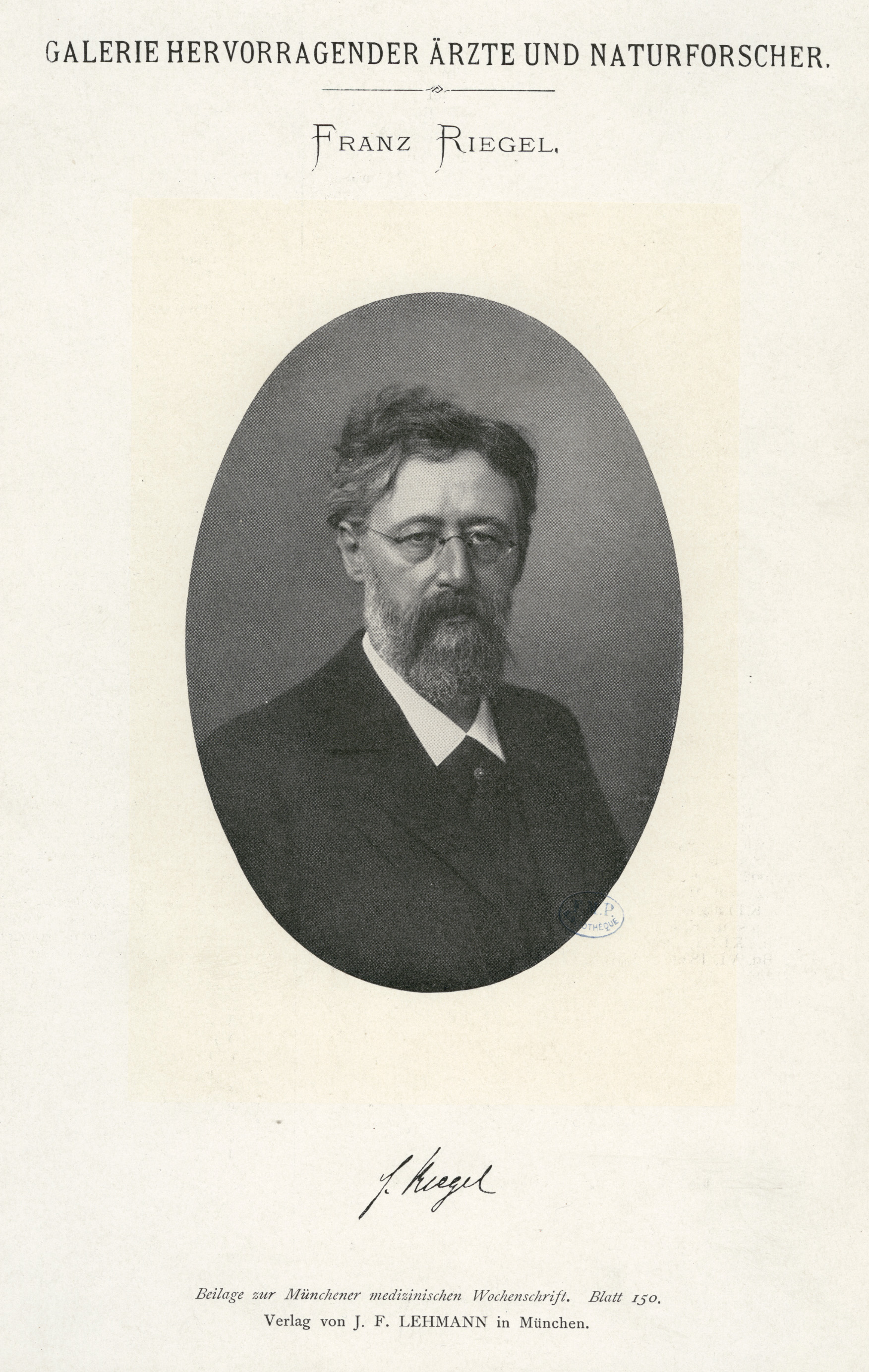
Franz Riegel

Franz Riegel (9 February 1843 – 26 August 1904) was a German internist and gastroenterologist, who was a native of Brückenau.

He studied medicine at the University of Würzburg, and following graduation, he furthered his studies in Vienna with Johann von Oppolzer (1808–1871). Afterwards, he returned to Würzburg as an assistant to Heinrich von Bamberger (1822–1888), and later Carl Gerhardt (1833–1902). In 1871, he was a lecturer of experimental pathology at the University of Würzburg, and in 1874, he became director of the Cologne city hospital. In 1879, he was appointed to the chair of medicine at the University of Giessen, where he would remain until his death in 1904.

Riegel's research involved studies of the respiratory system, vasomotor influences, the effects of substances such as caffeine, atropine and jaborandi, conditions of the heart and blood pressure in nephritis, et al. He is remembered for his extensive research of gastric disorders; his last written work discussing distinctions between hyperacidity and hypersecretion.

His best known written work was Die Erkrankungen des Magens (1896), ("Diseases of the stomach"), a book that was later translated into English.

== Associated eponym ==
- "Riegel's pulse": A pulse that diminishes in volume during expiration.
