= Elsbeth Plehn =

German contralto

Elsbeth Plehn (7 March 1922 – 13 December 2001) was a German operatic contralto and voice teacher.

== Life and career ==
Plehn studied school music and music education at the University of Königsberg. In Dresden, she took singing lessons with Herbert Winkler and Martin Flämig. She was successful as a concert and oratorium singer.

In 1959, she became a lecturer at the Hochschule für Musik Carl Maria von Weber and was appointed professor in 1975.

Among her students were the bass baritone Peter Olesch, the mezzo-soprano Annelott Damm, the soprano Carola Nossek, the voice teachers Christiane Junghanns and Christiane Bach-Röhr and the director Michael Heinicke.
