= Swantje Schendel =

German politician (born 1988)

Member of the Landtag of Lower Saxony
- Incumbent
- Assumed office 8 November 2022

Personal details
- Born: 5 April 1988 (age 38)
- Party: Alliance 90/The Greens (since 2021)

Swantje Schendel (born 5 April 1988) is a German politician serving as a member of the Landtag of Lower Saxony since 2022. She is the deputy chairwoman of the Social Affairs, Labor, Health and Equality Committee.
