= 1989 Mount Carmel forest fire =

1989 forest fire in northern Israel

Coordinates: 32.758695°N 35.008707°E

Mount Carmel Forest Fire
- Date: September 19, 1989 – September 22, 1989
- Location: Mount Carmel, Israel

Statistics
- Burned area: Over 6,000 dunams (600 ha; 1,500 acres)

The Mount Carmel Forest Fire was a forest fire that occurred between 19 and 22 September 1989 on Mount Carmel in northern Israel and was one of the largest forest fires in Israel, the largest being the 2010 Mount Carmel forest fire.

The fire extended over 6,000 dunams (600 ha; 1,500 acres), of which 3,200 dunams (320 ha; 790 acres) were natural forest areas of Aleppo pine which were part of the Carmel National Park and Nature Reserve, causing considerable damage to the flora and wildlife.

== Causes ==
The weather conditions at the start of the fire were a 31 degrees Celsius (87.8 degrees Fahrenheit), 28% humidity and eastern winds of 42–50 kmh (30–35 mph). The weather conditions and mountainous topography of the area increased both the speed at which the fire spread and its intensity, making it difficult to extinguish.

== Extinguishing the fire ==
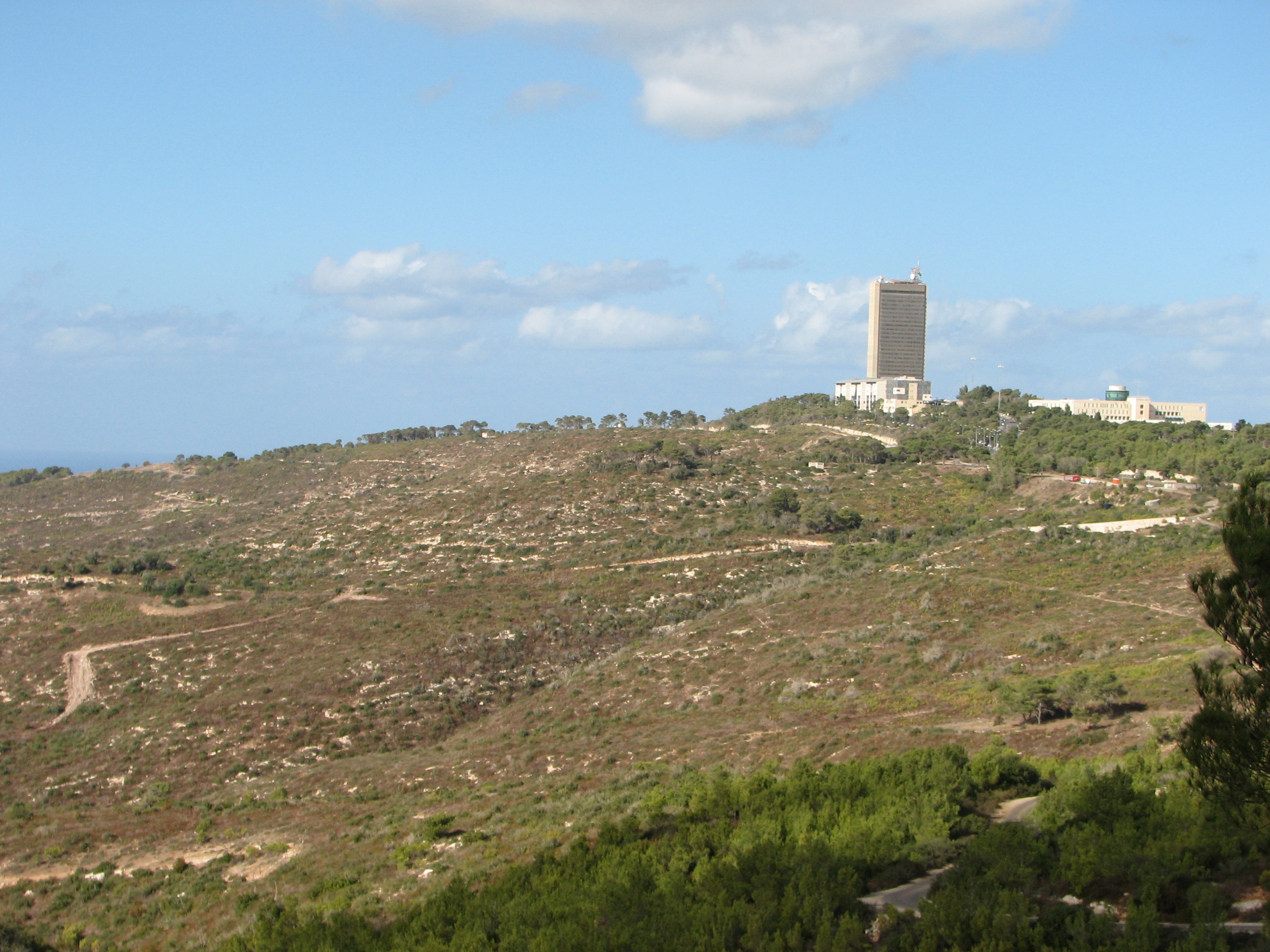
The area west of the University of Haifa which burnt up in the 1989 Mount Carmel forest fire, as seen in December 2010

The fire broke out around 11:00 a.m. on the morning of 19 September 1989 in a number of locations far apart from each other. The eruption of the fire in multiple locations led many to suspect that the fire was a result of arson, although such suspicions were never confirmed. Initially the fire spread west towards the Denia neighbourhood of Haifa and the University of Haifa. Later, when the wind direction changed at night time, the fire moved southwest towards the "Little Switzerland" area (so called for its resemblance to the landscapes of Switzerland) in the Carmel National Park, Kibbutz Beit Oren and the Damun prison facility, completely destroying nearby breeding and reacclimation centers. In the evening of September 20 the fire's intensity finally decreased significantly and was gradually extinguished, the fire finally put out on September 22.

142 firefighters of the Israel Fire and Rescue Services took part in the event using 64 fire trucks. They were assisted by 250 IDF soldiers, agricultural aircraft, volunteers of the Jewish National Fund and the Israel Nature and Parks Authority, as well as police, Municipality of Haifa and MDA forces. Most of the extinguishing operations focused on stabilizing the fire and preventing it from spreading further.

== Environmental and property damage ==
Six firefighters and several volunteers were injured in the fire, although the main damage was caused to the ecosystem. About 3200 dunam (790 acres) were of natural forest areas, which caused considerable damage to the flora and wild life. The fire killed a significant portion of the animals who used to live in the region. A herd of roe deer perished completely in the flames as did 18 wild goats. In addition, some reptiles such as turtles failed to escape the fire.

== See also ==
- 2010 Mount Carmel forest fire
- List of forests in Israel
