= Ernst Wellmann =

- Born: 14 January 1904; Szamotuły Samter
- Died: 17 July 1970 (aged 66)
- Military career
- Allegiance: Nazi Germany; West Germany
- Branch: German Army
- Service years: 1935–45; 1956–60
- Rank: Oberst (Wehrmacht); Brigadegeneral (Bundeswehr)
- Commands: Panzer Division Holstein
- Conflicts: World War II
- Awards: Knight's Cross of the Iron Cross with Oak Leaves
- Other work: Police officer

Ernst Wellmann (14 January 1904 – 17 July 1970) was an officer in the Wehrmacht of Nazi Germany during World War II. He was a recipient of the Knight's Cross of the Iron Cross with Oak Leaves.

== Awards and decorations ==
- Iron Cross (1939) 2nd Class (20 September 1939) & 1st Class (21 October 1939)
- German Cross in Gold on 8 June 1942 as Major in the I./Schützen-Regiment 3
- Knight's Cross of the Iron Cross with Oak Leaves
  - Knight's Cross on 2 September 1942 as Oberstleutnant and commander of I./Panzergrenadier-Regiment 3
  - 342nd Oak Leaves on 30 November 1943 as Oberstleutnant and commander of Panzergrenadier-Regiment 3
