= Carl August Wilhelm Schwacke =

German botanist, explorer and naturalist

Carl August Wilhelm Schwacke (1848–1904) was a German botanist, explorer and naturalist.

Born at Alfeld, near Hannover, Germany, Schwacke studied Natural Sciences at the University of Göttingen and Bonn, specializing in botany after graduation. He emigrated to Brazil in 1873 and in March 1874 he was hired as a travelling naturalist ("Naturalista viajante") by the botanical department of the National Museum of Rio de Janeiro. He travelled all over the country, beginning in 1877, assembling a rich collection of plants. In 1891 he left the National Museum and accepted a post as professor of botany at the School of Pharmacy of Ouro Preto, in Ouro Preto (Minas Gerais), where he remained until his death. In the same year he arrived at the School, he was appointed its dean. With the help of students, in numerous botanical excursions he introduced into the course as a regular activity, Schwacke was able to found a herbarium in 1892. It still exists today, with more than 30,000 specimens. In 1986 his collection was incorporated into the central herbarium (organized by José Badini) at the Federal University of Ouro Preto.

His contributions to botany were mainly taxonomic. He created the family Amburana, among others.

Schwacke died in Barbacena, Minas Gerais, Brazil.

== Biography ==
- Ber. Deutsch. Bot. Ges., 23:12-15, 1906.
- Fl. Brasil. 1 (1): 104 - 105. 1906.
