= Manfred Aschner =

Israeli microbiologist and entomologist (1901–1989)

- מנפרד אשנר
- Born: 21 May 1901; Racibórz, Germany
- Died: 1989 (aged 87–88); Israel
- Occupations: Microbiologist, entomologist
- Awards: Israel Prize (1956)

Academic work
- Discipline: Microbiology, entomology
- Institutions: Hebrew University of Jerusalem; Technion – Israel Institute of Technology

Manfred Aschner (Hebrew: מנפרד אשנר; 21 May 1901 – 1989) was an Israeli microbiologist and entomologist. Recipient of the Israel Prize in Life Sciences. He was a professor in the Faculty of Biotechnology and Food Engineering at the Technion.

== Biography ==
=== Early life and education ===
Aschner was born in 1901 in Racibórz, then part of Germany. In 1923, he studied at the Agricultural College in Berlin (Landwirtschaftliche Hochschule Berlin), affiliated with Humboldt University. In 1924, he immigrated to Israel and worked as a pioneer. During his work, he met Professor Theodor, who invited him to join the malaria research unit in Haifa.

=== Career and Research ===
In 1926, Aschner was invited by Professor Israel Kligler to the Hebrew University and engaged in the study of insect-borne diseases. Four years later, he was awarded a doctorate by the University of Breslau in Germany for his thesis on the symbiont-host relationships between bacteria and flies of the Puppipara group. He then joined the Department of Hygiene and Bacteriology at the Hebrew University and lived in the Neve Yaakov settlement.

In 1934, he and Dr. Kligler researched the possibility of vaccinating animals against typhus. In 1945, he was promoted to lecturer.

During the armistice of the War of Independence, Aschner volunteered for the Science Corps ("Hemed") and worked with other scientists on preparing vaccines against typhus. During this period, he lived with his family in Tel Aviv due to his work and the evacuation of Neve Yaakov. In 1950, Aschner returned to Jerusalem and worked as a lecturer at the medical school. With the establishment of the Faculty of Food and Biotechnology Engineering at the Technion in 1956, Professor Aschner joined the faculty and moved to Haifa.

In the same year, he was awarded the Israel Prize in Life Sciences for his contributions to the study of life sciences, including his research on the systematics of microorganisms and the discovery of the cause of fish mortality in fishponds. He did not attend the award ceremony and requested to donate the prize to the Magen Fund.

Professor Aschner's research areas included various fields of microbiology, including microbial ecology and biochemical processes. Along with Professor Carl Reich and others, he discovered a new species of algae (Prymnesium parvum) in 1946 and identified it as the cause of fish mortality in fishponds. Together with his research partners, Aschner found a way to limit the growth of the algae.

=== Later life and legacy ===
In 1970, he retired and was named professor emeritus. In 1973, he retired from active research to care for his sick wife. In 1977, he participated in the World Energy Conference in Istanbul.

== Awards ==
- In 1956, Aschner was awarded the Israel Prize, for the life sciences.

== See also ==
- List of Israel Prize recipients
- Aschner
