= Milivoj Ašner =

Croatian police chief and war criminal (1913–2011)

Đuro Milivoj Ašner
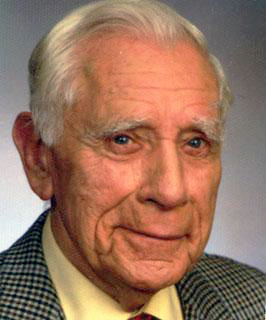
- Born: 21 April 1913; Daruvar, Croatia-Slavonia, Austria-Hungary
- Died: 14 June 2011 (aged 98); Klagenfurt, Austria
- Other name: Georg Aschner
- Occupation: Police officer
- Years active: 1941–1945
- Known for: Accused for expulsion and deportation of hundreds of Serbs, Jews and Gypsies

Đuro Milivoj Ašner (21 April 1913 – 14 June 2011) was a police chief in the Independent State of Croatia who was accused of enforcing racist laws under the Nazi-allied Ustaše regime and expulsion and deportation of hundreds of Serbs, Jews and Romani. He was 4th on the Simon Wiesenthal Center's list of last surviving people suspected of participation in Nazi war crimes and on the Interpol's most wanted list also.

Ašner stated that the deportations of Serbs to Serbia occurred, but denied there was any deportations to the camps, as he stated, "such moves would be expensive, as one must feed and restrain the prisoners."

== Life ==
Ašner was born in Daruvar, in the Kingdom of Croatia-Slavonia, which was then part of the Austro-Hungarian Empire. After the establishment of the Independent State of Croatia in 1941, he became chief of police in Požega. After the collapse of the Independent State of Croatia Ašner retreated towards Austria, where he took a new name, Georg Aschner.

In 1961, Ašner became the president of the newly established Klagenfurt branch of the Croatian Peasant Party (HSS), and organised commemorations for the Bleiburg repatriations in the name of the HSS.

In 1992, after Croatia declared itself independent, Ašner returned to Croatia, living in Požega until 2004 when Alen Budaj, a historian and associate of the Israeli Simon Wiesenthal Centre located him there. That same year, the director of the centre, Efraim Zuroff, brought the documents on Ašner to the Croatian Prosecutor's Office. Ašner fled to Austria. In 2005, the Republic of Croatia accused him of crimes against civilians and asked for his extradition from Austria.

In 2008, Austria refused because Ašner suffered from severe dementia and unfit to stand trial.

== Efforts to prosecute ==
In 2005, Croatia indicted Ašner for crimes against humanity and war crimes in the city of Požega in 1941–42. In February 2006, Austrian judicial officials said they were close to deciding on whether to arrest Ašner. Austrian officials initially ruled he could not be handed over to Croatian authorities as he held Austrian citizenship.

He remained on Interpol's most wanted list, and was considered by the Simon Wiesenthal Center as the fourth most wanted Nazi at large.

In June 2008, the then controversial Governor of Carinthia, Jörg Haider, praised Ašner's family as friendly and said of Ašner that "he's lived peacefully among us for years, and he should be able to live out the twilight of his life with us". This provoked further criticism, with Efraim Zuroff of the Simon Wiesenthal Center saying that Haider's views reflected "the political atmosphere which exists in Austria and which in certain circles is extremely sympathetic to suspected Nazi war criminals".

In an interview that aired in Croatia on 19 June 2008, Ašner acknowledged that he was involved in deportations, but maintained that those who were deported were taken not to death camps, as is generally believed, but to their homelands instead. He claimed his conscience was clear and that he was willing to go on trial in Croatia, but also asserted that his health was a problem. In an examination in the same week, it was again decided he was mentally unfit. Zuroff expressed the suspicion that Ašner was pretending or exaggerating regarding his condition.

== Death ==
Ašner died on 14 June 2011 in his room in a Caritas nursing home in Klagenfurt. His death was announced on 20 June 2011.
