= Oskar von Truppel =

German naval officer (1854–1931)

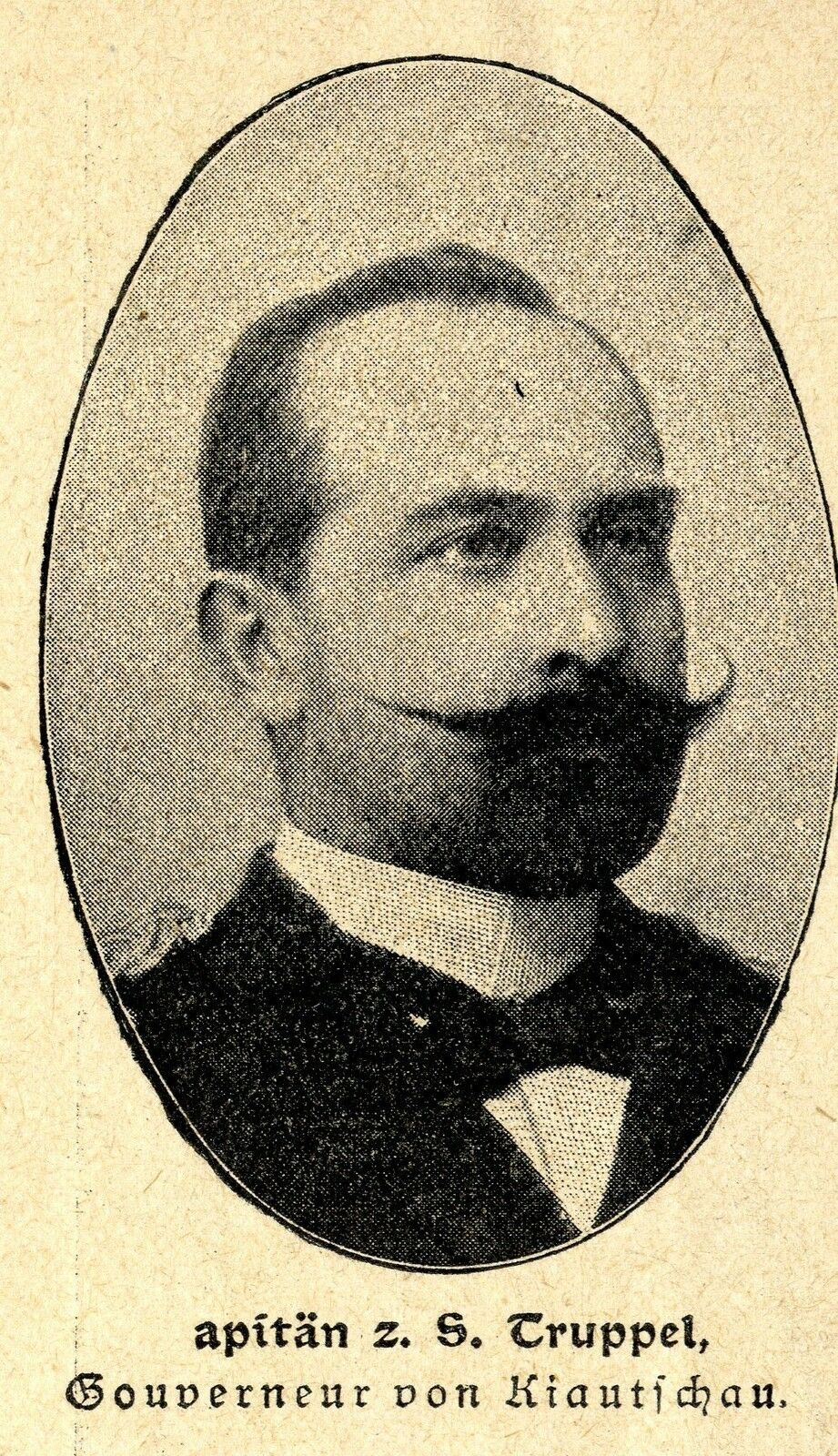
- Truppel c. 1901–1902
- Born: Oskar von Truppel; May 17, 1854; Katzhütte
- Died: August 20, 1931 (aged 77); Berlin-Frohnau
- Spouse: Anna Müller-Sauvalle
- Children: 3
- Military career
- Allegiance: German Empire
- Branch: Imperial German Navy
- Service years: 1871–1911
- Rank: Vice admiral
- Commands: SMS Prinzess Wilhelm
- Other work: Governor of the Kiautschou Bay Leased Territory (1901–1911)

Oskar Truppel, from 1911 von Truppel (Katzhütte, 17 May 1854 – Berlin-Frohnau, 20 August 1931) was a vice admiral in the Imperial German Navy. He was the governor of the Kiautschou Bay Leased Territory from 8 June 1901 to 19 August 1911.

== Biography ==
Truppel was the son of pastor Johann Christian Truppel and Bertha Schwartz. He became an orphan at the age of six. He first attended Gymnasium in Rudolstadt before joining the Imperial German Navy as a cadet on 31 May 1871, where he held a variety of tasks and positions, both on land and at sea, until 1886. He had sailed almost all waters, was both a torpedo division commander and an artillery instructor and had also taught at the Naval Academy. In August and September 1888, while holding the rank of Kapitänleutnant (Captain Lieutenant), Truppel commanded the armored gunboat SMS Viper.

In 1891 he married Anna Müller-Sauvalle in Bremen, with whom he had two sons and a daughter. From 1894 to 1897, Truppel was a department head at the Naval High Command.

His career in the German colony of Kiautschou in Qing China began in December 1897, when Truppel was given command of the protected cruiser SMS Prinzess Wilhelm, which was then operating off Tsingtao. On board the Darmstadt and accompanied by the III. Seebataillon, he finally landed at Tsingtau at the end of January 1898 and was interim commanding officer there from 11 February to 15 April. At that time he was frigate captain with the rank of lieutenant colonel. After the arrival of the first governor Carl Rosendahl in Tsingtau, Truppel commanded the Prinzess Wilhelm in East Asian waters until 1899. In July 1899 he took over a department in the Naval Office in Berlin, but on 20 February 1901 he was appointed third governor of Kiautschou. Truppel took over the office on 8 June 1901 with the rank of captain at sea. Although this was generally seen as a good decision, it also had to do with luck. The previous governor Paul Jaeschke had died of typhoid fever in January 1901 and Maz Rollmann was only his provisional successor. Under Truppel, Kiautschou grew into a "model colony". His chief of staff from 1902 to the summer of 1906 was the later vice admiral Felix Funke, then lieutenant captain, later frigate captain Ehler Behring. Truppel promoted industry and the construction of new buildings (including the government building and the police station). In addition, new living space had to be created quickly for the Chinese attracted by the flourishing city of Tsingtau. Truppel was promoted to rear admiral in 1905 and lived in his residence, which was completed in the same year and is now a tourist attraction. In 1907 he was promoted to vice admiral.

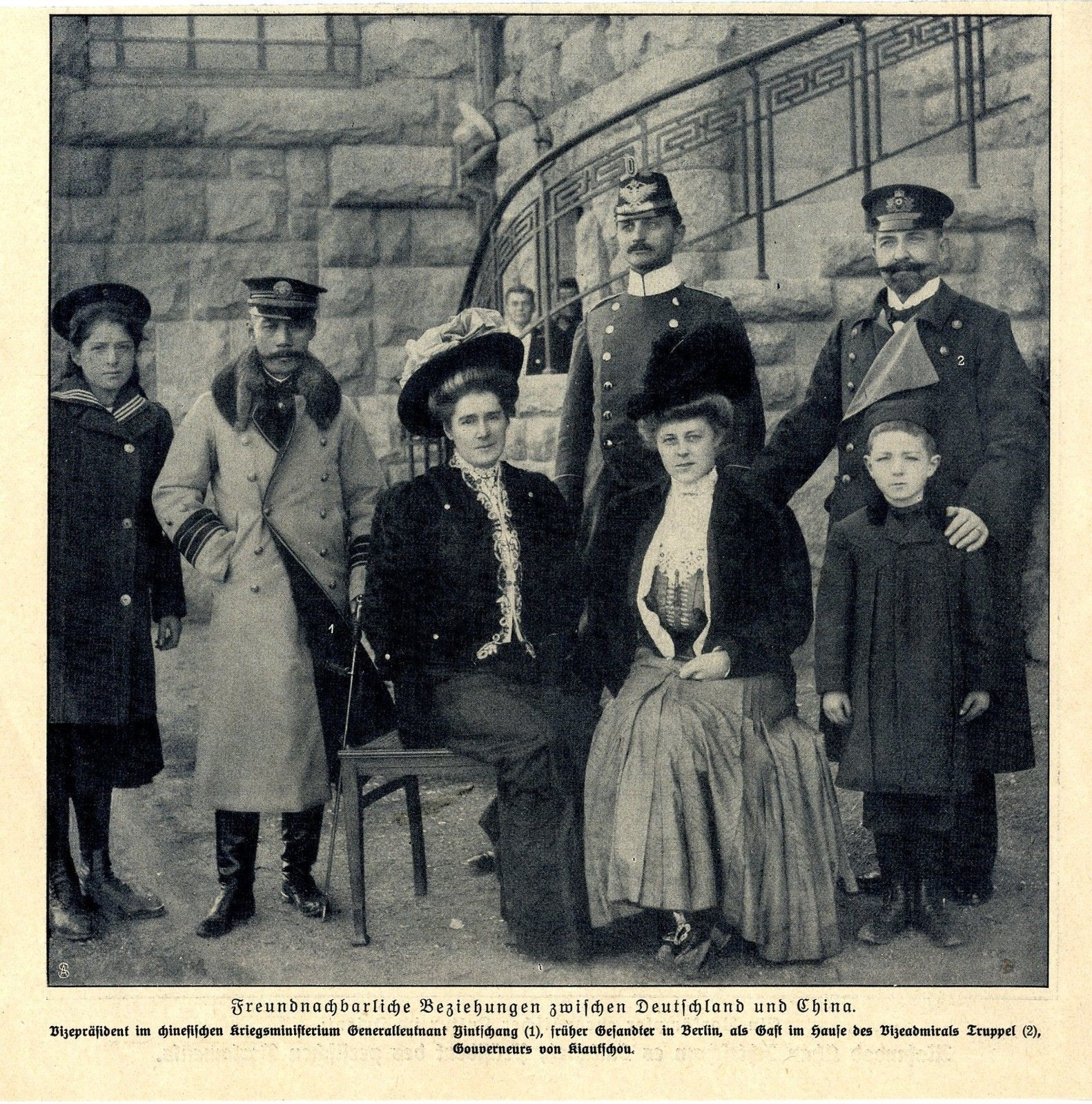
Truppel in Kiautschou

Truppel's head of administration in the Naval Office, Grand Admiral Alfred von Tirpitz, wrote the following about Truppel's character and his administration in China in 1907:

Promotes the development of the protected area. Energetic in all investigations of a political and economic nature, he sometimes forgets the necessary consideration of the financial situation and financial regulations of the empire (...). Vice Admiral Truppel is not free from vanity.

In 1911, Truppel unexpectedly resigned from his post at his own request, and just a few months after his appointment as admiral, he and his family embarked on the armored cruiser SMS Gneisenau. After his return to Germany, Truppel was raised to hereditary nobility by German Emperor Wilhelm II on 19 August 1911 and at the same time transferred to the reserve.

He initially taught again at the Naval Academy, but moved with his family a short time later to Berlin and died there in 1931.

== Bibliography ==
- (in German) Dermot Bradley (Hrsg.), Hans H. Hildebrand, Ernest Henriot: Deutschlands Admirale 1849–1945. Die militärischen Werdegänge der See-, Ingenieur-, Sanitäts-, Waffen- und Verwaltungsoffiziere im Admiralsrang. Band 3: P–Z. Biblio Verlag. Osnabrück 1990. ISBN 3-7648-1700-3. S. 469–470.
- (in German) Hans-Martin Hinz, Christoph Lind (Hrsg.): Tsingtau. Ein Kapitel deutscher Kolonialgeschichte 1897–1914. Deutsches Historisches Museum u. a., Berlin 1998, ISBN 3-86102-100-5, online.

Government offices
Preceded by Max Rollmann; Acting	Governor of the Kiautschou Bay Leased Territory; 1901–1911	Succeeded by Wilhelm Höpfner; Acting
