= 2002 in Germany =

- Decades: 1980s; 1990s; 2000s; 2010s; 2020s
- See also: Other events of 2002; History of Germany; Timeline; Years

The following is a list of events from the year 2002 in Germany.

== Incumbents ==
- President – Johannes Rau
- Chancellor – Gerhard Schröder

== Events ==
- 1 January – The Euro Currency officially became the legal tender for Germany, along with the other European Union (EU) Eurozone member area countries, replacing the Deutsche Mark by being introduced physically with the official launch of the currency coins and banknotes. 6–17 February – 52nd Berlin International Film Festival
- 22 February – Germany in the Eurovision Song Contest 2002
- 26 April – Erfurt massacre
- 17 May – Legoland Germany opens.
- 8 June–15 September – Documenta11
- 30 June – The Völkerstrafgesetzbuch goes into effect.
- 1 July – Überlingen mid-air collision
- 10 July – Swiss International Air Lines Flight 850
- 13 July – Murder of Marinus Schöberl
- August – 2002 European floods
- 22 October – The Second Schröder cabinet led by Gerhard Schröder was sworn in.
- 16 December – The European Union and NATO adopt a joint declaration that forms the basis for the Berlin Plus arrangements.
- Date unknown
  - German construction company Philipp Holzmann is defunct.
  - Hammer Klavier Trio, a jazz trio from Hamburg is founded.
  - NanoAndMore, a nanotechnology distributor is founded.

== Elections ==
- 2002 German federal election
- 2002 Mecklenburg-Vorpommern state election
- 2002 Saxony-Anhalt state election

== Births ==
- 26 October – Emma Schweiger, actress

== Deaths ==
- 27 January – Franz Meyers, German politician (b. 1908)
- 1 February – Hildegard Knef, German actress (b. 1925)
- 8 February – Joachim Hoffmann, German historian (b. 1930)
- 11 March
  - Marion Dönhoff, German journalist (b. 1909)
  - Rudolf Hell, German inventor (b. 1901)
- 13 March – Hans-Georg Gadamer, German philosopher (b. 1900)
- 3 April – Heinz Drache, German actor (b. 1923)
- 6 April – Martin Sperr, German dramatist and actor (b. 1944)
- 9 April – Thomas Dinger, German musician (b. 1952)
- 22 April – Albrecht Becker, German production designer, photographer, and actor (b. 1906)
- 2 May – Richard Stücklen, German politician (b. 1916)
- 4 May – Rolf Friedemann Pauls, German diplomat (b. 1915)
- 2 June – Konrad Wirnhier, German sport shooter (b. 1937)
- 13 June – John Herberger, German football player and coach (b. 1919)
- 17 June – Fritz Walter, German football player (b. 1920)
- 24 June – Frank Ripploh, German actor and film director (b. 1949)
- 29 June – Alfred Dregger, German politician (b. 1920)
- 13 July – Marinus Schöberl, German murder victim (b. 1985)
- 25 July – Johannes Joachim Degenhardt, Archbishop of Paderborn (b. 1926)
- 30 August – Horst Wendlandt, German film director (b. 1922)
- 14 October – Norbert Schultze, German film composer (b. 1911)
- 23 October – Marianne Hoppe, German actress (b. 1909)
- 7 November – Rudolf Augstein, German journalist (b. 1923)
- 3 December – Klaus Löwitsch, German actor (b. 1936)
- 6 December – Gerhard Löwenthal, German journalist (b. 1922)
- 31 December – Jürgen Dethloff, German engineer (b. 1924)

== See also ==
- 2002 in German television
