= Soquelec =

- Type: Private
- Industry: Scientific equipment
- Founded: 1974
- Headquarters: Montreal, Canada
- Area served: Canada
- Key people: Marc Slakmon; President
- Website: www.soquelec.com

Soquelec (French: société québécoise d'électronique) Limited is a Montreal-based company that focuses on sales and service of scientific equipment for applications in materials and life sciences. It is the Canadian distributor of digital imaging technology and accessories, such as Electron Microscopy, Atomic Force Microscopy, X-Ray scanning and sample preparation. It is also a provider of laboratory consumables. Its sister company, Soquelec Telecommunications, specializes in the distribution of RF, microwave and millimeter-wave telecommunication components.

== History ==
Soquelec was founded in 1974 by Jean-Pierre and Yette Slakmon. It has continuously operated in the Canadian market and has been involved in the installation of over 200 electron optical systems in universities, hospitals and private companies.

Upon the death of its founder in 2015 the management of the company has passed on to Jean-Pierre's son Marc.

For over 35 years, Soquelec has been the exclusive distributor of JEOL (Japan Electron Optics Laboratory) in Canada, except between 2016 and 2021, when it distributed TESCAN products.

== Representation ==
As of April 2024 Soquelec is the Canadian distributor of the following manufacturers:

- Agar Scientific (Consumables, accessories and specialist equipment for types of microscopy)
- Annealsys (RTP and CVD)
- Bruker (limited to some x-ray products)
- Gatan (CCD cameras, image filters, TEM sample holders, sample preparation equipment)
- Haskris (water chillers)
- IDES (time-resolved TEM), now a subsidiary of JEOL
- JEOL (electron microscopes)
- KUBTEC Scientific (Cabinet X-ray irradiators and imagers)
- Nanosensors (AFM tips)
- NanoWorld (AFM tips)
- Protochips (In-situ Electron Microscopy equipment and consumables)
- Quorum (EM sample preparation and cryo equipment)
- RMC Boekeler (Ultramicrotomes and EM sample preparation equipment)
- Spectral Instruments Imaging (In-vivo Optical and X-ray Imagers), now a subsidiary of Bruker
