= NanoAndMore =

- Company type: Private
- Industry: Nanotechnology
- Founded: 2002 (Europe), 2005 (USA), 2019 (Japan)
- Headquarters: Wetzlar, Germany; Watsonville, California, USA; Misato, Japan
- Number of locations: 3
- Area served: North America, South America, Europe, Japan
- Key people: Peter Besmens (CEO); Nicholas Schacher (CEO); Nobuhiro Saito (Representative Director)
- Products: AFM Probes from NanoWorld; Nanosensors; BudgetSensors; MikroMasch; Opus sQube nanotools
- Owner: NanoWorld Holding AG, Switzerland
- Subsidiaries: NanoAndMore GmbH, Germany; NanoAndMore USA Inc., USA; Nano And More Japan Co., Ltd., Japan
- Website: www.nanoandmore.com,www.nanoandmore.jp

NanoAndMore is a distributor for AFM cantilevers from NanoWorld, Nanosensors, BudgetSensors, MikroMasch, Opus, sQube and nanotools, calibration standards and other products for nanotechnology.

== History ==
NanoAndMore was founded in Germany in 2002 and started operating in the US in 2005. In 2005, NanoWorld Holding AG from Schaffhausen, Switzerland, acquired and integrated NanoAndMore into the NanoWorld group composed of Nanotechnology companies. The world market leader in AFM probes, NanoWorld has appointed NanoAndMore as the official distributor for NanoWorld and Nanosensors products.

NanoAndMore GmbH is operating from a location in Wetzlar, Germany - serving the European market. NanoAndMore USA is serving the North and South American markets. From 2005 to 2015, NanoAndMore USA was operating from Lady's Island (South Carolina), United States. In 2015, NanoAndMore USA moved to Watsonville, California, United States. NanoAndMore Japan was founded in 2019 and is serving Japan and operating from Misato in Saitama.

== Products ==
AFM probes and accessories distributed by NanoAndMore are used for Atomic Force Microscopy in material science, physics, biology, life sciences and in semiconductor industry.

AFM probes sold by NanoAndMore fit all common Atomic Force Microscopes (AFM) like Asylum Research, Bruker, JPK, Molecular Imaging, Nanosurf, Veeco, WiTEK, NTMDT, Novascan, etc. As an important distributor of AFM probes it is often cited as a supplier in research papers and is therefore considered an important source of products for Atomic Force Microscopy.
