= 1985 in Germany =

- Decades: 1960s; 1970s; 1980s; 1990s; 2000s
- See also: Other events of 1985; History of Germany • Timeline • Years

Events in the year 1985 in Germany.

== Incumbents ==
- President - Richard von Weizsäcker
- Chancellor – Helmut Kohl

== Events ==
- 15–26 February - 35th Berlin International Film Festival
- 21 March - Germany in the Eurovision Song Contest 1985
- 1985 diethylene glycol wine scandal
- 8 May - Federal President Richard von Weizsäcker delivers his speech to the Bundestag on the 40th anniversary of the end of the Second World War, describing 8 May 1945 as a day of liberation. It is widely regarded as the starting point of Germany's post-war memory culture.
- The Union for Aromanian Language and Culture, an Aromanian cultural organization, is founded by the Aromanian professor Vasile Barba at Freiburg im Breisgau.

== Births ==
- January 7 - Tiger Kirchharz, German dancer
- March 23 - Felix Övermann, German rower
- March 25 - Luise Heyer, German actress
- April 8 - Patrick Schliwa, German rugby player
- April 9 - Tim Bendzko, German singer-songwriter
- April 28 - Lucas Jakubczyk, German athlete
- May 6 - Theresa Underberg, German actress
- June 1 - Prince Christian of Hanover
- June 4 - Lukas Podolski, German football player
- June 20
  - Kai Hesse, footballer
  - Halil Savran, footballer
  - Katharina Schulze, politician
- June 27 - Nico Rosberg, Formula One racing driver
- July 10 - Mario Gómez, German football player
- August 27 - Daniel Küblböck, German singer (died 2018)
- September 4 - Marinus Schöberl, German murder victim (died 2002)
- September 12 - Sascha Klein, German swimmer
- November 9 - Denise Schindler, German Paralympic cyclist
- November 15 - Claas Relotius, German journalist who admitted numerous instances of journalistic fraud
- November 18 - Melanie Behringer, German footballer
- November 21 - Nadine Müller, German athlete
- December 24 - Christina Schwanitz, German shot putter

== Deaths ==
- February 10 - Werner Hinz, German actor (born 1903)
- April 10 - Klaus Scholder, ecclesiastical historian (born 1930)
- March 29 - Gerhard Stöck, German athlete (born 1911)
- April 6 - Mark Lothar, German composer (born 1902)
- April 7 - Carl Schmitt. German jurist and political theorist (born 1888)
- May 8 - Karl Marx, German composer (born 1897)
- May 21 - Kurt Waitzmann, German actor (born 1905)
- May 25 – Herta Hammerbacher, landscape architect (born 1900)
- May 30 - Gustav Jaenecke, German ice hockey player (born 1908)
- June 29 - Walter Rudi Wand, German judge (born 1928)
- July 16 - Heinrich Böll, German writer (born 1917)
- August 2 - Karl Heinz Stroux, German actor, theatre and film director (born 1908)
- August 6 – Karl Diebitsch, German Nazi uniform designer (born 1899)
- September 22 - Axel Springer, German journalist (born 1912)
- October 2 - Alex Möller, German politician (born 1903)
- November 12 - Willi Dehnkamp, German politician (born 1903)
- December 2 - Heinz Hoffmann, German politician (born 1910)
- December 26 - Margarete Schön, German actress (born 1895)

== Links ==
Media related to 1985 in Germany at Wikimedia Commons
