= Herberger =

Herberger is a German surname. Notable people with the surname include:

- Albert J. Herberger (1931–2022), United States admiral
- John Herberger (1919–2002), German footballer and manager
- Sepp Herberger (1897–1977), German footballer and manager
- Valerius Herberger (1562–1627), German Lutheran theologian and writer

== See also ==
- Herberger's, an American department store chain
- Herberger Institute for Design and the Arts, fine arts college at Arizona State University
- Herberger Theater Center, indoor performance venue in Phoenix, Arizona
