= Johann Bernhard Merian =

Swiss philosopher (1723–1807)

Johann Bernhard Merian or Jean-Bernard Mérian (28 September 1723, Liestal – 12 February 1807, Berlin) was a Swiss philosopher active in the Prussian Academy of Sciences in Berlin. He played a significant role in introducing English philosophical thought, particularly David Hume's works, to continental Europe through his translations and commentaries.

== Life and career ==
Merian studied at the University of Basle, gaining his doctorate in 1740. Merian came to Berlin in 1750 as a member of the Berlin Academy, which was then under the presidency of Pierre-Louis Moreau de Maupertuis (who had been president since 1746). He was recommended by his Basel compatriot Johann II Bernoulli, who suggested him to Maupertuis as a young, diligent, and not too demanding candidate for the philosophical class of the Academy.

Prior to his appointment in Berlin, Merian had worked as a tutor in the Netherlands. In Berlin, he quickly integrated into the French-Reformed colony and married the eldest daughter of Charles Etienne Jordan, a confidant of Frederick II, which gave him privileged access to the court. He became a member of the Class for Speculative Philosophy of the Berlin Academy in 1750, and director of the Class for Belles-Lettres in 1771.

Merian dedicated the majority of his life to the Frederician Academy, where he remained until his death in 1807. His connections to Switzerland, England, and France positioned him as an important figure in the European Republic of Letters.

== Philosophical work ==
Merian's first contribution to the Academy dealt with the epistemological problem of self-perception (Sur l'aperception de sa propre existence, 1749), a key question that would occupy him throughout his life. He was regularly involved in selecting topics for philosophical prize questions, evaluating submissions, and publishing awarded writings.

His philosophical approach has been characterized as "eclectic" or "pragmatic", influenced by skepticism, particularly that of David Hume. While appreciating Hume's epistemology and moral philosophy, Merian maintained reservations about the consequences of skepticism, especially regarding religion.

== Molyneux problem ==
In the 1770s and 1780s, Merian became known for his work on Molyneux's problem, which concerns whether a person born blind who gains sight would be able to visually distinguish objects previously known only by touch. His papers on this topic were collected and republished in 1984 by Francine Markovits under the title Sur le problème de Molyneux.

== Critique of systematic philosophy ==
In his later years, Merian developed a critique of systematic philosophy as practiced in German universities. In his Parallèle historique de nos deux philosophies nationales (1797), he compared the Leibniz-Wolffian school with the Kantian school, analyzing their rise, totalizing claims, and consolidation in universities. He advocated for an eclectic approach to philosophy, which he considered more appropriate for an academy dedicated to free research.

== Translations and dissemination of English philosophy ==
One of Merian's most significant contributions was his translation of English philosophical works, particularly those of David Hume, into French. This began around 1755–1756 when Maupertuis encouraged him to translate Hume's "Philosophical Essays concerning Human Understanding" (later known as "An Enquiry Concerning Human Understanding").

Merian's translations included Essais philosophiques sur l'entendement humain (1758), Histoire naturelle de la religion (1759), and Dissertation sur les passions, sur la tragédie, sur la règle du goût (1759).

Through these translations, Merian helped introduce Hume's skeptical philosophy to continental Europe, making him "an important pioneer of English skeptical philosophy in Germany and its propagator in the French-speaking world".

== Literary contributions ==
Beyond philosophy, Merian also contributed to literary studies. He wrote about the history of poetry in relation to the sciences and engaged with stylistics and rhetoric. Notable among his literary works was his French translation of Claudius Claudianus's "The Rape of Proserpina" (1767). His philosophical and psychological interests, combined with a strong sense of style, characterized all his work.

== Legacy ==
When Frederick Ancillon delivered Merian's eulogy at the Academy in 1810, three years after his death, it marked the end of a French-dominated epoch in Prussian intellectual history. Merian's contributions to the reception of English philosophy in continental Europe, his work on epistemological problems, and his role at the Berlin Academy represent significant aspects of 18th-century European intellectual exchange.
