= Balkan Black Box Festival =

Cultural festival in Berlin

Balkan Black Box is the only festival of culture and art in Germany which focuses on Southeastern Europe. Between 2001 and 2008, the festival was held annually in Berlin, before being discontinued in 2009 due to declining interest and lack of funding. Over the course of one week, the festival presents films, exhibitions, literature, theatre, music and discussions from and about Southeastern Europe.

== Concept ==
The festival aims to present the culture and art of the post-socialist countries of the Balkans. That is especially because these societies are still a "black box" for Western Europe. Since the establishment of the festival in 1999 the perception of Southeastern Europe changed significantly. For this reason the festival always comes up with new questions and themes that are important in the context of the actual processes in Southeastern Europe. As the event organizers state, "balkan black box was a political festival, expressed through arts and culture." Because of its specific and unique focus, Balkan Black Box affects the whole of Germany.

== Organisation ==
The Festival is organised by an international team of people who are related to Southeastern Europe for biographical and/or professional reasons. Due to its open platform character the festival maintains a lot of cooperation with migrant communities and cultural institutions in Berlin as well as organisations in Southeastern Europe.

== Programmes 1999–2008 ==
1999: The role of the "opposition culture" in the Balkans
2000: "Black market culture" (Pula, Croatia)
2001: Independent culture between market and state
2002: "Space and time in between": Identity in changing societies
2003: "The Balkans are different": New developments in cultural production in Southeastern Europe
2004: "Evil Art. Cultural production and nationalism"
2005: "turbocultures – The Balkans between the archaic period and postmodernism"
2006: "Areas of remembering"
2008: "Balkan Bazaar Europe"

== Film Awards "Golden Black Box" ==
Since 2004 the festival awards the "Golden Black Box" for each, the best feature, documentary and short film. In 2006 new categories were established additionally: "Newcomer Award" and "Human Rights Award". The competition especially promotes critical film productions in order to encourage independent coverage.

=== Golden Black Box winners ===
- 2004: Best Documentary – Tamara Milosevic, Cement (2003)

== Background ==
Funding:
Balkan Black Box predominantly receives funding from cultural institutions in Berlin, but also from political foundations, Southeastern embassies and private donors.

Locations:

- Theatre Volksbühne Berlin
- Theatre Hebbel am Ufer
- Cultural Center "Pfefferberg"
- Art Centre Tacheles
- Cultural Centre "ACUD"
- Kino Babylon

Visitors:

The festival has more than 3,000 visitors every year.
