= Charles-Étienne Jordan =

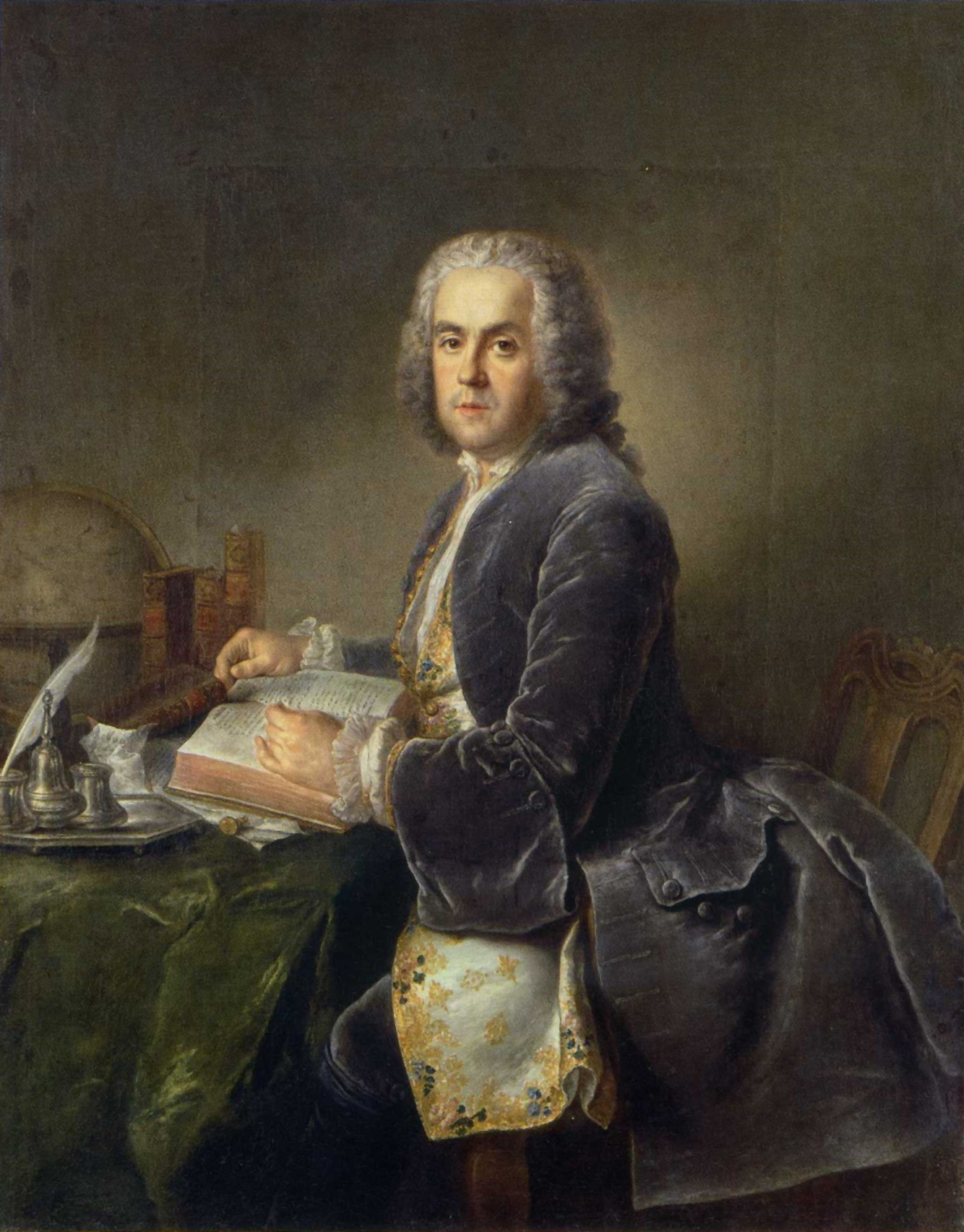
Jordan (ca. 1740, portrait by Antoine Pesne)

Charles-Étienne Jordan (1700 in Berlin – 1745) was a Prussian-born Huguenot refugee, advisor to Frederick the Great and French-language author on literature and history. He is mainly remembered for his Histoire d'un voyage litteraire (1735) describing his literary visits in France, England and the Netherlands.

In 1736 Jordan became the Crown Prince's literary secretary, in 1740 he was appointed Curator of the Universities, and in 1744 Vice President of the Prussian Academy of Sciences. At the Rheinsberg Castle he was the member of a radical intellectual circle including general Heinrich August de la Motte Fouqué. Jordan was an avid collector of banned radical and "Socinian" books, obtaining copies of the Meditationes of Theodor Ludwig Lau, Jean Bodin's Colloque, and Adrian Beverland's État de l'homme for his personal library.

== Works ==
- Recueil de littérature, de philosophie, et d'histoire, 1730
- Histoire d'un voyage litteraire fait en MDCCXXXIII en France, en Angleterre, et en Hollande, 1735
