= List of mayors of Liestal =

Coat of arms of Liestal

This is a list of mayors of Liestal, Basel-Land, Switzerland. The mayor (Stadtpräsident, earlier: Gemeindepräsident) chairs the five-member city council (Stadtrat) of Liestal.

Mayor of Liestal
Term	Mayor	Lifespan	Party	Notes
1875–1907	Johann Jakob Stutz	(1842–1913)		father of Oscar Stutz
1908–1917	César Erb	(1857–1931)		
1917–1923	Oscar Stutz	(1879–1960)		
1923–1924	Heinrich Gysin	(1848–1927)		
1924–1959	Paul Brodbeck	(1890–1959)		father of Hans Brodbeck
1959–1963	Ernst Mangold	(born 1901)		
1976–1987	Hans Brodbeck	(1920–1994)		
1987–1996	Jürg Wüthrich		SPS/PSS	
1996–2004	Marc Lüthi		FDP/PRD	
2004–2012	Regula Gysin	(born 1944)	FDP/PRD	
2012–present	Lukas Ott	(born 1966)	GPS	
