= Hammer Klavier Trio =

Jazz trio from Hamburg, Germany

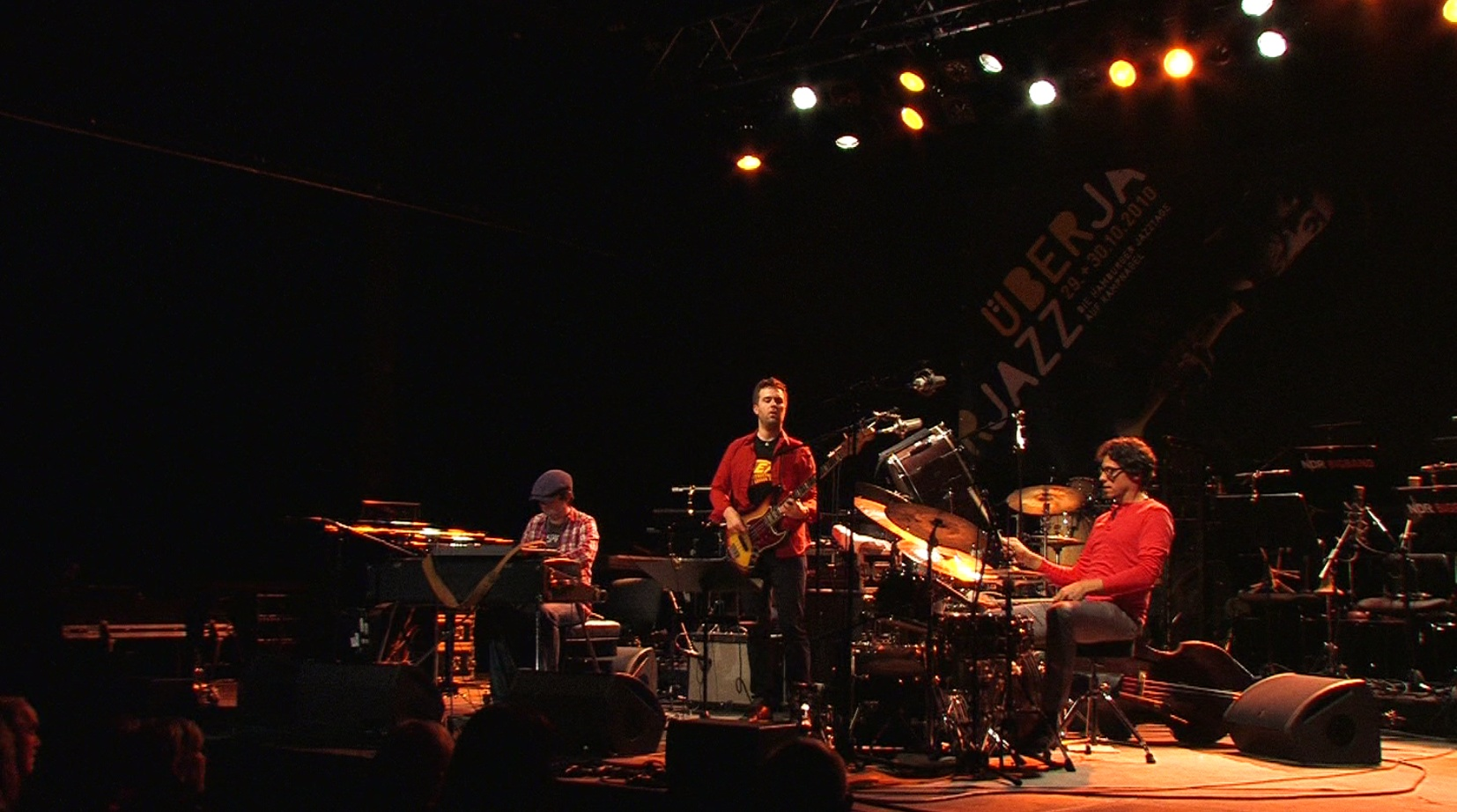
- Hammer Klavier Trio (Boris Netsvetaev, Philipp Steen, Kai Bussenius)

Background information
- Origin: Hamburg, Hamburg, Germany
- Genres: Jazz
- Years active: 2002–present
- Label: Jan Matthies Records
- Members: Boris Netsvetaev, Philipp Steen, Kai Bussenius
- Website: boris-net.com

Hammer Klavier Trio (English: Hammer piano trio) is a jazz trio from Hamburg, Germany, consisting of pianist Boris Netsvetaev, bassist Philipp Steen, and drummer Kai Bussenius.

== History ==
The Hammer Klavier Trio (HKT) was founded in 2002. Their music has been described as "straight-ahead jazz, somewhere between Thelonious Monk and The Bad Plus".

The trio plays acoustic and electric, structured and free, experimental and traditional styles.

Their debut album "Now I know who shot JFK" was published in 2008 by Altrisuoni, a Swiss jazz label.

The video of their performance at the Überjazz Jazz Festival on 30 October 2010 was nominated for the 'Video of the Year' award by the Jazz Journalists Association. The German specialized press noted the nomination as a "small sensation".

After attending the 2011 Jazz Journalists Association awards ceremony in New York City they played 5 concerts locally.

== Discography ==
- Rocket In The Pocket (2012), Jan Matthies Records
- Now I know who shot JFK (2008), Altrisuoni
