= Murder of Marinus Schöberl =

2002 child murder in Germany

Marinus Schöberl
- Born: 4 September 1985; Wolfen, East Germany
- Died: 13 July 2002 (aged 16); Potzlow, Brandenburg, Germany
- Cause of death: Murder

On 13 July 2002, Marinus Schöberl was murdered by three young right wing extremists in the Potzlow district in the Brandenburg state of Germany. The case attracted widespread media attention, and inspired theatre productions and film documentaries.

== Events ==
Marinus Schöberl was born on 4 September 1985 in Wolfen.

Schöeberl was described as a shy boy who had learning difficulties and unkempt, bleached-blonde hair. Schöberl was with two brothers Marco and Marcel S. and Sebastian F. They forced their way into the house of three villagers to continue drinking alcohol. The residents did not resist but instead went onto the veranda.

After consuming copious amounts of alcohol, Marco S. began to claim that Schöberl looked “like a Jew” because of his bleached hair and baggy trousers and asked him to say that he was one. Because Schöberl did not do this, he was beaten until he bled. A 42-year-old woman who overheard the fight told Schöberl that he should answer the question in the affirmative so that they would stop. When he did he was tortured even more as they continued beating him, feeding him a mixture of beer and liquor, and urinating on him. The prosecutor found that the perpetrators had tortured their victim for a long time and cruelly.

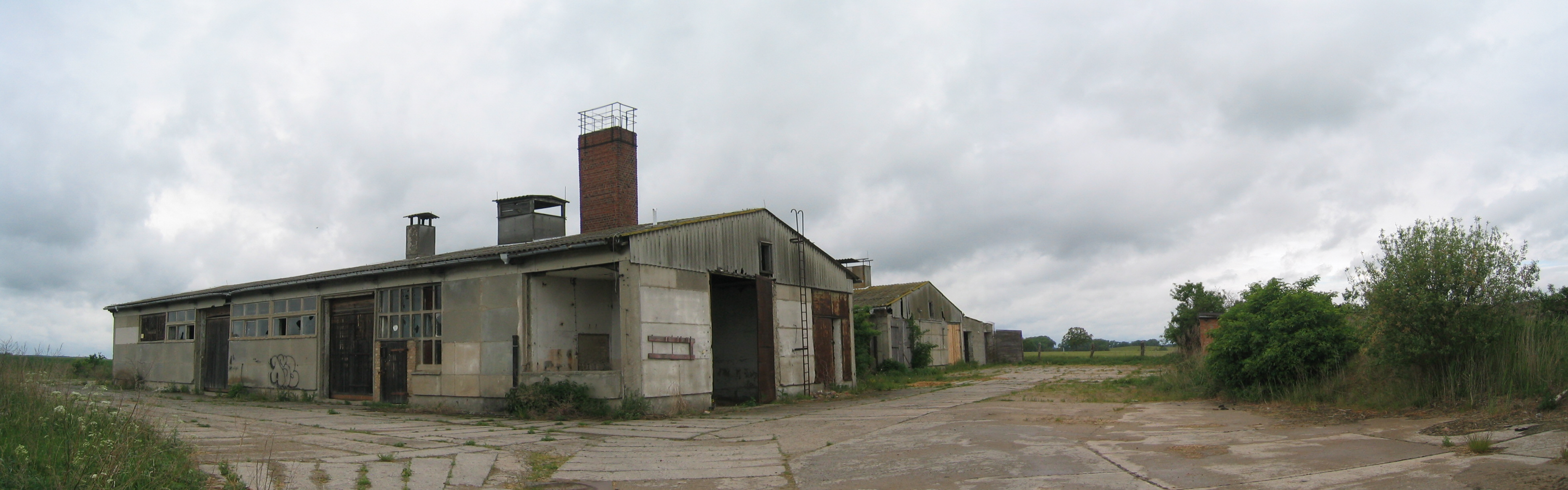
The old pig fattening facility in Potzlow (known as a Landwirtschaftliche Produktionsgenossenschaft), which was an East German agricultural cooperative

The group then went to a former LPG pig fattening plant, where they imitated a scene from the American film American History X (1998) in which a person is killed by a so-called “curb kick". They then threw Schöberl into the dry cesspool there. It was never established whether he was still alive at this point. The body remained hidden for some time in a manure pit.

The crime was solved because one of the perpetrators bragged about the crime to his peers months later.

== Trial ==
In the trial before the Neuruppin regional court on 23 October 2003, a perpetrator who was underage at the time of the crime received a two-year youth sentence and was later released from custody. In August 2004, the Federal Court of Justice in Leipzig revised the judgment. Another chamber of the Neuruppin regional court then imposed a three-year youth prison sentence on the man who was initially released.

The main perpetrator was sentenced to eight years and six months in prison. His adult brother, who had the remainder of his sentence from an earlier attack on an African, received a 15-year prison sentence for attempted murder. For both convicts, their alcoholism and a low intelligence quotient of around 55 had a mitigating effect on their sentence. It was also reported in the press that Marco S., like his victim, had a speech impediment, had been bullied in kindergarten and had only completed the seventh grade of special school.

In October 2010, the main perpetrator Marcel S. was released after eight years in prison and the remaining sentence was suspended.

== Legacy ==
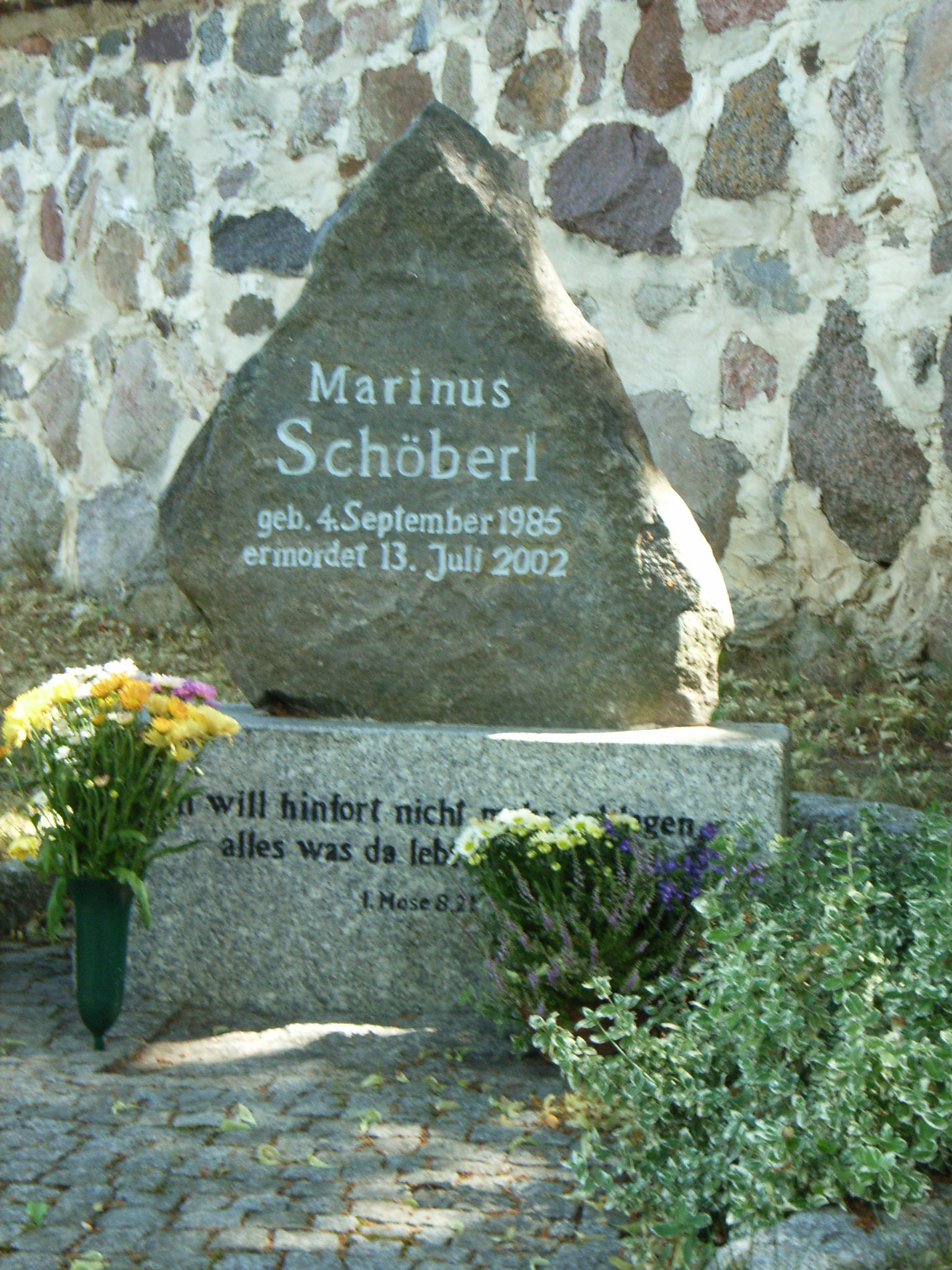
Memorial stone for Marinus Schöberl in front of the Potzlow church

On the initiative of Pastor Johannes Reimer, the community erected a memorial stone for Marinus Schöberl in front of the Potzlow church, which was donated by Berlin citizens.

== Adaptations ==
=== Theatre and radio plays ===
The events were staged by Andres Veiel in 2005 in the play Der Kick by the Berlin Maxim-Gorki-Theater in a co-production with the Theater Basel. The film of the same name was released in cinemas in September 2006. There was also a radio play. In 2007, Veiel expanded his documentary theater piece into the book Der Kick. A lesson about violence.

The South Tyrolean author Toni Bernhart also discussed the case artistically. His play Martinisommer premiered in 2006 as part of the third Tyrolean Drama Festival in the Westbahntheater, Innsbruck, in cooperation with the Theater in der Altstadt, Meran, directed by Torsten Schilling.

Toni Bernhart developed Martinisommer during the 2003 workshop days at Vienna's Burgtheater. Martinisommer was produced as a radio play by ORF (Ö1), directed by Harald Krewer. This radio play production also ran as a live radio play in Vienna's Wiener Burgtheater casino in 2006.

=== Films ===
- In the Wrong Place at the Wrong Time Documentary, 2005, 60 min., written and directed by: Tamara Milosevic, first broadcast: SWR, 27 April 2006.
- Potzlow – Geschichte X, Filmdokumentation von Jörg Jeshel und Brigitte Kramer über die Entstehung des Stücks Der Kick und die Hintergründe der Tat, 3sat, 2005
- Der Kick, film adaptation of the play; Director: Andres Veiel, 2006
- According to Wriezen, documentary, 2012, 87 min., written and directed by: Daniel Abma, premiered at DOK Leipzig in 2012, first broadcast: RBB, 11 November 2014. The film shows, among other things, how Daniel Abna portrays the main perpetrator Marcel Shis' release from the Wriezen correctional facility for three years.

== See also ==
- Neo-Nazism in Germany

== Literature ==
- Andres Veiel: Der Kick. Ein Lehrstück über Gewalt. DVA, München 2007, ISBN 978-3-421-04213-2, 288 S.
- Markus Bitterolf: „Vor ein paar Jahren sind wir zum schönsten Dorf Deutschlands gewählt worden.“ Über den Mord an Marinus Schöberl vor 15 Jahren. In: sans phrase. Zeitschrift für Ideologiekritik. Heft 11. ca ira, Freiburg/Wien, 2017, S. 5–16.
