= Theodor Ludwig Lau =

German lawyer (1670–1740)

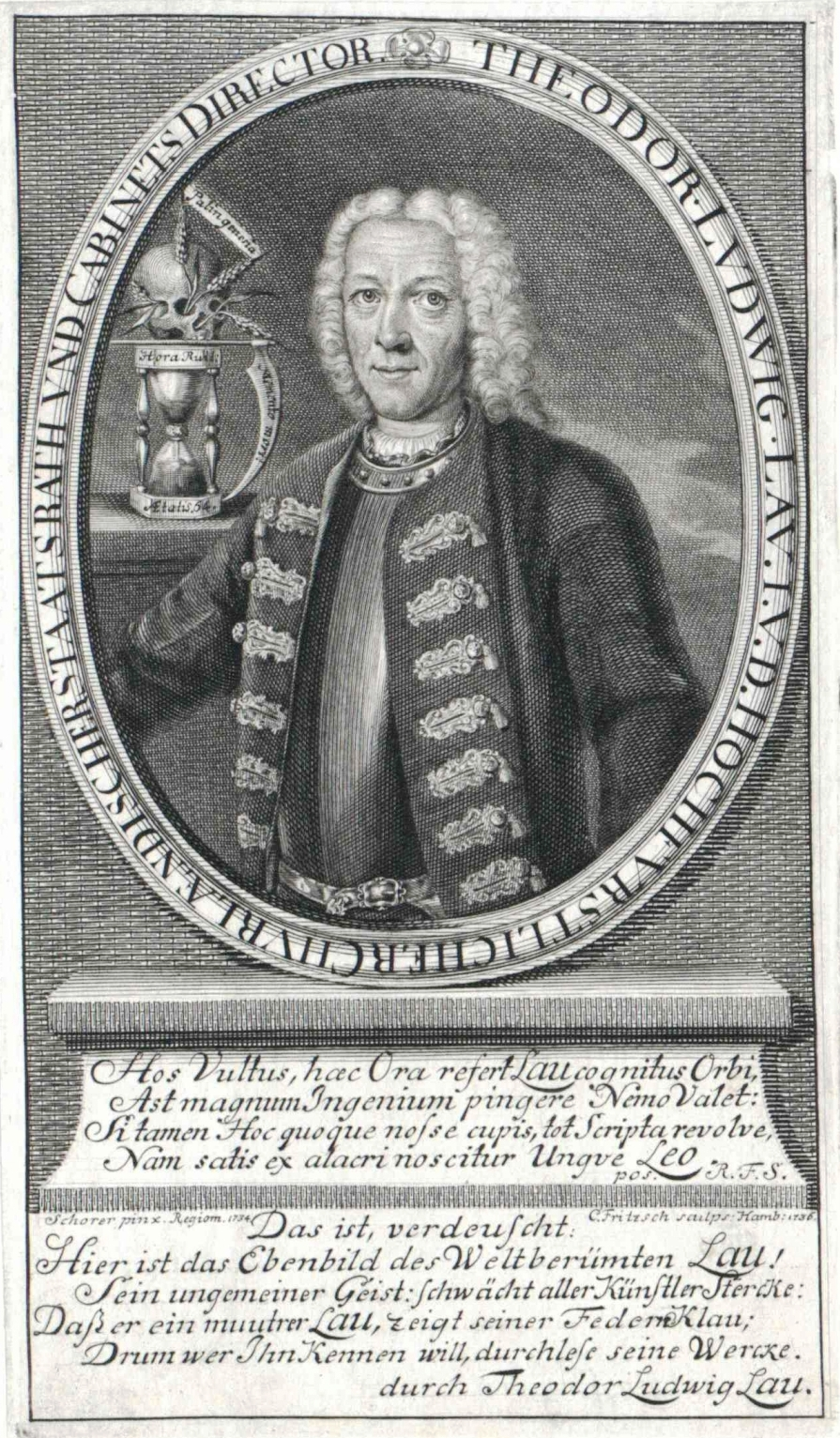
Theodor Ludwig Lau (1670–1740)

Theodor Ludwig Lau (Königsberg, East Prussia, 15 June 1670-Altona, February 1740) was a German lawyer and free thinker known for his radical writings.

== Life ==
Theodor Ludwig Lau was the son of Philipp Lau (1622-1682), a lawyer and professor of law in Königsberg. From 1685 he studied philosophy, theology, and law in Königsberg. In 1694/95 he studied for a year in Halle with Christian Thomasius and then traveled to the Netherlands, England, and France. He then worked in the service of the Duke of Courland, Friedrich Wilhelm Kettler, until 1711. In 1717 he was raised to the imperial nobility under the name Lau von Löwenstern.

Lau published his Deist-Spinozist views in his 1717 and 1719 works in which he adopted a materialistic and pantheistic interpretation of Spinoza's Ethics shared by Friedrich Wilhelm Stosch. Lau's works were quickly banned. He returned to his hometown in 1727 and encountered difficulties when the authorship of his books became known. He lived in Altona under a false name beginning in 1736 and died in poverty.

== Works ==
- Entwurf einer wohleingerichteten Polizey (1717).
- Meditationes philosophicae de Deo, Mundo, et Homine (1717).
- Meditationes, Theses, Dubia philosophico-theologica (1719).
