= Tiger Kirchharz =

German dancer, choreographer, and actress

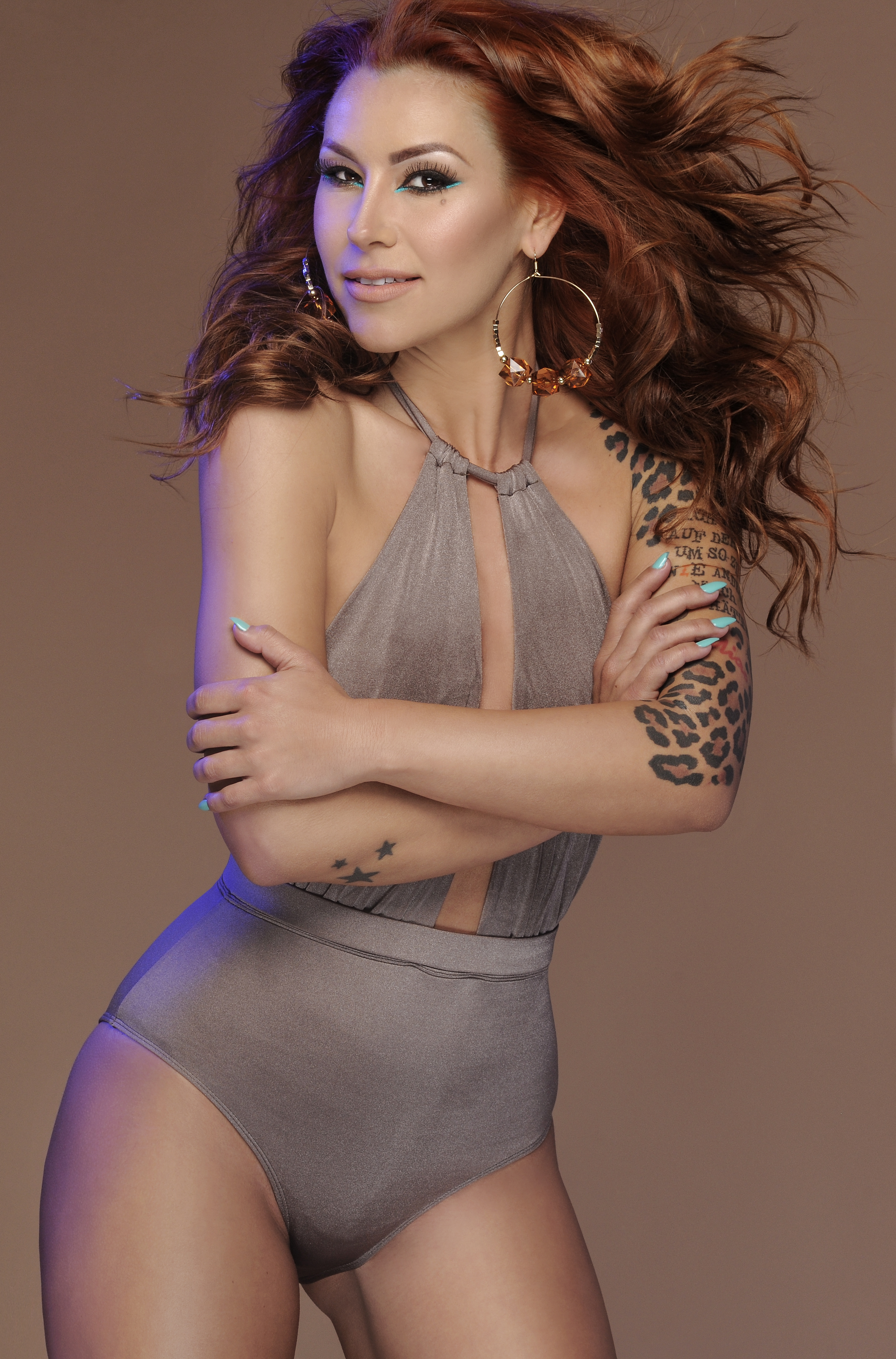
- Born: Diana Kirchharz; 7 January 1985; Munich, West Germany
- Occupations: Dancer; choreographer; actress

Tiger Kirchharz (real name Diana Kirchharz, born 7 January 1985) is a dancer, choreographer and actress.

== Biography ==
Kirchharz was born in Munich, West Germany, and started dancing at the age of four. Her father "baptized" the third of his daughters Tiger after she fell in love with cartoonist Janosch´s Tigerente - and only responded when she has been called Tiger. In addition to ballet classes, she started at the age of 6 years with Hip-hop and Latin dances. In 1999, she began to teach and established two years later her own Dance Company. After her graduation she studied dance at Jessica Iwanson at the Academy for contemporary dance and expanded her ballet, modern, and jazz skills at the Iwanson school. 2009 Tiger built a show called MTV in order to participate at European and World Championships.

Tiger is also active as a choreographer (Winter potato dumplings, 1 1/2 Knights - In search of the ravishing Herzelinde), judge at dance competitions (IDO, TAF, Danish Championship 2013), film actress and model. She is the only European show dancer who starred in Hollywood films like Step Up Revolution (2012) and Step Up: All In (2014).

== Championships ==
- 45 times German Champion in Hip-Hop, Latin dance, Ballroom dance und Discodance, 45 times German Vicechampion
- 2012 World Champion and World Vicechampion Production Show
- 2009 World Champion and European Champion in Production Show
- 2008 European Champion in Hip-Hop Formation
- 2008 European Champion in Hip-Hop Small Group
- 2006 Finals in Casting show Dancestar, VIVA Germany starring Detlef Soost
- 1999 Winner in Latin dance Hessen tanzt

== TV shows ==
- 2016 Deutschland tanzt, ProSieben TV Show – Nils Brunkhorst
- 2015 Menschen 2015, ZDF – Robin Schulz
- 2015 MTV EMA'S – Pharrell Williams – Milan, Italy.
- 2015 Isle of MTV - Omi - Malta
- 2013 MTV EMA'S – Icona Pop – Amsterdam, Netherlands
- 2012 MTV EMA'S – Psy / Rita Ora / Pitbull – Frankfurt, Germany
- 2012 BRIT Awards – Rihanna – London
- 2010 Choreography/dancer in RTL TV Show Nur die Liebe zählt – Munich, Germany
- 2009 MTV EMA'S – Shakira – Berlin, Germany.
- 2007 MTV EMA'S – will.i.am / Avril Lavigne – Munich, Germany
- 1995 Leading actress in short film "Paolo" – Marcus O. Rosenmüller – Greece

== Movie ==
=== Dance and Actress ===
- 2017: Bullyparade – Der Film
- 2016: Welcome to Germany
- 2016: Verrückt nach Fixi
- 2014: Step Up: All In
- 2012: Step Up: Revolution
- 1995: Short film Paolo – Marcus O. Rosenmüller – Greece

=== Choreography ===
- 2016: Welcome to Germany
- 2016: Zwei Sturköpfe im Dreivierteltakt
- Winterkartoffelknödel
- 2008: 1½ Knights – In Search of the Ravishing Princess Herzelinde

== Awards ==
- TAF Award 2013, The Actiondance Federation (TAF)
- 2007 Gold-DVD for "Dance like a Popstar"-DVD
