= Nanosurf =

Nanotechnology company in Liestal, Switzerland

Nanosurf AG
- Type: Publicly unlisted company
- Industry: Nanotechnology
- Founded: 1997 in Switzerland
- Founder: Dominik Braendlin, Lukas Howald and Robert Sum
- Headquarters: Liestal, Switzerland
- Area served: Global
- Key people: Dominik Ziegler (CEO), Björn Pietzak (Head of Customer Success), Mathias Gerardot(Head of Supply Chain), Jens Böttcher (Head of Sales)
- Products: Atomic force microscopes and scanning tunneling microscopes
- Website: https://www.nanosurf.com

Nanosurf AG, headquartered in Liestal, Switzerland, is a leading developer, manufacturer and supplier of metrology solutions for industrial metrology solutions and microscopes for academic research, and education. Nanosurf's atomic force microscopes (AFM) and scanning tunneling microscopes (STM) are used for metrological surface inspections and for the visualization of structures, and material properties on the nanometer scale.

Nanosurf worked with NASA's Phoenix Mars mission to provide the atomic force microscopy module for the Mars probe.

== History ==
In 1997, Nanosurf was awarded the "Start-up-Label" by the Swiss government agency for innovation (KTI). Nanosurf was founded June 4, 1997, in order to design scanning probe microscopes that were accessible for everyone. The Nanosurf founders were inspired by Hans-Joachim Guentherodt, the Director of the Swiss NCCR Nanoscale Science, head of the Institute of Physics of the University of Basel, coordinator of the Swiss Nanoscience Institute, and chairman of the National Center of Competence in Research (NCCR) "Nanoscale Science".

In 1998, The NASA Jet Propulsion Laboratory selected the Nanosurf atomic force microscope for its mission to Mars. Nanosurf joined a consortium consisting of the Institute of Microtechnology, University of Neuchatel, and the Institute of Physics, University of Basel to achieve this goal. Nanosurf was awarded the innovation prize by the Swiss Cantons of Basel-Stadt and Basel- Landschaft in 1998.

In 2000, Nanosurf was awarded the Swiss Technology Award by the Swiss federal industry agency. The easyScan atomic force microscope is introduced to the market. Nanosurf received the 2003 KMU Entrepreneurial award by the Chamber of Commerce of the Cantons of Basel-Landschaft and Basel-Stadt. In 2007, Nanosurf received the Swiss Technology Award (Vontobel Stiftung) for the automated Nanite AFM system. On August 4, Phoenix Mars Probe was launched carrying a Nanosurf AFM scanner.

Since its founding in 1997, Nanosurf AG established subsidiaries in Boston and Santa Barbara (US), Langen (Germany), Bracknell (United Kingdom), Shanghai (China), Hyderabad (India) and Singapore.

== Product lines ==
Nanosurf invented the first scanning tunneling microscope (STM) with the compact size and stability to image individual atoms on a coffee table. In its early days, Nanosurf became known for educational AFMs, and over the course of the following decades moved more and more towards providing high-end instruments for research.

Nanosurf released one of the most versatile AFMs in 2020 the DriveAFM, which was awarded the Wiley award in 2023.

Nanosurf offers the following instruments.

- AFMs for materials science and life sciences: DriveAFM, FlexAFM, CoreAFM.
- Semiconductor Solutions: Alphacen 300 Drive
- Industrial solutions: Alphacen 300 Flex, and fully customized AFM metrology solutions.
- Basic research and education: NaioAFM, NaioSTM.

== Phoenix Mars Lander Mission ==
Nanosurf, the University of Neuchâtel, and the University of Basel were part of a Swiss consortium challenged to equip the Phoenix Mars Probe with the first atomic force microscope in space. This atomic force microscope was designed to be part of the Microscopy, Electrochemistry, and a Conductivity Analyzer (MECA) unit built by NASA's Jet Propulsion Laboratory. It was a key component of the Phoenix probe's ensemble of on-board scientific instruments.

Nanosurf contributed to the Phoenix Mars Mission with an AFM that recorded high-resolution images of Martian dust. These images allowed researchers to study the history of water on Mars, and represent the highest resolution images ever recorded on another planet.

Nanosurf joined in developing, building and testing an atomic force microscope for planetary science applications, in particular for the study of Martian soil. The system consists of a controller board, an electromagnetic scanner and micro-fabricated sensor-chip. Eight cantilevers with integrated, piezoresistive deflection sensors are aligned in a row and are engaged one after the other to provide redundancy in case of tip or cantilever failure. Silicon and molded diamond tips are used for probing the sample. Images can be recorded in both, static and dynamic operation mode. In the latter case, excitation of the resonance frequencies of the cantilevers is achieved by vibrating the whole chip with a piezoelectric disk.

This instrument represents the highest spatial resolution instrument ever produced for in situ planetary studies. The required level of operational robustness was achieved by using a redundant array of microfabricated cantilevers.

== First Atomic Force Microscope Image on Mars ==
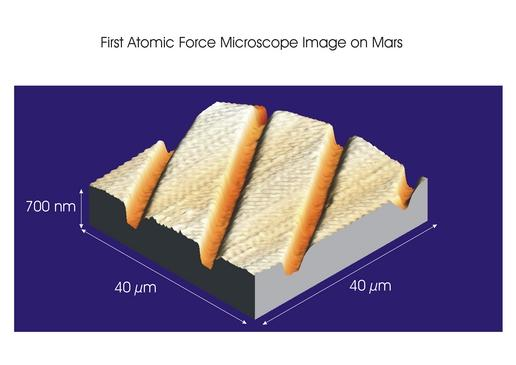

The first image recorded by an atomic force microscope on another planet. On July 9, 2008, Mars day 44 of the Phoenix Mars Mission, the atomic force microscope on the Mars Lander recorded an image of a test grid, which serves as a calibration for the microscope. This image was successfully transmitted to Earth by the Phoenix Mars probe, and demonstrates full functionality of the nano-imaging device under the harsh Martian conditions, satisfying the NASA Phoenix team as well as the Swiss scientific team responsible for the development of the microscope.

The area imaged by the microscope is 40 × 40 μm, small enough to fit on an eyelash. The grooves in this substrate are 14 μm (0.00055 in) apart, from center to center. The vertical dimension is exaggerated in the image to make surface details more visible. The grooves are 300 nm (1.2×10^{−5} in) deep.

== Subsequent product development (2008–present) ==
Following the Phoenix Mars Mission, Nanosurf concentrated on broadening its research-grade portfolio while retaining its educational line. The FlexAFM introduced a flexure-stage scanner aimed at versatile life science and materials work, while the CoreAFM, offered as a single self-contained instrument supporting more than thirty operating modes, became the company's affordable research workhorse.

In 2020 Nanosurf released the DriveAFM, a closed-loop, photothermally driven system positioned as the company's flagship platform. In 2023 the DriveAFM received the Wiley Analytical Science Award.

The NaioAFM and NaioSTM continued the company's table-top tradition for teaching and basic research, while the Alphacen 300 and Alphacen 300 Drive brought Nanosurf scan heads into industrial wafer metrology and large-sample inspection (substrates up to 300 mm and 45 kg). Flex-Mount, Nanite and LensAFM address custom integration into upright optical microscopes and bespoke industrial setups.

Selected Nanosurf instruments since 2008
Year	Product	Category	Notes
2014	FlexAFM	Research	Flexure-stage scanner; verify launch year with manufacturer
2018	CoreAFM	Research	Affordable, self-contained AFM with 30+ modes; verify launch year
2020	DriveAFM	Research (flagship)	CleanDrive photothermal excitation
2025	Alphacen 300 Drive	Industrial	Wafer-metrology system based on the DriveAFM scan head; verify launch year
