= Tamara Milosevic =

German film director (born 1976)

- Born: 1976 (age 49–50); Frankfurt am Main, West Germany
- Occupation: Documentary filmmaker
- Years active: 2003 - present

Tamara Milosevic (born 1976) is a German documentary filmmaker of Serbian descent.

== Life and work ==
Tamara Milosevic was born in Frankfurt am Main. In 2000, she began studying at the Film Academy Baden-Wuerttemberg. At first she focused on animation, but then switched to documentary filmmaking, graduating in 2005. That same year, Milosevic came out with her documentary Wrong Time, Wrong Place which won two awards. The film focuses on an unsolved murder in Germany. Her 2008 documentary El futuro del ayer takes a look at everyday life in Cuba. Shot in 2009, the film Überall nur nicht hier examines a town in post war Bosnia.

== Filmography (selection) ==
- 2003: Cement
- 2005: Wrong Time, Wrong Place (Zur falschen Zeit am falschen Ort)
- 2008: El futuro del ayer
- 2009: Überall nur nicht hier

== Awards and nominations ==
- Cement (2003)
  - 2004: Golden Black Box Award for Best Documentary
- Wrong Time, Wrong Place (2005)
  - 2005: International Leipzig Festival for Documentary and Animated Film - CinemaNet Europe Award
  - 2006: German Television Awards - Promotional Award
