= John Herberger =

German footballer and manager

Personal information
- Full name: Johann Heinrich Herberger
- Date of birth: 9 November 1919
- Place of birth: Wiesental, Germany
- Date of death: June 2002 (aged 82)
- Place of death: Altbach, Germany
- Position: Midfielder

Youth career
- –1936: FV 1912 Wiesental

Senior career*
Years	Team	Apps	(Gls)
1936–1940	Karlsruher FC Phönix		
1939–1940	Eintracht Frankfurt		
1940–1941	CSC 03 Kassel		
1942	Blau Weiß 90 Berlin		
1943	FV Saarbrücken		
1943–1945	1. FC Nürnberg		
1945–1946	FC Bayern Munich		
1946	FV Saarbrücken		
1946–1947	Karlsruher FV		
1947–1949	VfB Stuttgart		
1948–1953	Stuttgarter Kickers		

Managerial career
- New York Hakoah
- 1954: SC Geislingen/Steige
- 1956–1964: 1st German Sport Club Brooklyn
- 1960: Junior All-Stars New York
- 1964: United States
- * Club domestic league appearances and goals

Johann Heinrich Herberger (9 November 1919 – June 2002) was a German football coach and former player.

He played for FV 1912 Wiesental, Karlsruher FC Phönix (1936–1940), Eintracht Frankfurt (1939–40), CSC 03 Kassel (01/40–1941), Blau Weiß 90 Berlin (01/42–10/42), FV Saarbrücken (01/43–06/43), 1. FC Nürnberg (07/43–1945), FC Bayern Munich (1945–46), FV Saarbrücken (1946), Karlsruher FV (1946–1947), VfB Stuttgart (1947–1949) and Stuttgarter Kickers (1948–1953).

After he ended his career, he went on to become a coach. He coached New York Hakoah in the American Soccer League (the team also competed in the International Soccer League). He also trained SC Geislingen/Steige (Germany, 1954), 1st German Sport Club Brooklyn (1956–1964), the Junior All-Stars New York (1960), and the team of the German-American Soccer association. During his time in the U.S. he has been called "John" instead of "Johann".

Herberger coached the United States men's national soccer team for one game in 1964.

Herberger is related to Sepp Herberger who won the 1954 World Cup, but not closely. His great-grandfather was the brother of Sepp Herberger's father.
