= Nanosensors (company) =

- Product type: Nanotechnology; AFM probes AFM tips AFM cantilevers
- Current owner: NanoWorld
- Introduced: 1993
- Markets: Worldwide
- Tagline: The World Leader in Scanning Probes
- Website: www.nanosensors.com

Nanosensors Inc. is a company that manufactures probes for use in atomic force microscopes (AFM) and scanning probe microscopes (SPM). This private, for profit company was founded November 21, 2018. Nanosensors Inc. is located in Neuchatel, Switzerland.

== History ==
Nanosensors was founded as "Nanoprobe" in 1990, building on research conducted at IBM Sindelfingen on fundamental technologies required for the batch processing of silicon AFM probes using bulk micromachining.

In 1993, Nanosensors commercialized SPM and AFM probes worldwide. Their developments in batch processing technologies for producing AFM probes contributed to introducing Atomic Force Microscopes into the industry of the time. In recognition of this achievement, Nanosensors discerned the Dr.-Rudolf-Eberle Innovation Award of the German State of Baden-Württemberg and the Innovation Prize of the German Industry in 1995 and the Innovation Award of the Förderkreis für die Mikroelektronik e.V. in 1999.

In 2002, Nanosensors was acquired by and integrated into Switzerland-based NanoWorld. It is still an independent business unit.

== Significance ==
Researchers have developed an array of operating modes and methods for Scanning probe microscopy and Atomic Force Microscopy. The use and application of such methods requires SPM or AFM instruments equipped with method-specific SPM or AFM probes. Nanosensors supplies SPM or AFM users worldwide with a range of such method-specific SPM or AFM probes.

== Products ==
=== AFM Probe Series ===
==== PointProbePlus ====
The PointProbePlus series is directly based on the technology originally developed and commercialized by Nanosensors in 1993. The original PointProbe technology has been upgraded to the PointProbePlus technology in 2004 yielding a reduced variation of tip shape and increased reproducibility of images. It is manufactured from highly doped mono-crystalline silicon. The tip is pointing into the <100> crystal direction.

- PointProbePlus XY-Alignment Series & Alignment Chip
- PointProbePlus Silicon MFM Probe Series
- SuperSharpSilicon
- High Aspect Ratio AFM probes

==== AdvancedTEC ====
The tip of the AdvancedTEC AFM probe series protrudes from the end of the cantilever and is visible through the optical system of the atomic force microscope. This visibility from the top allows the operator of the microscope to position the tip of this AFM probe at the point of interest.

- Akiyama-Probe
