= NanoWorld =

Atomic force microscope component manufacturer

NanoWorld AG
- Company type: Private (held by NanoWorld Holding AG)
- Industry: Nanotechnology
- Founded: Neuchâtel, Switzerland (June 23, 2000)
- Headquarters: Neuchâtel, Switzerland
- Area served: Worldwide
- Key people: Manfred Detterbeck (Founder & CEO)
- Products: AFM Probes; AFM tips AFM cantilevers
- Number of employees: Over 50 - Jan. 2012
- Parent: NanoWorld Holding AG, Switzerland
- Website: www.nanoworld.com

Location: Neuchâtel, Switzerland

NanoWorld is the global market leader for tips for scanning probe microscopy (SPM) and atomic force microscopy (AFM). The atomic force microscope (AFM) is the defining instrument for the whole field of nanoscience and nanotechnology. It enables its users in research and high-tech industry to investigate materials at the atomic scale. AFM probes are the key consumable, the “finger” that enables the scientist to scan surfaces point-by-point at the atomic scale. Consistent high quality of the scanning probes is vital for reproducible results.

== NanoWorld Corporation ==
NanoWorld was founded in 2000 with venture capital and strong financial background in Neuchâtel, Switzerland, by CEO Manfred Detterbeck, microsystems engineer, master of business and engineering. The company closely collaborates with the IMT (Institute of Microengineering at the EPFL, one of the two Swiss Federal Institutes of Technology), the CSEM (Swiss Center of Electronics and Microtechnology) and the University of Neuchâtel.

In 2002, NanoWorld has acquired the trademark and the technology from Nanosensors (company) considered a "giant" in the AFM probe industry. It is considered one of the top three Swiss nanotechnology companies with a global reputation, inspired by the invention of the atomic force microscope in the IBM research laboratories in Switzerland with a leading market position for AFM probes.

Market research and industry experts confirm that NanoWorld today is the global market leader for AFM probes for scanning probe microscopy (SPM) and atomic force microscopy (AFM). NanoWorld's unique selling proposition is the consistent quality of its AFM probes which is essential for reproducible imaging by atomic force microscope. Its AFM probes cover the full range of atomic force microscopy and Scanning probe microscopy applications. NanoWorld AFM probes are used in research (material science, physics, life science, biology) as well as in industrial applications (semiconductor industry).
