= 1895 in Germany =

- Decades: 1870s; 1880s; 1890s; 1900s; 1910s
- See also: Other events of 1895; History of Germany • Timeline • Years

Events in the year 1895 in Germany.

== Incumbents ==
=== National level ===
- Emperor – Wilhelm II
- Chancellor – Chlodwig, Prince of Hohenlohe-Schillingsfürst

=== State level ===
==== Kingdoms ====
- King of Bavaria – Otto
- King of Prussia – Wilhelm II
- King of Saxony – Albert
- King of Württemberg – William II

==== Grand Duchies ====
- Grand Duke of Baden – Frederick I
- Grand Duke of Hesse – Ernest Louis
- Grand Duke of Mecklenburg-Schwerin – Frederick Francis III
- Grand Duke of Mecklenburg-Strelitz – Frederick William
- Grand Duke of Oldenburg – Peter II
- Grand Duke of Saxe-Weimar-Eisenach – Charles Alexander

==== Principalities ====
- Schaumburg-Lippe – George, Prince of Schaumburg-Lippe
- Schwarzburg-Rudolstadt – Günther Victor, Prince of Schwarzburg-Rudolstadt
- Schwarzburg-Sondershausen – Karl Günther, Prince of Schwarzburg-Sondershausen
- Principality of Lippe – Woldemar, Prince of Lippe to 20 March, then Alexander, Prince of Lippe (with Prince Adolf of Schaumburg-Lippe as regent)
- Reuss Elder Line – Heinrich XXII, Prince Reuss of Greiz
- Reuss Younger Line – Heinrich XIV, Prince Reuss Younger Line
- Waldeck and Pyrmont – Friedrich, Prince of Waldeck and Pyrmont

==== Duchies ====
- Duke of Anhalt – Frederick I, Duke of Anhalt
- Duke of Brunswick – Prince Albert of Prussia (regent)
- Duke of Saxe-Altenburg – Ernst I, Duke of Saxe-Altenburg
- Duke of Saxe-Coburg and Gotha – Alfred, Duke of Saxe-Coburg and Gotha
- Duke of Saxe-Meiningen – Georg II, Duke of Saxe-Meiningen

==== Colonial Governors ====
- Cameroon (Kamerun) – Jesko von Puttkamer (3rd term) to 27 March, then ...von Lücke to 4 May, then again Jesko von Puttkamer (4th term) to 26 October, then from 27 October Theodor Seitz (2nd term)
- German East Africa (Deutsch-Ostafrika) – Friedrich Radbod Freiher von Schele to 25 April, then Hermann Wissmann
- German New Guinea (Deutsch-Neuguinea) – Gerog Schmiele to 3 March, then Hugo Rüdiger (both Landeshauptleute of the German New Guinea Company)
- German South-West Africa (Deutsch-Südwestafrika) – Theodor Leutwein (Landeshauptleute)
- Togoland – Jesko von Puttkamer (Landeshauptleute) (2nd term) to 13 August, then vacant to 18 November, then August Köhler (Landeshauptleute)

=== Events ===
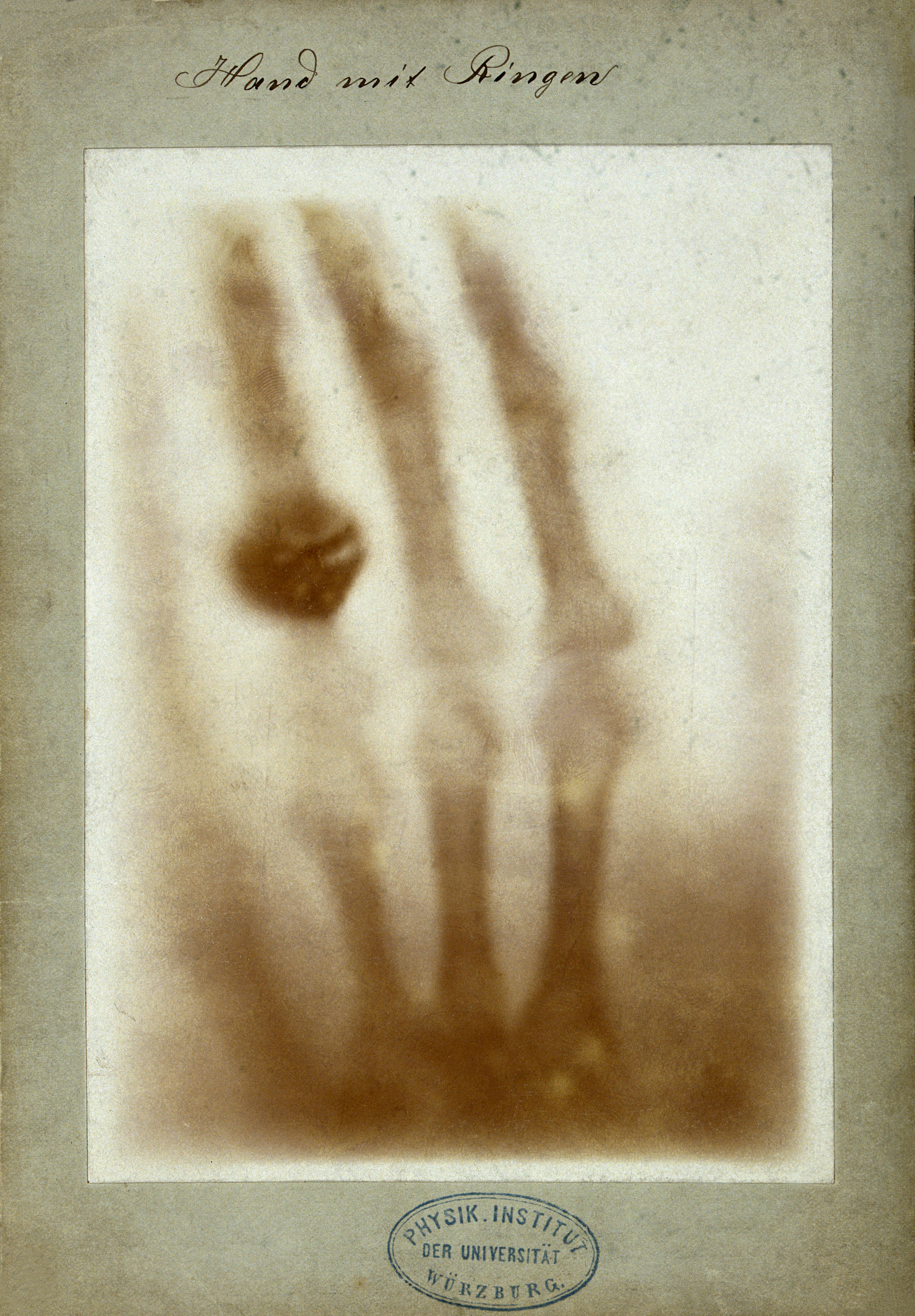
First medical X-ray by Wilhelm Röntgen of his wife Anna Bertha Ludwig's hand

- 5 May – German football club Fortuna Düsseldorf is founded.
- 8 November – Wilhelm Röntgen produces and detects electromagnetic radiation in a wavelength range known as X-rays or Röntgen rays
- 15 December – German football club Eintracht Braunschweig is founded.

=== Undated ===
- Hermann Emil Fischer and Arthur Speier first describe Fischer–Speier esterification.
- Wilhelm Emil Fein invents the electrically driven hand drill.
- Carl von Linde files for patent of the Linde cycle.
- Grace Chisholm Young becomes the first woman awarded a doctorate at a German university.
- German trade unions have c. 270,000 members.

== Births ==
- 20 January – Walter Bock, German chemist (died 1948)
- 14 February – Max Horkheimer German philosopher and sociologist (died 1973)
- 15 February – Wilhelm Burgdorf, German general (died 1945)
- 7 March – Werner Schrader, German officer (died 1944)
- 29 March – Ernst Jünger, German author (died 1998)
- 7 April:
  - Margarete Schön, German actress (died 1985)
  - Theodor Strünck, German lawyer (died 1945)
- 15 June – Paul Giesler, German politician (died 1945)
- 23 June – Joseph Vogt, German classical historian (died 1986)
- 6 July – Ernst Langlotz, German archaeologist (died 1978)
- 8 July – Heinrich-Hermann von Hülsen, German major general (died 1982)
- 10 July – Carl Orff, German composer (died 1982)
- 9 August – Franz Schafheitlin, German actor (died 1980)
- 13 August – Werner Dankwort, German diplomat (died 1986)
- 26 August – Harald Paulsen, German actor (died 1954)
- 31 August – Karl Fiehler, German politician (died 1969)
- 4 September – Erich Weise, German historian and archivist (1972)
- 6 September – Walter Dornberger, German Army artillery officer, leader of the V-2 rocket programme (died 1980)
- 15 September – Hildebrand Gurlitt, German art dealer, art historian and war profiteer (died 1956)
- 25 September – Friedrich Gustav Jaeger, German resistance fighter (died 1944)
- 5 October – Ludwig Gehre, German officer (died 1945)
- 10 October – Wolfram Freiherr von Richthofen, German field marshal (died 1945)
- 13 October – Kurt Schumacher, German politician (died 1952)
- 26 October – Joseph-Ernst Graf Fugger von Glött, German politician (died 1981)
- 30 October – Gerhard Domagk German pathologist and bacteriologist (died 1964)
- 10 November – Franz Bachelin, German art director (died 1980)
- 16 November – Paul Hindemith, German composer and conductor (died 1963)
- 23 November – Rudolf Katz, German politician and judge (died 1961)
- 2 December – Erwin Casmir, fencer (died 1982)
- 29 December – Oswald Freisler, lawyer (died 1939)

== Deaths ==
- 13 March – Louise Otto-Peters, German women's rights movement activist (born 1819)
- 20 March – Woldemar, Prince of Lippe, nobleman (born 1824)
- 31 March – Georg von Dollmann, German architect (born 1830)
- 11 April – Julius Lothar Meyer, German chemist (born 1830)
- 23 April – Carl Ludwig, German physician and physiologist (born 1816)
- 30 April – Gustav Freytag, German playwright (born 1816)
- 23 May – Franz Ernst Neumann, German mineralogist, physicist and mathematician (born 1798)
- 2 June – Heinrich von Friedberg, German politician (born 1813)
- 30 June – Hermann Knoblauch, German physicist (born 1820)
- 14 July – Karl Heinrich Ulrichs, German writer (born 1825)
- 1 August – Heinrich von Sybel, German historian (born 1817)
- 5 August – Friedrich Engels, German philosopher, social scientist and journalist (born 1820)
- 28 August – Princess Elisabeth Anna of Prussia, Prussian princess (born 1857)
- 8 September – Adam Opel, German founder of the German automobile company Adam Opel AG (born 1837)
- 24 September – Heinrich Adolf von Bardeleben, German surgeon (born 1819)
- 8 November – Johannes Overbeck, German archaeologist (born 1826)
- 11 November – Gustav Langenscheidt, German publisher (born 1832)
- 14 December – Paul Melchers, German cardinal of Roman-Catholic Church (born 1813)
