= 1982 in Germany =

- Decades: 1960s; 1970s; 1980s; 1990s; 2000s
- See also: Other events of 1982; History of Germany; Timeline; Years

Events in the year 1982 in Germany.

== Incumbents ==
- President – Karl Carstens
- Chancellor
  - Helmut Schmidt (until 2 October 1982)
  - Helmut Kohl (from 2 October 1982)

== Events ==
- 12-23 February - 32nd Berlin International Film Festival
- 24 April - Germany in the Eurovision Song Contest 1982: Nicole Seibert wins the contest with "Ein bißchen Frieden".
- 10 June - 1982 Bonn summit
- 19 June - 28 October - The documenta 7 art exhibition is held in Kassel.
- 24 June - 1982 Nuremberg shooting.
- 23 September - Launch of the all-new Audi 100.
- 4 October - The first cabinet led by Helmut Kohl was sworn in.
- 13 October - Launch of the Ford Sierra, which replaces the Ford Taunus in Germany and the rest of Continental Europe, as well as the Ford Cortina in the United Kingdom and other right-hand drive markets.
- December - The Audi 100 is voted European Car of the Year, with the Ford Sierra coming in second place.
- 19 December - Hamburg state election, December 1982

== Births ==
- 22 January - Liane Bahler, German cyclist (died 2007)
- 7 February – Wiebke Zweig, German politician
- 17 March - Jan Wolfgarten, German swimmer
- 2 April - Beate Meißner, German politician
- 6 April - Alwara Höfels, German actress
- 16 April - Michael Ratajczak, footballer
- 7 June - Jürgen Kretz, German politician
- 6 July - Julius Brink, German beach volleyball player
- 29 July - Allison Mack, American actress and criminal
- 31 July - Michael Jung, German equestrian
- 12 September - Max Hoff, German canoeist
- 16 September - Barbara Engleder, German sport shooter
- 18 November - Gracia Baur, German singer
- 9 December - Bastian Swillims, German sprinter
- 23 December - Benjamin Raschke, German politician

== Deaths ==
- 11 January - Bruno Diekmann, German politician (born 1897)
- 21 February – Gershom Scholem, German-born Israeli Jewish philosopher and historian (b. 1897)
- 20 March - Bally Prell, German singer and folk singer (born 1922)
- 29 March
  - Carl Orff, German composer (born 1895)
  - Walter Hallstein, German diplomat and politician (born 1901)
- 9 April - Robert Havemann, German chemist (born 1910)
- 19 April - Erwin Casmir, fencer (born 1895)
- 10 May - Peter Weiss, German writer (born 1916)
- 30 May - Albert Norden, German politician (born 1904)
- 2 June - Herbert Quandt, German industrialist (born 1910)
- 6 June – Heinrich-Hermann von Hülsen, German major general (born 1895)
- 10 June - Rainer Werner Fassbinder, German film director, screenwriter, and actor (born 1945)
- 15 June - Hermann Schlichting, German engineer (born 1907)
- 18 June - Curd Jürgens, German actor (born 1915)
- 26 June - Alexander Mitscherlich, German psychoanalyst (born 1908)
- 2 July - Siegfried Westphal, German general (born 1902)
- 10 July - Karl Hein, German athlete (born 1908)
- 1 August -Otto Bayer, German chemist (born 1902)
- 5 August - Dieter Borsche, German actor (born 1909)
- 9 October – Herbert Meinhard Mühlpfordt, German historian (born 1893)
- 30 October – Wolfgang Heinz, German actor (born 1900 in Austria)
- 29 November - Hermann Balck, German general (born 1893)
- 30 November - Adolf Heusinger, German general (born 1897)

== See also ==
- 1982 in German television
