= 1984 in Germany =

- Decades: 1960s; 1970s; 1980s; 1990s; 2000s
- See also: Other events of 1984; History of Germany; Timeline; Years

Events in the year 1984 in Germany.

== Incumbents ==
- President - Karl Carstens (until 30 June), Richard von Weizsäcker (starting 1 July)
- Chancellor – Helmut Kohl

== Events ==
- 17–28 February - 34th Berlin International Film Festival
- 29 March – Germany in the Eurovision Song Contest 1984
- 17 June - 1984 European Parliament election in West Germany
- 24 August - Launch of the all-new Opel Kadett, which will be built in West Germany as well as other countries including Belgium and the United Kingdom.
- 7 October - East German Republic Day Parade of 1984
- September–October - Exercise Lionheart, the largest exercise of the British Armed Forces, take place.
- December - The Opel Kadett is voted European Car of the Year, the first Opel car to win the award.
- Date unknown: German company Grundig is taken over by Netherlands company Philips.

== Births ==
- 1 January – Christian Eigler, German footballer
- 9 January – Benjamin Danso, German rugby player
- 11 January – Mark Forster, German singer-songwriter
- 19 January – Aljona Savchenko, pair skater
- 25 January – Stefan Kießling, German football player
- 24 March – Philipp Petzschner, tennis player
- 26 March – Jürgen Spieß, weightlifter
- 10 May – Johannes Kölling, German politician
- 31 May – Daniela Samulski, German swimmer (died 2018)
- 13 June – Antje Möldner-Schmidt, German athlete
- 20 June – Dennis Malura, footballer
- 7 July – Stephanie Stumph, German actress
- 1 August – Bastian Schweinsteiger, German footballer.
- 5 August – Helene Fischer, German singer
- 29 August
  - Christian Lell, German footballer
  - Alexander Hug, rugby player
  - Helge Meeuw, German swimmer
- 29 September – Per Mertesacker, German footballer.
- 11 October – Sebastian Ernst, German athlete
- 18 October
  - Robert Harting, German discus thrower
  - Annekatrin Thiele, German rower
- 13 October – Stefan Gruhner, German politician
- 24 October – Christian Reif, German athlete
- 24 November – Maria Höfl-Riesch, German ski racer
- 28 December – Martin Kaymer, German golfer
- 31 December – David Maaß, German politician

== Deaths ==
- 26 January – Leny Marenbach, German actress (born 1907)
- 22 February – Uwe Johnson, German writer (born 1932)
- 6 March – Martin Niemöller, German theologian and Lutheran pastor (born 1892)
- 21 March – August Frank, Nazi German official, SS leader and convict at the Nuremberg trials (born 1898)
- 30 March – Karl Rahner, German Jesuit priest and theologian (b. 1904)
- 10 April – Willy Semmelrogge, German actor (born 1923)
- 15 April – Grete Hermann, German mathematician and philosopher (born 1901)
- 17 July – Karl Wolff, German Nazi SS Officer (born 1900)
- 9 October – Heinz von Cleve, German stage and film actor (born 1897)
- 21 October – Adolf Fischer, German actor (born 1900)
- 23 November – Paul Dahlke, German actor (born 1904)
- 28 November – Hans Speidel, German general (born 1897)
- 28 November – Hubertus, Prince of Löwenstein-Wertheim-Freudenberg, German politician (born 1906)
- 11 December – Krafft Arnold Ehricke, German rocket-propulsion engineer and advocate for space colonization (born 1917)
- 16 December – Karl Deichgräber, German classical philologist (born 1903)

== See also ==
- 1984 in German television
