= 1903 in Germany =

- Decades: 1880s; 1890s; 1900s; 1910s; 1920s
- See also: Other events of 1903; History of Germany • Timeline • Years

Events in the year 1903 in Germany.

== Incumbents ==
=== National level ===
- Emperor – Wilhelm II
- Chancellor – Bernhard von Bülow

=== State level ===
==== Kingdoms ====
- King of Bavaria – Otto
- King of Prussia – Wilhelm II
- King of Saxony – George
- King of Württemberg – William II

==== Grand duchies ====
- Grand Duke of Baden – Frederick I
- Grand Duke of Hesse – Ernest Louis
- Grand Duke of Mecklenburg-Schwerin – Frederick Francis IV
- Grand Duke of Mecklenburg-Strelitz – Frederick William
- Grand Duke of Oldenburg – Frederick Augustus II
- Grand Duke of Saxe-Weimar-Eisenach – William Ernest

==== Principalities ====
- Schaumburg-Lippe – George, Prince of Schaumburg-Lippe
- Schwarzburg-Rudolstadt – Günther Victor, Prince of Schwarzburg-Rudolstadt
- Schwarzburg-Sondershausen – Karl Günther, Prince of Schwarzburg-Sondershausen
- Principality of Lippe – Alexander, Prince of Lippe (with Ernest II, Count of Lippe-Biesterfeld as regent)
- Reuss Elder Line – Heinrich XXIV, Prince Reuss of Greiz (with Heinrich XIV, Prince Reuss Younger Line as regent)
- Reuss Younger Line – Heinrich XIV, Prince Reuss Younger Line
- Waldeck and Pyrmont – Friedrich, Prince of Waldeck and Pyrmont

==== Duchies ====
- Duke of Anhalt – Frederick I, Duke of Anhalt
- Duke of Brunswick – Prince Albert of Prussia (regent)
- Duke of Saxe-Altenburg – Ernst I, Duke of Saxe-Altenburg
- Duke of Saxe-Coburg and Gotha – Charles Edward, Duke of Saxe-Coburg and Gotha
- Duke of Saxe-Meiningen – Georg II, Duke of Saxe-Meiningen

==== Colonial governors ====
- Cameroon (Kamerun) – Jesko von Puttkamer (8th term)
- Kiaochow (Kiautschou) – Oskar von Truppel
- German East Africa (Deutsch-Ostafrika) – Gustav Adolf von Götzen
- German New Guinea (Deutsch-Neuguinea) – Albert Hahl (2nd term)
- German Samoa (Deutsch-Samoa) – Wilhelm Solf
- German South-West Africa (Deutsch-Südwestafrika) – Theodor Leutwein
- Togoland – Waldemar Horn

== Events ==
- 13 February – Venezuelan crisis. After agreeing to arbitration in Washington, Britain, Germany and Italy reach a settlement with Venezuela, resulting in the Washington Protocols. The naval blockade that began in December 1902 will be lifted, and Venezuela commit 30% of its customs duties to settling claims.
- 16 June – German federal election, 1903: The Centre Party remains the largest party in the Reichstag. Shortly after the election, the National-Social Association is dissolved by its leader Friedrich Naumann, and its members join the Free-minded Union.
- 29 September – Prussia becomes the second jurisdiction to require mandatory driver's licenses for operators of motor vehicles, after New York State in 1901.

=== Undated ===
- German company August Storck is founded.

== Births ==
- 7 January – Albrecht Haushofer, German geographer, diplomat and writer (died 1945)
- 18 January
  - Berthold Goldschmidt, German composer (died 1996 in the United Kingdom)
  - Werner Hinz, German actor (died 1985)
- 10 February – Karl Deichgräber, classical philologist (died 1984)
- 24 February – Franz Burda I, German publisher (died 1986)
- 27 February – Grethe Weiser, German actress (died 1970)
- 6 March
  - Erna Herchenröder, German trade unionist and politician (died 1977)
  - Franz Wessel, German judge (died 1958)
- 24 March – Adolf Butenandt, German chemist (died 1995)
- 26 April – Alex Möller, German politician (died 1985)
- 27 April – Karl Maron, German politician (died 1975)
- 8 June – Eduard Brücklmeier, German diplomat (died 1944)
- 10 June:
  - Robert A. Stemmle, German film director and screenwriter (died 1974)
  - Theo Lingen, German actor, screenwriter and film director (died 1978)
- 16 July – Fritz Bauer, German judge (died 1968)
- 22 July:
  - Willi Dehnkamp, German politician (died 1985)
  - Anton Saefkow, German politician (died 1944)
- 26 July – Kurt Mahler, German mathematician (died 1988)
- 31 July – Emil Hirschfeld, German athlete (died 1968)
- 29 August – Ernst Kreuder, German writer (died 1972)
- 3 August – Rudolf Wolters, German architect (died 1983)
- 11 September:
  - Theodor W. Adorno, German philosopher (died 1969)
  - Carl Joseph Leiprecht, German bishop of Roman-Catholic Church (died 1981)
- 11 October – Hans Söhnker, film actor (died 1981)
- 3 October – Werner Klingler, German film director and actor (died 1972)
- 5 December – Johannes Heesters, German actor (died 2011)
- 26 December – Herbert Albert, German conductor (died 1973)
- Date unknown – Ernst David Bergmann, German-born Israeli nuclear scientist and chemist (died 1975)

== Deaths ==
- 13 April – Moritz Lazarus, German philosopher (born 1824)
- 14 June – Carl Gegenbaur, German anatomist (born 1826)
- 8 August – Adolf Schiel, German-born Boer army officer (born 1858)
- 4 September – Hermann Zumpe, German conductor (born 1850)
- 1 November – Theodor Mommsen, German classical scholar, historian, jurist, journalist, politician, archaeologist (born 1817)
