= 1983 in Germany =

- Decades: 1960s; 1970s; 1980s; 1990s; 2000s
- See also: Other events of 1983; History of Germany; Timeline; Years

Events in the year 1983 in Germany.

== Incumbents ==
- President – Karl Carstens
- Chancellor – Helmut Kohl

== Events ==
- 18 February - 1 March - 33rd Berlin International Film Festival
- 6 March - West German federal election, 1983
- 16 March – The Ismaning radio transmitter (last wooden radio tower in Germany) is demolished.
- 29 March - The second cabinet led by Helmut Kohl is sworn in.
- 23 April - Germany in the Eurovision Song Contest 1983
- 22 May - 1983 Rhein-Main Starfighter crash
- 22 July - Launch of the Ford Orion, saloon version of the current front-wheel drive Escort, which will be built in Cologne, West Germany, as well as in British factories.
- 19 September - The MK2 Volkswagen Golf is unveiled at the Frankfurt Motor Show, spelling the end of MK1 Golf production after almost a decade. It will be launched in left-hand drive form imminently, and in right-hand drive form from March 1984.
- December - The new Volkswagen Golf manages third place in the European Car of the Year award, which is won by the Fiat Uno from Italy, with second place being attained by the Peugeot 205 from France.

== Births ==
- 11 January – Adrian Sutil, German Formula One driver
- 17 January
  - Johannes Herber, basketball player
  - Alexander Meier, German football player
- 21 January – Moritz Volz, German footballer
- 28 April – Andreas Kleinheinz, German ice hockey player
- 3 June – Janine Habeck, German model
- 12 June – Alexander Pipa, German rugby player
- 24 June – Albert, 12th Prince of Thurn and Taxis, German aristocrat and businessman
- 26 June – D.L. Lang, German-American poet
- 19 July – Prince Ernst August of Hanover
- 24 August – Marcel Goc, German ice hockey player
- 29 August – Wilma Dressel, German rower
- 3 September – Alexander Klaws, German singer and winner of Deutschland sucht den Superstar (season 1) and Let's Dance (German season 7)
- 3 September – Eko Fresh, German rapper
- 10 September – Nina Klinkel, German politician
- 23 September – Lucas Prisor, German actor
- 1 November – Micaela Schäfer, German model and actress
- 2 November – Andreas Bourani, German singer
- 8 November – Katharina Molitor, German athlete
- 11 November – Philipp Lahm, German football player
- 16 November – Britta Steffen, German swimmer
- 29 November – Aylin Tezel, German actress
- 18 December – Péter Vida, German politician

== Deaths ==
- 7 January – Rudolf Wolters, German architect (born 1903)
- 27 April – Georg von Holtzbrinck, German publisher (born 1909)
- 1 June – Anna Seghers, German writer (born 1900)
- 6 June – Hans Leip, German poet and playwright (born 1893)
- 18 June – Marianne Brandt, German industrial designer (born 1893)
- 19 June – Georg Diederichs, German politician (born 1900)
- 10 July – Werner Egk, German composer (born 1901)
- 12 July – Erich Warsitz, German pilot (born 1906)
- 19 July – Erik Ode, German actor (born 1910)
- 24 July – Nicolaus von Below, adjutant to Adolf Hitler (born 1907)
- 6 August – Klaus Nomi, German singer and performance artist (born 1944)
- 12 August – Theodor Burchadi, German admiral (born 1892)
- 9 October – Herbert Weichmann, German politician (born 1896)
- 18 October – Cornelius Rost, German soldier (born 1919)

== See also ==
- 1983 in German television
