= 1892 in Germany =

- Decades: 1870s; 1880s; 1890s; 1900s; 1910s
- See also: Other events of 1892; History of Germany • Timeline • Years

Events in the year 1892 in Germany.

== Incumbents ==
=== National level ===
- Emperor – Wilhelm II
- Chancellor – Leo von Caprivi

=== State level ===
==== Kingdoms ====
- King of Bavaria – Otto
- King of Prussia – Wilhelm II
- King of Saxony – Albert
- King of Württemberg – William II

==== Grand Duchies ====
- Grand Duke of Baden – Frederick I
- Grand Duke of Hesse – Louis IV to 13 March, then Ernest Louis
- Grand Duke of Mecklenburg-Schwerin – Frederick Francis III
- Grand Duke of Mecklenburg-Strelitz – Frederick William
- Grand Duke of Oldenburg – Peter II
- Grand Duke of Saxe-Weimar-Eisenach – Charles Alexander

==== Principalities ====
- Schaumburg-Lippe – Adolf I, Prince of Schaumburg-Lippe
- Schwarzburg-Rudolstadt – Günther Victor, Prince of Schwarzburg-Rudolstadt
- Schwarzburg-Sondershausen – Karl Günther, Prince of Schwarzburg-Sondershausen
- Principality of Lippe – Woldemar, Prince of Lippe
- Reuss Elder Line – Heinrich XXII, Prince Reuss of Greiz
- Reuss Younger Line – Heinrich XIV, Prince Reuss Younger Line
- Waldeck and Pyrmont – George Victor, Prince of Waldeck and Pyrmont

==== Duchies ====
- Duke of Anhalt – Frederick I, Duke of Anhalt
- Duke of Brunswick – Prince Albert of Prussia (regent)
- Duke of Saxe-Altenburg – Ernst I, Duke of Saxe-Altenburg
- Duke of Saxe-Coburg and Gotha – Ernst II, Duke of Saxe-Coburg and Gotha
- Duke of Saxe-Meiningen – Georg II, Duke of Saxe-Meiningen

==== Colonial Governors ====
- Cameroon (Kamerun) – Bruno von Schuckmann (acting governor) to 5 January, then Eugen von Zimmerer (3rd term)
- German East Africa (Deutsch-Ostafrika) – Julius Freiherr von Soden
- German New Guinea (Deutsch-Neuguinea) – Fritz Rose (commissioner) to 31 August, then Georg Schmiele (Landeshauptleute of the German New Guinea Company) from 1 September
- German South-West Africa (Deutsch-Südwestafrika) – Curt von François (commissioner)
- Togoland – vacant to 4 June, then Jesko von Puttkamer (acting commissioner) (2nd term)

== Events ==
- 25 July – German football club Hertha BSC is founded in Berlin.

=== Undated ===
- German Open Tennis Championships is founded in Hamburg.
- Travemünde Week in Travemünde is started.
- Berlin Philharmonic is founded in Berlin.

== Births ==
- 4 January – Siegfried Lehman, German-Israeli educator (died 1958)
- 14 January – Martin Niemöller, German anti-Nazi theologian and Lutheran pastor (died 1984)
- 16 January – Wilhelm von Apell, German general (died 1969)
- 18 January – Paul Rostock, German surgeon (died 1956)
- 29 January – Ernst Lubitsch, German film director (died 1947)
- 2 February – Cuno Hoffmeister, German astronomer (died 1968)
- 2 March – Felix Bressart, German actor (died 1949)
- 10 March – Hans Steinhoff, German film director (died 1945)
- 22 March – Johannes Frießner, German general (died 1971)
- 30 March – Erhard Milch, German field marshal of Luftwaffe (died 1972)
- 1 April – Anton Storch, German politician (died 1975)
- 3 April – Hans Rademacher, German mathematician (died 1969)
- 7 April – Julius Hirsch, German footballer (died 1945)
- 16 April – Dora Richter, German transgender woman, first known person to undergo complete male-to-female gender-affirming surgery (died unknown)
- 23 April – Richard Huelsenbeck, German poet and writer (died 1974)
- 30 April – Gottlob Bauknecht, German businessman (died 1976)
- 2 May:
  - Trude Hesterberg, German actress (died 1967)
  - Manfred von Richthofen, German fighter pilot (died 1918)
- 14 May – Theodor Burchardi, German admiral (died 1983)
- 31 May – Gregor Strasser, German Nazi politician (died 1934)
- 12 June – Ferdinand Schörner, German field marshal (died 1973)
- 22 June – Robert Ritter von Greim, German field marshal (died 1945)
- 27 June – Erich Köhler, German politician (died 1958)
- 30 June – Oswald Pohl, German S.S. officer (died 1951)
- 12 July – Harry Piel, German actor and film director (died 1963)
- 15 July – Walter Benjamin, German philosopher and cultural critic (died 1940)
- 22 July – Arthur Seyss-Inquart, German politician (died 1946)
- 15 August – Walther Nehring, German general (died 1983)
- 13 September – Victoria Louise of Prussia, German noblewoman (died 1980)
- 23 September – Lorenz Jaeger, German cardinal of Roman Catholic Church (died 1975)
- 3 October – Bernhard Schweitzer, German archaeologist (died 1966)
- 9 November – Erich Auerbach, German philologist, scholar, and literature critic (died 1957)
- 24 November – Karl Steinhoff, German politician (died 1981)
- 1 December – Walter Bathe, German swimmer (died 1959)
- 7 December – Max Ehrlich, German actor, screenwriter and humour writer (died 1944 in Auschwitz concentration camp)
- 19 December – Max Seydewitz, German politician (died 1987)

== Deaths ==
- Undated – William Julius Mann, theologian (born 1819)
- 7 January – Ernst Wilhelm von Brücke, German physician and physiologist (born 1819)
- 16 January – Prince Kraft zu Hohenlohe-Ingelfingen, German general and military writer (born 1827)
- 5 February – Theodor Marsson, German botanist (born 1816)
- 13 March – Louis IV, Grand Duke of Hesse (born 1837)
- 14 March – Carl Siegmund Franz Credé, German gynecologist and obstetrician (born 1819)
- 21 April – Princess Alexandrine of Prussia (born 1803)
- 5 May – August Wilhelm von Hofmann, German chemist (born 1818)
- 20 June – Albert Wolff, German sculptor (born 1814)
- 5 August – Henriette Feuerbach, German author (born 1812)
- 16 October – Georg Bleibtreu, German painter (born 1828)
- 28 October – Felix Otto Dessoff, German conductor (born 1835)
- 6 November – Wilhelm Maurenbrecher, German historian (born 1838)
- 6 December – Werner von Siemens, German inventor and industrialist (born 1816)
- 28 December – Vincent Stoltenberg Lerche, Norwegian painter (born 1837).

== Literature ==
Frank Wedekind's magnum opus drama "Das Erwachen des Fruhlings" or "Spring Awakening" is set during this year with one of the play's protagonists Wendla Bergmann's death occurring on October 27.
