= 1979 in Germany =

- Decades: 1950s; 1960s; 1970s; 1980s; 1990s
- See also: Other events of 1979; History of Germany • Timeline • Years

Events in the year 1979 in Germany.

== Incumbents ==
- President – Walter Scheel (until 30 June), Karl Carstens (starting 1 July)
- Chancellor – Helmut Schmidt

== Events ==
- 20 February - 3 March - 29th Berlin International Film Festival
- March 17 - Germany in the Eurovision Song Contest 1979
- March 18 - Rhineland-Palatinate state election, 1979
- March 18 - West Berlin state election, 1979
- June 10 - European Parliament election, 1979 (West Germany)
- July 31 - The city of Lahn in Hesse is dissolved after public outcry, the former cities of Giessen and Wetzlar are restored.
- undated: Neue Deutsche Welle, a pop musical genre, spreads throughout the land.

== Births ==
- 7 January - Christian Lindner, German politician
- 10 January - Maximilian Brückner, German actor
- 13 January - Joko Winterscheidt, German television presenter
- 21 January - Sebastian Schindzielorz, German footballer
- 29 January - Sarah Kuttner, German television presenter and author
- 2 February - Klaus Mainzer, German rugby player
- 6 February - Alice Weidel, German politician
- 3 March - Klaus Rogge, German rower
- 12 March - Tim Wieskötter, German canoeist
- 20 April - Fady Maalouf, Lebanese-born singer and runner-up of Deutschland sucht den Superstar (season 5)
- 25 May - Elli Erl, singer and winner of Deutschland sucht den Superstar (season 2)
- 26 May - Jonas Reckermann, German beach volleyball player
- 29 May - Arne Friedrich, German football player
- 14 June - Constantin Schreiber, German journalist
- 10 July - Tobias Unger, German athlete
- 14 July - Robin Szolkowy, pair skater
- 24 August - Markus Walger, rugby player
- 24 August - Markus Walger, German rugby player
- 25 August - Philipp Mißfelder, German politician (died 2015)
- 27 August - Ole Bischof, German judoka
- 5 November - Colin Grzanna, German rugby player and surgeon
- 2 December - Yvonne Catterfeld, German singer
- 21 December - Bert Tischendorf, German actor

== Deaths ==
- 4 January - Peter Frankenfeld, German comedian (born 1913)
- 22 March - Paul Nevermann, German politician (born 1902)
- 2 April - Erich Rademacher, German swimmer (born 1901)
- 14 May - Heinz Pollay, German equestrian (born 1908)
- 1 June - Werner Forssmann, German physician (born 1904)
- 3 June - Arno Schmidt, German author and translator (born 1914)
- 5 June - Heinz Erhardt, German comedian (born 1909)
- 8 June - Reinhard Gehlen, German general and intelligent officer (born 1902)
- 15 June - Ernst Meister, German writer (born 1911)
- 26 June - Franz-Josef Röder, German politician (born 1909)
- 28 June - Paul Dessau, German conductor and composer (born 1894)
- 6 August - Feodor Felix Konrad Lynen, German biochemist (born 1911)
- 12 August - Ernst Boris Chain, German biochemist (born 1906)
- 24 August – Hanna Reitsch, German soldier and pilot (born 1912)
- 12 September - Josef Müller, German politician (born 1898)
- 2 November - Ernst Kals, German submarine commander (born 1905)
- 1 December - Max Jacobson, German physician (born 1900)
- 4 December - Friedrich Ebert Jr., German politician (born 1894)
- 11 December - Carlo Schmid, German politician (born 1896)
- 13 December - Alfred Bengsch, German cardinal of Roman Catholic Church (born 1921)
- 19 December - Wilhelm Kaisen, German politician (born 1887)
- 24 December - Rudi Dutschke, German radical student leader (born 1940)

== See also ==
- 1979 in German television
