= 1896 in Germany =

- Decades: 1870s; 1880s; 1890s; 1900s; 1910s
- See also: Other events of 1896; History of Germany • Timeline • Years

Events in the year 1896 in Germany.

== Incumbents ==
=== National level ===
- Emperor – Wilhelm II
- Chancellor – Chlodwig, Prince of Hohenlohe-Schillingsfürst

=== State level ===
==== Kingdoms ====
- King of Bavaria – Otto
- King of Prussia – Wilhelm II
- King of Saxony – Albert
- King of Württemberg – William II

==== Grand Duchies ====
- Grand Duke of Baden – Frederick I
- Grand Duke of Hesse – Ernest Louis
- Grand Duke of Mecklenburg-Schwerin – Frederick Francis III
- Grand Duke of Mecklenburg-Strelitz – Frederick William
- Grand Duke of Oldenburg – Peter II
- Grand Duke of Saxe-Weimar-Eisenach – Charles Alexander

==== Principalities ====
- Schaumburg-Lippe – George, Prince of Schaumburg-Lippe
- Schwarzburg-Rudolstadt – Günther Victor, Prince of Schwarzburg-Rudolstadt
- Schwarzburg-Sondershausen – Karl Günther, Prince of Schwarzburg-Sondershausen
- Principality of Lippe – Alexander, Prince of Lippe (with Prince Adolf of Schaumburg-Lippe as regent)
- Reuss Elder Line – Heinrich XXII, Prince Reuss of Greiz
- Reuss Younger Line – Heinrich XIV, Prince Reuss Younger Line
- Waldeck and Pyrmont – Friedrich, Prince of Waldeck and Pyrmont

==== Duchies ====
- Duke of Anhalt – Frederick I, Duke of Anhalt
- Duke of Brunswick – Prince Albert of Prussia (regent)
- Duke of Saxe-Altenburg – Ernst I, Duke of Saxe-Altenburg
- Duke of Saxe-Coburg and Gotha – Alfred, Duke of Saxe-Coburg and Gotha
- Duke of Saxe-Meiningen – Georg II, Duke of Saxe-Meiningen

==== Colonial Governors ====
- Cameroon (Kamerun) – Theodor Seitz (2nd term)
- German East Africa (Deutsch-Ostafrika) – Hermann Wissmann to 3 December, then Eduard von Liebert
- German New Guinea (Deutsch-Neuguinea) – Hugo Rüdiger to 17 August, then from 22 September Curt von Hagen (both Landeshauptleute of the German New Guinea Company)
- German South-West Africa (Deutsch-Südwestafrika) – Theodor Leutwein (Landeshauptleute)
- Togoland – August Köhler (Landeshauptleute)

== Events ==
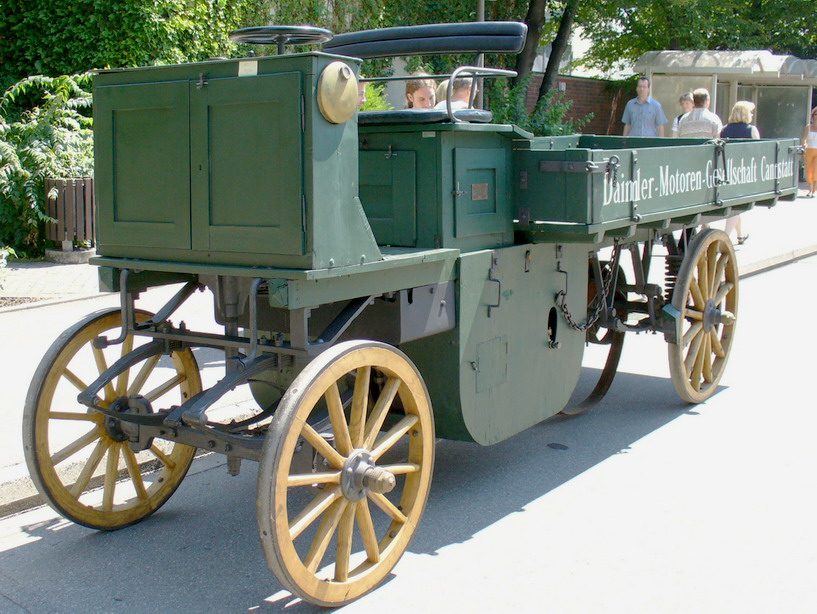
Model of a DMG Lastwagen, 1896, first gasoline truck

- 12 April – German football club Hannover 96 is founded.
- 1 June – Institut für Serumforschung und Serumprüfung in Berlin is opened.

=== Undated ===
- Gottlieb Daimler produces the first gasoline truck.
- Emperor William Monument in Porta Westfalica is completed.
- German physicist Wilhelm Wien derives the Wien approximation.

== Births ==
- 11 January – Heinrich Stuhlfauth, German football player and goalkeeper (died 1966)
- 4 February – Friedrich Hund, German physicist (died 1997)
- 9 February – Erich Vagts, German politician (died 1980)
- 14 February – Werner Richard Heymann, German film composer (died 1961)
- 23 February – Herbert Weichmann, German politician (died 1983)
- 25 February – Ida Noddack, German chemist (died 1978)
- 2 March – Caesar von Hofacker, German colonel (died 1944)
- 22 March – Karl Dannemann, German actor (died 1945)
- 1 April – Wilhelm Sauter, German painter (died 1948)
- 13 May – Josias, Hereditary Prince of Waldeck and Pyrmont (died 1967)
- 20 May – Paul Kemp, German actor (died 1953)
- 9 June – Karl Sack, German jurist (died 1945)
- 16 July – Otmar Freiherr von Verschuer, German physician (died 1969)
- 23 July – Reinhold Frank, German lawyer (died 1945)
- 19 August – Josef Kammhuber, German general (died 1986)
- 23 August – Hubert von Meyerinck, German actor (died 1971)
- 15 September – Theodor Haubach, German journalist (died 1945)
- 14 October – Wolf-Heinrich Graf von Helldorff, German police officer and politician (died 1944)
- 18 October – Friedrich Hollaender, German film composer and author (died 1976)
- 30 October – Roma Bahn, German actress (died 1975)
- 9 November – Hellmut von der Chevallerie, German general (died 1965)
- 28 November – Otto Graf, German actor (died 1977)
- 3 December – Carlo Schmid, German politician (died 1979)
- 18 December – Hans Otto Erdmann, German officer (died 1944)
- 27 December – Carl Zuckmayer, German writer and playwright (died 1977)
- 31 December – Carl Ludwig Siegel, German mathematician (died 1981)

== Deaths ==
- 29 February – Albrecht von Stosch, German admiral (born 1818)
- 28 April – Heinrich von Treitschke, German historian (born 1834)
- 18 May – Otto von Camphausen, German politician (born 1812)
- 20 May – Clara Schumann, German musician and composer (born 1819)
- 2 June – Friedrich Gerhard Rohlfs, German geographer, explorer and author (born 1831)
- 11 July – Ernst Curtius, German archaeologist and historian (born 1814)
- 13 July – August Kekulé, German chemist (born 1829)
- 10 August – Otto Lilienthal, German pioneer of aviation (born 1848)
- 13 August – Philipp Ludwig von Seidel, German mathematician (born 1821)
- 22 October – Christian Roos, German bishop of Roman-Catholic Church (born 1826)
- 3 November – Eugen Baumann, German chemist (born 1846)
- 19 November – Otto Graf zu Stolberg-Wernigerode, German politician (born 1837)
- December – Bianka Blume, German opera singer (born 1843).
- 17 December – Paul Beiersdorf, German pharmacist (born 1836)
- 26 December — Emil du Bois-Reymond, German physiologist (born 1818)
