= 1894 in Germany =

- Decades: 1870s; 1880s; 1890s; 1900s; 1910s
- See also: Other events of 1894; History of Germany • Timeline • Years

Events in the year 1894 in Germany.

== Incumbents ==
=== National level ===
- Emperor – Wilhelm II
- Chancellor – Leo von Caprivi to 26 October, then from 29 October Chlodwig, Prince of Hohenlohe-Schillingsfürst

=== State level ===
==== Kingdoms ====
- King of Bavaria – Otto
- King of Prussia – Wilhelm II
- King of Saxony – Albert
- King of Württemberg – William II

==== Grand Duchies ====
- Grand Duke of Baden – Frederick I
- Grand Duke of Hesse – Ernest Louis
- Grand Duke of Mecklenburg-Schwerin – Frederick Francis III
- Grand Duke of Mecklenburg-Strelitz – Frederick William
- Grand Duke of Oldenburg – Peter II
- Grand Duke of Saxe-Weimar-Eisenach – Charles Alexander

==== Principalities ====
- Schaumburg-Lippe – George, Prince of Schaumburg-Lippe
- Schwarzburg-Rudolstadt – Günther Victor, Prince of Schwarzburg-Rudolstadt
- Schwarzburg-Sondershausen – Karl Günther, Prince of Schwarzburg-Sondershausen
- Principality of Lippe – Woldemar, Prince of Lippe
- Reuss Elder Line – Heinrich XXII, Prince Reuss of Greiz
- Reuss Younger Line – Heinrich XIV, Prince Reuss Younger Line
- Waldeck and Pyrmont – Friedrich, Prince of Waldeck and Pyrmont

==== Duchies ====
- Duke of Anhalt – Frederick I, Duke of Anhalt
- Duke of Brunswick – Prince Albert of Prussia (regent)
- Duke of Saxe-Altenburg – Ernst I, Duke of Saxe-Altenburg
- Duke of Saxe-Coburg and Gotha – Alfred, Duke of Saxe-Coburg and Gotha
- Duke of Saxe-Meiningen – Georg II, Duke of Saxe-Meiningen

==== Colonial Governors ====
- Cameroon (Kamerun) – Leist to 24 February, then Eugen von Zimmerer (4th and final term) to 31 December, then Jesko von Puttkamer (3rd term)
- German East Africa (Deutsch-Ostafrika) – Friedrich Radbod Freiher von Schele
- German New Guinea (Deutsch-Neuguinea) – Gerog Schmiele (Landeshauptleute of the German New Guinea Company)
- German South-West Africa (Deutsch-Südwestafrika) – Curt von François (Landeshauptleute) to 15 March, then Theodor Leutwein (Landeshauptleute)
- Togoland – Jesko von Puttkamer (Landeshauptleute) (2nd term)

== Events ==
- 1 October – Leipziger Volkszeitung is first published.

=== Undated ===
- The Reichstag building in Berlin is completed and opened.
- The German company Wintershall is founded.

== Births ==
- 8 February – Ludwig Marcuse, German philosopher (died 1971)
- 26 February – Wilhelm Bittrich, German Waffen SS general (died 1979)
- 11 March – Otto Grotewohl, German politician (died 1964)
- 1 April – Eduard Wagner, German general (died 1944)
- 11 April – Fritz Lindemann, German officer (died 1944)
- 14 April – Fritz Thiele, German member of the German resistance who served as the communications chief of the German Army (died 1944)
- 19 April – Adolf Wissel, German painter, an official artist of Nazism (died 1973)
- 19 May – Heinz Ziegler, German general (died 1972)
- 30 July – Gerda Müller, German actress (died 1951)
- 17 August – Otto Suhr, German politician (died 1957)
- 19 August – Joseph Müller, German Roman Catholic priest (died 1944)
- 20 August – Josef Straßberger, German weightlifter (died 1950)
- 6 September – Carl Grossberg, German painter (died 1940)
- 12 September – Friedrich Ebert Jr., German politician (died 1979)
- 15 September – Herbert Windt, German composer (died 1965)
- 14 October – Heinrich Lübke, German politician (died 1972)
- 2 November – Alexander Lippisch, German aeronautical engineer, pioneer of aerodynamics (died 1976)
- 19 November – Heinz Hopf, German mathematician (died 1971)
- 17 December – Hans Henny Jahnn, German playwright and novelist (died 1959)
- 19 December – Paul Dessau, German conductor and composer (died 1979)
- 21 December – Gustav Ehrhart, German chemist (died 1971)

== Deaths ==
- 1 January – Heinrich Hertz, German physicist (born 1857)
- 11 January:
  - Wilhelm von Freeden, German mathematician (born 1822)
  - Joseph Weyland, German bishop of Roman Catholic Church (born 1826)
- 12 February – Hans von Bülow, German conductor, virtuoso pianist, and composer (born 1830)
- 20 February – Georg Albert Lücke, German surgeon (born 1829)
- 11 April – Constantin Lipsius, German architect (born 1832)
- 21 May – August Kundt, German physicist (born 1839)
- 8 September – Hermann von Helmholtz, German physician (born 1821)
- 17 October – Ludwig von Henk, German naval officer (born 1820)
