= 1944 in Germany =

- Decades: 1920s; 1930s; 1940s; 1950s; 1960s
- See also: Other events of 1944; History of Germany • Timeline • Years

Events in the year 1944 in Germany.

== Incumbent ==
=== National level ===
Head of State and Chancellor

- Adolf Hitler (the Führer) (Nazi Party)

== Events ==
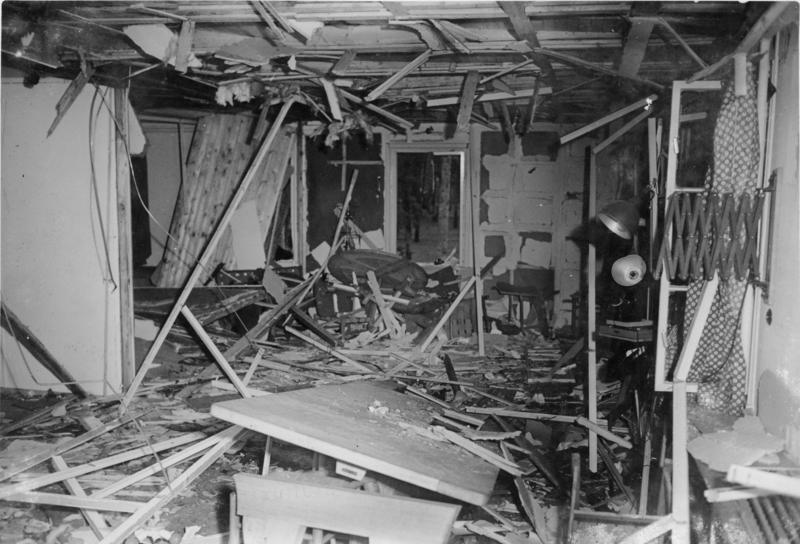
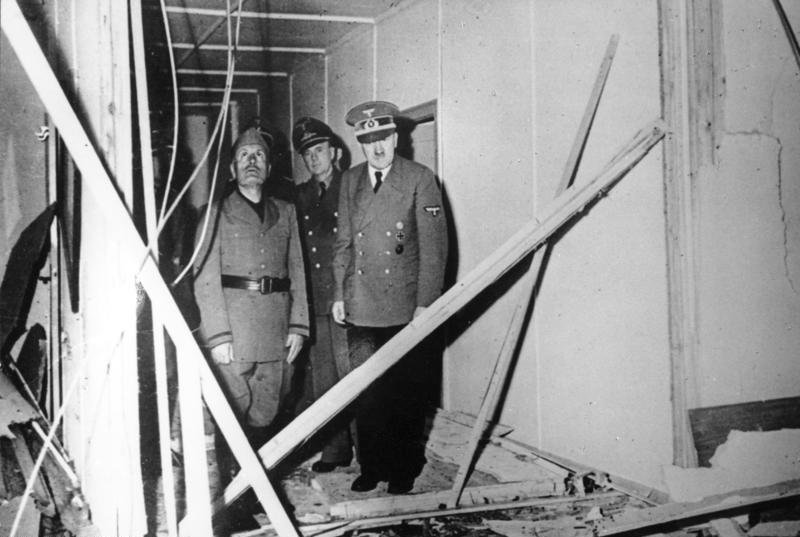
The aftermath of the failed 20 July plot to kill Hitler. Adolf Hitler and Benito Mussolini inspect the destroyed barracks of the Wolf's Lair.
- 4 January — World War II: The Battle of Monte Cassino begins.
- 20 January — World War II: The Royal Air Force drops 2,300 tons of bombs on Berlin.
- 27 January — World War II: The 3-year Siege of Leningrad is lifted.
- 29 January — World War II: The Battle of Cisterna takes place.
- 15 February — World War II – Battle of Monte Cassino: A monastery atop Monte Cassino is destroyed by Allied bombing.
- 20 February — World War II: The "Big Week" begins with American bomber raids on German aircraft manufacturing centers.
- 26 February — Holocaust: Shooting begins on the Nazi propaganda film, The Fuehrer Gives a Village to the Jews in Theresienstadt.
- 15 March — World War II: Battle of Monte Cassino: Allied aircraft bomb German-held monastery and stage an assault.
- 19 March — World War II: Germany's Panzerfaust occupy Hungary.
- 19–20 March — World War II: The Nazis execute over 200 prisoners, Soviet citizens and anti-fascist Romanians at Rîbnița.
- 23 March — World War II: Members of the Italian Resistance attack Nazis marching in Via Rasella, killing 33.
- 9 May — World War II: In the Ukrainian city of Sevastopol, Soviet troops completely drive out German forces, who had been ordered by Hitler to “fight to the last man.”
- 12 May — World War II: Soviet troops finalize the liberation of the Crimea.
- 15 May — Holocaust: Deportation of Hungarian Jews to Auschwitz begins.
- 18 May — World War II: Battle of Monte Cassino: The Germans evacuate Monte Cassino and Allied forces take the stronghold after a struggle that claimed 20,000 lives.
- June — German V-2 rockets on test from Peenemünde become the first man-made objects to enter space. By the end of the month, more than 380,000 Hungarian Jews have been transferred to concentration camps - around half of the country's Jewish population.
- 4 June — World War II: A hunter-killer group of the United States Navy captures the German submarine U-505, marking the first time a U.S. Navy vessel has captured an enemy vessel at sea since the 19th century.
- 5 June — World War II: More than 1,000 British bombers drop 5,000 tons of bombs on German gun batteries on the Normandy coast in preparation for D-Day.
- 5 June — The German Navy's Enigma messages are decoded almost in real time.
- 6 June — World War II: Battle of Normandy: Operation Overlord, commonly known as D-Day, commences with the landing of 155,000 Allied troops on the beaches of Normandy in France. The Allied soldiers quickly break through the Atlantic Wall and push inland, in the largest amphibious military operation in history. This operation helps liberate France from Germany, and also weakens the Nazi hold on Europe.
- 10 June — World War II: 642 men, women and children are killed in the Oradour-sur-Glane massacre in France.
- 13 June — World War II: Germany launches a V1 Flying Bomb attack on England.
- 22 June — World War II: Operation Bagration: A general attack by Soviet forces clears the German forces from Belarus, resulting in the destruction of German Army Group Centre, possibly the greatest defeat of the Wehrmacht during World War II.
- 3 July — World War II: Soviet troops liberate Minsk.
- 7 July — Holocaust: Hungarian Regent Horthy orders Jewish transports to Auschwitz halted; 437,000 Jews have already been deported, mostly to their deaths.
- 10 July — World War II: Soviet troops begin operations to occupy the Baltic countries.
- 31 July — World War II: Vilnius is liberated.
- 20 July — World War II: Adolf Hitler survives an assassination attempt, led by Claus von Stauffenberg.
- 24 July — Holocaust: Russian troops liberate the first concentration camp, at Majdanek, where 360,000 Jews have been exterminated.
- 1 August — World War II: The Warsaw Uprising begins.
- 2 August — World War II: Turkey ends diplomatic and economic relations with Germany.
- 4 August — Holocaust: A tip from a Dutch informer leads the Gestapo to a sealed-off area in an Amsterdam warehouse, where they find Jewish diarist Anne Frank and her family.
- 5 August — Holocaust: Polish insurgents liberate a German labor camp in Warsaw, freeing 348 Jewish prisoners.
- 6 August — Holocaust: Łódź, the last remaining Jewish ghetto in Poland, is liquidated and 60,000 Jews are sent to Auschwitz.
- 19 August — World War II: An insurrection starts in Paris.
- 20 August — World War II: American forces successfully defeat Nazi forces at Chambois, closing the Falaise Gap.
- 20 August — World War II: 168 captured allied airmen, including Phil Lamason, accused of being "terror fliers" by the Gestapo, arrive at Buchenwald concentration camp.
- 24 August — World War II: Liberation of Paris: The Allies enter Paris, successfully completing Operation Overlord.
- 25 August — World War II: German surrender of Paris: General Dietrich von Choltitz surrenders Paris to the Allies in defiance of Hitler's orders to destroy it.
- 25 August — World War II: Maillé massacre: Massacre of 129 civilians (70% women and children) by the Gestapo at Maillé, Indre-et-Loire.
- 25 August — World War II: Hungary decides to continue the war together with Germany.
- 3 September — World War II: The Allies liberate Brussels.
- 4 September — World War II: Finland breaks off relations with Germany.
- 8 September — World War II: London is hit by a V-2 rocket for the first time.
- 2 October — Holocaust: Nazi troops end the Warsaw Uprising.
- 7 October — Holocaust: A revolt by Jewish slave labourers at Auschwitz-Birkenau results in the complete destruction of Crematory IV.
- 10 October — Holocaust: Porajmos: 800 Romani children are systematically murdered at the Auschwitz death camp.
- 14 October — World War II: German Field Marshal Erwin Rommel commits suicide rather than face execution for allegedly conspiring against Adolf Hitler.
- 18 October — World War II: The Volkssturm is founded on Hitler's orders.
- 20 October — World War II: Belgrade is liberated by Yugoslav Partisans and the Red Army.
- 21 October — World War II: Aachen, the first German city to fall, is captured by American troops.
- 25 October — World War II: The Red Army liberates Kirkenes, the first town in Norway to be liberated.
- 30 October — Holocaust: The last gassings take places at Auschwitz.
- 25 November — Holocaust: Himmler orders the destruction of the crematories at Auschwitz.
- 16 December — World War II: Germany begins the Ardennes offensive, later known as Battle of the Bulge.
- 17 December — World War II: German troops carry out the Malmedy massacre.
- 19 December — World War II: The entire territory of Estonia is taken by the Red Army.
- 31 December — World War II: Hungary declares war on Germany.

== Births ==
- 4 January - Judy Winter, German actress
- 9 January - Harun Farocki, German filmmaker, author, and lecturer (died 2014)
- 12 January - Klaus Wedemeier, German politician
- 16 January - Thomas Fritsch, German actor (died 2021)
- 21 January — Hasso Plattner, German entrepreneur
- 24 January — Klaus Nomi, German singer (died 1983, USA)
- 31 January - Uwe Kockisch, German actor
- 5 February - Thekla Carola Wied, German actress
- 12 February - Ortwin Runde, German politician
- 28 February — Sepp Maier, German footballer
- 2 March — Uschi Glas, German actress
- 15 March - Josef Joffe, German publisher
- 20 March — Erwin Neher, German biophysicist
- 21 March — Gila von Weitershausen, German actress
- 24 March — Rebecca Horn, German visual artist (died 2024)
- 6 April - Bernd Spier, German singer (died 2017)
- 7 April
  - Christof Nel, German theatre and opera director (died 2024)
  - Gerhard Schröder, former Chancellor of Germany
- 16 April — Elmar Wepper, German actor (died 2023)
- 29 April - Hermann Scheer, German politician (died 2010)
- 30 April - Rudi Assauer, German football manager and player (died 2019)
- 1 May - Costa Cordalis, German singer (died 2019 in Spain)
- 3 May - Renate Blume, German actress
- 4 May - Monica Bleibtreu, German actress (died 2009)
- 13 May - Uwe Barschel, German politician (died 1987)
- 15 May - Ulrich Beck, German sociologist (died 2015)
- 16 May - Friedrich Schorlemmer, German theologian (died 2024)
- 6 June - Edgar Froese, German artist and electronic music pioneer (died 2015)
- 19 June - Amélie Mummendey, German social psychologist (died 2018)
- 22 June - Helmut Dietl, German film director and author
- 27 June - Paul Koslo, German-Canadian actor (died 2019, USA)
- 5 July - Hendrik Born, German vice admiral (died 2021)
- 6 July - Bernhard Schlink, German jurist and writer
- 7 July
  - Jürgen Grabowski, German footballer (died 2022)
  - Godehard Link, German philosopher
- 18 August - Volker Lechtenbrink, German singer (died 2021)
- 22 August - Peter Hofmann German singer (died 2010)
- 30 August – Wolf Roth, German actor
- 4 September — Rüdiger Mielke, German footballer
- 14 September
  - Günter Netzer, German footballer
  - Martin Sperr, German dramatist and actor (died 2002)
- 15 September — Jürgen E. Schrempp, German businessman
- 18 September — Gunther Emmerlich, German operatic bass (died 2023)
- 19 September — Friedrich Christian Flick, German businessman and art collector
- 20 September — Josef Bille, German physicist (died 2023)
- 24 September
  - Bernd Bransch, German footballer (died 2022)
  - Diana Körner, German actress
- 27 September - Helmut Kosmehl, German handball player
- 29 September - Lerke Osterloh, German judge
- 30 September - Bernd Meinunger, German lyricist and record producer
- 3 October - Roy Horn, German-born American magician and entertainer (died 2000 in the United States)
- 14 October - Udo Kier, German actor
- 18 October - Harry Blum, German politician (died 2020 in the United States)
- 28 October - Anton Schlecker, German businessman
- 29 October - Barbara Stamm, German politician (died 2022)
- 12 November - Liesel Westermann, German discus thrower
- 15 November - Joy Fleming, German singer (died 2017)
- 18 November - Ibrahim Böhme, German politician (died 1999)
- 18 November — Wolfgang Joop, German artist, fashion designer and art collector
- 2 December - Botho Strauß, German novelist and playwright
- 14 December - Michael Glos, German politician
- 24 December - Erhard Keller, German speed skater
- Date not known
  - Inge Solbrig, German actress

== Deaths ==
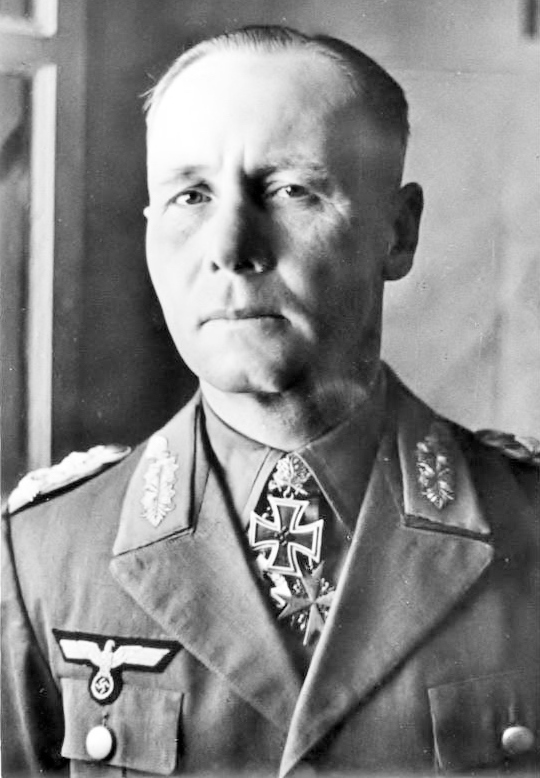
Erwin Rommel

- 9 January - Kurt Hasse, German equestrian (born 1907)
- 11 February — Carl Meinhof, German linguist (born 1857)
- 18 February - Hermann Blau, German engineer and chemist, and inventor of Blau gas (born 1871)
- 3 March - Anton Geiss, German politician (born 1858)
- 15 March - Otto von Below, German general (born 1857)
- 5 April — Isolde Kurz, German painter (born 1853)
- 8 April — Maria Bard, German actress (born 1900)
- 9 April — Johann Trollmann, German boxer (born 1907)
- 13 April - Hugo Graf von und zu Lerchenfeld auf Köfering und Schönberg, German politician (born 1871)
- 21 April — Hans-Valentin Hube, German army general (born 1890)
- 5 May — Bertha Benz, German automotive pioneer (born 1849)
- 6 June - Wilhelm Falley, German general (born 1897)
- 20 June - Toni Merkens, German cyclist (born 1912)
- 23 June — Thomas-Emil von Wickede, Wehrmacht general and Knight's Cross recipient (born 1893)
- 20 July — Ludwig Beck, German general and Chief of the German General Staff (born 1880)
- 21 July
  - Heinz Brandt (born 1907)
  - Werner von Haeften (born 1908)
  - Hans-Ulrich von Oertzen, German resistance member (born 1915)
  - Friedrich Olbricht (born 1888)
  - Albrecht Mertz von Quirnheim (born 1905)
  - Claus von Stauffenberg, German military and resistance fighter (born 1907)
  - Henning von Tresckow (born 1901)
- 22 July — Günther Korten, German Colonel General and Chief of the General Staff of the Luftwaffe in World War II. (born 1898)
- 23 July
  - Max Nettlau, German historian (born 1865)
  - Eduard Wagner, general in the Army of Nazi Germany who served as quartermaster-general (born 1894)
- 26 July — Wessel Freytag von Loringhoven, colonel in the High Command of the German Armed Forces (born 1899)
- 28 July — Werner Schrader, German resistance member (born 1895)
- 8 August
  - Robert Bernardis, German resistance fighter (born 1908)
  - Albrecht von Hagen, German resistance fighter (born 1904)
  - Paul von Hase, German army officer and resistance member (born 1885)
  - Erich Hoepner, German general (born 1886)
  - Hellmuth Stieff, German resistance fighter (born 1901)
  - Michael Wittmann, German tank commander (born 1914)
  - Erwin von Witzleben, German field marshal (born 1881)
  - Peter Yorck von Wartenburg, German resistance fighter (born 1904)
- 10 August
  - Alfred Kranzfelder, German resistance fighter (born 1908)
  - Hans Albrecht, Hereditary Prince of Schleswig-Holstein (born 1917)
  - Fritz-Dietlof von der Schulenburg, German resistance fighter (born 1902)
  - Berthold Schenk Graf von Stauffenberg, Nazi opponent and lawyer (b. 1905)
- 15 August
  - Egbert Hayessen, German resistance fighter (born 1913)
  - Hans Bernd von Haeften, German resistance fighter (born 1905)
  - Wolf-Heinrich Graf von Helldorff, German police chief and resistance fighter (born 1896)
- 17 August — Günther von Kluge, German field marshal (born 1882)
- 18 August - Ernst Thälmann, German politician (born 1886)
- 19 August - Günther von Kluge, German field marshal (born 1882)
- 21 August - Friedrich Gustav Jaeger, German resistance fighter (born 1895)
- 23 August - Carl Moritz, German architect (born 1863)
- 26 August
  - Otto Kiep, German resistance fighter (born 1886)
  - Hans Georg Klamroth, German resistance fighter (born 1898)
  - Ludwig Freiherr von Leonrod, German resistance fighter (born 1906)
  - Adam von Trott zu Solz, German diplomat (executed) (born 1909)
- 27 August — Georg von Boeselager, German nobleman and officer in the Wehrmacht (born 1915)
- 28 August — Rudolf Breitscheid, German politician (born 1874)
- 30 August
  - Eberhard Finckh, German resistance fighter (born 1899)
  - Hans Otfried von Linstow, German resistance fighter (born 1899)
  - Carl-Heinrich von Stülpnagel, German general and resistance leader (born 1886)
- 3 September — Friedrich Alpers, German Nazi politician and general (born 1901)
- 4 September
  - Erich Fellgiebel, German Army general and resistance fighter (born 1886)
  - Heinrich Graf von Lehndorff-Steinort, German resistance fighter (born 1909)
  - Fritz Thiele, German resistance fighter, communications chief of the German Army (born 1894)
- 8 September
  - Georg Hansen, German resistance fighter (born 1904)
  - Ulrich von Hassell, German diplomat and resistance fighter (born 1881)
  - Paul Lejeune-Jung, German resistance fighter (born 1882)
  - Ulrich Wilhelm Graf Schwerin von Schwanenfeld, German resistance fighter (born 1902)
  - Günther Smend, German resistance fighter (born 1912)
  - Josef Wirmer, German resistance fighter (born 1901)
- 11 September - Joseph Müller, German Roman Catholic priest and Servant of God (born 1894)
- 14 September
  - Michael Graf von Matuschka, German resistance fighter (born 1888)
  - Heinrich Graf zu Dohna-Schlobitten, German major general and resistance fighter (born 1882)
  - Nikolaus von Üxküll-Gyllenband, German resistance fighter (born 1877)
  - Hermann Josef Wehrle, German Catholic priest and resistance member (born 1899)
- 16 September — Gustav Bauer, Chancellor of Germany (born 1870)
- 17 September — Friedrich Zickwolff, Wehrmacht general (born 1893)
- 18 September — Anton Saefkow, German communist (born 1903)
- 20 September — Friedrich Boedicker, German admiral (born 1866)
- 22 September — Fritz Lindemann, German officer in the Wehrmacht (born 1894)
- 28 September — Josef Bürckel, German Nazi gauleiter (born 1895
- 29 September
  - Otto Herfurth, Wehrmacht general, Knight's Cross recipient and 20 July Plot conspirator (born 1893)
  - Wilhelm Leuschner German politician and resistance fighter (born 1895
  - Joachim Meichssner, German resistance fighter (born 1906)
  - Joachim Sadrozinski, German resistance fighter (born 1907)
- 1 October — Rudolf Schmundt, German officer in the Wehrmacht and adjutant to Adolf Hitler (born 1896)
- 7 October - Diego von Bergen, German diplomat (born 1872)
- 12 October — Carl Langbehn, German resistance member (born 1901)
- 13 October
  - Hans-Jürgen von Blumenthal, German resistance member (born 1907)
  - Roland von Hößlin, German resistance member (born 1915)
- 14 October — Erwin Rommel, Wehrmacht Field Marshal (born 1891)
- 17 October — Anton Hafner, German aviator (born 1918)
- 18 October — Alexander, Prince of Erbach-Schönberg, German prince (born 1872)
- 19 October - Erich Koch-Weser, German lawyer and politician (born 1875)
- 20 October
  - Eduard Brücklmeier, German diplomat and resistance member (born 1903)
  - Hermann Maaß, German politician and resistance member (born 1897
  - Adolf Reichwein, German politician and resistance member (born 1898
- 24 October — Karl Freiherr von Thüngen, German general in the Wehrmacht (born 1893)
- 26 October - Joseph Fischer, German cartographer (born 1856)
- 27 October – Judith Auer, German World War II resistance fighter (born 1905)
- 28 October - Kurt Gerron, German actor (born 1897)
- 7 November - Max Bergmann, German biochemist (born 1886)
- 10 November - Friedrich Werner von der Schulenburg, German diplomat (born 1875)
- 12 November - Otto Frank, German physiologist (born 1865)
- 13 November
  - Paul Graener, German composer and conductor (born 1872)
  - Friedrich Lorenz, German Roman Catholic priest and blessed (born 1897
- 14 November
  - Walter Cramer, German resistance member (born 1886)
  - Bernhard Letterhaus, German trade unionist and resistance member (born 1897)
  - Ferdinand von Lüninck, German politician and resistance member (born 1888
- 19 November - Ludwig Dettmann, painter (born 1865)
- 30 November
  - Lilo Gloeden, German resistance member (born 1903)
  - Max Halbe, German dramatist (born 1865)
- 19 December — Rudolph Karstadt, German entrepreneur (born 1856)
- 20 December
  - Caesar von Hofacker, German Lieutenant Colonel and member of the 20 July plot against Adolf Hitler (born 1896)
- Fritz Pfeffer, German-Dutch housemate of Anne Frank (born 1889)
  - Carl Wentzel, German resistance member (born 1875)
