= Erich Weise =

German archivist and historian (1895 – 1972)

Erich Weise (4 September 1895 – 10 April 1972) was a German historian and archivist. During World War II, as a member of the Nazi Party, he administered Polish archives captured by Nazi Germany. In this position he purged people he considered "non-Aryans", used Jewish slave labor, and committed the war crime of plundering Polish historical documents.

== Early life and education ==
Weise was born in Krefeld in the Rhineland, the son of Julius Weise, a Gymnasium teacher, and raised in Königsberg in East Prussia (now Kaliningrad, in Russia), where he studied at the Albertina. At the outbreak of World War I in 1914 he was captured in Mitau, and he spent three years in Russian internment, during which his hearing was damaged; he eventually became deaf.

After the war he resumed his studies in Königsberg. In 1921 he qualified as a secondary school teacher; due to illness, he never worked in the profession. In the same year he received his Ph.D. in history, with a dissertation on the Diocese of Samland. He studied under Albert Brackmann, a leading proponent of German expansionism in the East for the purpose of acquiring Lebensraum and of the Ostforschung movement in historiography, which represented Germans as having brought order and civilization to the Slavic lands and was particularly anti-Polish.

== Interwar years ==
Weise began his career as an archivist in Berlin in 1922, where he remained until 1927, then moving to Düsseldorf. In 1930, at the instigation of Brackmann, he returned to Königsberg, where he was municipal archivist until 1935. In 1935 he was promoted to Staatsarchivrat and he subsequently worked as a division head in the Prussian Privy State Archives in Berlin.

Weise joined the Nazi Party in 1933 and became an official of the Reichsbund der Deutschen Beamten, the Nazi civil service organization. In 1933 he co-wrote an article with Nazi historian Erich Maschke and archivist Kurt Forstreuter. In 1933, at a conference of archivists in Königsberg where Brackmann also spoke promoting Ostforschung, Weise declared loyalty to the Third Reich and its ideas on behalf of all German archivists:

The initial aversion of the German archivist against engaging in political matters has waned. As the keeper of the legal codes of the state and the nation, he has become the herald of the national cause... Because Germandom (Volkstum) and the spirit of the state and the decisive will for ethnic (völkisch) survival have to be kept alive, the German archivists are fully behind the new Germany of January 30, 1933. In the spirit of the Third Reich, they work with the Volk for the Volk.

== Second World War ==
At the start of World War II in 1939, Weise was sent to the Polish Central Archives of Historical Records in Warsaw, where he was part of the administration of the captured archives under the Nazi occupation. In this function he purged archive staff of workers deemed "non-Aryan" and politically undesirable, reducing numbers by 50%, an accomplishment of which he was proud.

In spring 1940, Weise informed the remaining Polish archivists that all records from territories annexed from Poland by Nazi Germany would be confiscated. In 1942 he became head of a new archival institution founded by the Nazis in Poznań. In 2008 Polish authorities documented the fact that in December 1940, together with Forstreuter, Weise looted 74 documents dating from the 13th through the 15th centuries from an archive in Warsaw, a war crime. By that time both Forstreuter and Weise had died and Polish authorities were unable to prosecute them. He also used Jewish forced labor to transport archives.

== Post-war career ==
According to historian Astrid M. Eckert, Weise was initially classified as a "reported looter" by the Monuments Fine Arts and Archives Section of the Allied Military Government in Germany (MFAA), but during denazification succeeded in lying and suppressing information to portray himself as an opponent of the Nazis.

In 1947 he went to work for the State Archives of Lower Saxony in Hanover, in the British occupation zone, where a number of other former Nazi archivists also worked. From 1959 until his retirement in 1960, he was the director of the archives in Stade (Staatsarchiv Stade). He died in Hanover in 1972.

== Research and publications ==
Weise's primary research areas were the history of the Teutonic Order and the history of Prussia. On the former, he published a three-volume edition of 15th-century documents, but modern historians consider his views outdated. The 1966 book Ost- und Westpreußen (East and West Prussia) edited by Weise and published as one volume of the encyclopedia Handbuch der historischen Stätten Deutschlands (Handbook of the Historical Places of Germany) was criticized in Poland, especially in light of the background of the authors, who included Erich Keyser, known for his incitement of hatred towards Poles before the Second World War. Historian Michael Burleigh notes that during the Cold War, Weise continued to publish in the mode of Ostforschung, for example in a 1955 book on the right of resistance in later medieval Prussia. His work has been criticized in Poland for neglecting political and social aspects of the territories he described while focusing on their German character.

== Publications (selection) ==
=== As author or compiler ===
- "Sammelbesprechung über neuere polnische Literatur". Altpreußische Forschungen 10, 1933, p. 148.
- Die alten Preußen. Elbing: Preußen-Verlag, 1934. Rev. ed. 1936. OCLC 12096975.
- Die Staatsverträge des deutschen Ordens in Preußen im 15. Jahrhundert. Historische Kommission für ost- und westpreußische Landesforschung. Three volumes:
  - Vol. 1: 1398–1437. Königsberg: Gräfe und Unzer, 1939.
  - Vol. 2: 1438–1467. Marburg (Lahn): Elwert, 1955.
  - Vol. 3: 1467–1497. Munich: Gräfe und Unzer, 1966.
- Deutsches Schrifterbe im Warthegau: Ein Kriegsjahr Archivpflege. 1944.
- Das Widerstandsrecht im Ordenslande Preussen und das mittelalterliche Europa. Göttingen: Vandenhoeck & Ruprecht, 1955.
- Die Schwabensiedlungen im Posener Kammerdepartement 1799–1804. Würzburg: Holzner, 1961.
- Geschichte des Niedersächsischen Staatsarchivs in Stade nebst Übersicht seiner Bestände. Göttingen: Vandenhoeck & Ruprecht, 1964.
- Die Amtsgewalt von Papst und Kaiser und die Ostmission besonders in der 1. Hälfte des 13. Jahrhunderts. Marburg (Lahn): Herder Institute, 1971.
- Findbuch zum Bestand 27 Reichskammergericht (1500–1648). Edited with Heinz-Joachim Schulze. Göttingen: Vandenhoeck & Ruprecht, 1981, ISBN 3-525-85960-0.

=== As editor ===
- Ost- und Westpreußen. Handbuch der historischen Stätten Deutschlands Vol. 317. Stuttgart: Kröner Verlag, 1966. Repr. 1981. ISBN 3-520-31701-X.

== See also ==
- Nazi Plunder
- World War II looting of Poland
