= 1986 in Germany =

- Decades: 1960s; 1970s; 1980s; 1990s; 2000s
- See also: Other events of 1986; History of Germany • Timeline • Years

Events in the year 1986 in Germany.

== Incumbents ==
- President - Richard von Weizsäcker
- Chancellor – Helmut Kohl

== Events ==
- 14–25 February - 36th Berlin International Film Festival
- 27 March - Germany in the Eurovision Song Contest 1986
- 8 June - East German general election, 1986
- 15 June - 1986 Lower Saxony state election
- July - Launch of the second generation BMW 7 Series.
- September - Launch of the third generation Audi 80.
- 17 October - Launch of the all-new Opel Omega, which succeeds the Opel Rekord.
- December - The Opel Omega is voted European Car of the Year, with the Audi 80 coming second in the contest and the BMW 7 Series coming third.
- German company Volkswagen Group acquired a controlling stake in Spanish company SEAT.

== Births ==
=== January ===
- 2 January – Nicole Reinhardt, Olympic canoeist
- 6 January – Benjamin Simm, rugby player
- 13 January – Laura Ludwig, Olympic beach volleyball player

=== February ===
- 16 February – Jessica von Bredow-Werndl, Olympic dressage rider

=== March ===
- 5 March – Constantin von Jascheroff, actor
- 27 March – Manuel Neuer, footballer

=== April ===
- 11 April – Lena Schöneborn, Olympic pentathlete

=== June ===
- 4 June – Fahriye Evcen, German-born Turkish actress
- 5 June – Christian Baracat, rugby player
- 11 June – Sebastian Bayer, Olympic long jumper

=== July ===
- 20 July – Andreas Kümmert, singer
- 25 July – Robert Dietrich, ice hockey player (d. 2011)
- 30 July – Arthur Abele, Olympic decathlete

=== August ===
- 7 August – Paul Biedermann, Olympic swimmer
- 17 August – Tobias Schönenberg, actor and model
- 26 August – Kerstin Thiele, Olympic judoka

=== September ===
- 23 September – Gina-Lisa Lohfink, actress and model

=== October ===
- 9 October – Dave Grunewald, singer, podcaster, fitness expert, and co-frontman for Annisokay (2011–2019)
- 26 October – René Rast, racing driver
- 28 October – Kristina Bröring-Sprehe, Olympic equestrian

=== November ===
- 5 November – Axel Tischer, wrestler
- 12 November – Robert Müller, footballer
- 22 November – Verena Schäffer, politician

=== December ===
- 9 December – Miriam Welte, Olympic cyclist
- 12 December – Kirsikka Lansmann, politician
- 13 December – Christian Engelhart, racing driver

== Deaths ==
- January 23 - Joseph Beuys, artist (born 1921)
- January 25 - Josef Kammhuber, general (born 1896)
- January 25 - Ernst Schnabel, German writer (born 1913)
- January 27 – Lilli Palmer, actress (born 1914)
- February 3 — Alfred Vohrer, German film director and actor (born 1914)
- March 11 - Herbert Runge, German boxer (born 1913)
- March 13 - Eugen Gerstenmaier, German politician (born 1906)
- March 17 - Heinz Nixdorf, German computing pioneer, businessman and founder of Nixdorf Computer AG (born 1925)
- June 9 - Elisabeth Selbert, politician and lawyer (born 1896)
- July 14 - Joseph Vogt, classical historian (born 1895)
- July 24 - Willy Kaiser, German boxer (born 1912)
- August 3 - Otmar Emminger, German economist (born 1911)
- September 30 - Franz Burda I, German publisher (born 1903)
- October 4 — Arno von Lenski, German officer (born 1893)
- October 30 - Fritz Tillmann, German actor (born 1910)
- October 30 - Elisabeth Schwarzhaupt, German politician (born 1901)
- November 12 - Ria Baran, German pair skater (born 1922)
- December 2 - Heinrich Amersdorffer, German painter and printmaker (born 1905)
- December 12 - Paul Verner, politician (born 1911)
- December 19 - Werner Dankwort, German diplomat (born 1895)

== See also ==
- 1986 in German television
