= 1981 in Germany =

- Decades: 1960s; 1970s; 1980s; 1990s; 2000s
- See also: Other events of 1981; History of Germany • Timeline • Years

Events in the year 1981 in Germany.

== Incumbents ==
- President — Karl Carstens
- Chancellor — Helmut Schmidt

== Events ==
- 13–24 February - 31st Berlin International Film Festival
- 28 February - Germany in the Eurovision Song Contest 1981
- 14 June - East German general election, 1981
- 1 August — Launch of the MK2 Volkswagen Polo, which makes use of a larger estate-like bodyshell, although it is still marketed as a hatchback.
- 23 September — Launch of the new Opel Ascona, which for the first time is available with a hatchback and front-wheel drive, as well as a new range of engines.
- 29 October — Raiders of the Lost Ark in movie theaters in Germany.
- December — The Volkswagen Polo and Opel Ascona miss out on the European Car of the Year award, which instead goes to the Renault 9 from France.
- Date unknown - Museum für Moderne Kunst in Frankfurt was founded, although it was not opened to the public until 1991.

=== Science ===
- Date unknown - German research team led by Peter Armbruster and Gottfried Münzenberg at the GSI Helmholtz Centre for Heavy Ion Research (GSI Helmholtzzentrum für Schwerionenforschung) in Darmstadt bombarded a target of bismuth-209 with accelerated nuclei of chromium-54 to produce 5 atoms of the isotope bohrium-262

== Births ==
- January 21 — Dany Heatley, hockey player
- February 23 — Jan Böhmermann, television presenter
- March 8 - Timo Boll, table tennis player
- March 11 - Matthias Schweighöfer, actor
- March 12 - Friedrich Mücke, German actor
- April 26 - Teresa Weißbach, German actress
- April 27 — Sandy Mölling, pop singer
- May 15 - Ben, German singer
- May 21 - Maximilian Mutzke, drummer and singer
- June 3 - Timur Tekkal, rugby player
- June 12 - Nora Tschirner, German actress
- July 21 — Stefan Schumacher, cyclist
- August 4 - Florian Silbereisen, singer
- August 18 - Jan Frodeno, triathlete
- August 22 - Christina Obergföll, athlete
- August 30 - André Niklaus, athlete
- September 7 - Hannah Herzsprung, actress
- October 2 - Ronald Rauhe, canoeist

== Deaths ==
- 8 January — Mortimer von Kessel, Wehrmacht general (born 1893)
- February 22 - Curtis Bernhardt, film director (born 1899)
- March 5 – Gertraud Winkelvoss, German neo-Nazi politician (born 1917)
- March 7 - Hilde Krahwinkel Sperling, German tennis player (born 1908)
- April 4 — Carl Ludwig Siegel, mathematician (born 1896)
- April 20 — Hans Söhnker, actor (born 1903)
- May 9 — Fritz Umgelter, television director, writer and film director (born 1922)
- May 13 - Joseph-Ernst Graf Fugger von Glött, German politician (born 1895)
- May 18 - Eleonore Baur, German Nazi, only woman to participate in Munich Beer Hall Putsch (born 1885)
- June 4 - Fritz Steuben, German author (born 1898)
- June 16 - Julius Ebbinghaus, German philosopher (born 1885)
- July 5 — Helmut Gröttrup, electrical engineer (born 1916)
- July 19 - Karl Steinhoff, German politician (born 1892)
- August 23 - Rolf Herricht, German actor and comedian (born 1927)
- October 29 - Carl Joseph Leiprecht, German bishop of Roman Catholic Church (born 1903)
- November 22 - Hans Adolf Krebs, German physician and biochem (born 1900)
- December 31 — Gunther Krappe, Wehrmacht officer (born 1893)

== See also ==
- 1981 in German television
