= 1891 in Germany =

- Decades: 1870s; 1880s; 1890s; 1900s; 1910s
- See also: Other events of 1891; History of Germany • Timeline • Years

Events in the year 1891 in Germany.

== Incumbents ==
=== National level ===
- Emperor – Wilhelm II
- Chancellor – Leo von Caprivi

=== State level ===
==== Kingdoms ====
- King of Bavaria – Otto
- King of Prussia – Wilhelm II
- King of Saxony – Albert
- King of Württemberg – Charles to 6 October, then William II

==== Grand Duchies ====
- Grand Duke of Baden – Frederick I
- Grand Duke of Hesse – Louis IV
- Grand Duke of Mecklenburg-Schwerin – Frederick Francis III
- Grand Duke of Mecklenburg-Strelitz – Frederick William
- Grand Duke of Oldenburg – Peter II
- Grand Duke of Saxe-Weimar-Eisenach – Charles Alexander

==== Principalities ====
- Schaumburg-Lippe – Adolf I, Prince of Schaumburg-Lippe
- Schwarzburg-Rudolstadt – Günther Victor, Prince of Schwarzburg-Rudolstadt
- Schwarzburg-Sondershausen – Karl Günther, Prince of Schwarzburg-Sondershausen
- Principality of Lippe – Woldemar, Prince of Lippe
- Reuss Elder Line – Heinrich XXII, Prince Reuss of Greiz
- Reuss Younger Line – Heinrich XIV, Prince Reuss Younger Line
- Waldeck and Pyrmont – George Victor, Prince of Waldeck and Pyrmont

==== Duchies ====
- Duke of Anhalt – Frederick I, Duke of Anhalt
- Duke of Brunswick – Prince Albert of Prussia (regent)
- Duke of Saxe-Altenburg – Ernst I, Duke of Saxe-Altenburg
- Duke of Saxe-Coburg and Gotha – Ernst II, Duke of Saxe-Coburg and Gotha
- Duke of Saxe-Meiningen – Georg II, Duke of Saxe-Meiningen

==== Colonial Governors ====
- Cameroon (Kamerun) – from 7 August Bruno von Schuckmann (acting governor)
- German East Africa (Deutsch-Ostafrika) – Hermann Wissmann (commissioner) (1st term) to 21 February, then Julius Freiherr von Soden (with ... Rüdiger, acting governor)
- German New Guinea (Deutsch-Neuguinea) – Fritz Rose (commissioner)
- German South-West Africa (Deutsch-Südwestafrika) – Louis Nels (acting commissioner) to March, then Curt von François (commissioner)
- Togoland – Eugen von Zimmerer (commissioner) to 14 April, then vacant

== Events ==
- 23–24 January – 1891 European Figure Skating Championships in Hamburg

=== Undated ===
- German company Dr. Oetker is founded in Bielefeld.
- Robert Koch Institute is founded in Berlin.
- International Electrotechnical Exhibition in Frankfurt am Main
- The modern taximeter is invented by German Friedrich Wilhelm Gustav Bruhn.
- The Fischer projection is devised by Hermann Emil Fischer.
- August Thyssen and Joseph Thyssen found German steel company Thyssen.

== Births ==
- 8 January – Walther Bothe, German physicist (died 1957)
- 22 January – Bruno Loerzer, German aviator and air force general (died 1960)
- 24 January – Walter Model, German field marshal (died 1945)
- 27 January – Wilhelm Morgner, German painter (died 1917)
- 31 January – Kurt von Plettenberg, German forester (died 1945)
- 14 February – Erich Engel, film and theatre director (died 1966)
- 15 February – Josef Wintrich, German judge (died 1958)
- 17 February – Abraham Fraenkel, Israeli mathematician and Zionist (died 1965)
- 3 March – Fritz Rumey, German World War I fighter ace (died 1918)
- 11 March – Gertrud Wolle, German film actress (died 1952)
- 12 March – Hermann Stenner, German painter (died 1914)
- 24 March – Rudolf Berthold, German fighter pilot (died 1920)
- 28 March – Peter Suhrkamp, German publisher (died 1959)
- 2 April – Max Ernst, German painter (died 1976)
- 10 May – Anton Dostler, German general (died 1945)
- 13 May – Fritz Rasp, German actor (died 1976)
- 13 May – Wilhelm Weskamm, German bishop of Roman Catholic Church (died 1956)
- 16 May – Adolf Ritter von Tutschek, German fighter ace (died 1918)
- 18 May – Rudolf Carnap, German philosopher (died 1970)
- 22 May – Johannes R. Becher, German politician, poet and novelist (died 1958)
- 21 June - Hermann Scherchen, German conductor (died 1966)
- 14 July – Fritz Kampers, German actor (died 1950)
- 14 July – Werner Rittberger, German figure skater (died 1975)
- 29 July – Bernhard Zondek, Israeli gynecologist, developer of first reliable pregnancy test (died 1966)
- 7 August – Johannes Joseph van der Velden, German bishop of Roman Catholic Church (died 1954)
- 4 September – Fritz Todt, German engineer (died 1942)
- 16 September – Karl Dönitz, German admiral who played a major role in the naval history of World War II (died 1980)
- 22 September – Hans Albers, German actor (died 1960)
- 9 October – Kurt von Tippelskirch, German general (died 1957)
- 22 October – Carl-Hans Graf von Hardenberg, German politician and landowner (died 1958)
- 25 October – Karl Elmendorff, German conductor (died 1962)
- 14 November – Josef Magnus Wehner, German poet and playwright (died 1973)
- 15 November – Erwin Rommel, German field marshal (died 1944)
- 16 November – Julius Leber, German politician (died 1945)
- 2 December – Otto Dix, German painter and forced Volkssturm conscript (died 1969)
- 6 December – Gotthard Sachsenberg, German World War I naval aviator and fighter ace (died 1961)
- 10 December – Nelly Sachs, German poet and playwright (died 1970)
- 17 December – Karl Emil Schäfer, German World War I fighter ace (died 1917)

== Deaths ==
- 26 January – Nicolaus Otto, German engineer and inventor (born 1832)
- 27 February – Karl Eduard Heusner, German admiral (born 1843)
- 14 March – Ludwig Windthorst, German politician (born 1812)
- 24 April – Helmuth von Moltke the Elder, German field marshal, chief of staff of the Prussian Army for thirty years (born 1800)
- 22 May – Ernst Julius Hähnel, German sculptor (born 1811)
- 23 June – Wilhelm Eduard Weber, chemist (born 1804)
- 21 June – Paul Bronsart von Schellendorff, general (born 1832)
- 6 October – Charles I, King of Württemberg (born 1823)
- 14 December – Ferdinand von Roemer, German geologist (born 1818)
- 29 December – Leopold Kronecker, German mathematician (born 1823)
