= 1979 in German television =

This is a list of German television related events from 1979.

== Events ==
- 17 March - Dschinghis Khan are selected to represent Germany at the 1979 Eurovision Song Contest with their song "Dschinghis Khan". They are selected to be the twenty-fourth German Eurovision entry during Ein Lied für Jerusalem held at the Rudi-Sedlmayer-Halle in Munich.

== Debuts ==
=== ARD ===
- 8 January –
  - Heidi (1979)
  - Spaß muß sein (1979–1983)
- 8 February – Erlesene Verbrechen und makellose Morde (1979)
- 10 March – Die Koblanks (1979)
- 1 April – Jerusalem, Jerusalem (1979)
- 24 April – Zwei Mann um einen Herd (1979)
- 14 May –
  - Theodor Chindler (1979)
  - Vorsicht! Frisch gewachst! (1979)
- 30 June – Fast wia im richtigen Leben (1979–1988)
- 11 July – Die unsterblichen Methoden des Franz Josef Wanninger (1979–1982)
- 24 July – Tochter des Schweigens (1979)
- 20 August – Kümo Henriette (1979–1982)
- 27 August – Iron Gustav (1979)
- 17 September – Spaß beiseite - Herbert kommt! (1979–1981)
- 20 September – Die Magermilchbande (1979)
- 24 September – Parole Chicago (1979)
- 30 September – The Great Runaway (1979)
- 15 October – The Buddenbrooks (1979)
- 18 October – Der Millionenbauer (1979–1988)
- 30 October – Zimmer frei – UNO-Nähe (1979–1980)
- 9 November – St. Pauli-Landungsbrücken (1979–1982)
- 15 November – Der ganz normale Wahnsinn (1979–1980)
- 16 November – Anna (1979–1981)
- 18 December – Das verbotene Spiel (1979)
- Unknown – Freundinnen (1979)

=== ZDF ===
- 7 January – Pusteblume (1979–1980)
- 8 January – Die Protokolle des Herrn M (1979)
- 23 April – Achtung Kunstdiebe (1979)
- 30 April – Union der festen Hand (1979)
- 5 June – Der Sklave Calvisius (1979)
- 27 July – Locker vom Hocker (1979–1987)
- 6 September – Wie erziehe ich meinen Vater? (1979)
- 2 December – Mathias Sandorf (1979)
- 13 December – Der Bürgermeister (1979)
- 25 December – Timm Thaler (1979–1980)
- 26 December – Ein Kapitel für sich (1979–1980)

=== DFF ===
- 1 January – Spuk unterm Riesenrad (1979)
- 20 July – Ein offenes Haus (1979)

=== Armed Forces Network ===
- (United States) Dallas (1978–1991)

== Television shows ==
=== 1950s ===
- Tagesschau (1952–present)

=== 1960s ===
- heute (1963–present)

=== 1970s ===
- heute-journal (1978–present)
- Tagesthemen (1978–present)

== Births ==
- 29 January - Sarah Kuttner, TV host & author
