= 1975 in Germany =

- Decades: 1950s; 1960s; 1970s; 1980s; 1990s
- See also: Other events of 1975; History of Germany • Timeline • Years

Events in the year 1975 in Germany.

== Incumbents ==
- President – Walter Scheel
- Chancellor – Helmut Schmidt

== Events ==
- 25 February – German Constitutional Court abortion decision
- 27 February – The 2 June Movement kidnaps West German politician Peter Lorenz. He is released on March 4 after most of the kidnappers' demands are met.
- 27 June–8 July – 25th Berlin International Film Festival
- August: Fire on the Lüneburg Heath
- Date unknown
  - German company Coppenrath & Wiese was founded.
  - Launch of the Volkswagen Polo, a three-door hatchback which fits into the Volkswagen range below the Golf and is similar in size and concept to the Renault 5 from France.
  - The Flick affair begins with a share trade where the Flick company sold shares worth 1.9 Billion Deutsche Mark from Daimler AG to the Deutsche Bank.

== Births ==
- 13 February – Sabine Bätzing-Lichtenthäler, German politician
- 21 February – Daniel Fehlow, German actor
- 26 February – Frank Busemann, German decathlete
- 3 March – Johanna Wokalek, German actress
- 16 March – Sibylle Brauner, German alpine skier
- 23 March – Stefan Möller, German politician
- 13 April – Lou Bega, German singer
- 14 April –Tino Chrupalla, AfD German politician
- 7 May – Michael Kretschmer, German politician
- 4 June – Radost Bokel, German actress
- 23 June – Prince Daniel of Saxony, German nobleman
- 30 June – Ralf Schumacher, German racing driver
- 2 July –Maxim Mehmet, German actor
- 26 July – Ingo Schultz, German athlete
- 16 September – Petra Haltmayr, German alpine skier
- 22 September – Christian Ulmen, German entertainer and actor
- 19 October – Hilde Gerg, German ski alpine skier
- undated - Christoph Bach, German actor

== Deaths ==
- 5 January – Gottlob Berger, German Nazi senior official (born 1896)
- 11 January
  - Roma Bahn, German actress (born 1896)
  - Max Lorenz, German tenor (born 1901)
- 24 January – Erich Kempka, chauffeur of Adolf Hitler (born 1910)
- 2 February – Karl Maron, German politician (born 1903)
- 3 March – Therese Giehse, actress (born 1898)
- 22 March – Paul Verhoeven, actor, theatre and film director (born 1901)
- 1 April – Lorenz Jaeger, German cardinal of Roman Catholic Church (born 1892)
- 17 April – Philipp Albrecht, Duke of Württemberg, nobleman (born 1893)
- 17 June – Max Barthel, writer (born 1893)
- 6 July – Margret Boveri, journalist and writer (born 1900)
- 12 August – Werner Rittberger, figure skater (born 1891)
- 30 October – Gustav Ludwig Hertz, physicist, Nobel Prize laureate (born 1887)
- 26 November – Anton Storch, politician (born 1892)
- 16 December – Wilhelm Stählin, German Lutheran theologian, bishop, preacher (born 1883)
- 24 December – Otto Christian Archibald von Bismarck, German politician (born 1897)

== See also ==
- 1975 in German television
