= 1982 Nuremberg shooting =

1982 mass shooting in Nuremberg, West Germany

- Nuremberg (Germany) Nuremberg (Bavaria)
- Location: Twenty Five discotheque and Luitpoldstrasse, Nuremberg, Bavaria, West Germany
- Date: 24 June 1982; 44 years ago c. 9:45 p.m. (UTC+02:00)
- Attack type: Mass shooting, far-right terrorism, murder–suicide
- Weapons: .357 Magnum Smith & Wesson revolver; 7.65mm Walther PPK semi-automatic pistol; 9mm Luger P08 semi-automatic pistol
- Deaths: 4 (including the perpetrator)
- Injuries: 3
- Perpetrator: Helmut Oxner

On 24 June 1982, a mass shooting occurred in Nuremberg, Bavaria, West Germany. 26-year-old Helmut Oxner opened fire inside a discotheque and in the street, killing three people and wounding three others before killing himself. A known neo-Nazi with links to far-right organizations and previous violations of firearms laws, Oxner targeted foreigners during his shooting spree.

== Shooting ==
At 9:45 p.m. on 24 June 1982, Oxner drove from his parents' house in the suburban neighborhood of Röthenbach into the city center, parking in Kartäusergasse. He carried a shoulder bag concealing three handguns and 200 rounds of ammunition. At Königstrasse 74, Oxner descended the steps to the Twenty Five discotheque, a venue frequented by black customers. When asked to pay by the bouncer, Oxner drew a .357 Magnum revolver from his bag and shot and killed William Schenk, a 24-year-old African-American civilian resident of Nuremberg. Oxner ran inside the discotheque, shooting randomly at perceived foreigners on the dance floor. He killed a 27-year-old African-American army sergeant, Rufus Surles, and wounded a Korean woman. Ali K., a waiter described variously as Turkish or Libyan, charged Oxner and disarmed him, but was injured when Oxner took out a Walther PPK pistol and continued shooting. Arming himself with the Walther PPK and a Luger P08 pistol, Oxner exited the bar. He spared a local resident after demanding to know whether he was Turkish; when the man answered to the contrary, Oxner ran off towards Luitpoldstrasse. While running, he shouted at local police officers taking cover, stating, "Ich schieße nur auf Türken!" (I only shoot at Turks!) At some point, he also shouted, "Es lebe der Nationalsozialismus!" (Long live National Socialism!)

In Luitpoldstrasse, Oxner spotted a group of foreigners and shot at them, killing 21-year-old Egyptian Mohamed Ehap (or Ehab) and wounding Sultan A., a native of Libya, in the jaw. Oxner then took cover in Klaragasse, exchanging gunfire with police who arrived at the scene. After being shot in the hip by an officer, Oxner turned his gun on himself and shot himself twice in the heart and lungs, dying instantly.

== Perpetrator ==
The gunman was identified as Helmut Oxner, a 26-year-old German man who worked as a roofer for his father. Oxner was a known extremist with ties to several far-right organizations. From 1979 to 1981, Oxner attended local meetings of the National Democratic Party of Germany, as well as its youth wing, the Junge Nationalisten. He was expelled from the organization in January 1981 after making anti-Semitic statements. On 23 June 1982, one day prior to the shooting, Oxner and a 29-year-old accomplice appeared in court, charged with incitement and making threats for insulting Turkish and Jewish people in telephone calls. Having alluded to the murder in their calls, the two were investigated for involvement in the murder of Shlomo Levin, a Jewish community leader shot to death in 1980. However, they were determined to have had no connection to the shooting. After the two men confessed to the separate crime of vandalising Nuremberg's city walls with neo-Nazi slogans, Oxner's accomplice was sentenced to 15 months in prison, while Oxner himself retracted his confession and had a retrial scheduled in the fall of 1982. (Note: Der Spiegel states that both men retracted their confessions.)

In 1977, Oxner joined a sport shooting club and was allowed to possess weapons after the gun range instructor and neighbors testified to his character and expertise with firearms. According to Der Spiegel, complaints were routinely filed to the city government warning of Oxner's illegal possession of firearms and his potential for violence, but no action was taken. City official Helmut Rietzer later stated that the government believed Oxner was an ardent supporter of violent ideas, but not at risk of taking violent action. In early 1981, during a search of Oxner's house, police determined he illegally possessed at least two pistols and confiscated them. He was charged with violating firearms laws. Several months later, police dropped the charges, merely requesting Oxner pay 200 Deutsche Marks to charity.

Along with his weapons, Oxner's shoulder bag contained stickers reading "We Are Back" and containing the letters NSDAP, an abbreviation for the Nazi Party's official name. A prosecutor's spokesman stated that the stickers contained the initials "ao", possibly linking them to the NSDAP/AO, an American neo-Nazi organization founded by Gary Lauck.

== Aftermath ==
The government and media's labelling of the attack sparked controversy, as the shooting was officially described as a "rampage" with no political connotations. The state of Bavaria's special criminal investigation commissioner, Erwin Hösl, described Oxner as mentally ill, while Bavaria's Interior Ministry stated he was a "terrorist loner." Der Spiegel unfavorably compared this and the police's treatment of Oxner's firearms violations to actions against left-wing criminals. In 2012, the Interior Ministry classified the attack as being motivated by xenophobia and right-wing views; therefore, the attack was targeted towards foreigners, and not a random rampage.

As of 2023, no memorial existed to the victims of the shooting.
