= Heinrich Adolf von Bardeleben =

German surgeon (1819–1895)

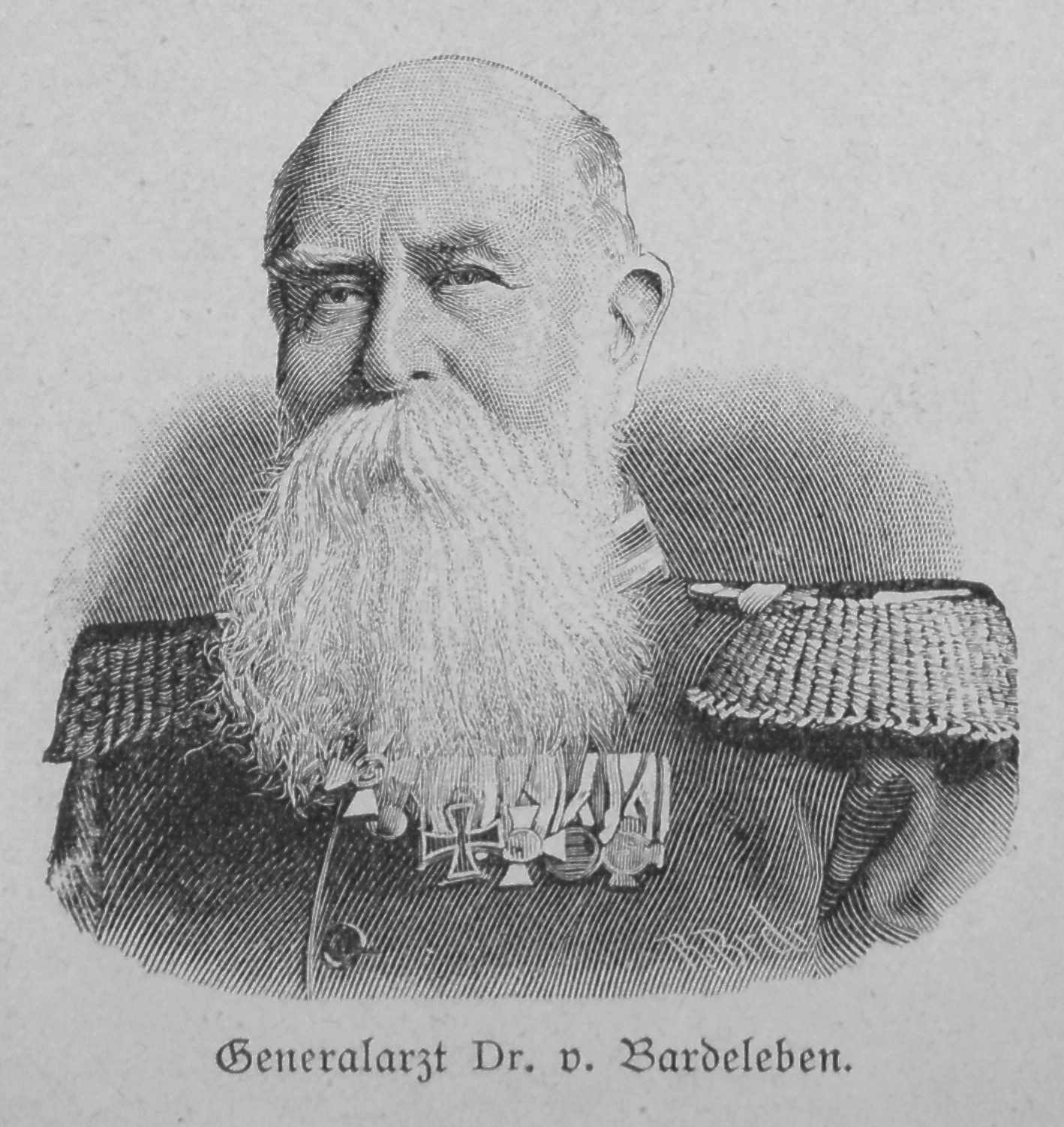
Generalarzt Dr. Heinrich Adolf von Bardeleben

Heinrich Adolf von Bardeleben (1 March 1819 – 24 September 1895) was a German surgeon.

== Career ==
Born in Frankfurt on the Oder, he studied medicine at the Universities of Heidelberg, Giessen, Paris and Berlin, receiving his doctorate in 1841 with a thesis on the construction of ductless glands. In 1848 he became an associate professor at Giessen followed by an appointment as a full professor of surgery at the University of Greifswald (1849). In 1868 he returned to Berlin, where he worked at the Charité until his death on 24 September 1895. he was rector of the University of Berlin in 1876–1877.

Known for his innovations associated with new surgical procedures, he is credited as being one of the first to introduce Joseph Lister's methodology for antiseptic treatment of wounds to the European continent. During the Austro-Prussian War (1866) and the Franco-Prussian War (1870–71) he served as Generalarzt to the army. His daughter, Mite Kremnitz (born Marie von Bardeleben), was a noted German author.

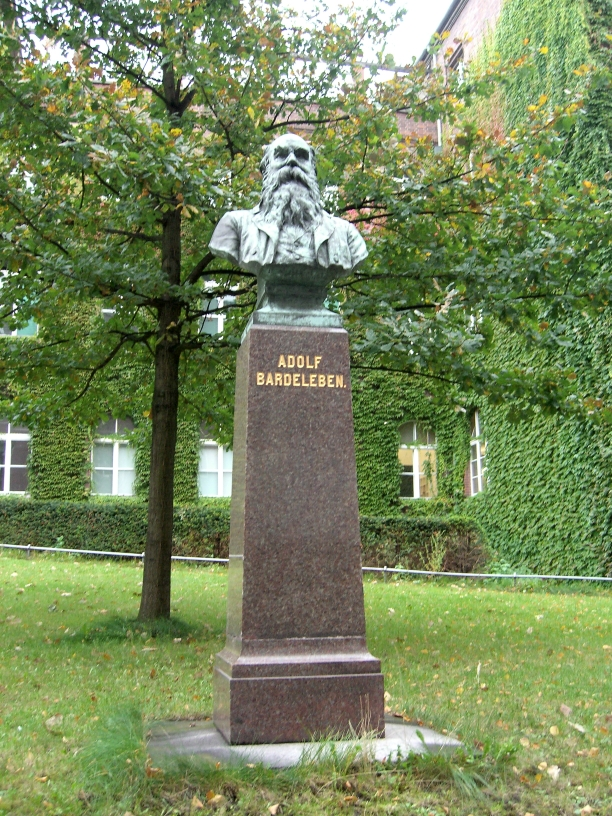
Monument to Bardeleben in Berlin

== Written works ==
- Observationes microscopicae de glandularum ductu excretorio carentium structura, deque earundem functionibus experimenta, 1841
- Lehrbuch der Chirurgie und Operationslehre. Besonders für das Bedürfnis der Studierenden ("Surgery manual. Particularly for the needs of students"), 1852–1882
- Über die konservative Richtung der neueren Chirurgie ("About the conservative direction of the new surgery"), 1855
- Rückblick auf die Fortschritte der Chirurgie in der zweiten Hälfte dieses Jahrhunderts ("Review of the progress of surgery in the second half of this century"), 1876
- Über die Bedeutung wissenschaftlicher Studien für die Ausbildung der Ärzte ("About the meaning of scientific studies for the formation of physicians"), 1876
- Rede zur Gedächtnisfeier der Friedrich-Wilhelms-Universität zu Berlin ("Speech regarding the commemoration of the Friedrich-Wilhelm University of Berlin"), 1877
- Über die Theorie der Wunden und die neueren Methoden der Wundbehandlung ("About the theory of wounds and the newer methods of wound treatment"), 1878
- Über die kriegschirurgische Bedeutung der neuen Geschosse ("About the significance of military surgery in regards to the new bullets"), 1892
