= 1980 in Germany =

- Decades: 1960s; 1970s; 1980s; 1990s; 2000s
- See also: Other events of 1980; History of Germany • Timeline • Years

Events in the year 1980 in Germany.

== Incumbents ==
- President – Karl Carstens (West Germany)
- Chancellor – Helmut Schmidt (West Germany)
- General Secretary – Erich Honecker (East Germany)
- Prime Minister – Willi Stoph (East Germany)

== Events ==
- 18 to 29 February - 30th Berlin International Film Festival
- 20 March - Germany participated in the Eurovision Song Contest 1980, held in The Hague.
- 26 September - Oktoberfest bombing
- 5 October - West German federal election, 1980
- 6 November - The Third Schmidt cabinet led by Helmut Schmidt was sworn in.
- unknown date - First modern guided bus opens in Essen.

== Births ==
- February 2 - Angela Finger-Erben, German journalist
- February 22 - Jeanette Biedermann, German singer
- February 28 - Stefan Konarske, German actor
- March 9 - Volker Bruch, German television actor
- March 18 - Juliette Schoppmann, German singer
- March 25 - Hanno Koffler, German actor
- May 2 - Tim Borowski, German footballer
- May 6 - Wolke Hegenbarth, German actress
- May 9 - Carolin Kebekus, German comedian
- May 16 - Jens Spahn, German politician
- June 13 - Sarah Connor, German singer
- June 16 - Sibel Kekilli, German actress
- July 4 - Fahri Yardım, German actor
- July 9 - Sebastian Sylvester, German boxer
- August 6 - Roman Weidenfeller, German football player
- August 28 - Petra Schmidt-Schaller, German actress
- December 4 - Stefan Pfannmöller, German canoeist
- December 29 - Yvonne Bönisch, German judoka

== Deaths ==
- 27 January - Rudolf Christoph Freiherr von Gersdorff, officer in the German Army. He attempted to assassinate Adolf Hitler by suicide bombing on 21 March 1943; (born 1905)
- February 6
  - Bernhard Eichhorn, German film composer (born 1904)
  - Franz Schafheitlin, German actor (born 1895)
- February 21 — Alfred Andersch, German writer (born 1914)
- March 5 — Wilhelm Hoegner, German politician (born 1887)
- April 22 — August von Finck Sr., German banker (born 1898)
- May 26 — Franz Bachelin, German art director (born 1895)
- June 8 — Ernst Busch, German actor and singer (born 1900)
- June 27 — Walter Dornberger, German Army artillery officer whose career spanned World War I and World War II. He was a leader of Nazi Germany's V-2 rocket program (born 1895)
- September 3 - Fabian von Schlabrendorff, German jurist, soldier, and member of the resistance against Adolf Hitler (born 1907)
- October 18 - Hans Ehard, German politician (born 1887)
- December 11 — Princess Victoria Louise of Prussia, German noblewoman (born 1892)
- December 24 — Karl Dönitz, German admiral who played a major role in the naval history of World War II (born 1891)

== See also ==
- 1980 in German television
