= 1978 in Germany =

- Decades: 1950s; 1960s; 1970s; 1980s; 1990s
- See also: Other events of 1978; History of Germany • Timeline • Years

Events in the year 1978 in Germany.

== Incumbents ==
- President – Walter Scheel
- Chancellor – Helmut Schmidt

== Events ==
- 20 February - Germany in the Eurovision Song Contest 1978
- 22 February - March 5 - 28th Berlin International Film Festival
- 16/17 July - 4th G7 summit in Bonn
- 25 July - Celle Hole
- undated: Die Tageszeitung is first published.

== Catastrophes ==
- 13 December - the motor ship MS München sank.

== Births ==
- January 17 - Susanne Schaper, German politician
- January 18 - Katja Kipping, German politician
- January 18 - Stev Theloke, German swimmer
- January 21 - Sven Schmid, German fencer
- February 1 - Tobias Hans, German politician
- February 2 - Nadine Ruf, German politician
- February 18 - Oliver Pocher, German television presenter
- February 20 - Julia Jentsch, German actress
- February 26 - Tom Beck, German actor
- March 6 - Thomas Godoj, Polish-born German singer and winner of Deutschland sucht den Superstar (season 5)
- March 16 - Annett Renneberg, German actress
- April 5 - Franziska van Almsick, German swimmer
- April 27 - Pinar Atalay, German radio and television presenter
- May 3 - Franziska Giffey, German politician
- May 20 - Nils Schumann, German athlete
- May 21
  - Briana Banks, German-American porn star
  - Katharina Wagner, German opera director
- June 9 - Miroslav Klose, German football player
- June 16 - Daniel Brühl, German actor
- June 19 - Dirk Nowitzki, German basketball player
- July 9 - Mark Medlock, German singer and winner of Deutschland sucht den Superstar (season 4)
- July 20 - Ludwig Hartmann, German politician
- August 10 - Oliver Petszokat, German singer and actor
- August 15 - Adel Tawil, German singer-songwriter
- August 18 - Daniel Hartwich, German television presenter

== Deaths ==
- January 3 - Alfred Braun, German actor and film director (born 1888)
- January 14 - Robert Heger, German conductor (born 1886)
- February 13 - Willi Domgraf-Fassbaender, German opera singer (born 1897)
- March 5 - Adolf Metzner, German athlete (born 1910)
- March 14 - Carl Vincent Krogmann, German politician (born 1889)
- May 30 - Gotthard Handrick, German athlete and fighter pilot (born 1908)
- June 4 - Ernst Langlotz, German archaeologist (born 1895)
- July 1 - Kurt Student, German paratroop general in the Luftwaffe during World War II. (born 1890)
- July 20 - Gertrud Morgner, German politician (born 1887)
- September 6 - Adolf Dassler, founder of the Adidas shoe company (born 1900)
- September 15 - Willy Messerschmitt, German aircraft designer and manufacturer (born 1898)
- September 24 - Hasso von Manteuffel, German general during World War II (born 1897)
- September 24 - Ida Noddack, German chemist (born 1896)
- December 17 - Josef Frings, German cardinal of Roman Catholic Church (born 1887)
