= Kümo Henriette =

- Country of origin: Germany

Kümo Henriette is a German television series.

== See also ==
- List of German television series
