= 1982 in German television =

This is a list of German television related events from 1982.

== Events ==
- 20 March - Nicole is selected to represent Germany at the 1982 Eurovision Song Contest with her song "Ein bißchen Frieden". She is selected to be the twenty-seventh German Eurovision entry during Ein Lied für Harrogate held at the BR Studios in Munich.
- 24 April - Germany wins the 27th Eurovision Song Contest in Harrogate, United Kingdom. The winning song is "Ein bißchen Frieden" performed by Nicole.

== Debuts ==
=== Domestic ===
- January - Einfach Lamprecht (1982) (ARD)
- 24 January - The Confessions of Felix Krull (1982) (ZDF)
- 19 April - Ein Stück Himmel (1982) (ARD)
- 12 May - Schwarz Rot Gold (1982–1996) (ARD)
- 12 July - Blood and Honor: Youth Under Hitler (1982) (ARD)
- 24 September - Meister Eder und sein Pumuckl (1982–1989) (ARD)
- 28 September - Die Pawlaks (1982) (ZDF)
- 25 December - Jack Holborn (1982) (ZDF)

== Television shows ==
=== 1950s ===
- Tagesschau (1952–present)

=== 1960s ===
- heute (1963-present)

=== 1970s ===
- heute-journal (1978-present)
- Tagesthemen (1978-present)

=== 1980s ===
- Wetten, dass..? (1981-2014)

== Ending this year ==
- 22 November - Disco (1971-1982)
