= Wiebke Zweig =

German politician (born 1982)

Member of the Landtag of Schleswig-Holstein
- Incumbent
- Assumed office 7 June 2022
- Preceded by: Hartmut Hamerich
- Constituency: Ostholstein-Süd

Personal details
- Born: 7 February 1982 (age 44)
- Party: Christian Democratic Union

Wiebke Zweig (born 7 February 1982) is a German politician serving as a member of the Landtag of Schleswig-Holstein since 2022. She has served as mayor of Bad Schwartau since 2018.
