= Andreas Kleinheinz =

German ice hockey player

- Born: 28 April 1983 (age 41); Germany
- Height: 5 ft 8 in (173 cm)
- Weight: 182 lb (83 kg; 13 st 0 lb)
- Position: Forward
- Shoots: Left
- Oberliga team Former teams: ATSE Graz; Graz 99ers
- Playing career: 2000–present

Andreas Kleinheinz (born 28 April 1983) is a German ice hockey player currently playing for ATSE Graz of the Austrian Oberliga.

Kleinheinz began his hockey career with ESV Kaufbeuren in the German Oberliga. After two seasons they were promoted to the 2nd Bundesliga. In 2003 he moved back to the Oberliga, joining EV Füssen for one season. He then went back to the 2nd Bundesliga with EV Füssen and then returned to Kaufbeuren. In 2007, he moved to Austria to join Graz 99ers.
