= Johannes Kölling =

German politician (born 1984)

Member of the Landtag of Rhineland-Palatinate
- Incumbent
- Assumed office 18 May 2026
- Preceded by: Lothar Rommelfanger
- Constituency: Konz/Saarburg

Personal details
- Born: 10 May 1984 (age 42)
- Party: Christian Democratic Union

Johannes Kölling (born 10 May 1984) is a German politician serving as a member of the Landtag of Rhineland-Palatinate since 2026. He is the group leader of the Christian Democratic Union in the city council of Saarburg.
