= East German Republic Day Parade of 1984 =

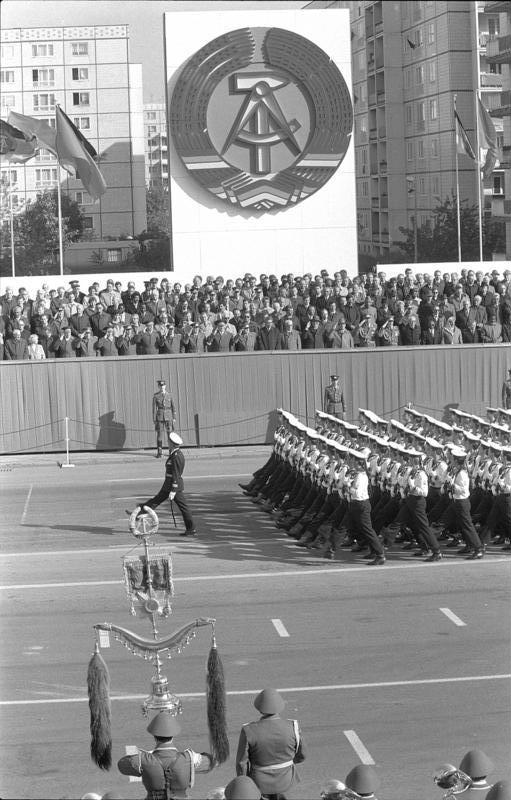
The military parade.

The East German Republic Day Parade of 1984 was a parade on Karl-Marx-Allee in East Berlin on October 7, 1984 commemorating the 35th anniversary of the establishment of East Germany. Soviet Foreign Minister Andrei Gromyko attended the celebrations.

== Preparatory activities ==
Timeline for preparatory activities in East Berlin:

- 1 November 1983 – The beginning of the brainstorming process of parade plans.
- 25 August 1984 – The beginning of the official parade preparations.
- 1-15 September 1984 – The beginning of parade training at military barracks. The preparation of military technology for the parade.
- 20-25 September 1984 – Parade training on a motorway section near Berlin (Groß Köris).
- 26 September 1984 – Parade rehearsal of the ground column to at Schönefeld Airfield (now Berlin Brandenburg Airport).
- 29 September 1984 – Transfer of the mot. Troops to Berlin and preparation of military technology
- 2 October 1984 – Nighttime preliminary rehearsal.
- 4 October 1984 – Final general rehearsal.

== See also ==
- East Germany
- National People's Army
- Public holidays in Germany
