= Reichsbund der Deutschen Beamten =

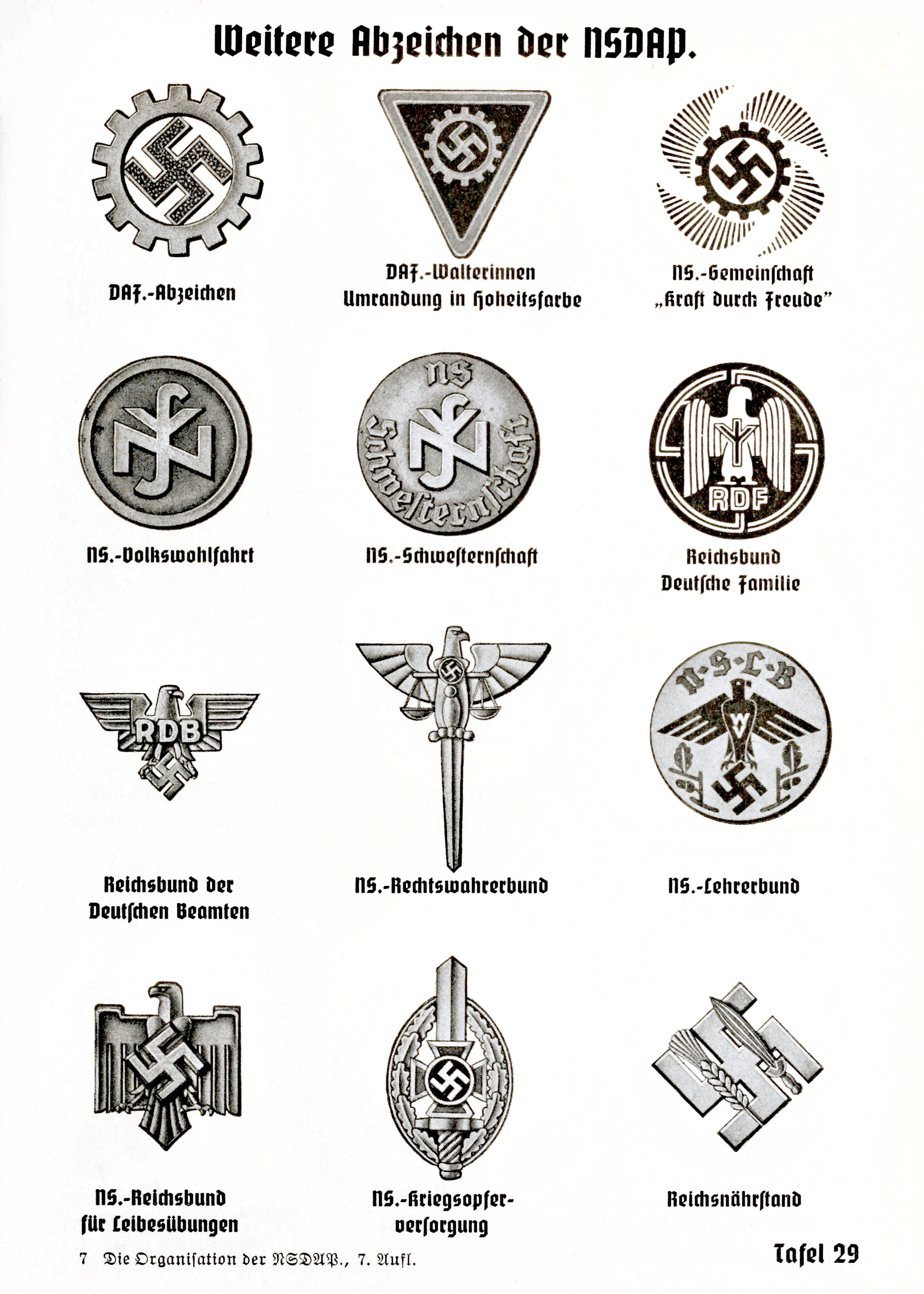
Emblem of the Reichsbund der Deutschen Beamten (RDB), from Organisationsbuch der NSDAP 1943

The Reichsbund der Deutschen Beamten (RDB), meaning "Reich Federation of German Civil Servants", also known as NS-Beamtenbund (National Socialist Civil Servants Federation), was the trade union for German State Officials during the Third Reich. The RDB was established as an organization affiliated to the Nazi party in October 1933. Its leader was Herman Neef. Neef had been previously leading the RDB's predecessor organisation, Deutscher Beamtenbund German Civil Service Federation, which had been founded in December 1918.

Although it was not compulsory for RDB members to be Nazi party members, most of them chose to be. In addition to the training and development of its members, the RDB ensured that German Civil Servants toed the line of the Nazi Party.

Following Nazi Germany's defeat in World War II, the American Military Government issued a special law outlawing the Nazi party and all of its branches. Known as "Law number five", this denazification decree disbanded the National Socialist Civil Servants Federation, like all other organizations linked to the Nazi Party. In the postwar years, it was reestablished as the German Civil Service Federation in the Federal Republic of Germany.

== See also ==
- German Civil Service Federation
