= William Julius Mann =

William Julius Mann (1819–1892) was a German-born American Lutheran theologian and author.

== Biography ==
He was born in Stuttgart. He studied there and in Tübingen and was ordained in 1841. Three years later he was invited by his friend Philip Schaff to come to the United States and settled in Philadelphia. There he was assistant pastor (1850–1863) and pastor (1863–1884) of St. Michael's and Zion's Church. From its establishment in 1864 almost to his death he was professor of symbolics (the study of the Lutheran confessions) at the Lutheran Theological Seminary. With Schaff he edited Der deutsche Kirchenfreund. His daughter, Emma T. Mann, wrote his Life (Philadelphia, 1893).

== Publications ==
- Plea for the Augsburg Confession, in Answer to the Objections of the Definite Platform (1856)
- Lutheranism in America (1857)
- Heilsbotschaft. Predigten (1881)
- Leben und Wirken William Penn's. Gabe zur zweihundertjährigen Gedächtnißfeier seiner ersten Ankunft in Pennsylvanien (1882)
- Ein Aufgang im Abendland. Mittheilungen aus der Geschichte der früheren evangelischen Missionsversuche unter den Indianern Amerikas (1883)
- Das Buch der Bücher und seine Geschichte. Dem christlichen Volk erzählt (1884)
- Heinrich Melchior Mühlenbergs Leben und Wirken (1887)
  - Life and Times of Henry Melchior Muhlenberg (1887)

== Sources ==
- Lueker, Erwin L.; Poellot, Luther; Jackson, Paul, eds. (2000). "Mann, Wilhelm Julius". Christian Cyclopedia (Online ed.). St. Louis: Concordia Publishing House.
- Mann, Emma T.: Memoir of the Life and Work of William Julius Mann. Together With A Few Sermons And Short Extracts (1893)
- Spaeth, Adolf: D. Wilhelm Julius Mann, ein deutsch-amerikanischer Theologe. Erinnerungsblätter (1895)
