= Nina Klinkel =

German politician (born 1983)

Member of the Landtag of Rhineland-Palatinate
- Incumbent
- Assumed office 18 May 2016
- Constituency: Ingelheim am Rhein (2021–2026)

Personal details
- Born: 10 September 1983 (age 43)
- Party: Social Democratic Party (since 2005)

Nina Klinkel (born 10 September 1983) is a German politician serving as a member of the Landtag of Rhineland-Palatinate since 2016. She has served as deputy group leader of the Social Democratic Party since 2024.
