= Friedrich Gustav Jaeger =

German resistance fighter (1895–1944)

Friedrich Jaeger
- Born: 25 September 1895; Kirchberg an der Jagst, Kingdom of Württemberg, German Empire
- Died: 21 August 1944 (aged 48); Plötzensee Prison, Berlin, German Reich
- Cause of death: Execution by hanging
- Relatives: ∞ 1918 Marie-Elisabeth Schlee
- Military career
- Allegiance: German Empire; Weimar Republic; Nazi Germany
- Branch: Imperial German Army; Freikorps; Reichsheer; German Army
- Service years: 1914–1918; 1919–1920; 1934–1935; 1935–1944
- Rank: Oberst
- Commands: II./Infanterie-Regiment 8 Infanterie-Regiment 8 Commander of Panzer Troops II; Commander of Panzer Troops XXI
- Conflicts: World War I World War II
- Awards: Knight's Cross of the Iron Cross
- Other work: Businessman

Friedrich "Fritz" Gustav Jaeger (25 September 1895 – 21 August 1944) was a resistance fighter in Nazi Germany and a member of the 20 July Plot.

== Early life ==
After serving in World War I, Jaeger studied agricultural economics in Tettnang. His only son Krafft Werner Jaeger, was born in 1919. That year, Jaeger became a member of the German Workers' Party, which later became the Nazi Party. Although Jaeger was a leading member of the Freikorps Oberland, he refused to participate in the Kapp Putsch in 1920 and later left the Nazi Party.

== Resistance activities ==
In 1938, after the Sudeten Crisis, Jaeger took part in the German invasion of Czechoslovakia's Sudeten-German areas. With the outbreak of the Second World War, he was deployed in the invasion of Poland. From 1939, Jaeger forged contacts with resistance elements within the Wehrmacht, including Hans Oster, Friedrich Olbricht and Ludwig Beck. In 1940, he participated in the Battle of France where he earned the Knight's Cross of the Iron Cross ) and in 1941, he was deployed in the Russian Campaign.

After his wife's death during a British bombing raid on 17 February 1942, Jaeger spoke with his son for the first time about his contacts with the resistance and their plans to overthrow Adolf Hitler. In the course of the year, Jaeger was made a colonel, and he was sent to the Battle of Stalingrad. There, he was wounded, and after becoming sick with epidemic typhus, he was flown out to Lublin.

In 1943, Jaeger was approached and reluctantly agreed to the plans for an attempt on Hitler's life. Owing to his Christian convictions, he would rather have seen Hitler standing before a duly constituted court. Jaeger's son was a captain in the Gross Deutschland Division, one of Germany's most elite units. Jaeger's son Krafft was arrested and charged with attempted treason and leading a comrade into military disobedience. Krafft was freed for lack of evidence, but he was then sent back to the front so that he could "recover his honour".

== Plot failure, arrest, and death ==
On 20 July 1944, the day of the attempt on Hitler's life, Jaeger was commander of the Panzer reserve troops in defence districts II (Stettin) and XXI (Kalisch). After the briefcase bomb exploded at the Wolf's Lair in East Prussia, Jaeger received orders from Claus Schenk von Stauffenberg to arrest an SS Oberführer. Furthermore, he was also to arrest Joseph Goebbels and occupy the radio station in Masurenallee. After it became known that Hitler had survived the attempt on his life, however, the soldiers under his command would no longer take his orders. Jaeger himself was arrested by his own army on the same day when the plot failed in connection with the plot. His son was likewise arrested, being taken from an Italian military hospital and brought by train to the Gestapo prison in Berlin. On 21 August, Friedrich Gustav Jaeger was sentenced to death for treason by Roland Freisler at the Volksgerichtshof, and he was hanged later the same day at Plötzensee Prison in Berlin. His family's property was confiscated.

== Honours ==
Krafft Jaeger was sent to Sachsenhausen concentration camp. He survived, however, and on 25 September 1995, he unveiled a memorial plaque to his father at the house where he was born exactly one hundred years earlier. The house is now Kirchberg an der Jagst's town hall.

Friedrich Gustav Jaeger has also been honoured by having a street in Wünsdorf named Fritz-Jaeger-Allee after him.
