= Karl Deichgräber =

German classical philologist (1903–1984)

Karl Marienus Deichgräber (10 February 1903, Aurich, Province of Hanover – 16 December 1984, Bovenden) was a German classical philologist. Deichgräber was a member of the Nazi Party.

== Biography ==
Karl Deichgräber studied at the Gymnasium Ulricianum in Aurich until 1922. From that date, he studied classical philology, as well as other subjects, at the University of Göttingen, and then at Humboldt University of Berlin and University of Münster, where the philologist Hermann Schöne encouraged Deichgräber to concentrate on the history of medicine. In 1928, Deichgräber earned his doctorate at Münster with a thesis on medical schools during the time of Ancient Greece. Upon returning to Berlin, he habilitated in 1931, with research of books I and III of the Epidemics by Hippocrates. In 1935 he was summoned to the University of Marburg as a professor specializing in Hellenistic Greece. Three years later he succeeded Max Pohlenz at the University of Göttingen. From 1939 to 1945 he also served there as Dean of the Faculty of Philosophy. He rejected requests from Graz, Würzburg and Frankfurt. In 1938, he joined the Nazi Party.

On 25 January 1946, Deichgräber was removed from office, which he felt throughout his life as deeply unfair. In 1951, he was partially reinstated as "professor of retraining" (Professor zur Wiederverwendung), but only in 1957 did he receive his old position as professor of classical philology, after succeeding emeritus professor Kurt Latte, who had been expelled by the Nazis, but had returned to Göttingen. From then on, Deichgräber taught at Göttingen until he retired in April 1968. He was succeeded by Klaus Nickau.

== Selected works ==
- Die griechische Empirikerschule: Sammlung der Fragmente und Darstellung der Lehre. Berlin, 1930 (Doctoral thesis, Münster, 1928; reprinted, Berlin, 1965).
- Die Epidemien und das Corpus Hippocraticum: Voruntersuchungen zu einer Geschichte der koischen Ärzteschule. Berlin, 1933 (reprinted, Berlin, 1971).
- Hippokrates über Entstehung und Aufbau des menschlichen Körpers (Peri sarkon). In Gemeinschaft mit den Mitgliedern des philologischen Proseminars Berlin. Mit einem sprachwissenschaftlichen Beitrag von Eduard Schwyzer. Leipzig, 1935.
- Die Lykurgie des Aischylos: Versuch einer Wiederherstellung der Dionysischen Tetralogie. Göttingen, 1939 (reprint of Gesellschaft der Wissenschaften zu Göttingen, Philol.-histor. Kl. Fachgruppe 1, Altertumswissenschaft. Neue Folge, Vol. 3, Nº 6).
- Die Perser des Aischylos. Göttingen, 1941 (reprint of Akademie der Wissenschaften in Göttingen. Philol.-histor. Kl., Jahrg. 1941, Nº 8).
- Eleusinische Frömmigkeit und homerische Vorstellungswelt im homerischen Demeterhymnus. Mainz, 1950 (Abh. der Akad. d. Wiss. & Lit. Geistes- und Sozialwiss. Kl., Jahrg. 1950, Nº 6).
- Professio medici: zum Vorwort des Scribonius Largus. Mainz 1950 (Abh. der Akad. d. Wiss. & Lit. Geistes- und Sozialwiss. Kl., Jahrg. 1950, Nº 9).
- Der listensinnende Trug des Gottes: vier Themen des griechischen Denkens. Göttingen, 1952.
- Natura varie ludens: ein Nachtrag zum griechischen Naturbegriff. Mainz, 1954 (Abh. der Akad. d. Wiss. & Lit. Geistes- und Sozialwiss. Kl., Jahrg. 1954, Nº 3).
- Der hippokratische Eid. Stuttgart, 1955 (4ª expanded edition, 1983).
- Parabasenverse aus Thesmophoriazusen II des Aristophanes bei Galen. Berlin, 1956 (Sitzungsber. d. Dt. Akad. d. Wiss. zu Berlin. Kl. für Sprachen, Literatur u. Kunst, Jahrg. 1956, Nº 2).
- Galen als Erforscher des menschlichen Pulses: ein Beitrag zur Selbstdarstellung des Wissenschaftlers (De dignotione pulsuum I 1). Berlin, 1957 (Sitzungsber. d. Dt. Akad. d. Wiss. zu Berlin. Kl. für Sprachen, Literatur u. Kunst, Jahrg. 1956, Nº 3).
- Parmenides' Auffahrt zur Göttin des Rechts: Untersuchungen zum Prooimion seines Lehrgedichts. Mainz, 1958 (Abh. der Akad. d. Wiss. & Lit. Geistes- und Sozialwiss. Kl., Jahrg. 1958, Nº 11).
- With Fridolf Kudlien and Franz Pfaff: Galens Kommentare zu den Epidemien des Hippokrates. Berlin, 1960.
- Rhythmische Elemente im Logos des Heraklit. Mainz, 1963 (Abh. der Akad. d. Wiss. & Lit. Geistes- und Sozialwiss. Kl., Jahrg. 1962, Nº 9).
- Die Musen, Nereiden und Okeaninen in Hesiods Theogonie. Mit einem Nachtrag zu Natura varie ludens. Mainz, 1965 (Abh. der Akad. d. Wiss. & Lit. Geistes- und Sozialwiss. Kl., Jahrg. 1965, Nº 4).
- Medicus gratiosus: Untersuchungen zu einem griechischen Arztbild, mit dem Anhang Testamentum Hippocratis und Rhazes' De indulgentia medici. Mainz, 1970 (Abh. der Akad. d. Wiss. & Lit. Geistes- und Sozialwiss. Kl., Jahrg. 1970, Nº 3).
- Charis und Chariten, Grazie und Grazien. Munich, 1971.
- Aretaeus von Kappadozien als medizinischer Schriftsteller. Berlin, 1971.
- Der letzte Gesang der Ilias. Mainz, 1972 (Abh. der Akad. d. Wiss. & Lit. Geistes- und Sozialwiss. Kl., Jahrg. 1972, Nº 5).
- Hippokrates' De humoribus in der Geschichte der griechischen Medizin. Mainz, 1972 (Abh. der Akad. d. Wiss. & Lit. Geistes- und Sozialwiss. Kl., Jahrg. 1972, Nº 14).
- Pseudhippokrates' Über die Nahrung: Text, Kommentar und Würdigung einer stoisch-heraklitisierenden Schrift aus der Zeit um Christi Geburt. Mainz, 1973 (Abh. der Akad. d. Wiss. & Lit. Geistes- und Sozialwiss. Kl., Jahrg. 1973, Nº 3).
- Die Persertetralogie des Aischylos: mit einem Anhang, Aischylos' Glaukos Pontios u. Leon, Mainz, 1974 (Abh. der Akad. d. Wiss. & Lit. Geistes- und Sozialwiss. Kl., Jahrg. 1974, Nº 4).
- Die Patienten des Hippokrates: historisch-prosopographische Beiträge zu den Epidemien des Corpus Hippocraticum. Mainz, 1982 (Abh. der Akad. d. Wiss. & Lit. Geistes- und Sozialwiss. Kl., Jahrg. 1982, Nº 9).
- Das Ganze-Eine des Parmenides: fünf Interpretationen zu seinem Lehrgedicht. Mainz, 1983 (Abh. der Akad. d. Wiss. & Lit. Geistes- und Sozialwiss. Kl., Jahrg. 1983, Nº 7).
