= Jesko von Puttkamer =

German military chief and governor of Kamerun

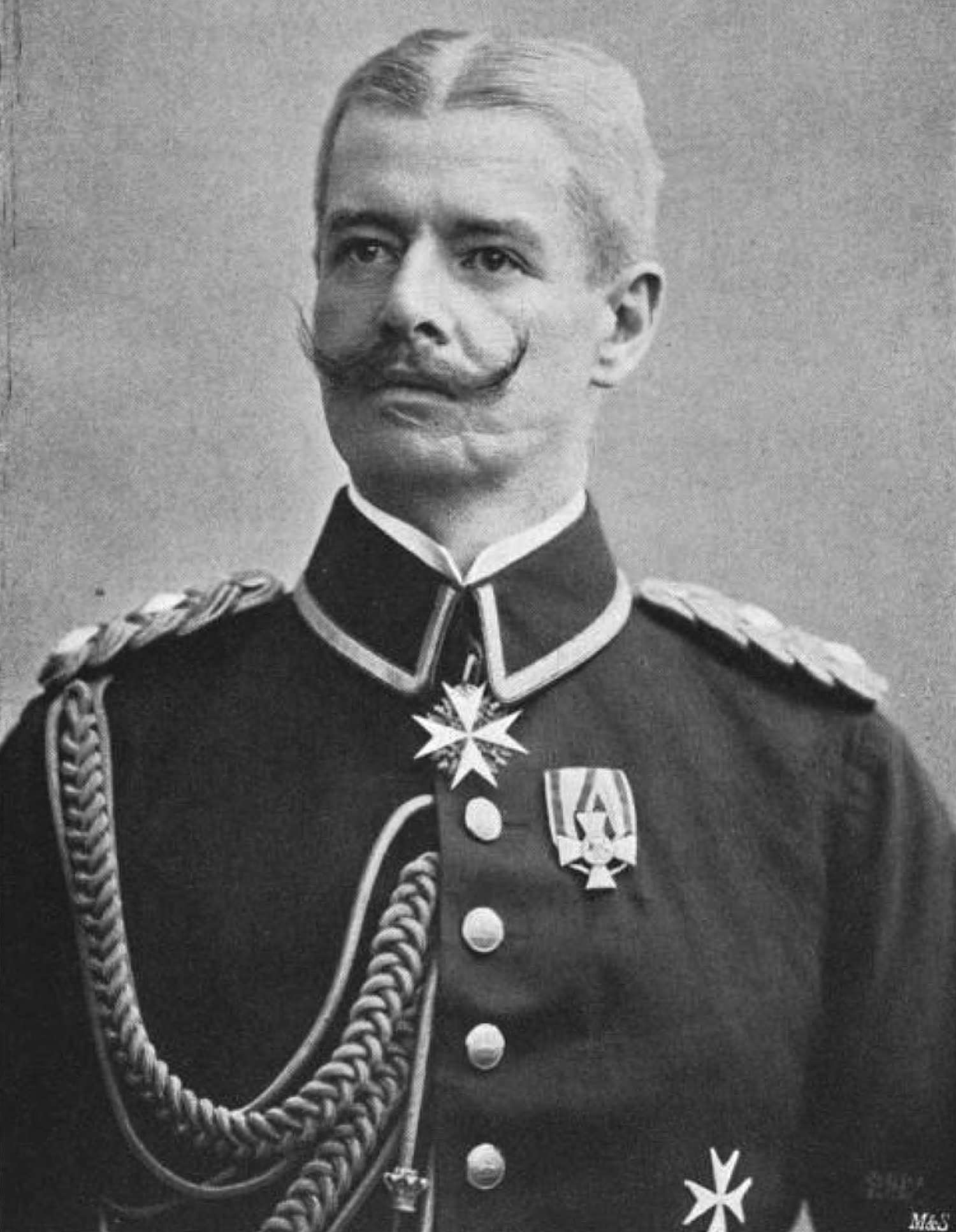

4th Gouverneur of Kamerun
- In office 13 August 1895 – 9 May 1907
- Preceded by: Eugen von Zimmerer
- Succeeded by: Theodor Seitz

3rd Landeshauptleute of Togoland
- In office 4 June 1892 – 13 August 1895
- Preceded by: Eugen von Zimmerer
- Succeeded by: August Kohler

Personal details
- Born: 2 July 1855 Berlin, Kingdom of Prussia
- Died: 23 January 1917 (aged 61) Berlin, Prussia
- Cause of death: Suicide by hanging

Military service
- Allegiance: German Empire
- Branch/service: Imperial German Army: Schutztruppe
- Years of service: 1885–1908
- Rank: Major
- Battles/wars: Adamawa Wars; Bafut Wars

Jesko Albert Eugen von Puttkamer (2 July 1855 – 23 January 1917) was a German diplomat, colonial administrator, and military officer who served as colonial governor of German Kamerun from 1895 to 1907.

== Early life and career ==
Jesko von Puttkamer was born to an aristocratic family. His father, Robert von Puttkamer, served as Interior Minister of Prussia, while his aunt, Johanna von Puttkamer, was the wife of Otto von Bismarck. Puttkamer studied law at various schools throughout Germany, and as a young man became notorious for engaging in gambling and prostitution. In 1883, he began his diplomatic career working at the German Consulate in Chicago.

== Colonial service ==
In 1885, as a result of his frivolous lifestyle, Puttkamer was sent to the newly-established German colony of Kamerun in Africa, where he became a colonial diplomat, and was also drafted into the Imperial German Army as an officer in the Schutztruppe. He was eventually appointed by governor Julius von Soden to serve as Deputy Governor, a position which he served until 1890, after which he worked as a German diplomat in Nigeria. From 1892 to 1895, Puttkamer served as Landeshauptmann of Togoland.

=== Governor of Kamerun ===
Jesko von Puttkamer was appointed Governor of Kamerun on 13 August 1895, succeeding Eugen von Zimmerer. During his term, he launched military campaigns against the kingdoms of the Adamawa and Bafut, after both had uprisen against German rule. It was during these campaigns that Puttkamer and his troops committed several atrocities, including forced castrations, fatal floggings, and the kidnapping of young girls to be employed as concubines. In addition, he employed forced labor and favored the rights of white men and his troops over those of native women, which put him at odds with missionaries in the region. In response to these misdeeds, King Manga Ndumbe Bell of the Duala led a delegation of tribal chieftains to Berlin in 1902 to appeal to the German government in protest of Puttkamer's actions. This delegation was unsuccessful, and three years later Bell made a second attempt, only to be arrested by Puttkamer upon his return and given a prison sentence of nine years.

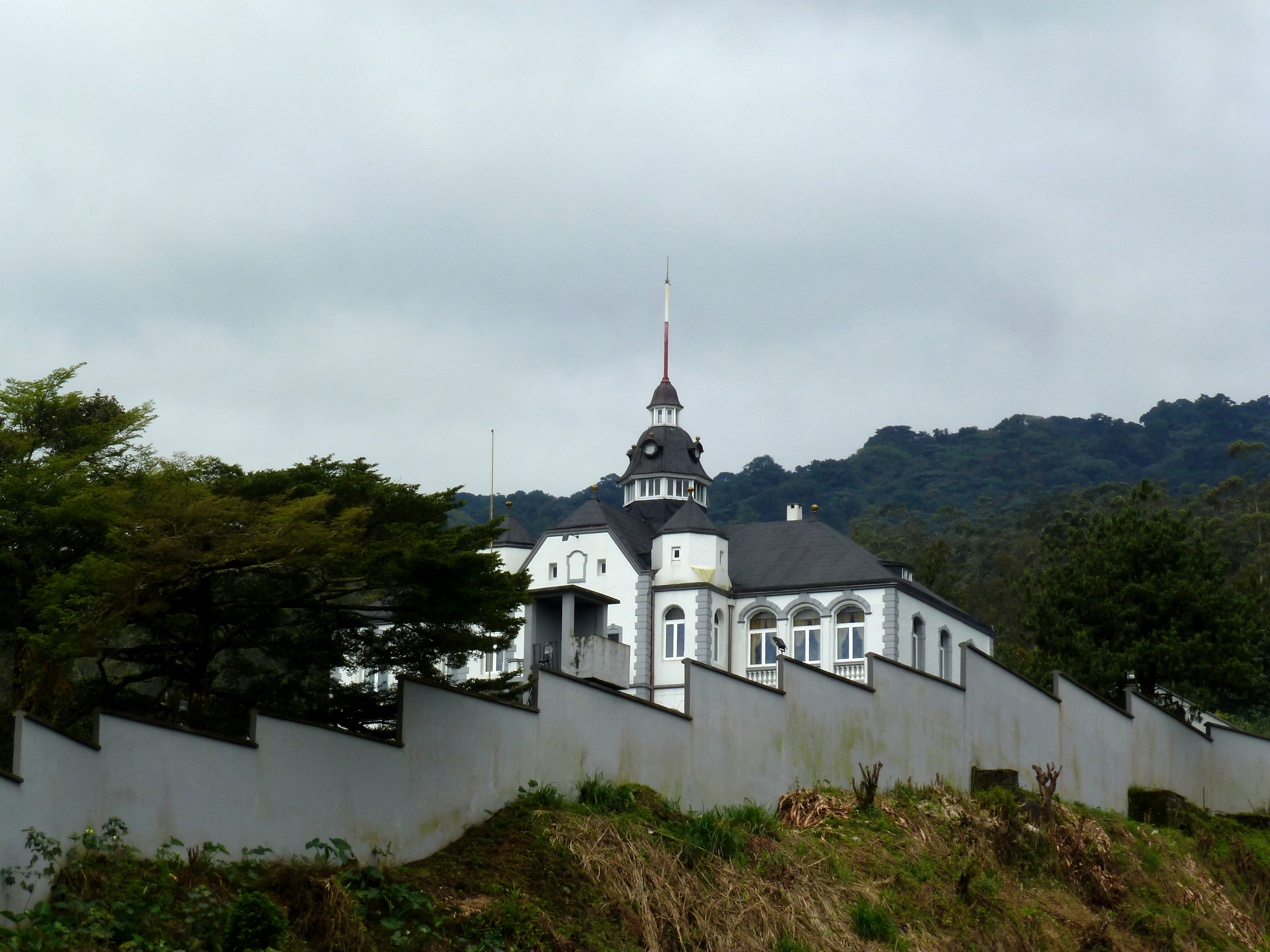
Puttkamer's residence in Buea

By 1906, news of Bell's arrest and the events in Kamerun had led to a public outcry in Germany, and Puttkamer was finally put on trial. During the trial, Puttkamer was found guilty of acts of insubordination, and was made to pay a fine of 1,000 Reichsmarks. On 9 May 1907, Puttkamer was dismissed as governor by German colonial secretary Bernhard Dernburg. Puttkamer had built a lavish residence for himself in Buea; following his dismissal, the residence was occupied by the new civilian governor of Kamerun Theodor Seitz.

== Marriage and death ==
Jesko von Puttkamer officially retired from military service in 1908. In 1914, after many decades of celibacy, he married Elisabeth Passow. They had one son, who died in infancy. Puttkamer hanged himself on 23 January 1917.

== Bibliography ==
- Ralph Erbar: Puttkamer, Jesko Freiherr von. In: New German Biography (NDB). Volume 21, Duncker & Humblot, Berlin 2003, ISBN 3-428-11202-4, p. 21 f. (digital copy).
- German Colonial Lexicon. Volume 3. Leipzig 1920, p. 117. (online)
- Florian Hoffmann: Occupation and military administration in Cameroon. Establishment and institutionalization of the colonial monopoly on the use of force 1891–1914. Goettingen 2007.
- Andreas Eckert : Cameroon as a German colony. In: Back then. Magazine for history and culture. February 1996.
- Ellinor von Puttkamer (editor): history of the sex v. putting chamber. (= German family archive, volume 83-85). 2nd Edition. Degener, Neustadt an der Aisch 1984, ISBN 3-7686-5064-2, pp. 695–696.
- Jürg Schneider: Berlin-Cameroon: The governor and a Berlin half-world lady, in: Ulrich van der Heyden and Joachim Zeller (eds.): Colonialism in this country - a search for traces in Germany. Sutton Verlag, Erfurt 2007, ISBN 978-3-86680-269-8, pp. 195–200.
- Richard Tsogang Fossi: Puttkamer, Jesko (von). In: Collectif (ed.), Atlas de l'absence. Le patrimoine culturel du cameroun en Allemagne, Berlin 2023, (english working translation online) Berlin 2023, p. 437-439.
