= 1913 in Germany =

- Decades: 1890s; 1900s; 1910s; 1920s; 1930s
- See also: Other events of 1913; History of Germany • Timeline • Years

Events in the year 1913 in Germany.

== Incumbents ==
=== National level ===
- Emperor – Wilhelm II
- Chancellor – Theobald von Bethmann Hollweg

=== State level ===
==== Kingdoms ====
- King of Bavaria – Otto to 5 November, then Ludwig III
- King of Prussia – Wilhelm II
- King of Saxony – Frederick Augustus III
- King of Württemberg – William II

==== Grand Duchies ====
- Grand Duke of Baden – Frederick II
- Grand Duke of Hesse – Ernest Louis
- Grand Duke of Mecklenburg-Schwerin – Frederick Francis IV
- Grand Duke of Mecklenburg-Strelitz – Adolphus Frederick V
- Grand Duke of Oldenburg – Frederick Augustus II
- Grand Duke of Saxe-Weimar-Eisenach – William Ernest

==== Principalities ====
- Schaumburg-Lippe – Adolf II, Prince of Schaumburg-Lippe
- Schwarzburg-Rudolstadt – Günther Victor, Prince of Schwarzburg
- Schwarzburg-Sondershausen – Günther Victor, Prince of Schwarzburg
- Principality of Lippe – Leopold IV, Prince of Lippe
- Reuss Elder Line – Heinrich XXIV, Prince Reuss of Greiz (with Heinrich XIV, Prince Reuss Younger Line to 29 March, then Heinrich XXVII, Prince Reuss Younger Line, as regent)
- Reuss Younger Line – Heinrich XIV, Prince Reuss Younger Line to 29 March, then Heinrich XXVII, Prince Reuss Younger Line
- Waldeck and Pyrmont – Friedrich, Prince of Waldeck and Pyrmont

==== Duchies ====
- Duke of Anhalt – Frederick II, Duke of Anhalt
- Duke of Brunswick – Duke John Albert of Mecklenburg (regent) to 1 November, then Ernest Augustus, Duke of Brunswick from 2 November
- Duke of Saxe-Altenburg – Ernst II, Duke of Saxe-Altenburg
- Duke of Saxe-Coburg and Gotha – Charles Edward, Duke of Saxe-Coburg and Gotha
- Duke of Saxe-Meiningen – Georg II, Duke of Saxe-Meiningen

==== Colonial Governors ====
- Cameroon (Kamerun) – Karl Ebermaier (1st term) to 9 October, then ... Full
- Kiaochow (Kiautschou) – Alfred Meyer-Waldeck
- German East Africa (Deutsch-Ostafrika) – Albert Heinrich Schnee
- German New Guinea (Deutsch-Neuguinea) – Albert Hahl (2nd term)
- German Samoa (Deutsch-Samoa) – Erich Schultz-Ewerth
- German South-West Africa (Deutsch-Südwestafrika) – Theodor Seitz
- Togoland – Duke Adolf Friedrich of Mecklenburg

== Events ==
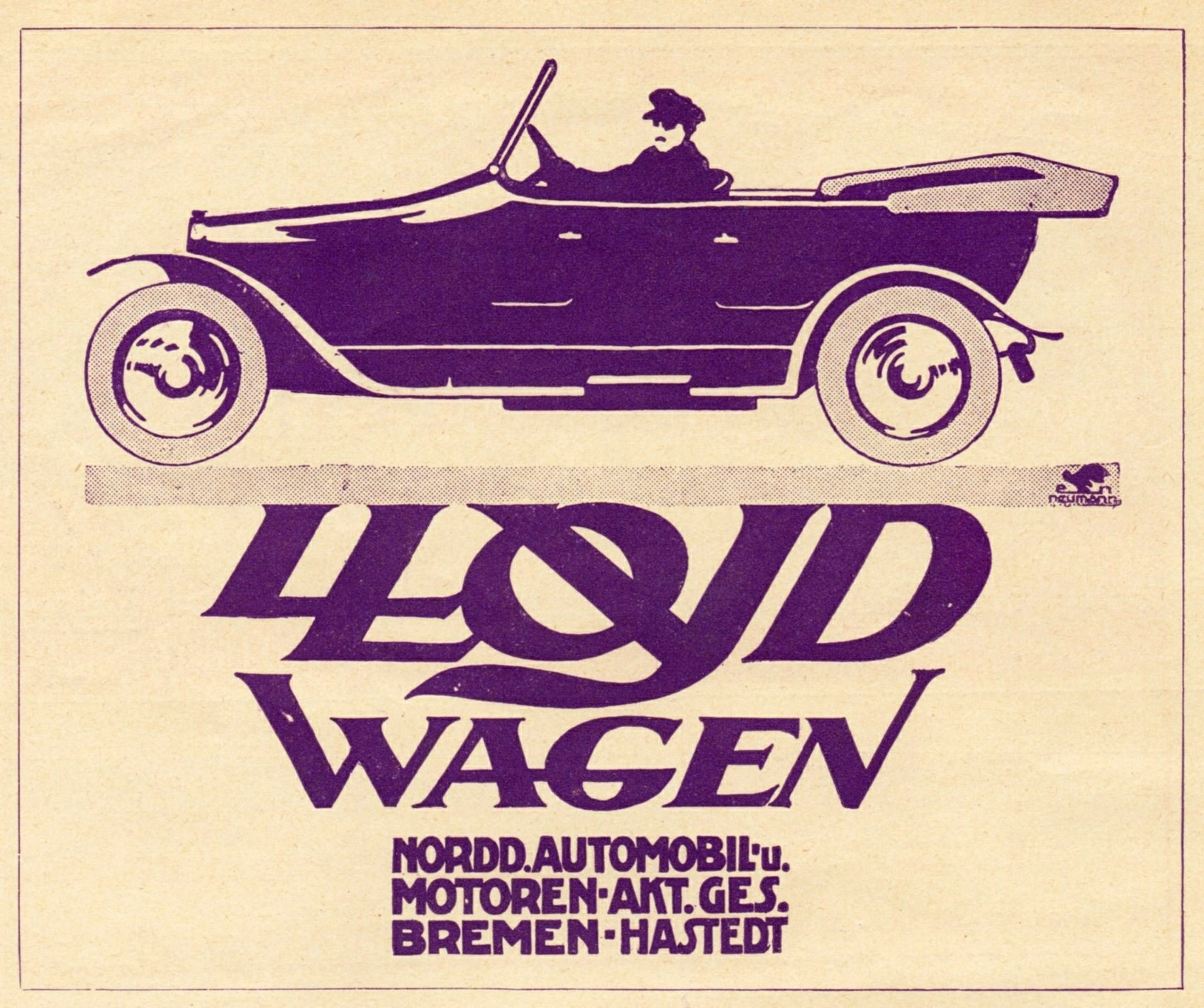
1913 Lloyd Wagen advertisement, Bremen

- April – Bernhard Kellermann's novel Der Tunnel is published.
- April 10 – Albrecht Grocery Shop, predecessor of the Aldi discount store chain globally, is founded in Essen.
- May 16 – Eberswalde Hoard discovered
- June 8 – The Deutsches Stadion in Berlin is dedicated with the release of 10,000 pigeons, in front of an audience of 60,000 people. It had been constructed in anticipation of the 1916 Summer Olympics (later to be cancelled as the result of World War I).
- June 20 – Bremen school shooting causes the death of five pupils and the wounding 21 other people.
- September 9 – In Oppau, BASF starts the world's first plant for the production of fertilizer based on the Haber-Bosch process, feeding today about a third of the world's population.
- October 17 – Johannisthal air disaster occurs with an Imperial German Navy's L 2 airship's test flight resulted in the death of all 28 passengers and crew on board
- October 19 – The DLRG (German Life-Saving Society) is founded.
- October 28–December 2 – Zabern Affair: Acts of aggression by the Prussian garrison at Zabern, Alsace-Lorraine provoke political debate across the German Empire.
- Date unknown - Bergius process is invented by German chemist Friedrich Bergius.
- Date unknown - Chemical element Protactinium is first identified by Oswald Helmuth Göhring and Kasimir Fajans.
- Date unknown - Die Naturwissenschaften first published by Die Kaiser-Wilhelm-Gesellschaft zur Förderung der Wissenschaften e. V.

== Births ==
- 23 January - Herbert Runge, German boxer (died 1986)
- 29 January - Peter von Zahn, German journalist, writer (died 2001)
- 25 February — Gert Fröbe, German actor (died 1988)
- 26 February – Hermann Lenz, German poet and author (died 1998)
- 2 March - Falk Harnack, German director and screenwriter (died 1991)
- 18 March - Reinhard Hardegen, German U-boat commander (died 2018)
- 21 March - Werner Höfer, German journalist (died 1997)
- 9 April - Heinrich Wöhlk German optometrist. (died 1991)
- 10 April - Stefan Heym, German writer (died 2001)
- 19 April - Karl Rawer, German physicist, specialist in radio wave propagation and the ionosphere (died 2018)
- 21 April - Kai-Uwe von Hassel, German politician (died 1997)
- 24 April - Paul Esser, German actor (died 1988)
- 27 April – Luz Long, German long jump athlete (died 1943)
- 11 May – Robert Jungk, German-born Austrian journalist (died 1994 in Austria)
- 13 May - Lotte Rausch, German actress (died 1995)
- 26 May - Josef Manger, German heavy weightlifter (died 1991)
- 31 May – Peter Frankenfeld, German comedian (died 1979)
- 2 June - Walter Andreas Schwarz, German singer, song-writer (died 1992)
- 10 June – Benjamin Shapira, German-born Israeli biochemist (died 1993)
- 26 June – Rudolf Brazda, German concentration camp prisoner (died 2011)
- 16 July – Antoine Raab, German footballer (died 2006)
- 1 August
  - Heinz Ellenberg, German biologist (died 1997)
  - Hajo Herrmann, German Luftwaffe pilot (died 2010)
- 4 August – Johann Niemann, SS officer (died 1943)
- 10 August – Wolfgang Paul, German physicist (died 1993)
- 26 August - Julius Döpfner, German cardinal of Roman Catholic Church (died 1976)
- 15 September
  - Johannes Steinhoff, German general (died 1994)
  - Hans Filbinger, German politician (died 2007)
- 17 September - Robert Lembke, German television presenter, game show host (died 1989)
- 26 September
  - Berthold Beitz, German industrialist (died 2013)
  - Ernst Schnabel, German writer (died 1986)
- 24 October - Jürgen Oesten, German seaman, U-boat commander during World War II. (died 2010)
- 8 November – Ludwig Elsbett, German engineer (died 2003)
- 13 November - Walter Horten, German aircraft pilot (died 1998)
- 21 November - Volker von Collande, German actor and film director (died 1990)
- 24 November - Gisela Mauermayer, German athlete (died 1995)
- 9 December
  - Friedrich Dickel, German politician (died 1993)
  - Fritz Grasshoff, German writer (died 1997)
- 18 December – Willy Brandt, German politician, former Chancellor of Germany (died 1992)
- 19 December - Ernst Stuhlinger, German rocket scientist (died 2008)
- 25 December – Henri Nannen, German journalist (died 1996)
- 28 December - Egbert Hayessen, German mayor (died 1944)
- 30 December - Tilo von Berlepsch, German actor (died 1991)

== Deaths ==
- 4 January - Alfred von Schlieffen, German fieldmarshall (born 1833)
- 6 January - Carl Arp, landscape painter (born 1867)
- 8 January - Friedrich Schrempf, German editor and politician (born 1858)
- 11 January - Karl Binz, German pharmacologist (born 1832)
- 21 January - Friedrich von Hollmann, German admiral (born 1842)
- 6 March – Paul Friedrich August Ascherson, botanist (born 1834)
- 29 March – Heinrich XIV, Prince Reuss Younger Line, nobleman (born 1832)
- 14 April - Carl Hagenbeck, German merchant (born 1844)
- 19 April – Hugo Winckler, archaeologist (born 1863)
- 29 April - Andreas Flocken, German engineer and inventor (born 1845)
- 29 May – Eduard Pechuël-Loesche, naturalist, geographer, ethnologist, painter, traveler, author and plant collector (born 1840)
- 9 August – Wilhelm Albermann, German sculptor (born 1835)
- 13 August
  - Bernhard Bardenheuer, surgeon (born 1839)
  - August Bebel, politician (born 1840)
- 21 August – Carl Ludwig von Bar, jurist (born 1836)
- 29 August – Herman Aron, electrical engineer (born 1845)
- 31 August – Erwin Bälz, physician and anthropologist (born 1849)
- 29 September – Rudolf Diesel, engineer and inventor (born 1858)
- 5 October - Hans von Bartels, painter (born 1856)
- 10 October - Adolphus Busch, German businessman (born 1839)
- 7 December - Heinrich Ernst Göring, German jurist and diplomat (born 1839)
- 8 December - Johann von Berenberg-Gossler, banker (born 1839)
- 22 December – Theodor Kaes, neurologist (born 1852)
