= 1832 in Germany =

- Decades: 1810s; 1820s; 1830s; 1840s; 1850s
- See also: Other events of 1832; History of Germany • Timeline • Years

Events from the year 1832 in Germany.

== Incumbents ==
- King of Bavaria – Ludwig I
- King of Prussia – Frederick William III
- King of Saxony – Anthony
- King of Württemberg – William I
- Grand Duke of Baden – Leopold

== Events ==
- 30 May – The Hambacher Fest, a demonstration for civil liberties and national unity, ends with no result.
- 15 December – The CGS system goes back to a proposal in 1832 by the German mathematician Carl Friedrich Gauss to base a system of absolute units on the three fundamental units of length.

=== Undated ===
- The first Baedeker guidebook, Voyage du Rhin de Mayence à Cologne, is published in Koblenz.
- Publication begins (posthumously) of Carl von Clausewitz's Vom Kriege ("On War").
- Weimar Classicism ends with death of Johann Wolfgang von Goethe
- Work Faust, Part Two by Johann Wolfgang von Goethe published.
- Work Maler Nolten by Eduard Mörike is published.
- Song Ihr Kinderlein, kommet by Christoph von Schmid is published.
- Opera Die Hochzeit by Richard Wagner
- Symphony in C major by Richard Wagner
- String Quintet No. 1 b by Felix Mendelssohn revised

== Births ==
- 21 January – Carl Hubert von Wendt, German politician (died 1903)
- 24 January – Albert Arnz, German painter (died 1914)
- 25 January – Paul Bronsart von Schellendorff, Prussian general (died 1891)
- 28 January – Franz Wüllner, German composer (died 1902)
- 29 January – Wilhelm Böckmann, German architect (died 1902)
- 30 January – Karl von Thielen, German politician (died 1906)
- 13 February – Wilhelm Müller, German pathologist, (died 1909)
- 21 February – Louis Maurer, German American lithographer (died 1932)
- 10 March – Heinrich Bellermann, German music theorist (died 1903)
- 4 April – Fedor Flinzer, German writer (died 1911)
- 8 April – Alfred von Waldersee, German fieldmarshall (died 1904)
- 15 April – Wilhelm Busch, German humorist, poet, illustrator and painter (died 1908)
- 7 May – Heinrich Julius Holtzmann, German protestant theologian (died 1910)
- 12 May – Carl von Perbandt, German landscape painter (died 1911)
- 14 May – Rudolf Lipschitz, German mathematician (died 1903)
- 18 May – Heinrich XIV, Prince Reuss Younger Line (died 1913)
- 10 June – Nicolaus Otto, German engineer (died 1891)
- 1 July – Karl Binz, German pharmacologist (died 1913)
- 19 July – Julius von Verdy du Vernois, German general (died 1910)
- 7 August – Max Lange, German writer, publisher and chess player (died 1899)
- 8 August – George, King of Saxony (died 1904)
- 9 August – Alexander von Monts, German officer (died 1889)
- 16 August – Wilhelm Wundt, German physiologist and psychologist (died 1920)
- 1 September – Hermann Steudner, German botanist (died 1863)
- 2 October – Julius von Sachs, German botanist (died 1897)
- 6 October:
  - August Eisenlohr, German egyptologist (died 1902)
  - Christian Mali, German painter and art professor (died 1906)
- 21 October – Gustav Langenscheidt, German publisher (died 1895)
- 22 October – Robert Eitner, German musicologist, researcher and bibliographer (died 1905)
- 24 September – Gustav Frank, German theologian (died 1904)
- 9 November – Adele Spitzeder, German actress and folk singer (died 1895)
- 15 November – Hermann Ottomar Herzog, German American landscape painter (died 1932)
- 18 November – John Gottlieb Auer, German Anglican bishop (died 1874)
- 12 December – Adolf von Arnim-Boitzenburg, German politician (died 1887)
- 16 December – Wilhelm Julius Foerster, German astronomer (died 1921)

== Deaths ==
- 17 January – August Friedrich Ferdinand von der Goltz, German politician (born 1765)
- 15 February – Hardenack Otto Conrad Zinck, German-Danish composer (born 1746)
- 23 February – Wolf Heidenheim, German exegete (born 1757)
- 12 March – Friedrich Kuhlau, German Danish composer (born 1786)
- 22 March – Johann Wolfgang von Goethe, German writer (born 1749)
- 28 March – Lazarus Bendavid, German mathematician and philosopher (born 1762)
- 30 March – Dora Stock, German portrait painter (born 1760)
- 15 April – Adam Eberle, German painter (born 1804)
- 21 April – Karl Wilhelm Ferdinand Unzelmann, German actor and opera singer (born 1753)
- 24 April – Friedrich Gottlob Hayne, German botanist and taxonomist (born 1763)
- 7 May – Christian Gottfried Schütz, German classical scholar and humanist (born 1747)
- 15 May – Carl Friedrich Zelter, German composer (born 1758)
- 20 May – Johann Birnbaum, German jurist (born 1763)
- 9 June – Friedrich von Gentz, German diplomat and writer (born 1764)
- 21 June – Princess Amalie of Hesse-Darmstadt (born 1754)
- 19 July – Karl Julius Weber, German writer (born 1767)
- 23 August – Johann Georg Wagler, German herpetologist and ornithologist (born 1800)
- 27 September – Karl Christian Friedrich Krause, German philosopher (born 1781)
- 1 November – Julius von Voss, German writer (born 1768)
- 8 November – Karl August von Beckers zu Westerstetten, Bavarian general (born 1770)
- 29 November – Karl Rudolphi, German-Swedish biologist and naturalist (born 1771)
- 29 December – Johann Friedrich Cotta, German publisher (born 1764)
