= 1758 in Germany =

- Decades
- See also: Other events of 1758; History of Germany • Timeline • Years

Events from the year 1758 in Germany.

== Incumbents ==
- Electorate of Bavaria – Maximilian III Joseph
- King of Prussia – Frederick II
- Electorate of Saxony – Augustus III
- Electorate of Hanover – George II
- Duchy of Württemberg – Charles Eugene
- Grand Duke of Baden – Charles Frederick

== Events ==
- 15 March – 18 April – Siege of Schweidnitz
- 5 April – Founding of Ludwigsburg porcelain
- 4 May – 2 July – Siege of Olomouc
- 12 June – Seven Years' War – Battle of Rheinberg
- 23 June – Seven Years' War – Battle of Krefeld: Anglo-Hanoverian forces under Ferdinand of Brunswick defeat the French.
- 30 June – Seven Years' War – Battle of Domstadtl: Austrian forces under Ernst Gideon von Laudon and Joseph von Siskovits rout an enormous convoy with supplies for the Prussian army, guarded by strong troops of Hans Joachim von Zieten.
- 23 July – Battle of Sandershausen
- 5 August – Battle of Mehr
- 25 August – Seven Years' War – Battle of Zorndorf: Frederick defeats the Russian army of Count Wilhelm Fermor near the Oder.
- 26 September – Battle of Tornow
- 28 September – Battle of Fehrbellin
- 10 October – Seven Years' War – Battle of Lutterberg
- 14 October – Seven Years' War: Battle of Hochkirch: Frederick loses a hard-fought battle against the Austrians under Marshal Leopold von Daun, who besieges Dresden.
- 18 November – Battle of Güstow
- December 1757 – June 1758 – Blockade of Stralsund

=== Undated ===
- Siege of Küstrin
- Construction of the Basilica of St. John the Baptist, Saarbrücken is completed.
- German company MAN is founded.

== Births ==
- 8 April in Mannheim – Peter Joseph Krahe, German architect (died 1840)
- 26 June in Schleiz – Christian Gottlieb Reichard, German cartographer (died 1837)
- 26 July in Reisbach (Vils) – Maximus von Imhof German physicist (died 1817)
- 5 October in Braunschweig – August Lafontaine, German novelist (died 1831)
- 22 October in Hanover – Friedrich Rehberg, German portrait and historical painter (died 1835)
- 26 October in Dettingen unter Teck – Christian Friedrich von Otto, Württemberger official and politician (died 1836)
- 21 November in Schwedt – Duke Eugen of Württemberg (died 1822)
- 11 December - Carl Friedrich Zelter, German composer and conductor (died 1832)
- Undated in Troisdorf – Moritz Kellerhoven German portrait painter and etcher (died 1830)

== Deaths ==
- 16 January in Trier – Oliver Legipont, German Benedictine bibliographer (born 1698)
- 10 May in Leipzig – Christian Gottlieb Jöcher, German academic, librarian and lexicographer (born 1694)
- 28 May in Weimar – Ernest Augustus II, Duke of Saxe-Weimar-Eisenach (born 1737)
- 3 August in Sande, Lower Saxony – Albert Brahms, Frisian dike judge (born 1692)
- 3 September in Hanover – George William Alberti, German essayist and theologian, (born 1723)
