= 1838 in Germany =

- Decades: 1810s; 1820s; 1830s; 1840s; 1850s
- See also: Other events of 1838; History of Germany • Timeline • Years

Events from the year 1838 in Germany

== Incumbents ==
- Kingdom of Prussia
  - Monarch – Frederick William III (16 November 1798 – 7 June 1840)
- Kingdom of Bavaria
  - Monarch - Ludwig I (1825–1848)
  - Prime Minister – Karl von Abel (1837–1847)
- Kingdom of Saxony
  - Frederick Augustus (1836–1854)
- Kingdom of Hanover– Ernest Augustus (1837–1851)
- Kingdom of Württemberg – William (1816–1864)

== Events ==
=== Date unknown ===
- Friedrich Bessel makes the first accurate measurement of distance to a star.

== Births ==
- January 6- Max Bruch, German composer (d. 1920)
- January 16 – Franz Brentano, German philosopher, psychologist (d. 1917)
- June 24 – Gustav von Schmoller, German economist (d. 1917)
- July 8 – Ferdinand von Zeppelin, German military officer, founder of the Zeppelin Company (d. 1917)

== Deaths ==
- February 24 – Christoph Johann von Medem, German courtier (b. 1763)
- April 12 – Johann Adam Möhler, German theologian (born 1796)
- June 14 – Maximilian von Montgelas, Bavarian statesman (b. 1759)
- August 21 – Adelbert von Chamisso, German writer (b. 1781)
- November 9 – Friedrich Carl Gröger, north-German portrait painter and lithographer (born 1766)

== Bibliography ==
Van der Kiste, John (2004), George III's Children (revised ed.), Stroud, United Kingdom: Sutton Publishing Ltd, ISBN 978-0-7509-3438-1
