= 1839 in Germany =

- Decades: 1810s; 1820s; 1830s; 1840s; 1850s
- See also: Other events of 1839; History of Germany • Timeline • Years

Events from the year 1839 in Germany

== Incumbents ==
- Kingdom of Prussia
  - Monarch – Frederick William III (16 November 1797 – 7 June 1840)
- Kingdom of Bavaria
  - Monarch - Ludwig I (1825–1848)
  - Prime Minister – Karl von Abel (1837–1847)
- Kingdom of Saxony
  - Frederick Augustus (1836–1854)
- Kingdom of Hanover– Ernest Augustus (1837–1851)
- Kingdom of Württemberg – William (1816–1864)

== Events ==
- April 7- The first long-distance railway opened Leipzig-Dresden railway.
- April 19- The Duchy of Limburg created in 1839 from parts of the Dutch Province of Limburg as a result of the Treaty of London and part of German Confederation.
- April 19- Britain, Prussia, France and the Netherlands agree to the Treaty of London that guaranteed the neutrality of Belgium.

== Births ==
- January 4 - Carl Humann, German archaeologist (d. 1896)
- April 3 – Karl, Freiherr von Prel, German philosopher (d. 1899)
- July 12 - Jean Baptiste Holzmayer, German archaeologist (d. 1890)
- July 17- Friedrich Gernsheim (1839–1916), German composer, conductor and pianist.
- October 2 – Hans Thoma, German painter (died 1924)
- November 20 – Christian Wilberg, German painter (d. 1882)

== Deaths ==
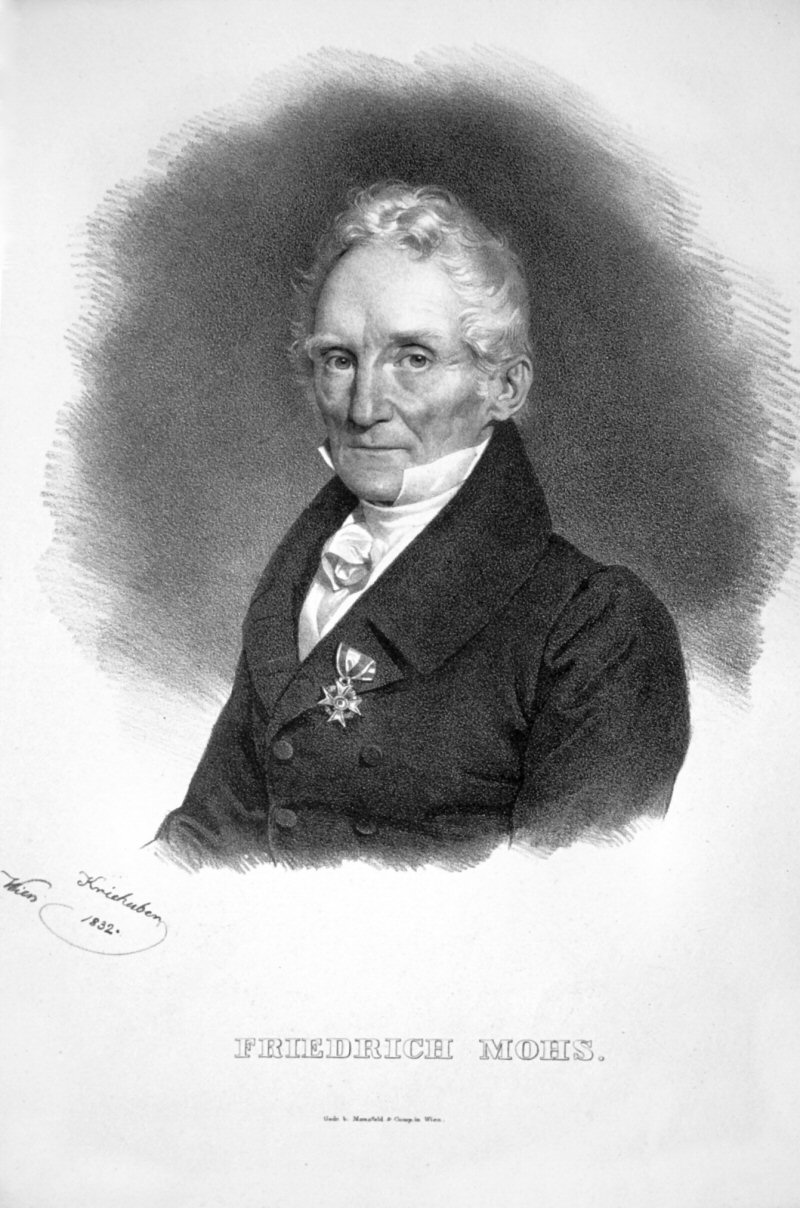
Friedrich Mohs

- January 6 – Princess Marie of Orléans, Duchess of Wurtenberg (b. 1813)
- January 12 – Joseph Anton Koch, Austrian painter of the German Romantic movement (born 1768) March 20 – Caspar Voght, German businessman (b. 1752)
- August 3 – Dorothea von Schlegel, German novelist and translator (born 1764)
- September 4 – Hermann Olshausen, German theologian (born 1796)
- September 29 – Friedrich Mohs, German geologist, mineralogist (b. 1773)
- November 18 – Wilhelmine von Wrochem, flutist, singer and actress (b. 1798)

== Bibliography ==
Van der Kiste, John (2004), George III's Children (revised ed.), Stroud, United Kingdom: Sutton Publishing Ltd, ISBN 978-0-7509-3438-1
