= 1841 in Germany =

- Decades: 1820s; 1830s; 1840s; 1850s; 1860s
- See also: Other events of 1841; History of Germany • Timeline • Years

Events from the year 1841 in Germany

== Incumbents ==
- Kingdom of Prussia
  - Monarch – Friedrich Wilhelm IV (1840–1861)
- Kingdom of Bavaria
  - Monarch – Ludwig I (1825–1848)
  - Prime Minister – Karl von Abel (1837–1847)
- Kingdom of Saxony
  - Frederick Augustus (1836–1854)
- Kingdom of Hanover– Ernest Augustus (1837–1851)
- Kingdom of Württemberg – William (1816–1864)

== Events ==
11 July – German emigrants set sail for Australia, on the Skjold.

== Births ==
- February 24 – Carl Gräbe, German chemist (d. 1927)
- March 21 – Mathilde Blind, German-born English poet (died 1896)
- April 3 – Hermann Carl Vogel, German astrophysicist, astronomer (d. 1907)
- June 19 – Hermann Eduard von Holst, German historian (died 1904)
- August 12 – Franz Heinrich Schwechten, German architect (died 1924)

== Deaths ==
- February 21 – Dorothea Tieck, German translator (born 1799)
- May 23 – Franz Xaver von Baader, German philosopher, theologian (b. 1765)
- August 11 – Johann Friedrich Herbart, German philosopher (born 1776)
- October 9 – Karl Friedrich Schinkel, German architect (b. 1781)
- October 31 – Georg Anton Friedrich Ast, German philologist and philosopher (born 1778)

== Bibliography ==
Van der Kiste, John (2004), George III's Children (revised ed.), Stroud, United Kingdom: Sutton Publishing Ltd, ISBN 978-0-7509-3438-1
