= 1842 in Germany =

- Decades: 1820s; 1830s; 1840s; 1850s; 1860s
- See also: Other events of 1842; History of Germany • Timeline • Years

Events from the year 1842 in Germany.

== Incumbents ==
- Kingdom of Prussia –
  - Monarch – Friedrich Wilhelm IV (1840–1861)
- Kingdom of Bavaria
  - Monarch - Ludwig I (1825–1848)
  - Prime Minister – Karl von Abel (1837–1847)
- Kingdom of Saxony – Frederick Augustus (1836–1854)
- Kingdom of Hanover– Ernest Augustus (1837–1851)
- Kingdom of Württemberg – William (1816–1864)

== Events ==
- The Great fire of Hamburg began early on May 5, 1842, in Deichstraße and burned until the morning of May 8, destroying about one third of the buildings in the Altstadt.
- The Walhalla is a hall of fame that honours laudable and distinguished people in German history – "politicians, sovereigns, scientists and artists of the German tongue" completed in 1842.

== Births ==
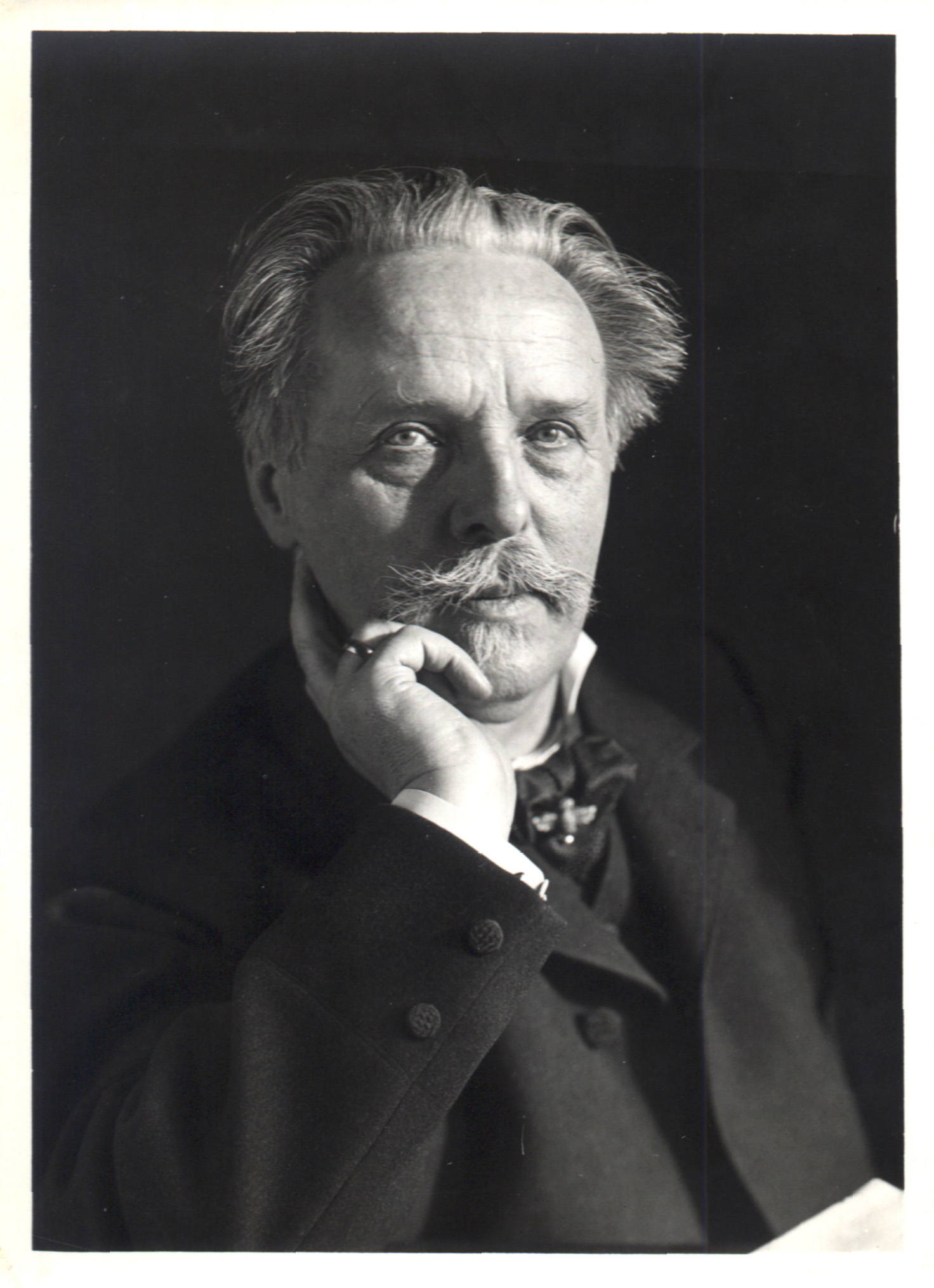
Karl May

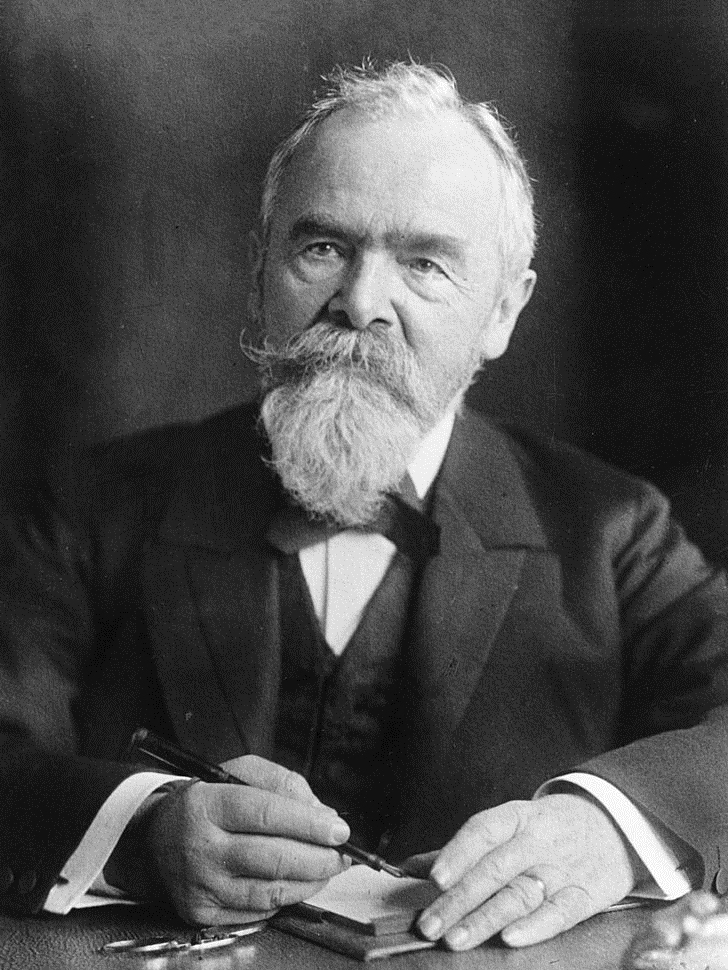
Carl von Linde

- February 23 – Karl Robert Eduard von Hartmann, German philosopher (d. 1906)
- February 25 – Karl May, German writer (d. 1912)
- June 11 – Carl von Linde, German scientist, engineer (d. 1934)
- July 2 – Albert Ladenburg, German chemist (d. 1911)
- July 4 – Hermann Cohen, German-Jewish philosopher (d. 1918)

== Deaths ==
- January 12 – Johanna Stegen, German heroine (b. 1793)
- March 6 – Constanze Mozart, German-born wife of Wolfgang Amadeus Mozart (b.1762)

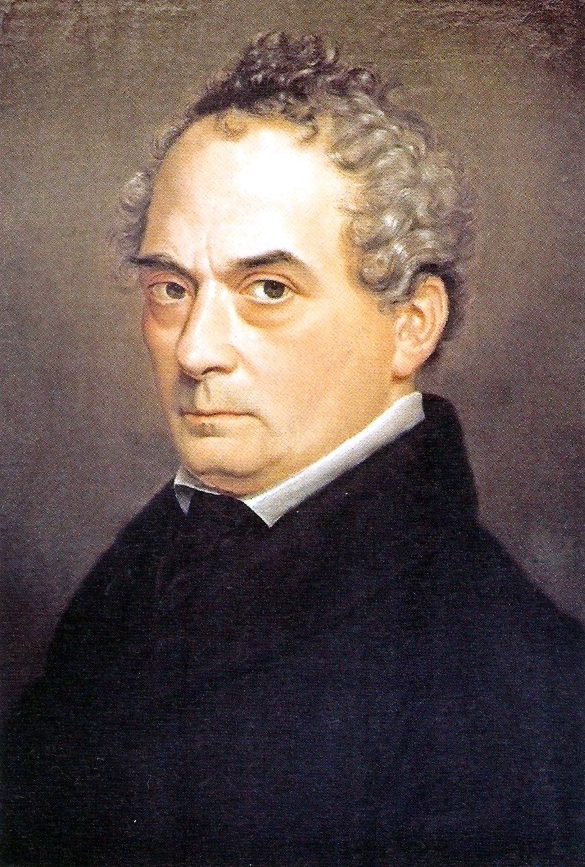
Clemens Brentano

- July 28 – Clemens Brentano, German poet (b. 1778)

== Bibliography ==
Van der Kiste, John (2004), George III's Children (revised ed.), Stroud, United Kingdom: Sutton Publishing Ltd, ISBN 978-0-7509-3438-1
