= Angely =

Angely or Angély is a French name that may refer to:

== People ==
- Anthony Angély (born 1990), Martiniquais footballer
- Barbara Angely, stage name of Barbara Warren (1943-2008), Austrian-American model and triathlete
- Louis Angely (1787-1835), German actor

== Places ==
- Angely, Yonne, Bourgogne-Franche-Comté, France
- Saint-Jean-d'Angély, Charente-Maritime, France
