= 1837 in Germany =

- Decades: 1810s; 1820s; 1830s; 1840s; 1850s
- See also: Other events of 1837; History of Germany • Timeline • Years

Events from the year 1837 in Germany

== Incumbents ==
- Kingdom of Prussia
  - Monarch – Frederick William III (16 November 1797 – 7 June 1840)
- Kingdom of Bavaria
  - Monarch - Ludwig I (1825–1848)
  - Prime Minister – Karl von Abel (1837–1847)
- Kingdom of Saxony
  - Frederick Augustus (1836–1854)
- Kingdom of Hanover–
  - 26 June 1830 until his death in 1837 William IV
  - from 20 June Ernest Augustus (1837–1851)
- Kingdom of Württemberg – William (1816–1864)

== Events ==
- June 20 – Queen Victoria, 18, accedes to the throne of the United Kingdom, on the death of her uncle William IV without legitimate heirs (she will reign for more than 63 years). Under Salic law, the Kingdom of Hanover passes to William's brother, Ernest Augustus, Duke of Cumberland, ending the personal union of Britain and Hanover which has persisted since 1714.

=== Date unknown ===
- The 5th century B.C. Berlin Foundry Cup is acquired, for the Antikensammlung Berlin in Germany.

== Births ==
- May 7 – Karl Mauch, German explorer (d. 1875)
- May 9- Adam Opel, German engineer, industrialist (d. 1895)
- June 22- Paul Bachmann, German mathematician (d. 1920)
- September 12 – Louis IV, Grand Duke of Hesse (d. 1892)
- October 26 – Carl Koldewey, German explorer famous for the German North Polar Expedition (d. 1908)
- November 5 – Arnold Janssen, German-born Catholic priest, saint (d. 1909)
- December 24- Cosima Wagner, wife of German composer Richard Wagner (d. 1930)

== Deaths ==
- January 8 – Duke Wilhelm in Bavaria, Great-grandfather of Empress Elisabeth of Austria (b. 1752)
- February 19 – Georg Büchner, German playwright (b. 1813)
- June 20 - William IV King of Hannover (b. 1765)

== Bibliography ==
Van der Kiste, John (2004), George III's Children (revised ed.), Stroud, United Kingdom: Sutton Publishing Ltd, ISBN 978-0-7509-3438-1
