= Carl Wendt =

Carl Wendt may refer to:

- Carl Hubert von Wendt (1832–1903), German landowner and politician
- Carl Alexander Wendt (1923–2006), Norwegian police leader
- Carl von Wendt (born 1953), Swedish curler
