= Jovan Stejić =

19th century Serbian doctor

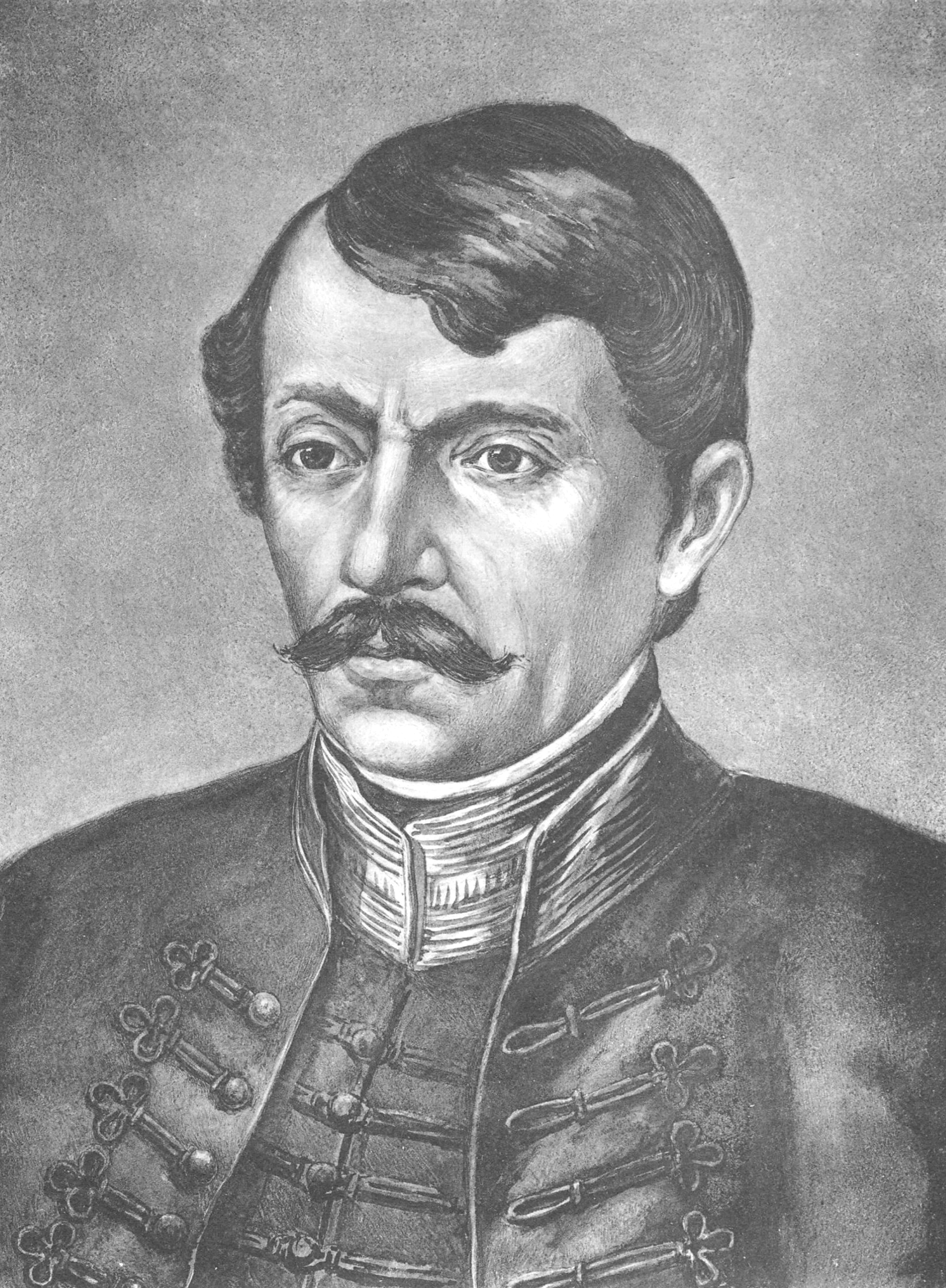
- Born: 1803; Arad County, Kingdom of Hungary
- Died: November 23, 1853 (aged 49–50); Belgrade, Principality of Serbia
- Other names: Јован Стејић (in modern Serbian Cyrillic)

Jovan Stejić (Stari Arad, Kingdom of Hungary, 1803 – Belgrade, Principality of Serbia, 23 November 1853) was a Serbian writer, philologist, critic of Vuk Karadžić's reform and medical doctor.

== Biography ==
Jovan Stejić is the first Serb Doctor of Medicine who came to work in Principality of Serbia. He was Prince Miloš Obrenović's personal physician, founder of the Serbian Civil Medical Corps, one of the founders of the Society of Serbian Letters (later the Serbian Academy of Science and Arts), and the author of many scientific and literary works and publications. Upon his arrival organized civil health service in Serbia started to function.

He often collaborated in the "Gazette" of Society of Serbian Letters and was its editor at one time. He was also a newspaper medical editor for Dnevnik and the Serbian National Journal.

== Selected work ==
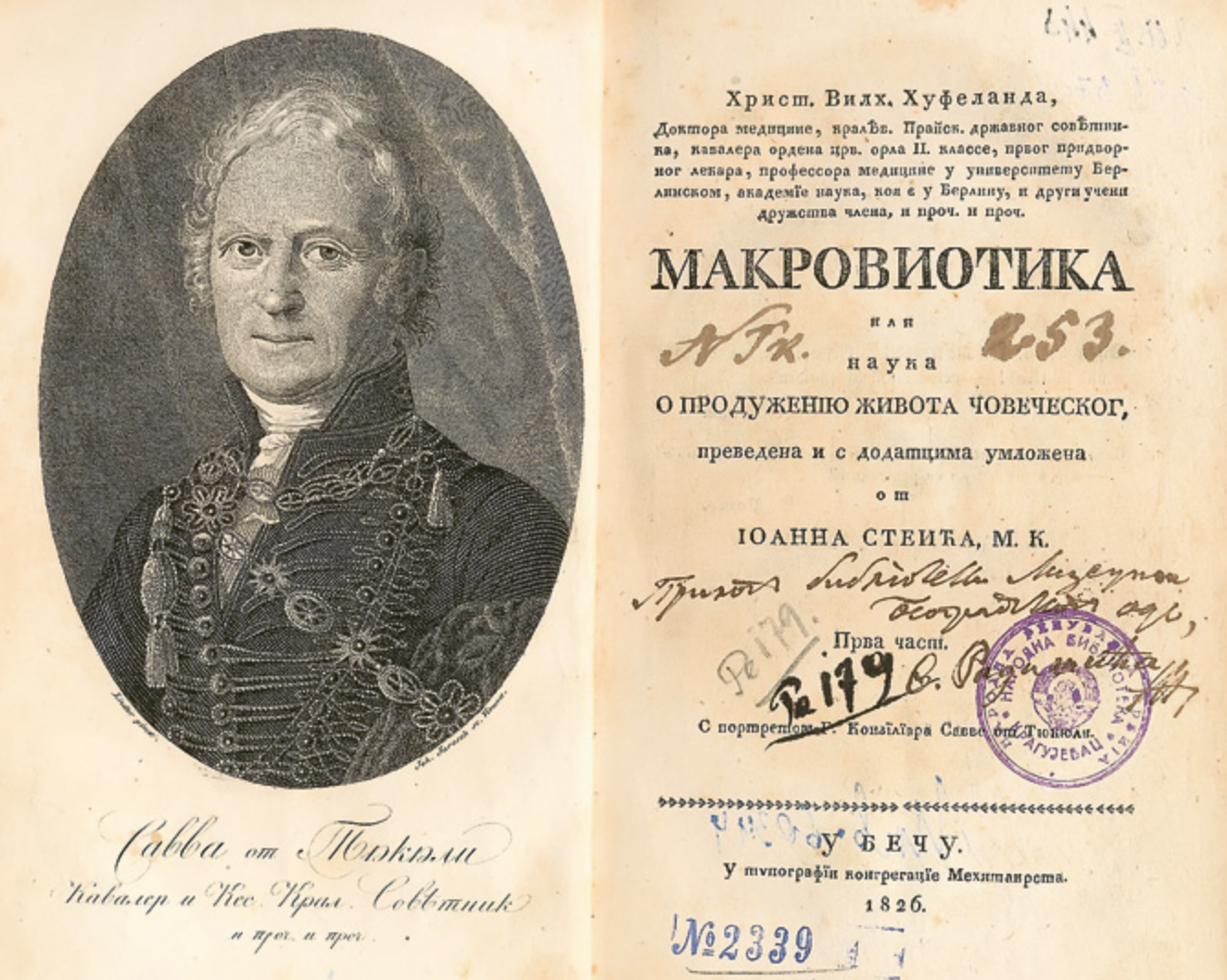
Cover page of Stejić's Makroviotika, 1826

- Proverbs of diversity (1839)
- What do I need to eat and drink (1842)
- About the Country, from Karl Julius Weber's Democritus (1847)
- Europe, from the national vocabulary of Roteka and Welker (1849)
- Criticism of Vuk's translation of the New Testament (1850),
- Anthropology of the science of man (1853)
- Proposal for Serbian language and Serbian grammar, (1853) which he published as vice president of the Society of Serbian Letters and which is a continuation of the controversy regarding the reform of Vuk`s spelling, dating from 1832.
- Proposal for Serbian vocabulary and Serbian grammar (1866)
- Fun for the mind and heart
- Makrobiotika or science of extending the life of mankind, I-II, (1826). It was printed in Vienna in 1826 and is his most valuable work. It represents the Serbian translation of textbooks, an encyclopedic guide from German clinician Christoph Wilhelm Hufeland. The book was dedicated to his benefactor Sava Tekelija.
- Drunkenness, (1827) a scientific approach to the causes and consequences, as well as ways of treating alcoholics. Published in the Yearbook of "Matica Srpska".
- Fun for the mind and heart I-V, He printed five volumes of collections of articles with health lessons, reprinted several times (Vienna, 1828, Buda 1831, Zemun, 1834, Buda, 1836 and Novi Sad, 1839). The third book is a translated text from other authors under the name of "Wise words from various writers". The fourth book "Views of mental Science" is written for the general public.
- Anthropology, or the science of man for Youth (1850)
- Serbian orthography, (1852) in which he expressed his opinion regarding the necessity of accepting the new terms and expressions in different areas of science.

He also translated parts of Lucian of Samosata, August von Kotzebue, Hugues Felicité Robert de Lamennais, and some of Rabnera's brilliant German satires. He read Sir Walter Scott and recommended him to dramatist Joakim Vujić and novelist Milovan Vidaković.
