= Wilhelmine von Wrochem =

German flutist, singer and actress (1798–1839)

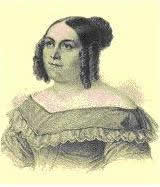
- Born: Wilhelmine Schulz; 17 December 1798; Berlin, Kingdom of Prussia
- Died: 18 November 1839 (aged 40); Berlin, Kingdom of Prussia
- Other names: Wilhelmine Dötsch
- Occupations: Flutist, opera singer, actress
- Spouses: Dötsch (m. 1821; died 1822); von Wrochem (m. 1830)

Wilhelmine von Wrochem (née Schulz; 17 December 1798 – 18 November 1839) was a German flutist, soprano opera singer and stage actress.

== Early life ==
Wilhelmine Schulz was born on 17 December 1798 in Berlin to flutist and chamber musician A. Schulz. She was also the sister of the flutist and composer Carl Schulz. At an early age, she displayed a talent for music, which was nurtured by her father, who taught her how to play the flute. She became a virtuoso flutist and gained widespread acclaim and attention in Berlin and other cities. Her first public concert took place in 1817 in Berlin with the violinist Friederike Klinsing. Wrochem's rendition of a flute concerto by Benoit Tranquille Berbiguier was praised for having "great skill and good tone". After the concert, she toured with Klinsing. Despite her success as a flutist, she preferred to sing so she subsequently pursued studies in both singing and acting. After working as a chorister, she was accepted as a member of the Berlin State Opera in 1820. The following year, she married the stage opera's choir director Dötsch, however he died a year later.

== Career ==
Following a three-year engagement at the state opera, she made her first guest appearance in Hamburg, where the management offered her a permanent position. However, Schulz declined this offer out of loyalty to the Berlin State Opera. Upon her return to Berlin, she began to act on stage, receiving positive reviews and quickly gaining popularity as an actress. Initially, she was known for her romantic and supporting roles but later became recognized for portraying comical old women. She was particularly known and praised for her performances in various plays by Louis Angely.

== Second marriage and death ==
In 1830, she married for the second time to the royal justice commissioner and notary von Wrochem.

Her increasing popularity with both audiences and theatre management resulted in her receiving a decree from the king granting her a lifelong employment as a member of the state opera in 1836.

At 5pm on 18 November 1839, Wrochem died in Berlin from childbirth complications, at the age of 40.
