= Pösing =

- Municipality
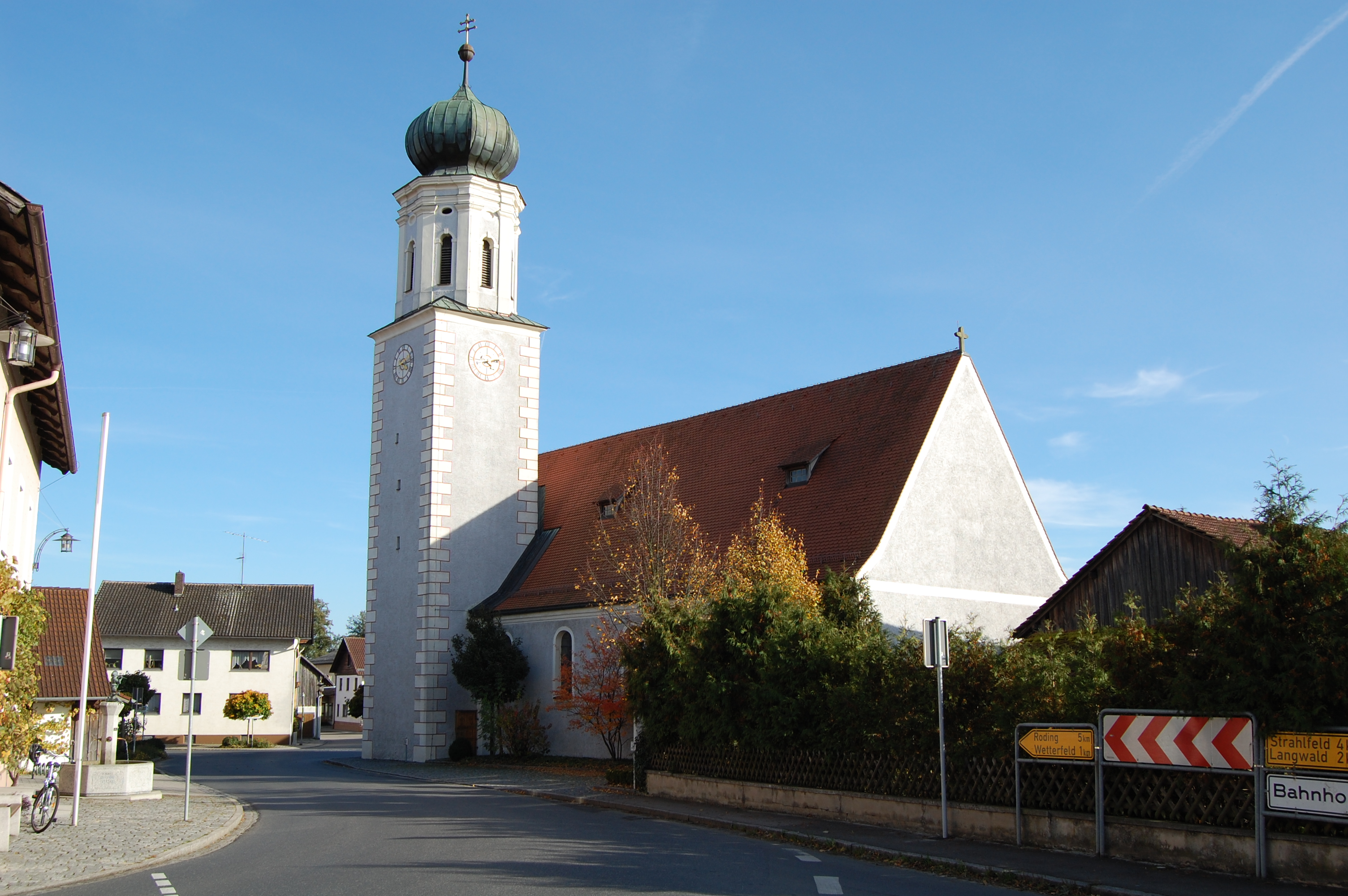
- Saint Vitus Church

- Coat of arms

- Location of Pösing within Cham district
- Interactive map of Pösing
- Location within Germany Location within Bavaria
- Coordinates: 49°14′N 12°33′E
- Country: Germany
- State: Bavaria
- Admin. region: Oberpfalz
- District: Cham
- Municipal assoc.: Stamsried

Government
  - Mayor (2020–26): Michael Reith (CSU)

Area
  - Total: 9.13 km^{2} (3.53 sq mi)
- Elevation: 364 m (1,194 ft)

Population (2025-12-31)
  - Total: 1,004
  - Density: 110/km^{2} (285/sq mi)
- Time zone: UTC+01:00 (CET)
  - Summer (DST): UTC+02:00 (CEST)
- Postal codes: 93483
- Dialling codes: 09461
- Vehicle registration: CHA
- Website: www.poesing.de

Pösing (German pronunciation: [ˈpøːzɪŋ]) is a municipality in the district of Cham in Bavaria in Germany.
