= 1840 in Germany =

- Decades: 1820s; 1830s; 1840s; 1850s; 1860s
- See also: Other events of 1840; History of Germany • Timeline • Years

Events from the year 1840 in Germany

== Incumbents ==
- Kingdom of Prussia
  - Monarch –
    - Frederick William III (16 November 1797 – 7 June 1840)
    - Friedrich Wilhelm IV (7 June 1840 – 2 January 1861)
- Kingdom of Bavaria
  - Monarch – Ludwig I (1825–1848)
  - Prime Minister – Karl von Abel (1837–1847)
- Kingdom of Saxony
  - Frederick Augustus (1836–1854)
- Kingdom of Hanover– Ernest Augustus (1837–1851)
- Kingdom of Württemberg – William (1816–1864)

== Events ==
- June 7 – On the death of Frederick William III of Prussia, he is succeeded on the throne of the Kingdom of Prussia (which he has ruled for more than 40 years) by his eldest son Frederick William IV.
- July 15 – The Austrian Empire, the United Kingdom, the Kingdom of Prussia, and the Russian Empire sign the Convention of London with the Sublime Porte, ruler of the Ottoman Empire.
- The Rhine crisis of 1840 was a diplomatic crisis between the Kingdom of France and the German Confederation.

== Births ==
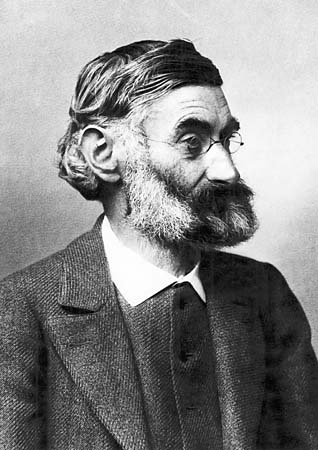
Ernst Abbe

- January 23 – Ernst Abbe, German physicist (d. 1905)
- February 22 – August Bebel, German politician (d. 1913)
- March 8 – Eduard von Knorr, German admiral (d. 1920)
- March 16 – Georg von der Gabelentz, German linguist and sinologist (d. 1893)
- March 28 – Emin Pasha, German doctor, African administrator (d. 1892)
- July 2 – Ludwig Rosenthal, German antiquarian bookseller (d. 1928)
- August 4 – Richard von Krafft-Ebing, German sexologist (d. 1902)

== Deaths ==
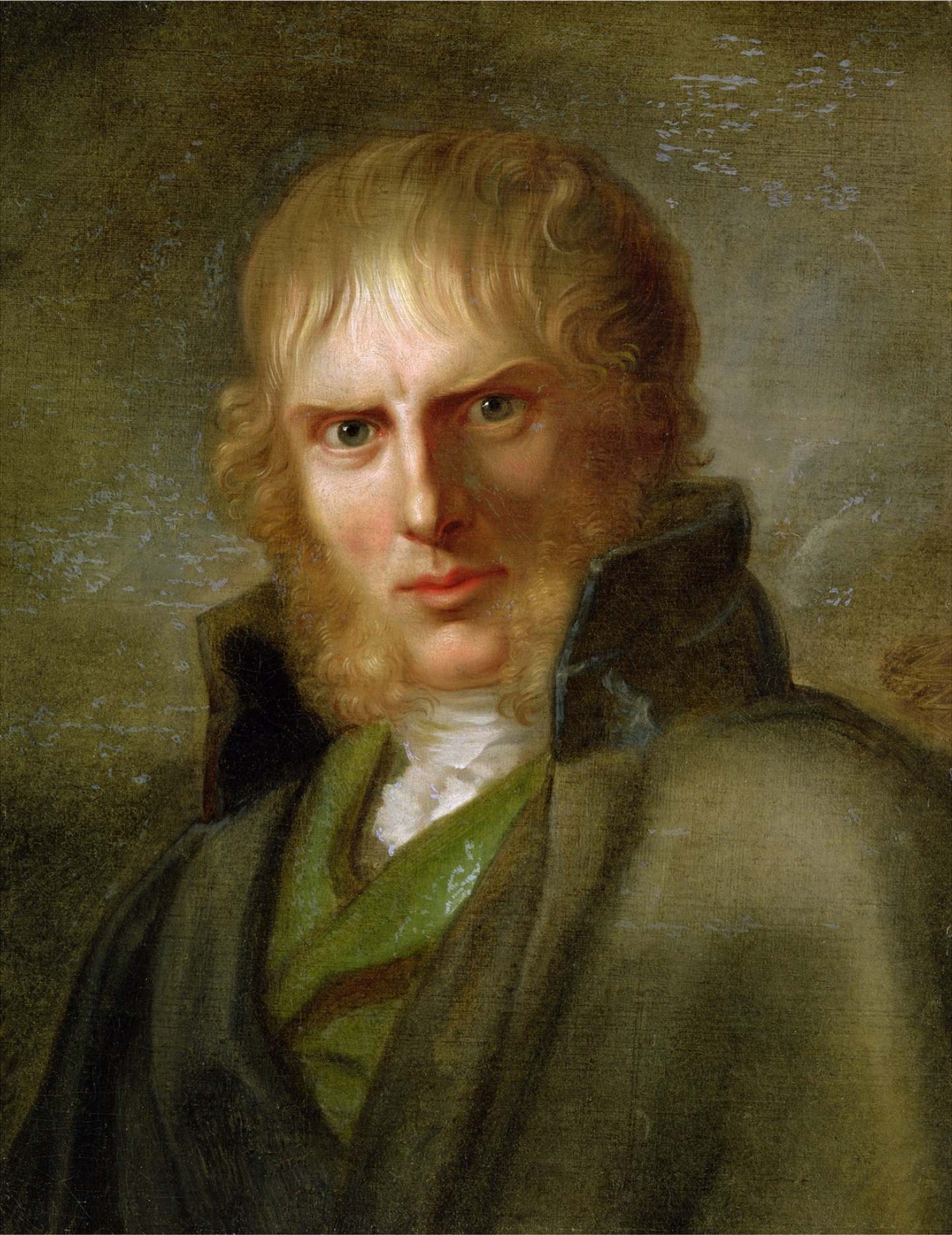
Caspar David Friedrich

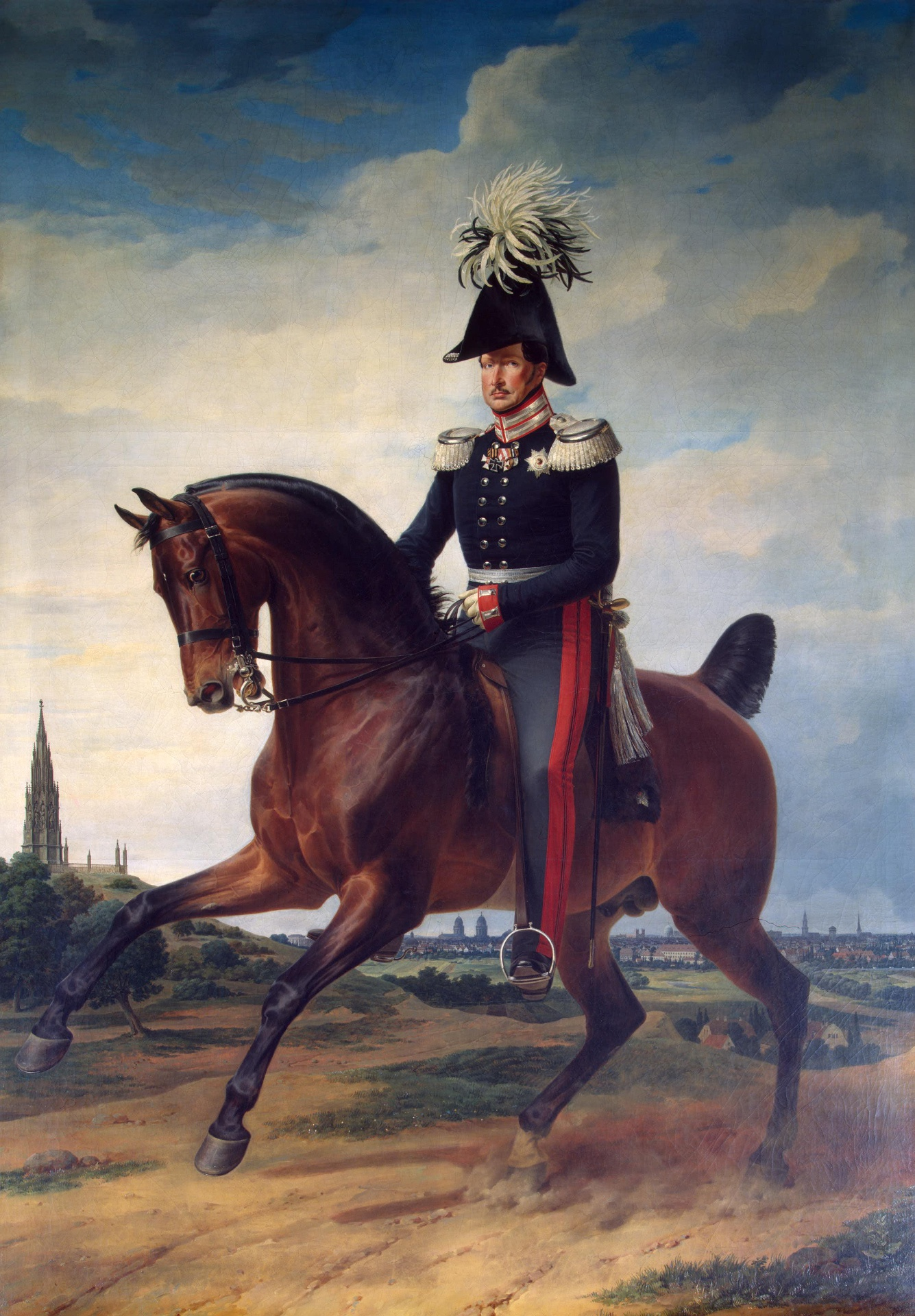
Frederick William III of Prussia

- January 22 – Johann Friedrich Blumenbach, German anthropologist (b. 1752)
- March 2 – Heinrich Wilhelm Matthias Olbers (b. 1758), German astronomer.
- May 7 – Caspar David Friedrich, German artist (b. 1774)
- May 11 – Eduard Joseph d'Alton, German engraver and naturalist (b. 1772)
- May 14 – Carl Ludvig Engel, German-Finnish architect (b. 1778)
- June 7 – King Frederick William III of Prussia (b. 1770)
- July 4 – Karl Ferdinand von Gräfe (born 1787), German surgeon.
- July 6 – Johann Heinrich Ramberg, German painter and printmaker (b. 1763)
- July 23 – Carl Blechen, German painter, specializing in fantastic landscapes with demons and grotesque figures (b. 1798)
- August 25 – Karl Leberecht Immermann, German novelist, dramatist (b. 1796)

== Bibliography ==
Van der Kiste, John (2004), George III's Children (revised ed.), Stroud, United Kingdom: Sutton Publishing Ltd, ISBN 978-0-7509-3438-1
