= Stamsried (Verwaltungsgemeinschaft) =

- Verwaltungsgemeinschaft
- Location of Stamsried within Cham district
- Interactive map of Stamsried
- Location within Germany Location within Bavaria
- Coordinates: 49°16′N 12°32′E
- Country: Germany
- State: Bavaria
- Admin. region: Upper Palatinate
- District: Cham
- Seat: Stamsried
- Subdivisions: 2 municipalities

Area
  - Total: 52.55 km^{2} (20.29 sq mi)

Population (2025-12-31)
  - Total: 3,223
  - Density: 61.33/km^{2} (158.8/sq mi)
- Time zone: UTC+01:00 (CET)
  - Summer (DST): UTC+02:00 (CEST)
- Website: www.stamsried.de

Stamsried is a Verwaltungsgemeinschaft (municipal association) in the district of Cham in Bavaria, Germany. Its seat is in Stamsried. It consists of the following municipalities:

1. Pösing
2. Stamsried
