= 1836 in Germany =

- Decades: 1810s; 1820s; 1830s; 1840s; 1850s
- See also: Other events of 1836; History of Germany • Timeline • Years

Events from the year 1836 in Germany

== Incumbents ==
- Kingdom of Prussia
  - Monarch – Frederick William III (16 November 1797 – 7 June 1840)
- Kingdom of Bavaria
  - Monarch - Ludwig I (1825–1848)
  - Prime Minister – Karl von Abel (1837–1847)
- Kingdom of Saxony
  - Anthony (5 May 1827 – 6 June 1836)
  - Frederick Augustus (6 June 1836–1854)
- Kingdom of Hanover
  - William IV (26 June 1830 to 1837)
- Kingdom of Württemberg
  - William (1816–1864)

== Events ==
- March 29 – Richard Wagner's opera Das Liebesverbot is performed for the first time, in Magdeburg.
- October 13 – Theodor Fliedner, a Lutheran minister, and Friederike, his wife, open the Deaconess Home and Hospital at Kaiserswerth, Germany, as an institute to train women in nursing.
- October 16 – Alte Pinakothek in Munich opened.
- The dissertation of the German writer Georg Büchner on the common barbel (fish), Barbus barbus, "Mémoire sur le Système Nerveux du Barbeaux (Cyprinus barbus L.)", appears in Paris and Strasbourg. After receiving his doctorate, he is appointed in October by the University of Zurich as a lecturer in anatomy.

== Births ==
- May 25 – Lina von Perbandt, German landscape painter (died 1884)
- May 28
  - – Friedrich Baumfelder, German composer, conductor, and pianist (d. 1916)
  - – Alexander Mitscherlich (died 1918), German chemist.
- October 6 – Heinrich Wilhelm Gottfried von Waldeyer-Hartz, German neuroanatomist (d. 1921)

== Deaths ==
- January 1 – Bernhard Meyer, German physician, ornithologist (b. 1767)
- January 16 – Heinrich Christoph Kolbe, German portrait painter (born 1771)
- August 25 – Christoph Wilhelm Hufeland, German physician (b. 1762)
- September 12 – Christian Dietrich Grabbe, German playwright (b. 1801)
