= Stamsried =

- Municipality
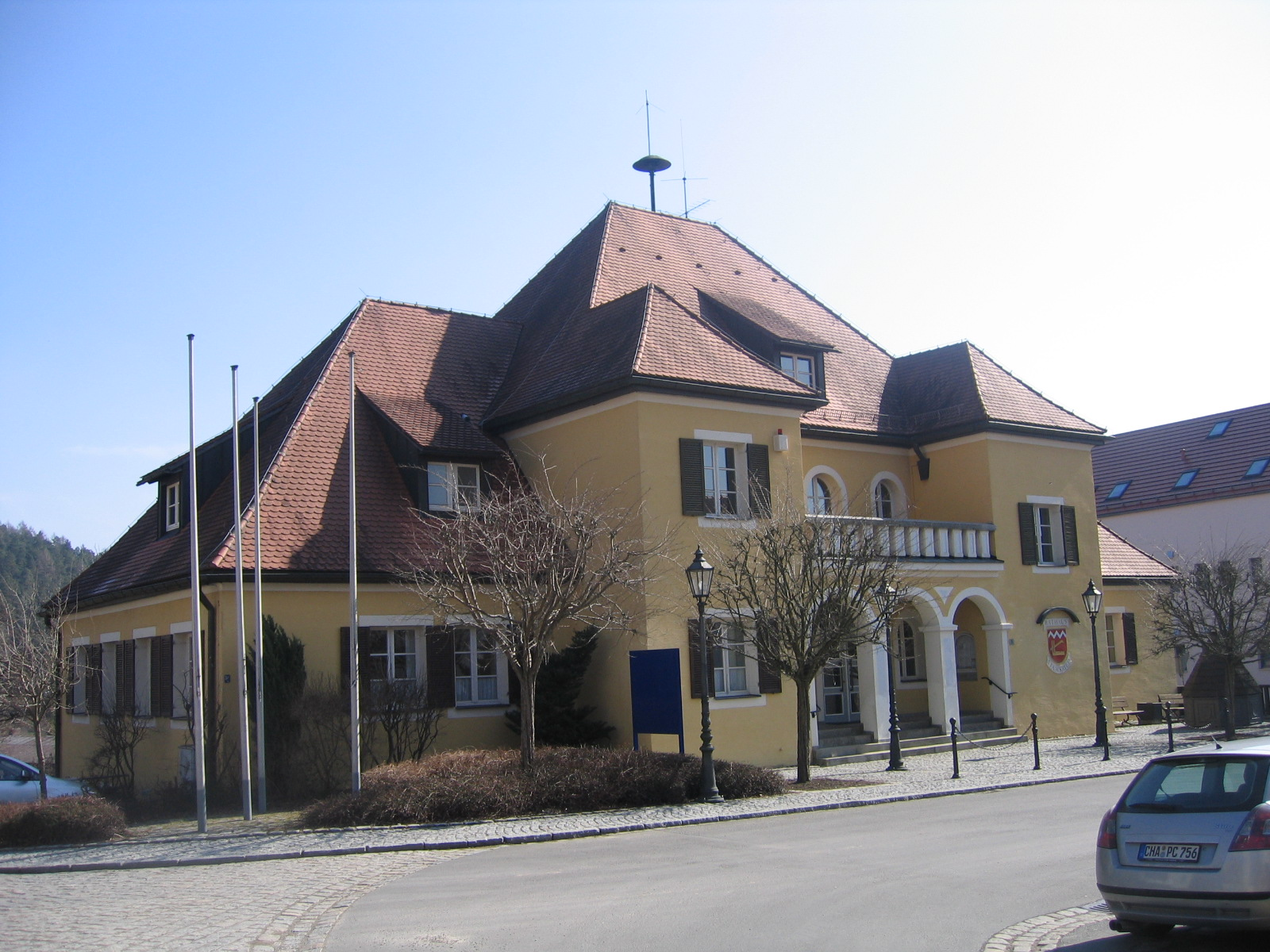
- Town hall

- Coat of arms

- Location of Stamsried within Cham district
- Interactive map of Stamsried
- Location within Germany Location within Bavaria
- Coordinates: 49°16′N 12°32′E
- Country: Germany
- State: Bavaria
- Admin. region: Oberpfalz
- District: Cham
- Municipal assoc.: Stamsried

Government
  - Mayor (2020–26): Herbert Bauer (CSU)

Area
  - Total: 43.44 km^{2} (16.77 sq mi)
- Elevation: 453 m (1,486 ft)

Population (2025-12-31)
  - Total: 2,219
  - Density: 51.08/km^{2} (132.3/sq mi)
- Time zone: UTC+01:00 (CET)
  - Summer (DST): UTC+02:00 (CEST)
- Postal codes: 93491
- Dialling codes: 0 94 66
- Vehicle registration: CHA
- Website: www.stamsried.de

Stamsried is a village and municipality in the district of Cham in the Upper Palatinate region of Bavaria, Germany, near the Czech border. It is also located in the Roman Catholic diocese of Regensburg. Stamsried has a population of 2,319 as of June 2004 and an area of 4,343 hectares (43.43 square kilometers; 16.77 square miles) which includes surrounding countryside outside the built up area of the village itself, the population density is 53.4 persons per square kilometer (138 persons/mi^{2}). Stamsried is located 456 meters (1,496 feet) above sea level and contains rolling hills as high as 600 meters (2,000 feet).

Stamsried is located near the Upper Bavarian Forest Nature Park and therefore tourism makes up a portion of its economy as shown by the number of small hotels and "pensions" or bed and breakfasts. Sites of interest within Stamsried itself include the Catholic parish church of St. John the Baptist built in 1719. Near the church there is a square with the Mariensäule or Marian column erected in 1729 and four other statues of saints erected in 1735 (St. Florian, St. Sebastian, John the Baptist and John of Nepomuk).

== History ==
In the 9th century the Marcomanni were the first settlers in the region. The earliest historical mention of Stamsried dates back to the year 1140, due to a tournament of 63 knights. 1346 Dietrich II of Kürn is mentioned as owner of Stamsried. He built the Kürnburg castle in 1354 and for most of its history it has maintained a low-key rural Bavarian culture relatively isolated from political situations in the larger world. The Bavarian statesman Karl von Abel retired and lived until his death in 1859 on his tenure manor in Stamsried. After the death of Ludwig von Abel the village became property of the kingdom of Bavaria. In the two world wars Stamsried was taken over by allied powers without a single shot being fired or any major resistance, in particular at the end of World War II American tanks entered the village square and were welcomed peaceably with a white flag. In recent times Stamsried and the entire surrounding areas has been a stronghold of the conservative Bavarian political party, the Christian Social Union, of which the current mayor Alfred Long is a member.

== Kürnburg ==
The ruin is located on a hill 600 metres (1,969 ft) above sea level near Stamsried. With the allowance of count palatine Ruprecht II, Dietrich II of Kürn built a castle on the top of the Heitberg in 1354. Due to heritage the castle changed ownership in 1406 to Hermann the Hertenberger; in 1425 to Gabein the Freudenberger; then the Wartenberger family in 1429; and finally to the Füchse of Winklarn in 1590. In 1561 the castle and the village became separated properties. During the Thirty Years' War, on 11 January 1634, Swedish troops under duke Bernhard of Saxe-Weimar destroyed the castle. In the 1970s the ruin was restored.
