= Lazarus Bendavid =

German mathematician and philosopher

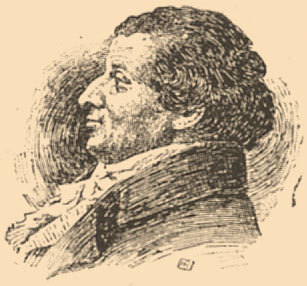
Lazarus Bendavid

Lazarus Bendavid (18 October 1762, in Berlin – 28 March 1832, in Berlin) was a German mathematician and philosopher known for his exposition of Kantian philosophy.

== Biography ==
Bendavid was a Jewish Kantian philosopher.

His father was David Lazarus of Braunschweig, his mother Eva Hirsch of Berlin, daughter of Hirsch David, the first velvet-manufacturer in the Prussian states. Both parents had a "liberal upbringing" and wrote Hebrew and German correctly, spoke French; the father had a significant education in the French classics.

After his graduation from the University of Berlin he lectured for some years on the philosophy of Kant in Vienna. His lectures being discouraged by the Austrian government during a general purge of foreigners, Bendavid returned to Berlin, where he found government employment and continued to lecture and write.

Ben David was critical of Jewish messianism and, comparing kabbalah with Jewish rationalism, argued that the concept of the messiah was an imaginary human invention.

== Works ==
- Uber die Parallellinien (On parallel lines; Berlin, 1786)
- Versuch einer logischen Auseinandersetzung des mathematisch-unendlichen (Treatise on the logical explanation of the mathematical concept of infinity; Berlin 1796)
- Versuch über das Vergnügen (Treatise on pleasure; 2 vols., Vienna 1794)
- Vorlesungen über die Kritik der reinen Vernunft (Lectures on the criticism of pure reason; Vienna, 1795)
- Vorlesungen über die Kritik der praktischen Vernunft (Lectures on the criticism of practical reason; Vienna, 1796)
- Vorlesungen über die Kritik der Urteilskraft (Lectures on the criticism of the power of judgment; Vienna, 1796)
- Rede über den Zweck der Kritischen Philosophie (Talk on the goal of critical philosophy; Vienna, 1796)
- Selbstbiographie (Autobiography; Berlin, 1804)
