= Heinrich Wöhlk =

German optometrist

- Born: 9 April 1913; Kiel, Schleswig-Holstein, Germany
- Died: 23 December 1991 (aged 78)
- Occupation: Optometrist

Heinrich Wöhlk (9 April 1913 – 23 December 1991 in Schönkirchen) was a German optometrist.

== Life ==
In 1940, German optometrist Heinrich Wöhlk invented plastic Contact lenses, based on his experiments performed during the 1930s. In 1951, he started his own company.
