= 1835 in Germany =

- Decades: 1810s; 1820s; 1830s; 1840s; 1850s
- See also: Other events of 1835; History of Germany • Timeline • Years

Events from the year 1835 in Germany

== Incumbents ==
- Kingdom of Prussia
  - Monarch – Frederick William III (16 November 1797 – 7 June 1840)
- Kingdom of Bavaria
  - Monarch - Ludwig I (1825–1848)
- Kingdom of Saxony
  - Anthony (5 May 1827 – 6 June 1836)
- Kingdom of Hanover
  - William IV (26 June 1830 to 1837)
- Kingdom of Württemberg
  - William (1816–1864)

== Events ==
- 3 October – The Staedtler Company (pencil manufacturers) is founded by J. S. Staedtler in Nuremberg, Germany.
- November/December – The German Federal Convention prohibits circulation of work by members of the "Young Germany" group of writers (Karl Gutzkow, Heinrich Heine, Heinrich Laube, Theodor Mundt and Ludolf Wienbarg) and the exiled poet Heinrich Heine.
- 7 December – The Bavarian Ludwig Railway opens between Nuremberg and Fürth, with a train hauled by the British-built Der Adler ("The Eagle"), the first railway in Germany.
- unknown dates
  - David Strauss begins publication of Das Leben Jessu, kritisch bearbeitet ("The life of Jesus, critically examined") in Tübingen.
  - Cell division is first observed under the microscope by German botanist Hugo von Mohl as he works over green algae Cladophora glomerata.

== Births ==
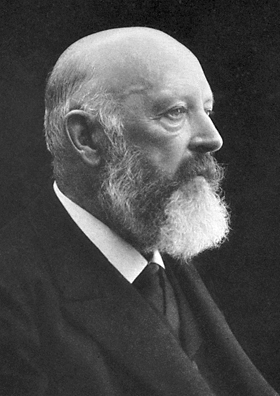
Adolf von Baeyer

- 24 June – Johannes Wislicenus, German chemist (d. 1902)
- 7 October – Felix Draeseke, German composer (d. 1913)
- 31 October – Adolf von Baeyer, German chemist, Nobel Prize laureate (d. 1917)
- 6 December – Wilhelm Rudolph Fittig, German chemist (d. 1910)

== Deaths ==
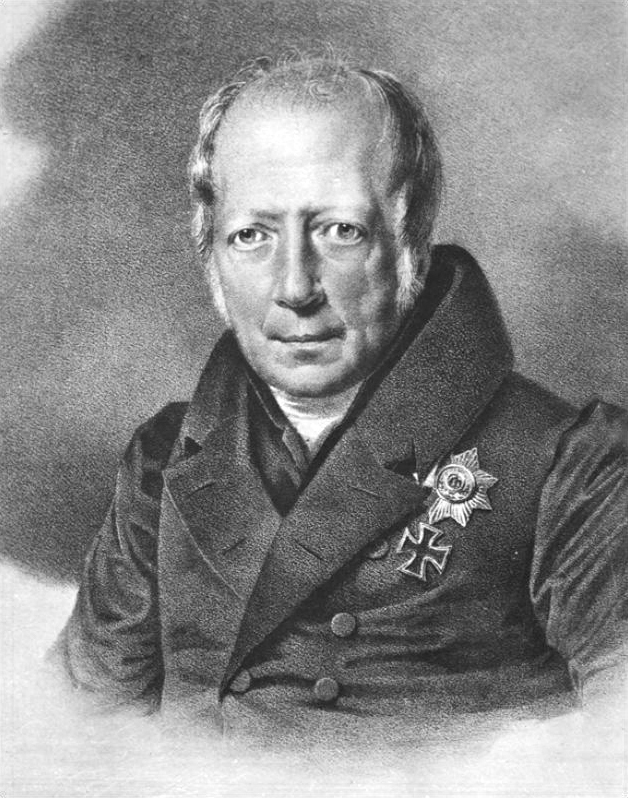
Wilhelm von Humboldt

- 18 March – Christian Günther von Bernstorff, Danish, Prussian statesman, diplomat (b. 1769)
- 4 April – Friedrich August von Klinkowström, German artist, author and teacher (born 1778)
- 8 April – Wilhelm von Humboldt, German linguist, philosopher (b. 1767)
- 18 August – Friedrich Stromeyer, German chemist (born 1776)
- 20 August – Friedrich Rehberg, German portrait and historical painter (born 1758)
- 20 November – Joseph von Baader, German railway pioneer (b. 1763)
- 29 November – Princess Catharina of Württemberg, wife of Jérôme Bonaparte (b. 1783)
