= 1834 in Germany =

- Decades: 1810s; 1820s; 1830s; 1840s; 1850s
- See also: Other events of 1834; History of Germany • Timeline • Years

Events from the year 1834 in Germany

== Incumbents ==
- Kingdom of Prussia
  - Monarch – Frederick William III (16 November 1797 – 7 June 1840)
- Kingdom of Bavaria
  - Monarch - Ludwig I (1825–1848)
- Kingdom of Saxony
  - Anthony (5 May 1827 – 6 June 1836)
- Kingdom of Hanover
  - William IV (26 June 1830 to 1837)
- Kingdom of Württemberg
  - William (1816–1864)

== Events ==
- 1 January – Zollverein (Germany): Customs charges are abolished at borders within its member states.
- 12 November – The Landgraviate of Hesse-Rotenburg loses its independence when the estates not bequeathed to princes Victor and Chlodwig of Hohenlohe-Waldenburg-Schillingsfürst are reunited with Hesse-Kassel.
- 3 December – The Zollverein institutes the first regular census in Germany. The population is 23,478,120.

== Publications ==
- Heinrich Heine – Zur Geschichte der Religion und Philosophie in Deutschland (The History of Religion and Philosophy in Germany)

== Births ==
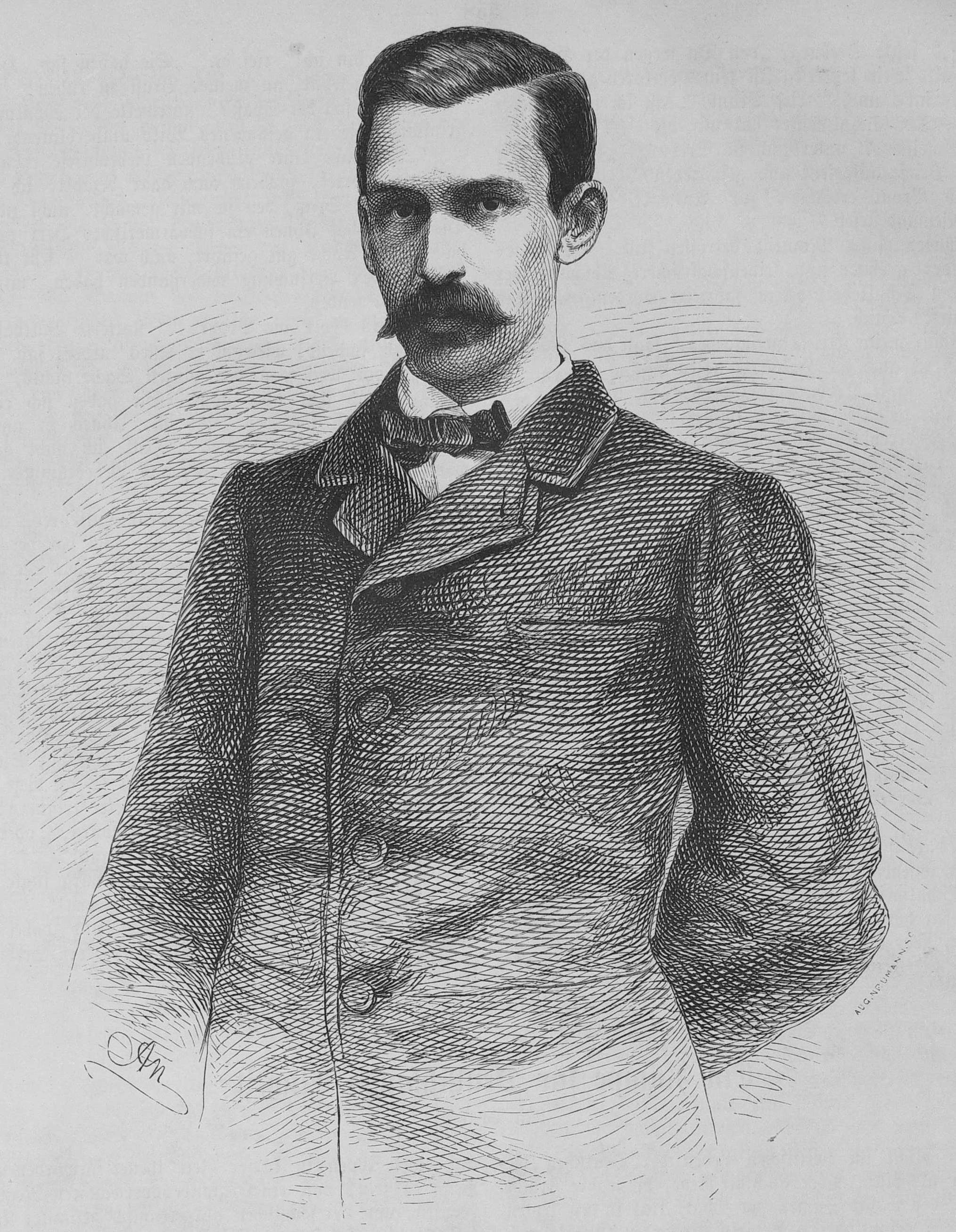
Heinrich von Treitschke

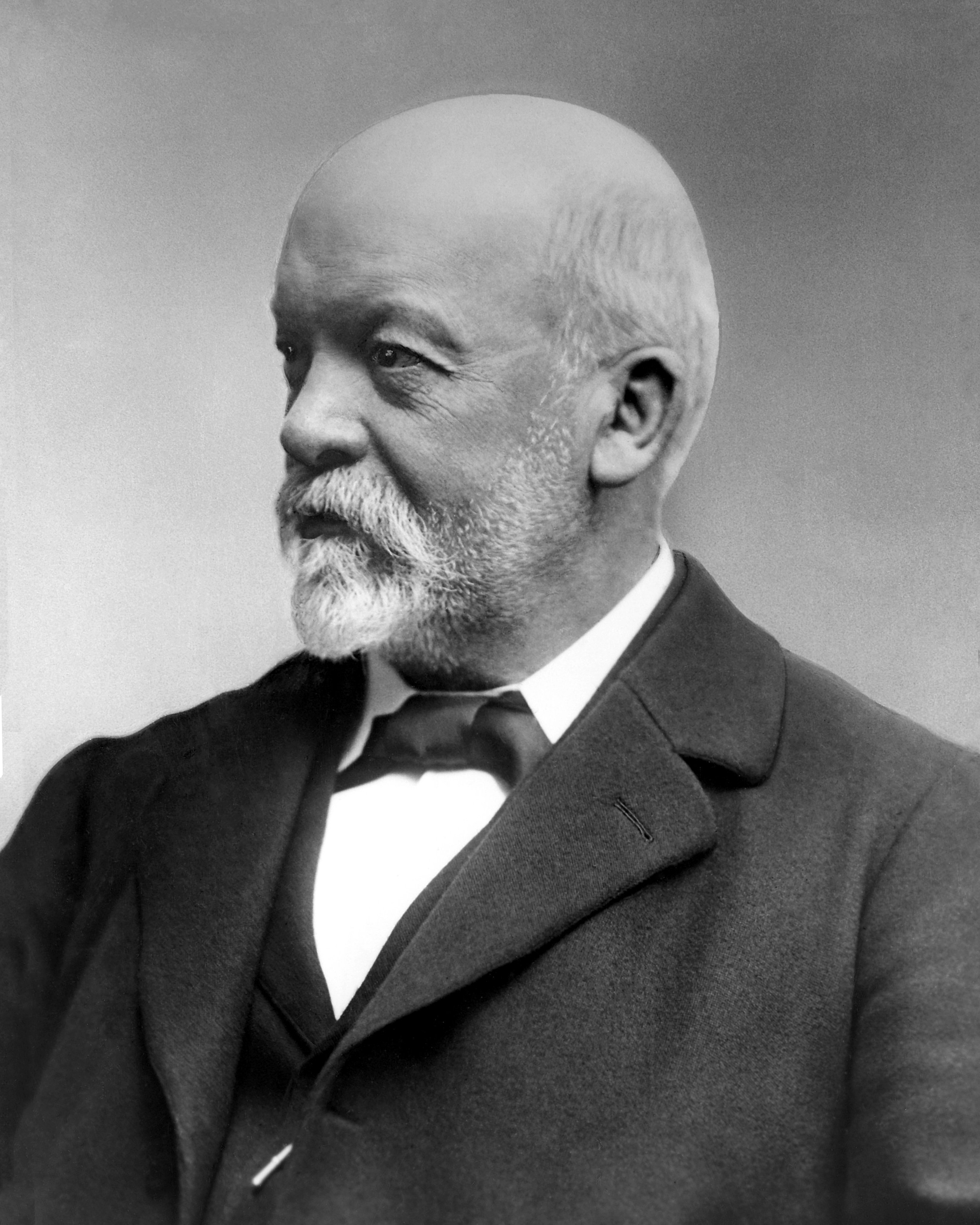
Gottlieb Daimler.

- 7 January – Johann Philipp Reis, German physicist, inventor (d. 1874)
- 17 January – August Weismann, German evolutionary biologist (d. 1914)
- 6 February – Edwin Klebs, German-Swiss pathologist who discovered Diphtheria (d. 1913)
- 9 February – Felix Dahn, German author (d. 1912)
- 16 February – Ernst Haeckel, German zoologist, philosopher (d. 1919)
- 17 March – Gottlieb Daimler, German engineer, inventor (d. 1900)
- 23 March – Julius Reubke, German composer (d. 1858)
- 9 May – Alexander Calandrelli, German sculptor (died 1903)
- 20 May – Albert Niemann, German chemist (d. 1861)
- 5 August – Ewald Hering (died 1918), German physiologist.
- 29 August – Hermann Sprengel (died 1906), German-born chemist.
- 15 September – Heinrich von Treitschke, German historian (died 1896)
- 30 September – Carl Schorlemmer (died 1892), German organic chemist.
- 8 November – Johann Karl Friedrich Zöllner, German astrophysicist (d. 1882)
- 19 November – Georg Hermann Quincke, German physicist (d. 1924)
- 9 December – Leopold Müller, German-born Austrian painter (died 1892)

== Deaths ==
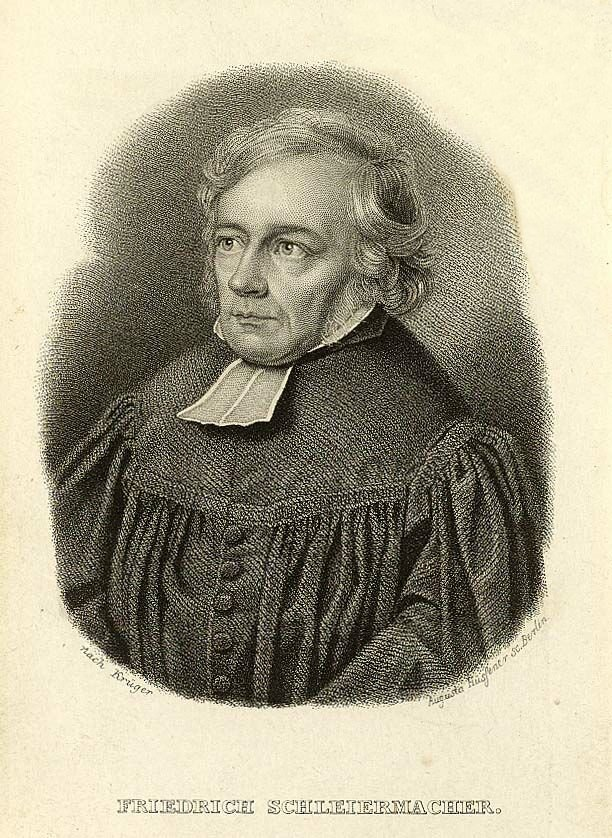
Friedrich Schleiermacher

- 12 February – Friedrich Schleiermacher, German theologian and philosopher (b. 1768)
- 23 February – Karl Ludwig von Knebel, German poet (b. 1744)
- 26 February – Alois Senefelder, German actor, playwright and inventor of lithography (born 1771)
- 30 March – Rudolph Ackermann, Anglo-German entrepreneur (b. 1764)
- 31 March – Landolin Ohmacht, German sculptor (born 1760)
- 8 September – Gustav Schübler, German naturalist (born 1787)
- 3 December – Ferdinand Runk, German-Austrian landscape painter, draftsman and etcher (born 1764)
- 6 December – Ludwig Adolf Wilhelm von Lützow, Prussian general (born 1782)
- 7 December – Ludwig Schuncke, composer (born 1810)
