= 1833 in Germany =

- Decades: 1810s; 1820s; 1830s; 1840s; 1850s
- See also: Other events of 1833; History of Germany • Timeline • Years

Events from the year 1833 in Germany

== Incumbents ==
- Kingdom of Prussia
  - Monarch – Frederick William III (16 November 1797 – 7 June 1840)
- Kingdom of Bavaria
  - Monarch - Ludwig I (1825–1848)
- Kingdom of Saxony
  - Anthony (5 May 1827 – 6 June 1836)
- Kingdom of Hanover
  - William IV (26 June 1830 to 1837)
- Kingdom of Württemberg
  - William (1816–1864)

== Events ==
- 6 February – His Royal Highness Prince Otto Friedrich Ludwig of Bavaria assumes the title His Majesty Othon the First, by the Grace of God, King of Greece, Prince of Bavaria.
- 6 May – Carl Friedrich Gauss and Wilhelm Weber obtain permission to build an electromagnetic telegraph in Göttingen.
- 14 December – Kaspar Hauser, a mysterious German youth, is stabbed, dying three days later on 17 December.

=== Date unknown ===
- The dawn of biochemistry: The first enzyme, diastase, is discovered by Anselme Payen.

== Births ==
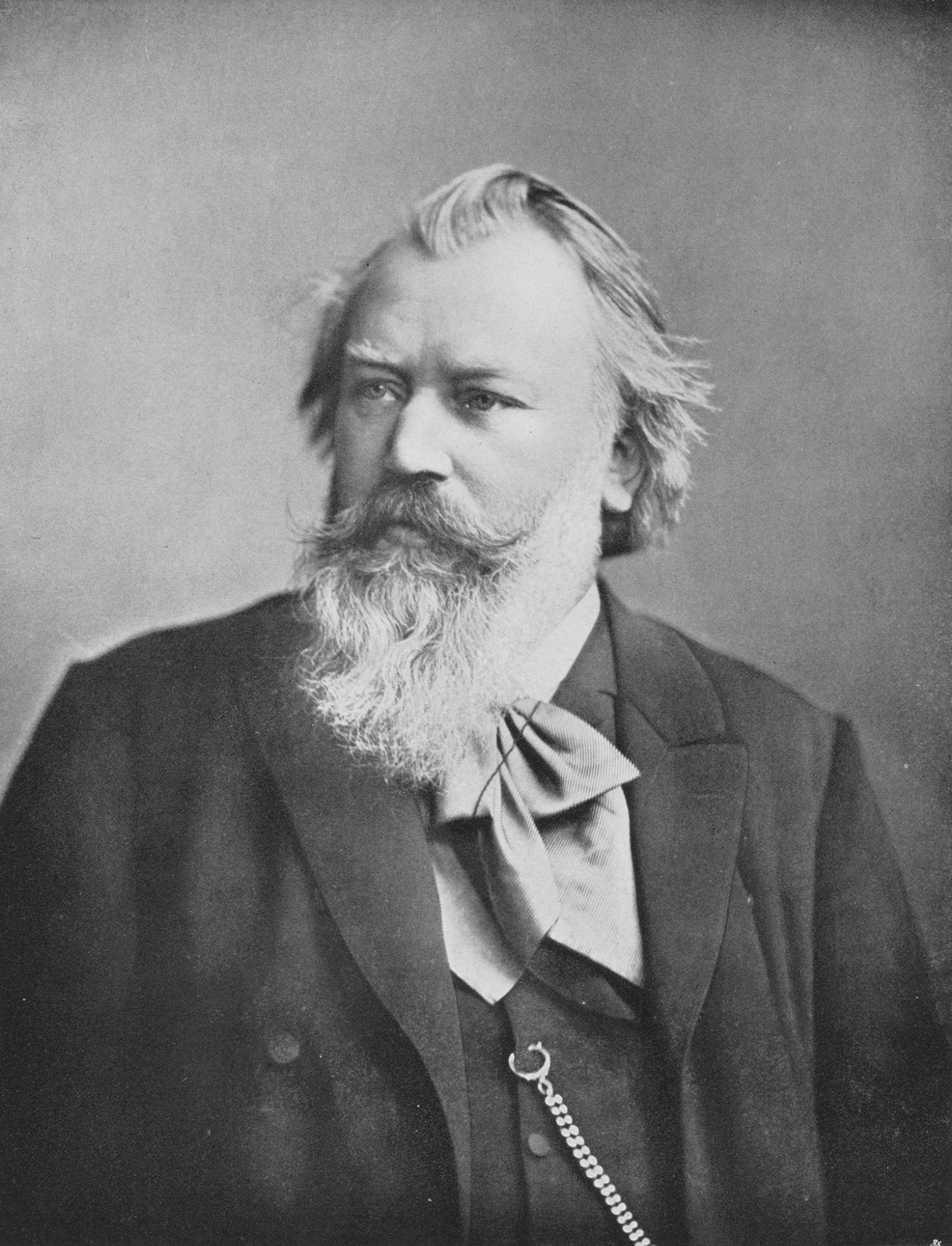
Johannes Brahms

- 5 January – Eugene W. Hilgard, German-American "Father of soil science" (d. 1916)
- 28 February – Alfred von Schlieffen, German field marshal (d. 1913)
- 5 May – Lazarus Fuchs, German mathematician (d. 1902)
- 7 May – Johannes Brahms, German composer (d. 1897)

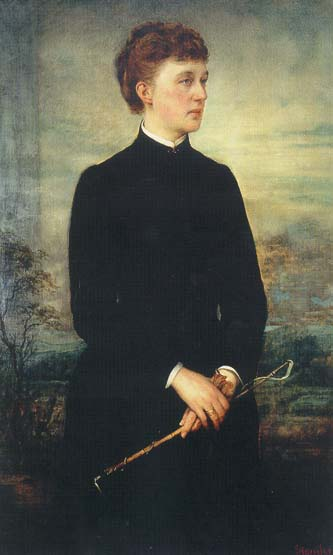
Princess Adelheid-Marie of Anhalt-Dessau

- 3 August – Auguste Schmidt, German educator, women's rights activist (d. 1902)
- 25 December – Princess Adelheid-Marie of Anhalt-Dessau (d. 1916)

== Deaths ==
- 16 January – Nannette Streicher, German piano maker, composer, music educator, and writer (b. 1769)
- 16 October – Meno Haas, German-born copperplate engraver (b. 1752)
- 17 December – Kaspar Hauser, German youth of uncertain origin (stabbed) (b. 1812?)
