= Carl von Perbandt =

German painter

- Born: Carl Adolf Rudolf Julius von Perbandt; 12 May 1832; Langendorf, East Prussia
- Died: 6 April 1911 (aged 78); Nahmgeist, East Prussia
- Occupation: Landscape painter
- Relatives: Lina von Perbandt (sister)

Carl von Perbandt (12 May 1832 – 6 April 1911) was a German landscape painter and member of the Düsseldorf school of painting. He travelled to the United States in 1870 and spent most of his career in Northern California where he lived from 1876 until 1903. Many of his paintings were destroyed in the 1906 San Francisco earthquake. However, the Oakland Museum and the Crocker Art Museum hold two of his landscapes and several more are held in private collections.

== Life and career ==
Perbandt was born into an aristocratic German-speaking family in Langendorf, East Prussia. He studied painting under Andreas Achenbach and Carl Friedrich Lessing at the Düsseldorf Academy, although his determination to become an artist and his refusal to pursue a military career displeased his family. In 1859 he married Maria Treusch von Buttlar-Brandenfels. The couple had two sons, Conradin and Martin. After he served in the Franco-Prussian War in 1870, Perbandt and his family went to live on his brother's estate in Falkenhorst, East Prussia. Shortly thereafter he left Prussia "under a cloud", leaving his wife and children behind. He went first to the east coast of the United States where he was based in New York City and is known to have produced landscape paintings of scenes in New Jersey, Vermont, and Ulster County, New York.

In 1876 Perbandt moved to Northern California. He travelled and painted with Jules Tavernier in Monterey and eventually settled in San Francisco in 1877 where at times he shared a studio with Henry Raschen (1854-1937). Raschen was born in Prussia but had emigrated with his family to California when he was a boy. Perbandt and Raschen also travelled together "living the bohemian life" and painting scenes in Northern California, particularly Sonoma, Humboldt, and Mendocino counties. For a while, they lived in Fort Ross among the Pomo Indians and shared a studio there.

In his later years in San Francisco he continued to produce panoramic views of the city and the Golden Gate. After Perbandt's wife died in 1903, he returned to Prussia and lived there until his death in 1911. Many of the paintings he left behind in San Francisco were lost in the 1906 earthquake. Perbandt's younger sister, Lina von Perbandt (1836–1884) was also a landscape painter.

== Gallery ==
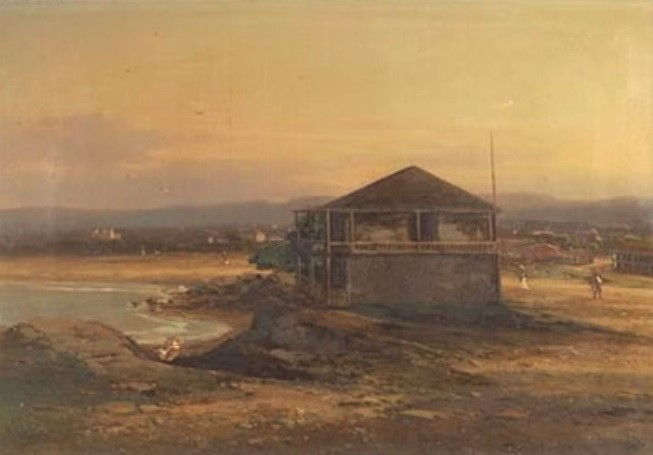
Monterey Custom House 1879

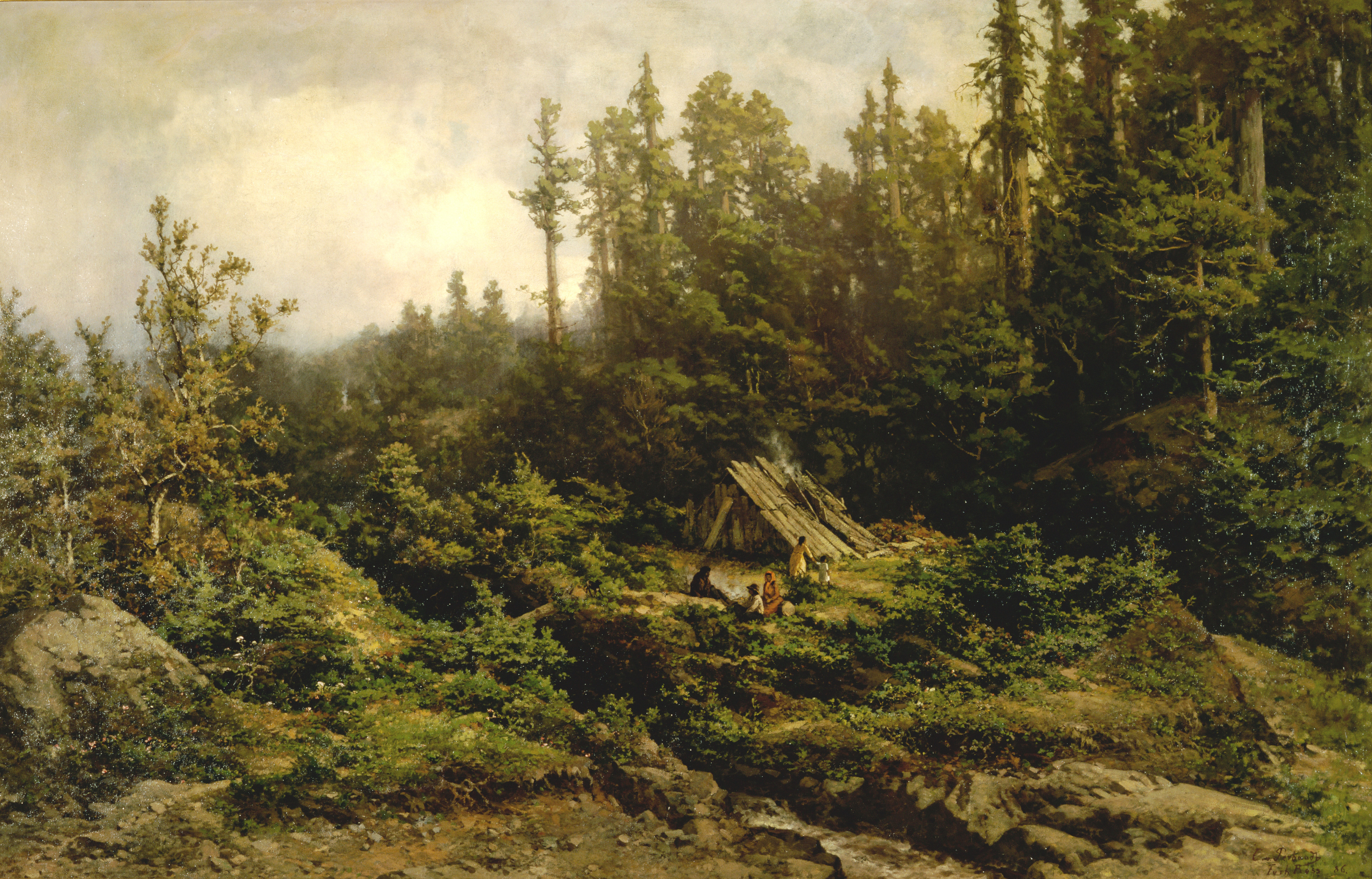
Pomo Indians Camped at Fort Ross 1886
