= Lina von Perbandt =

German painter

- Born: 25 May 1836; Langendorf, Province of Prussia
- Died: 1884
- Occupation: Landscape painter
- Relatives: Carl von Perbandt (brother)

Lina von Perbandt (25 May 1836 – 1884) was a German landscape painter and member of the Düsseldorf school of painting

== Life and career ==
Born into an aristocratic family in Langendorf, East Prussia, Perbandt studied art under August Behrendsen at the Kunstakademie Königsberg and Eugen Dücker at the Kunstakademie Düsseldorf. Her parents were Ida Sophie Ernestine von der Groeben and her husband Otto Friedrich Julius von Perbandt. Her sisters were Ottilie Sophie Friederike Rosette and Ida Karoline Cäcilie Marie. Her brothers were Georg Friedrich Otto Karl, Fedor Karl Otto Gustav, a writer, Rudolf Otto Theodor Traugott, and Karl Adolf Rudolf Julius, also a landscape painter and a student at the Kunstakademie Düsseldorf.

Perbandt lived most of her life in Düsseldorf but travelled and painted widely in Germany and Switzerland. Her landscapes where mostly of low-land scenes, although she also painted some scenes in the Bernese Alps and Harz Mountains. She exhibited at the 1880 Melbourne International Exhibition, where her German Landscape was bought by John Twycross, and at the 1883 International Colonial and Export Exhibition in Amsterdam where her Landscape with Figures was shown in the German pavilion.

== Gallery ==
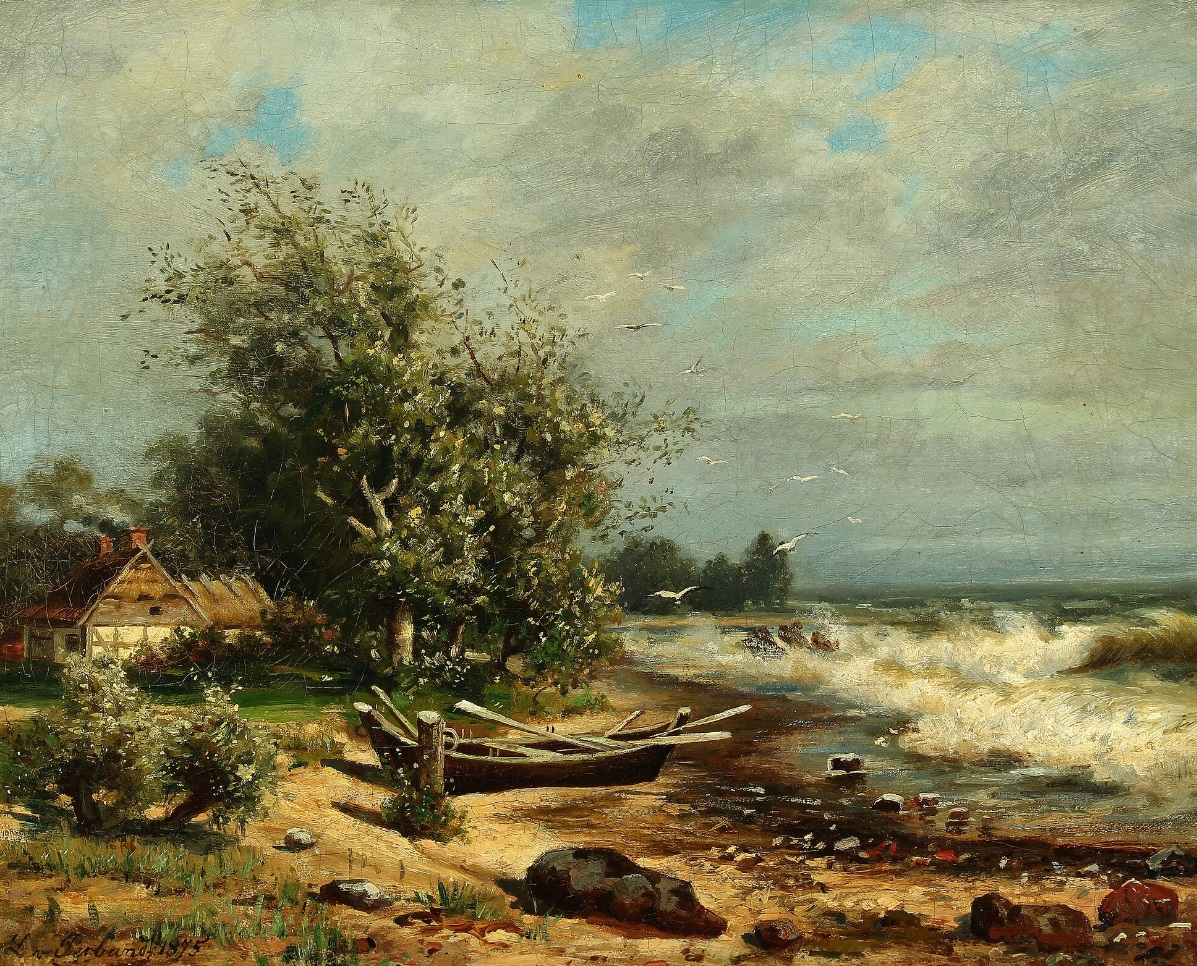
Beach Scene 1875

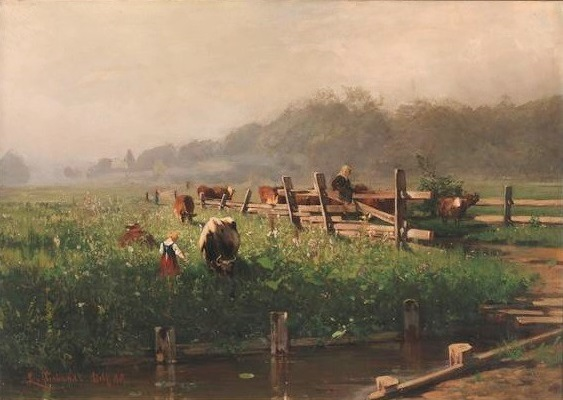
German Landscape 1880
