= Heinrich Bellermann =

Johann Gottfried Heinrich Bellermann (10 March 1832 – 10 April 1903) was a German music theorist. He was the author of Der Contrapunkt ("Counterpoint"), 1862, (Berlin, Verlag von Julius Springer—2nd ed., 1877; 3rd ed., 1887; 4th ed., 1901), and Die Grösse der musikalischen Intervalle als Grundlage der Harmonie ("The size of musical intervals as the foundation of harmony"), 1873 (Berlin, J. Springer).

Bellermann may be regarded as an influence on the Second Viennese School, as his Counterpoint was used by Arnold Schoenberg when teaching composition to pupils such as Alban Berg and Anton Webern.

== Works (selection) ==
In addition to his theoretical work, Bellermann was also an active composer, especially for voices.

- Motette, Psalm 90
- Christus der Erretter, Oratorium
- Drei Passionsmotetten for SATB a cappella
- Dreistimmige Fugen
- Lenzenslust, song, op. 19.3., 1854
- Frühlingslied, op. 19.5., 1867
- Auf dem Wasser, song, op. 19.6., 1854
- Lob der Vögelein, song, op. 19.7., 1857
- Wanderers Nachtlied, op. 19.9., 1856
- Erinnerung, song, op. 19.10., 1869
- Der frohe Wandersmann, song, op. 28.2., 1865
- Nun bricht aus allen Zweigen, song, op. 28.3. (d. 25 April 1871)
- Morgenlied, op. 28.5., 1880
- Wanderlied, op. 28.6. (9.4.12.1879)
- Der Pumpbrunnen, song, 28.7., (1851. Improved in May 1880 )
- Zu Grells Geburtstage, op. 28.8, 1880
- Abendlied, op. 28.9., 1878
- Frühlingslied, 8 voices, op. 28.10., 1879
- Abendstille, song, op. 31.2, 1882
- Frühlingslied, op. 31.2, 1882
- Zigeunerlied, op. 31.7., 3.28.8.1880
- An die Mark, song, op. 41.1., 1884
- Himmelfahrt, song, 41.2., 6 December 1883
- Die frühen Gräber, song, op. 41.3., 1883. Opening bars changed in Feb. 1891
- Frühlingslied, op. 41.4., 1889
- Auf dem See, song, op. 41,5., (8 September 1889)
