= Karl Binz =

German physician and pharmacologist

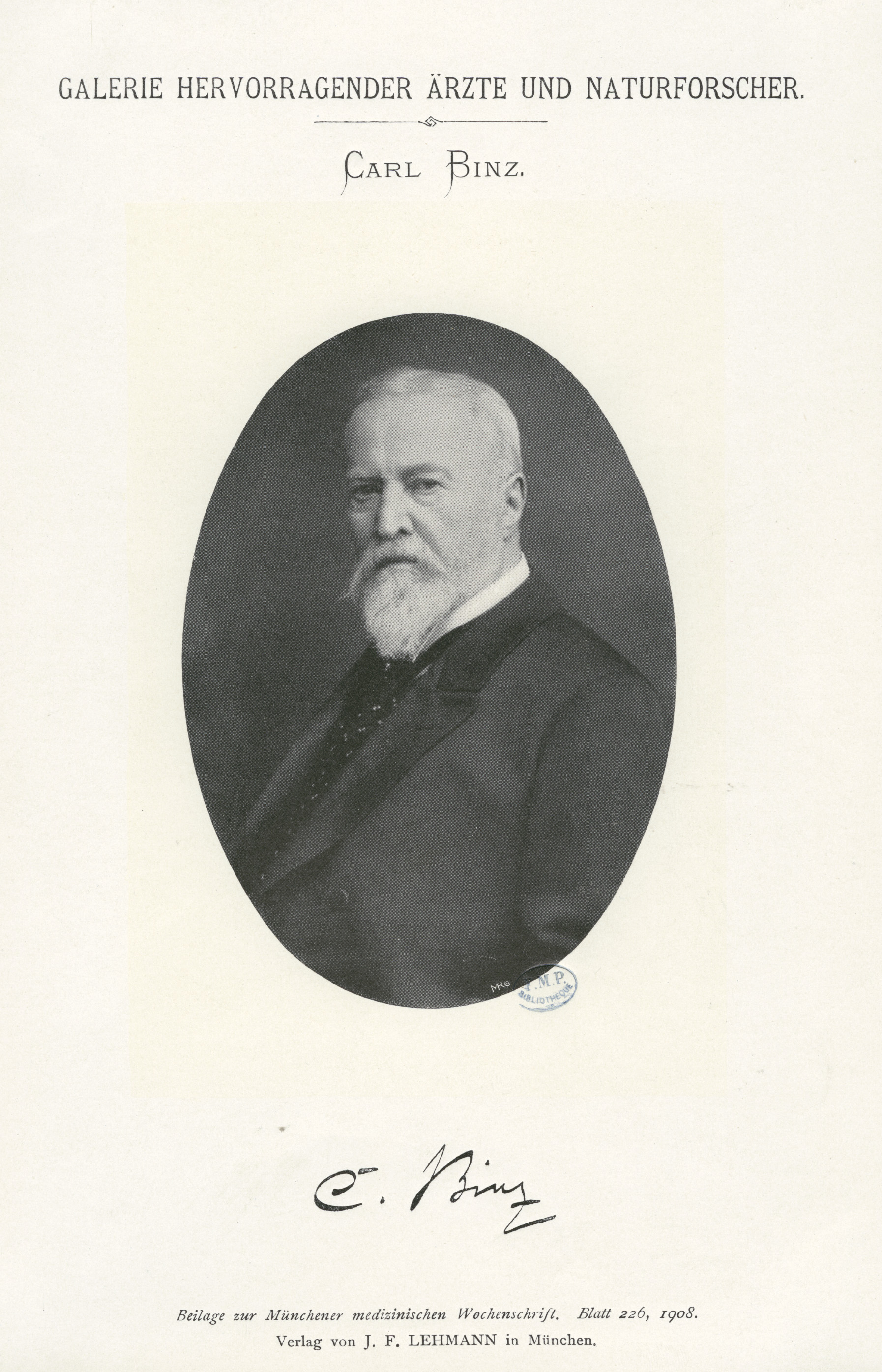
Karl Binz

Karl Binz (1 July 1832 – 11 January 1913) was a German physician and pharmacologist born in Bernkastel. He is known for his investigations on the pharmacological properties and effects of quinine.

He studied at the Universities of Würzburg and Bonn, later working at the University of Berlin in the pathological institute of Rudolf Virchow (1821–1902) and at the clinic of Friedrich Theodor von Frerichs (1819–1885). In 1868 he became an associate professor at Bonn, and several years later founded its pharmacological institute (1873). In 1885/86 he was university rector. During the Austro-Prussian War (1866) and Franco-Prussian War (1870–71) he served as a staff physician.

In 1867 he discovered that quinine was highly toxic to micro-organisms in impure water, and demonstrated that quinine hydrochlorate with neutral or slightly basic reaction was an effective poison for the protoplasms of decomposing plants and impeded many fermenting and putrid processes. In addition to his research of quinine, he performed extensive pharmacological tests on arsenic, halogens and associated compounds, sleep-inducing substances, et al. The eponymous "Binz' test" is a qualitative test for the presence of quinine in urine.

== Selected writings ==
- Ueber die Wirkung antiseptischer Stoffe auf Infusorien von Pflanzenjauche, (Centralblatt der med. Wissenschaften, V/20), 1867 – On the effect of antiseptic substances on infusoria of plant pests.
- Experimentelle Beobachtungen über das Wesen der Chininwirkung, 1868 – Experimental observations on the nature of quinine.
- Weitere Studien über Chinin. (Berliner Klinische Wochenschrift, November 1871), 1871 – Further studies about quinine.
- Das Chinin nach den neueren pharmakologischen Arbeiten, 1876 – Quinine according to recent pharmacological work.
- Ueber den Traum (1878).
- La quinine prophylactique de la fièvre de la malaria (1890, by Binz and other scientists) – Quinine for treatment of the fever of malaria.
- Vorlesungen über Pharmakologie, 1891 – Lessons on pharmacology.
- Rezeptsünden und ihre Folgen (1899).

Binz was also the author of a number of works in the field of "history of medicine", such as:

- Doktor Johann Weyer, ein rheinischer Arzt, der erste Bekämpfer des Hexenwahns, (1885, second edition 1896) – Doctor Johann Weyer, a Rhenish physician, first fighter of the witch craze.
- Augustin Lercheimer (Professor H. Witekind in Heidelberg) und seine Schrift wider den Hexenwahn, 1888 – Augustin Lercheimer (Professor H. Witekind in Heidelberg) and his publications against the witch craze.
- Die Einschleppung der Syphilis in Europa, 1893 – The introduction of syphilis in Europe.
- Aether gegen den Schmerz, 1896 – Ether against the pain.
