= Louis Angely =

German playwright, actor and director

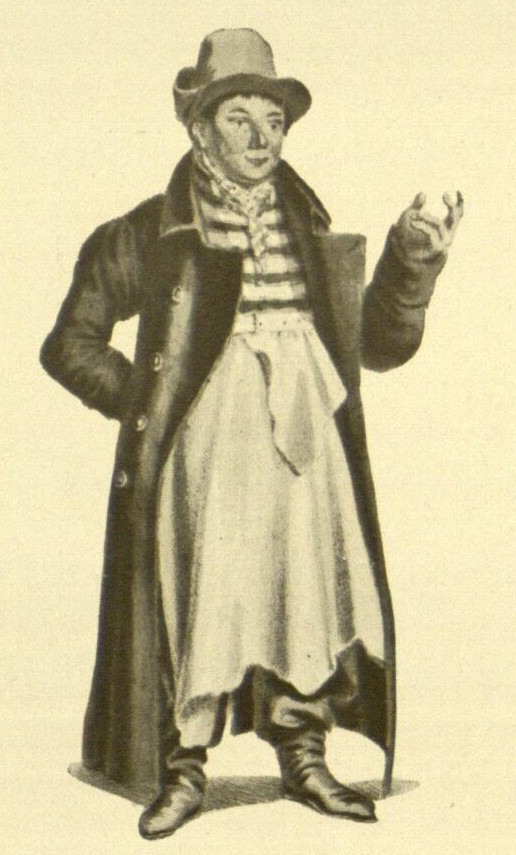
Louis Angely as Foreman Kluck in Das Fest der Handwerker

Louis Jean Jacques Angely (1 February 1787 – 16 November 1835) was a German playwright, actor and director, who wrote Possen (farces) and vaudeville after French models, adapted for German audiences.

Angely was born in Leipzig, the son of Gorges Jean Louis Angely, cantor of the French Reformed Church in Leipzig, and his wife Jeanne Marie. He debuted as an actor in Szczecin in 1808. After working in the Baltic cities of Riga, Tallinn and Jelgava, where he often appeared in comic roles, he went to the Deutsche Hoftheater in St. Petersburg in 1826. After 1828, he worked as an actor-director at the newly established Berlin Königstädter Theater. He retired from the stage In 1830 and bought an inn in Spandauer Strasse in Berlin, while continuing to write plays. His most successful play was the original Berlin Posse Das Fest der Handwerker, in which he himself created the celebrated role of Foreman Kluck.

He died in Berlin and was buried in the cemetery of the French Reformed Church (Französischer Friedhof).

== Works ==
- Die Schneider-Mamsells (Vaudeville, 1 act, Berlin, 1824)
- Thérèse oder die Waise aus Genf (Melodrama, 3 acts, 1824)
- Dover und Calais (Vaudeville, 2 acts, Berlin, 1825)
- Schüler-Schwaenke (Vaudeville-Posse, 1825)
- Sieben Mädchen in Uniform (Vaudeville-Posse, 1 act, 1825)
- Das Fest der Handwerker (komisches Gemälde, 1 act, Berlin, 1828)
- Der hunderjährige Greis (komisches Liederspiel, 1 act, Berlin 1828)
- List und Phlegma (Vaudeville-Posse, 1 act, 1832)
- Prinz Tu-ta-tu (Burleske mit Gesang)
- Paris in Pommern (Vaudeville-Posse, 1 act, 1839)
- Die Reise auf gemeinschaftliche Kosten (komische Gemälde, 5 acts)
- Die Hasen in der Hasenheide (Singspiel, 1 act)
- Die beiden Hofmeister (Vaudeville, 1 act)
- Wohnungen zu vermieten (komisches Gemälde)
- Das Ehepaar aus der alten Zeit (Localer Scherz, 1 act)
- Die Schwestern (Lustspiel, 1 act)
- Der Dachdecker (komische Gemälde)
- Schlafrock und uniform (Lustspiel, 1 act)
- Jugend muß austoben (Lustspiel, 1 act)
- Die Braut aus Pommern (Vaudeville in 1 act)
