= Karl Julius Weber =

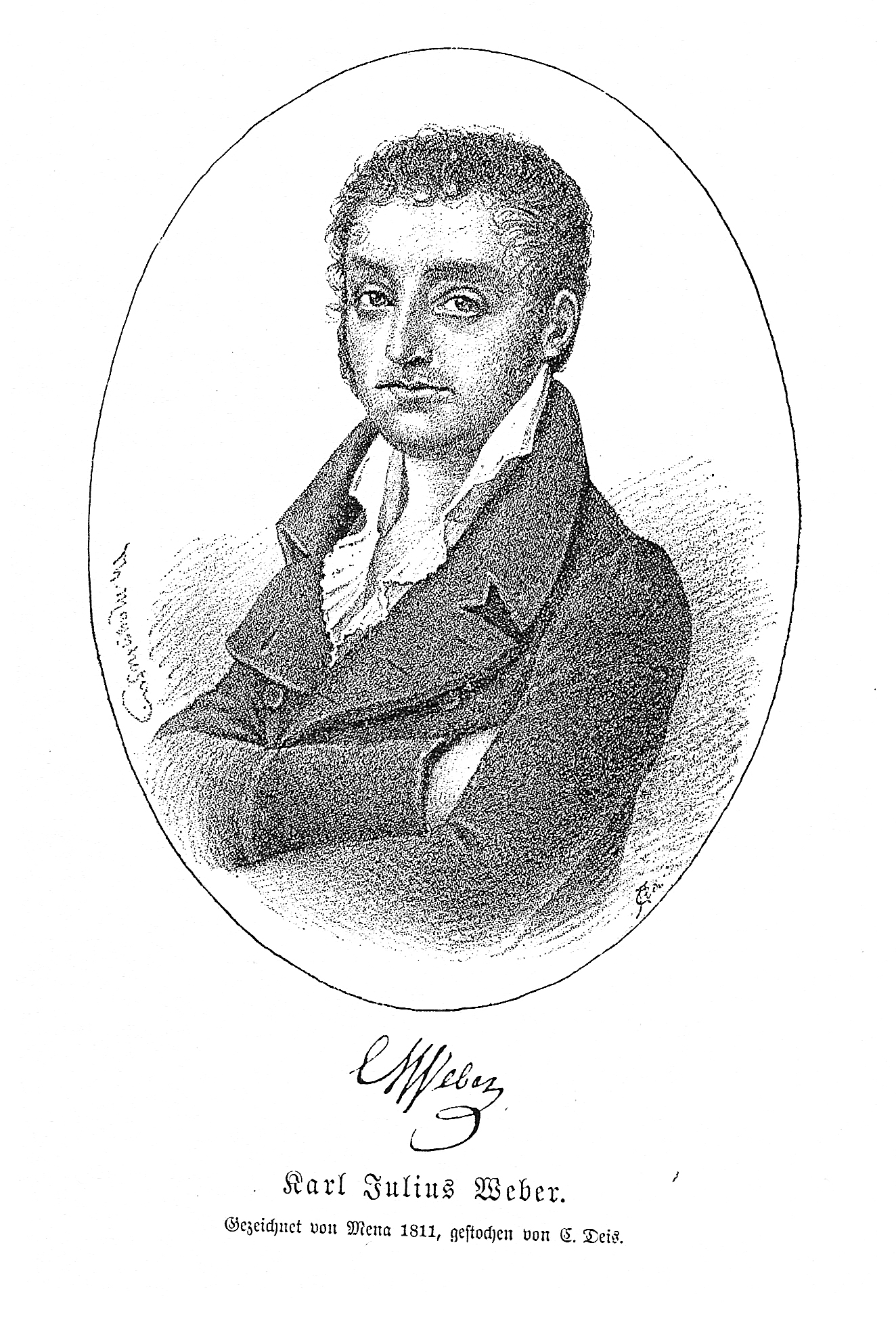

Karl Julius Weber (16 or 20 April 1767, in Langenburg – 19 July 1832, in Kupferzell; also written Carl Julius Weber) was a German short story writer.

== Biography ==
He received his education at Erlangen and Göttingen, and after some time passed in Switzerland, became, in 1792, private secretary to the Count of Erbach-Schönberg, whom he left in 1799 to accept the post of Government councilor at König in Odenwald. Until 1804 he filled various administrative offices, retired then to private life, but from 1820 to 1824 was a member of the popular chamber of the Württemberg Estates.

== Writings ==
Weber is best known for his writings, in which he displays a fresh, original spirit, fine powers of observation, and a talent for witty satire. He was largely influenced by the humanistic teachings of the French literature and philosophy, but his reading was wider than France and his sympathies were cosmopolitan. The most celebrated of his works is Demokritos, oder hinterlassene Papiere eines lachenden Philosophen (Demokritos, or the literary remains of a laughing philosopher, 1832–40). He also wrote Möncherei (Monks, 1818–20), more clever than reliable; Das Ritterwesen (Knights, 1822–24); and Deutschland, oder Briefe eines in Deutschland reisenden Deutschen (Germany, or letters from a German traveling in Germany, 1826–28). His collected works were published at Stuttgart in 1834-45.
