= Carl Hubert von Wendt =

German landowner and politician

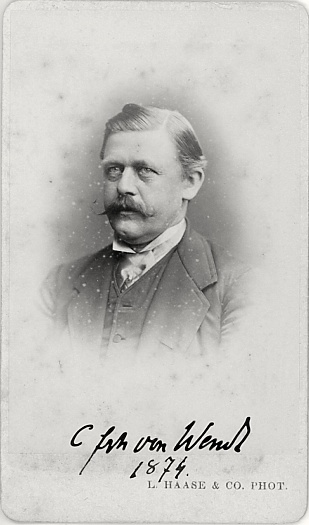
Carl Hubert von Wendt (1832-1903). Photograph by Leopold Haase & Comp., Berlin, around 1874

Carl Hubert Maria Freiherr von Wendt (21 January 1832 – 11 December 1903) was a German landowner and Center Party politician.

== Biography ==
Carl Hubert Maria Freiherr von Wendt attended the Knight Academy in Bedburg. He later studied law in Bonn and Berlin. In 1853, he became a member of the Corps Borussia Bonn. Then, he became government trainee in Münster and government assessor in Arnsberg. He later dedicated himself to managing family property, including the Gevelinghausen Castle.

== Family ==
Carl Hubert Maria Freiherr von Wendt came from the aristocratic Wendt family (from the Papenhausen lineage), and was the son of Franz Freiherr von Wendt (1800-1870) and his first wife Ida Bernhardine Countess von Plettenberg (1806-1834), from the Lenhausen family.
