= John Van der Kiste =

British author (born 1954)

John Van der Kiste (born 15 September 1954 in Wendover, Buckinghamshire) is a British author, historian, librarian, and biographer.

== Education ==
He studied History of Art at A-Level. He studied librarianship at Ealing Technical College and School of Art, where he edited the student magazine.

== Career ==
=== Historical biography and librarianship ===
John Van der Kiste is especially noted for his histories of European royalty, with a particular focus on the extended family of Queen Victoria and related European dynasties.

His first book, Frederick III, appeared in 1981. By the late 1990s, he had published numerous works on royal biography, including studies of Kaiser Wilhelm II and other European figures. During this period, he was working as an academic librarian in Plymouth, England.

Between 1978 and 2017 he was an assistant in the Library and Learning Resources Centre at City College Plymouth, formerly the College of Further Education, where he was commissioned to write a history of the college for internal circulation.

==== Reception ====
Critical reception of John Van der Kiste's work has noted both narrative strengths and analytical limitations. A review in History: Reviews of New Books described him as a "professional British historian" whose work focuses on European royalty, but suggested that his approach can be overly sympathetic, characterizing him as a "royalist historian" whose critical analysis at times lacks conviction.

A 1999 review in Library Journal described his biography of Kaiser Wilhelm II as a "badly needed" work on a subject that had received relatively little attention in the English language, recommending it for undergraduate and public libraries.

In 2002, he was a consultant for the BBC TV documentary The King, the Kaiser and the Tsar, first broadcast in January 2003. He has contributed articles to the BBC History Extra website, and a chapter on William IV to Kings and Queens by Iain Dale (2024).

=== Music ===
In 2015, "I'll Never Walk Away", a song which he co-wrote with Miles Tredinnick under his music business alias Riff Regan, and Steve Voice, appeared on Regan's solo album Milestones. He also played harmonica on 'Cling to Black Leather', a track on The Hell For Leather Mob, released in 2020 by Regan and Voice's band London.

=== Other activities ===
He has also written books and articles on local history, true crime, art and music. He is an author of fiction and a playwright as well. He has reviewed books and records for the press, written CD booklet notes, and between 1991 and 1996 edited and published the 1970s rock fanzine Keep on Rockin. In 2019, he published a book about painting to coincide with an exhibition of eighty of his own paintings: landscapes of his home around Dartmoor.

He has contributed articles to the following publications:

1. Oxford Dictionary of National Biography
2. Guinness Rockopaedia
3. BBC History Magazine,
4. Record Collector
5. llustrated London News,
6. This England,
7. The Independent
8. Gibbons Stamp Monthly

== Publications ==
=== Historical and royal biography ===
- Frederick III, German Emperor 1888 (1981)
- Queen Victoria's Family: A Select Bibliography (1982)
- Dearest Affie: Alfred, Duke of Edinburgh, Queen Victoria's Second Son, 1844-1900 (with Bee Jordaan) (1984)
- Queen Victoria's Children (1986)
- Windsor and Habsburg: The British and Austrian Reigning Houses 1848-1922 (1987)
- Edward VII's Children (1989)
- Princess Victoria Melita, Grand Duchess Cyril of Russia, 1876-1936 (1991)
- George V's Children (1991)
- George III's Children (1992)
- Crowns in a Changing World: The British and European Monarchies 1901-36 (1993)
- Kings of the Hellenes: The Greek Kings 1863-1974 (1994)
- Childhood at court 1819-1914 (1995)
- Northern Crowns: The Kings of Modern Scandinavia (1996)
- King George II and Queen Caroline (1997)
- The Romanovs 1818-1959: Alexander II of Russia and his Family (1998)
- Kaiser Wilhelm II: Germany's Last Emperor (1999)
- The Georgian Princesses (2000)
- Dearest Vicky, Darling Fritz: Queen Victoria's Eldest Daughter and the German Emperor (2001)
- Royal Visits in Devon and Cornwall (2002)
- Once a Grand Duchess: Xenia, Sister of Nicholas II (with Coryne Hall) (2002)
- William and Mary (2003)
- Emperor Francis Joseph: Life, Death and the Fall of the Austro-Hungarian Empire (2005)
- Sons, Servants and Statesmen: The Men in Queen Victoria's Life (2006)
- A Divided Kingdom: The Spanish Monarchy from Isabel to Juan Carlos (2007)
- Jonathan Wild: Conman and Cutpurse (2009)
- William John Wills: Pioneer of the Australian Outback (2011)
- Alfred (2013), revised version of Dearest Affie
- The Prussian Princesses (2014)
- Prince Henry of Prussia (2015)
- Princess Helena: Queen Victoria's Third Daughter (2015)
- The Last German Empress: A Life of Empress Augusta Victoria, Consort of Emperor William II (2015)
- Charlotte and Feodora (2015)
- Dictionary of Royal Biographers (2015)
- The First German Empress: Empress Augusta, Consort of Emperor William I (2016)
- Queen Victoria and the European Empires (2016)
- Daughter of Prussia: Louise, Grand Duchess of Baden, and her Family (2017)
- Of Royalty and Drink (2017)
- The End of the German Monarchy (2017)
- The Dukes of Clarence (2018)
- Sarah Forbes Bonetta: Queen Victoria's African Princess (2018)
- The Dukes of Cumberland (2019)
- The Heroine of Gaeta (2019)
- Hugh Shortland (2019)
- The End of the Habsburg Monarchy (2019)
- George FitzClarence (2020)
- James II and the First Modern Revolution (2021)
- Ena and Bee: Queen Victoria's Spanish granddaughters [edited by] (2022)
- William IV: The Last Hanoverian King of Britain (2022)
- Queen Victoria's Daughters-in-law (2023)
- The Children of Charles II: The Merry Monarch's Fourteen Bastards (2025)

=== Music ===
- Roxeventies: Popular Music in Britain 1970-79 (1982)
- The Roy Wood Story (1986)
- Beyond the Summertime: The Mungo Jerry Story (with Derek Wadeson) (1990)
- Gilbert & Sullivan's Christmas (2000) - anthology
- Roy Wood: The Move, Wizzard and Beyond (2014)
- Jeff Lynne: The Electric Light Orchestra, Before and After (2015)
- Pop Pickers and Music Vendors (2016)
- A Beatles Miscellany (2016)
- We Can Swing Together: The Story of Lindisfarne (2017)
- Electric Light Orchestra: Song by Song (2017)
- While You See a Chance: The Steve Winwood Story (2018)
- Led Zeppelin: Song by Song (2018)
- All Around My Hat: The Steeleye Span Story (2019)
- Kate Bush: Song by Song (2021)
- 1970: A Year in Rock: The Year Rock Became Mainstream (2021)
- Decades: Mott the Hoople and Ian Hunter in the 1970s (2022)
- Decades: Free and Bad Company in the 1970s (2022)
- Decades: Manfred Mann's Earth Band in the 1970s (2023)
- Eagles On Track: Every Song, Every Album (2023)
- Classic Rock: The Rolling Stones, Let it Bleed (2024)
- Everyone's a Winner: The Story of a Punk Band Called London (2025)
- Gerry Rafferty On Track: Every Song, Every Album (2025)
- Mungo Jerry Song-by-Song (with Alan Taylor, Derek Wadeson, Stuart Turner, Mick O'Hanlon) (2025)
- Bon Seger On Track: Every Song, Every Album (2026)

=== Local history/true crime ===
- Devon Murders (2006)
- Devonshire's Own (2007)
- Cornish Murders (with Nicola Sly) (2007)
- Somerset Murders (with Nicola Sly) (2008)
- A Grim Almanac of Devon (2008)
- Cornwall's Own (2008)
- Plymouth: History and Guide (2009)
- West Country Murders (with Nicola Sly) (2009)
- Surrey Murders (2009)
- A Grim Almanac of Cornwall (2009)
- Durham Murders and Misdemeanours (2009)
- Berkshire Murders (2010)
- Ivybridge and South Brent Through Time (with Kim van der Kiste) (2010)
- More Cornish Murders (with Nicola Sly) (2010)
- Dartmoor from Old Photographs (2010)
- More Somerset Murders (with Nicola Sly) (2011)
- A Grim Almanac of Hampshire (2011)
- Plymouth Book of Days (2011)
- More Devon Murders (2011)
- The Little Book of Devon (2011)
- The Little Book of Cornwall (2013)
- Plymouth: A City at War (2014)
- Hugh Shortland (2019)

=== Fiction ===
- The Man on the Moor (2004)
- Olga and David (2014)
- Elmore Sounds (2015)
- Always There (2015)

=== Drama, verse and miscellaneous ===
- The Big Royal Quiz Book (2014)
- The Big Music Quiz Book (2015)
- A Mere Passing Shadow (2015)
- The Man on the Moor (2015) - a dramatisation of his novel
- Dartmoor and other Places: Collected Poems 1975-2015 (2015)
- C.S. Forester's Crime Noir (2018)
- South Brent and Beyond (2019) - paintings
