= Karl von Abel =

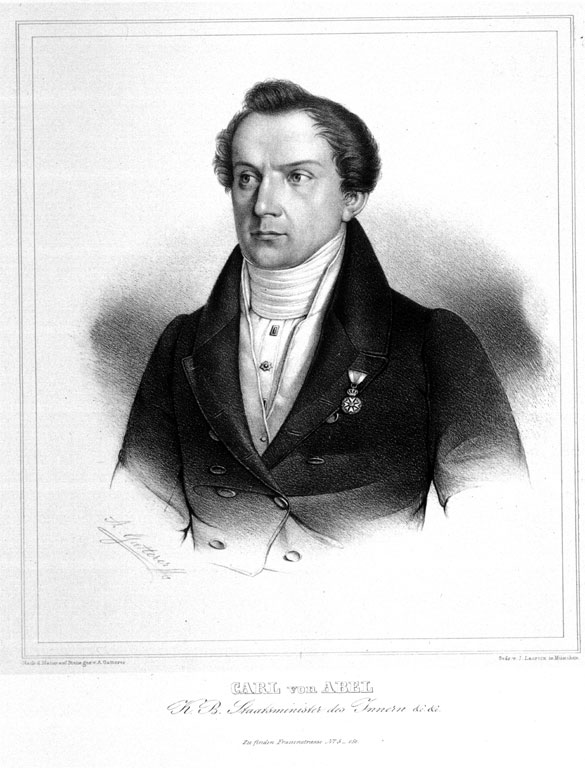
Karl von Abel.

Karl von Abel (September 17, 1788 – September 3, 1859) was a Bavarian statesman.

Born in Wetzlar, Abel was the son of a procurator at the superior Court of Justice. He studied law in Gießen from 1806-1809, and became a civil servant of Bavaria in 1810.

In 1817 he was appointed city and police commissar in Bamberg, in 1819, Governmental Councillor in Munich, and in 1827 promoted to Senior Legal Secretary. In the Diet of 1831 he gave a speech in favour of freedom of the press and against censorship.

In the following year, Abel was assigned by King Ludwig I to be a part of the delegation accompanying the young King Otto to Greece. He joined with Georg Ludwig von Maurer in opposing the head of the delegation, Count Josef Ludwig von Armansperg, who he felt was too susceptible to the wishes of the English diplomats. However, the count was able to mobilise his supporters in Munich and have Abel and Maurer unseated from the delegation. Abel once again became Legal Secretary in the Ministry of the Interior. He married Friederike von Rinecker in 1836, a very religious woman, who had much influence on him.

On 1 November 1837, Abel became Privy Councillor in place of Ludwig, Fürst von Wallerstein and began to lead the Ministry of the Interior. At this time, the Cologne Troubles excited the masses on religious and political levels. Soon enough the Ministry under Abel proved to be strictly Catholic. The status of the clergy was raised and large sums were spent for religious issues. This was followed by several edicts, for example prescribing that Protestant soldiers must also genuflect during a Catholic service. The formation of Evangelic communities and the execution of their services was made complicated and restricted and strict censorship applied to all opposing movements.

In other issues Abel showed his absolutist and ultramontane position. He authorized an edict disallowing the use of all "modern terms, which try to foist the principle of classes with a representative one". As an example, the term of Ministry of the State was forbidden as the king must unite all power in himself. Several affronts against his precursor Wallerstein resulted in a duel which he lost.

Wallerstein lead the opposition forming mainly in the kingdom's newly acquired territories against the paternalism of the Ministry. In the Diet of 1846 he openly fought the existing system. Abel could not avert the claims that he had broken the principle of parity, and that the Christian party was in contact with radical elements. For this the King lost his trust in Abel, and removed him as Ministry of Culture and Education.

Abel was dismissed from power on 17 February 1847 when he and the other ministers opposed the naturalisation of the King's mistress, Lola Montez. Afterwards, he had not only to suffer the disgrace of the king he had served for a long time, but was also repudiated by the members of his own party. In 1848 Abel was voted into the Second Chamber of the Bavarian Parliament, where his former administration was attacked from all sides.

He was appointed as envoy to the Kingdom of Sardinia, but refused to take the charge until the reign of Maximilian II of Bavaria. Abel was recalled as envoy in 1850 and retired from the political life. Until his death in 1859 he lived on his tenure Stamsried manor in Upper Palatinate. He died in Munich.
