= 1819 in Germany =

- Decades: 1800s; 1810s; 1820s; 1830s
- See also: Other events of 1819; History of Germany • Timeline • Years

Events from the year 1819 in Germany.

== Incumbents ==
=== Kingdoms ===
- Kingdom of Prussia
  - Monarch – Frederick William III (16 November 1797 – 7 June 1840)
- Kingdom of Bavaria
  - Maximilian I (1 January 1806 – 13 October 1825)
- Kingdom of Saxony
  - Frederick Augustus I (20 December 1806 – 5 May 1827)
- Kingdom of Hanover
  - George III (25 October 1760 –29 January 1820)
- Kingdom of Württemberg
  - William (30 October 1816 – 25 June 1864)

=== Grand Duchies ===
- Grand Duke of Baden
  - Louis I (8 December 1818 – 30 March 1830)
- Grand Duke of Hesse
  - Louis I (14 August 1806 – 6 April 1830)
- Grand Duke of Mecklenburg-Schwerin
  - Frederick Francis I– (24 April 1785 – 1 February 1837)
- Grand Duke of Mecklenburg-Strelitz
  - George (6 November 1816 – 6 September 1860)
- Grand Duke of Oldenburg
  - Wilhelm (6 July 1785 –2 July 1823 ) Due to mental illness, Wilhelm was duke in name only, with his cousin Peter, Prince-Bishop of Lübeck, acting as regent throughout his entire reign.
  - Peter I (2 July 1823 - 21 May 1829)
- Grand Duke of Saxe-Weimar-Eisenach
  - Charles Frederick (14 June 1828 - 8 July 1853)

=== Principalities ===
- Schaumburg-Lippe
  - George William (13 February 1787 - 1860)
- Schwarzburg-Rudolstadt
  - Friedrich Günther (28 April 1807 - 28 June 1867)
- Schwarzburg-Sondershausen
  - Günther Friedrich Karl I (14 October 1794 - 19 August 1835)
- Principality of Lippe
  - Leopold II (5 November 1802 - 1 January 1851)
- Principality of Reuss-Greiz
  - Heinrich XIX (29 January 1817 - 31 October 1836)
- Waldeck and Pyrmont
  - George II (9 September 1813 - 15 May 1845)

=== Duchies ===
- Duke of Anhalt-Dessau
  - Leopold IV (9 August 1817 - 22 May 1871)
- Duke of Brunswick
  - Charles II (16 June 1815 – 9 September 1830)
- Duke of Saxe-Altenburg
  - Duke of Saxe-Hildburghausen (1780–1826) - Frederick
- Duke of Saxe-Coburg and Gotha
  - Ernest I (9 December 1806 – 12 November 1826)
- Duke of Saxe-Meiningen
  - Bernhard II (24 December 1803–20 September 1866)
- Duke of Schleswig-Holstein-Sonderburg-Beck
  - Frederick William (25 March 1816 – 6 July 1825)

== Events ==
- 23 March – In Mannheim, Duchy of Baden, German dramatist August von Kotzebue is assassinated by Karl Ludwig Sand.
- 1 July – German astronomer Johann Georg Tralles discovers what will be called the Great Comet of 1819
- 20 September – Carlsbad Decrees are issued throughout the German Confederation

== Publications ==
  - E. T. A. Hoffmann
    - The Life and Opinions of the Tomcat Murr
    - Das Fräulein von Scuderi: Erzählung aus dem Zeitalter Ludwig des Vierzehnten (novella published in Taschenbuch für das Jahr 1820)
- Joseph von Eichendorff – Das Marmorbild
- Arthur Schopenhauer – The World as Will and Representation
- Jacob Grimm – Deutsche Grammatik

== Births ==
- 8 January - Mary Frances Schervier, Germane founder of two religious congregations of Religious Sisters of the Third Order Regular of St. Francis, (died 1876)
- 10 January – Karl Heine, German lawyer and entrepreneur (died 1888)
- 8 February – Carl Friedrich Wilhelm Jordan, German writer and politician (died 1904)
- 10 February – Albert Schwegler, German philosopher and Protestant theologian. (died 1857)
- 11 February – Ottilie Assing, German feminist, freethinker, and abolitionist. (died 1884)
- 17 February
  - Philipp Jaffé, German historian and philologist (died 1870)
  - Max Schneckenburger, German writer (died 1849)
- 20 February – Ludwig Simon, German lawyer and politician (died 1872)
- 22 February – Adolph Douai, German-American socialist and abolitionist newspaper editor, journalist and teacher (died 1888)
- 25 February – Peter Friedhofen, German Roman Catholic professed religious and the founder of the Brothers of Mercy of Mary Help of Christians (died 1860)
- 1 March – Heinrich Adolf von Bardeleben, German surgeon (died 1895)
- 24 March – Friedrich Theodor von Frerichs, German pathologist (died 1889)
- 26 March – Louise Otto-Peters, German women's rights movement activist (died 1895)
- 31 March – Chlodwig, Prince of Hohenlohe-Schillingsfürst, Chancellor of Germany (died 1901)
- 11 April – Charles Hallé, German pianist and conductor (died 1895)
- 24 April – Klaus Groth, German poet (died 1899)
- 2 May – Gustav Becker, German clockmaker (died 1885)
- 7 May – Otto Wilhelm von Struve, German-Baltic astronomer (died 1905)
- 27 May – George V of Hanover, German monarch of kingdom Hannover (died 1878)
- 17 June – Albert Dulk, German writer (died 1884)
- 20 June – Jacques Offenbach, German composer (died 1880)
- 22 June – August Wöhler, German railway engineer (died 1914)
- 3 July – Théodore Gouvy, German composer (died 1898)
- 6 July – Ernst Wilhelm von Brücke, German physician and physiologist (died 1892)
- 16 July – Siegfried Heinrich Aronhold, German mathematician (died 1884)
- 20 July – Heinrich Bernhard Oppenheim, German publicist and philosopher (died 1880)
- 12 August – Johann Georg Ludwig Hesekiel, German writer (died 1874)
- 22 August – Johann Nepomuk Brischar, German Roman Catholic church historian (died 1897)
- 26 August – Prince Albert, Prince Consort to Queen Victoria (died 1861)
- 13 September – Clara Schumann, German composer and pianist (died 1896)
- 22 September – Wilhelm Wattenbach, German historian (died 1897)
- 16 October – Arnold Schaefer, German historian (died 1883)
- 17 October – Frederick William, Grand Duke of Mecklenburg-Strelitz, German sovereign (died 1904)
- 25 October – Christian August Friedrich Garcke, German botanist (died 1904)
- 12 November – Daniel Sanders, German lexicographer (died 1897)
- 16 November – Wilhelm Marr, German journalist (died 1904)
- 1 December – Philipp Krementz, German catholic bishop (died 1899)
- 22 December – Franz Abt, German composer and choral conductor (died 1885)
- 23 December – Carl Siegmund Franz Credé, German gynecologist and obstetrician (died 1892)
- 26 December – Hermann Blumenau, German pharmacist (died 1899)
- 30 December – Theodor Fontane, German writer (died 1898)

== Deaths ==
- 12 January – Benedikte Naubert, German writer (born 1752)
- 28 January – Johann Karl Wezel, German poet (born 1747)
- 10 March – Friedrich Heinrich Jacobi, German philosopher (born 1743)
- 23 March – August von Kotzebue, German dramatist (born 1761)
- 30 June – Ernst Ludwig Gerber, German composer (born 1746)
- 20 July – Xaver Hohenleiter, German criminal (born 1788)
- 29 July – Karl Friedrich Gottlob Wetzel, German writer (born 1779)
- 12 September – Gebhard Leberecht von Blücher, Prussian general (born 1742)
- 20 October – Karl Wilhelm Ferdinand Solger, German philosopher (born 1780)
- 5 December – Friedrich Leopold zu Stolberg-Stolberg, German poet (born 1750)
