= 1820 in Germany =

- Decades: 1800s; 1810s; 1820s; 1830s; 1840s
- See also: Other events of 1820; History of Germany • Timeline • Years

Events from the year 1820 in Germany.

== Incumbents ==
=== Kingdoms ===
- Kingdom of Prussia
  - Monarch – Frederick William III (16 November 1797 – 7 June 1840)
- Kingdom of Bavaria
  - Maximilian I (1 January 1806 – 13 October 1825)
- Kingdom of Saxony
  - Frederick Augustus I (20 December 1806 – 5 May 1827)
- Kingdom of Hanover
  - George III (25 October 1760 –29 January 1820)
  - George IV (29 January 1820 – 26 June 1830)
- Kingdom of Württemberg
  - William (30 October 1816 – 25 June 1864)

=== Grand Duchies ===
- Grand Duke of Baden
  - Louis I (8 December 1818 – 30 March 1830)
- Grand Duke of Hesse
  - Louis I (14 August 1806 – 6 April 1830)
- Grand Duke of Mecklenburg-Schwerin
  - Frederick Francis I– (24 April 1785 – 1 February 1837)
- Grand Duke of Mecklenburg-Strelitz
  - George (6 November 1816 – 6 September 1860)
- Grand Duke of Oldenburg
  - Wilhelm (6 July 1785 –2 July 1823 ) Due to mental illness, Wilhelm was a duke in name only, with his cousin Peter, Prince-Bishop of Lübeck, acting as regent throughout his entire reign.
  - Peter I (2 July 1823 - 21 May 1829)
- Grand Duke of Saxe-Weimar-Eisenach
  - Charles Frederick (14 June 1828 - 8 July 1853)

=== Principalities ===
- Schaumburg-Lippe
  - George William (13 February 1787 - 1860)
- Schwarzburg-Rudolstadt
  - Friedrich Günther (28 April 1807 - 28 June 1867)
- Schwarzburg-Sondershausen
  - Günther Friedrich Karl I (14 October 1794 - 19 August 1835)
- Principality of Lippe
  - Leopold II (5 November 1802 - 1 January 1851)
- Principality of Reuss-Greiz
  - Heinrich XIX (29 January 1817 - 31 October 1836)
- Waldeck and Pyrmont
  - George II (9 September 1813 - 15 May 1845)

=== Duchies ===
- Duke of Anhalt-Dessau
  - Leopold IV (9 August 1817 - 22 May 1871)
- Duke of Brunswick
  - Charles II (16 June 1815 – 9 September 1830)
- Duke of Saxe-Altenburg
  - Duke of Saxe-Hildburghausen (1780–1826) - Frederick
- Duke of Saxe-Coburg and Gotha
  - Ernest I (9 December 1806 – 12 November 1826)
- Duke of Saxe-Meiningen
  - Bernhard II (24 December 1803 – 20 September 1866)
- Duke of Schleswig-Holstein-Sonderburg-Beck
  - Frederick William (25 March 1816 – 6 July 1825)

== Events ==
- 28 January – German-Russian explorer Fabian Gottlieb von Bellingshausen discovers the continent of Antarctica during the First Russian Antarctic Expedition
- 15 April – King William I of Württemberg marries his cousin, Pauline Therese, in Stuttgart.
- 8 June – Constitution of the German Confederation
- 27 August – German Josef Naus makes the first ascent of Germany's highest mountain, the Zugspitze.
- 19 November – Congress of Troppau

== Births ==
- 13 January – Leopold Hoesch, German entrepreneur (died 1899)
- 16 January – Johannes Rebmann, German missionary (died 1878)
- 20 January – Wilhelm Paul Corssen, German philologist (died 1875)
- 22 January – Hermann Lingg, German poet (died 1905)
- 25 January – Adelbert Heinrich von Baudissin, German writer (died 1871)
- 23 February – David Kalisch, German playwright and humorist (died 1872)
- 4 March – Ludwig von Henk, German naval officer (died 1894)
- 7 April – Amand Goegg, German journalist and politician (died 1897)
- 10 April – Karl Gustav Ackermann, German politician (died 1901)
- 11 April – Hermann Knoblauch, German physicist (died 1895)
- 22 April – Karl Twesten, German politician and writer (died 1870)
- 2 May – Robert Gerwig, German civil engineer and politician (died 1882)
- 24 May – Carl Ferdinand Appun, German naturalist (died 1872)
- 13 June – Julius Faucher, German politician (died 1878)
- 21 June – Heinrich Burgers, German journalist and politician (died 1878)
- 27 June – Hermann Abeken, German political writer (died 1854)
- 11 July – Friedrich von Spiegel, German orientalist (died 1905)
- 14 July – Sigismund Koelle, German missionary (died 1902)
- 8 August – Julius Stern, German composer and pedagogue (died 1883)
- 15 August – Adolph von Pfretzschner, German politician (died 1901)
- 5 September – Georg Vierling, German composer [died 1901)
- 15 September – Hermann Heinrich Becker, German politician (died 1885)
- 27 September – Wilhelm Siegmund Teuffel, German classical scholar (died 1878)
- 1 October – Ludwig Meyn, Germann agricultural scientist, soil scientist, geologist, journalist, and mineralogist (died 1878)
- 4 October – Joseph Maximilian von Maillinger, Bavarian General der Infanterie and War Minister (died 1901)
- 13 October – Hans von Raumer, German politician (died 1851)
- 23 November – Ludwig von Hagn, German painter (died 1898)
- 28 November – Friedrich Engels, German social philosopher (died 1895)
- 29 November – Ferdinand Ludwig Herff, German-American physician (died 1912)
- 8 December – Rochus von Liliencron, German Germanist and historian (died 1912)
- 18 December – Karl Becker, German painter (died 1900)
- 31 December – Helene Demuth, German housekeeper (died 1890)

== Deaths ==
- 10 February – Margravine Elisabeth Louise of Brandenburg-Schwedt, German noblewomen (born 1738)
- 11 February – Karl von Fischer, German architect (born 1782)
- 29 February – Johann Joachim Eschenburg, German historian (born 1743)
- 7 March – Louis Engelbert, 6th Duke of Arenberg, German nobleman (born 1750)
- 27 March – Gerhard von Kügelgen, German painter (born 1772)
- 26 April – Christian Zais, German architect (born 1770)
- 14 May – Paul Struck, German composer (born 1776)
- 20 May – Karl Ludwig Sand, German university student and member of a liberal Burschenschaft (born 1795)
- 1 June – August Ferdinand Bernhardi, German linguist and writer (born 1769)
- 9 June – Wilhelmine, Gräfin von Lichtenau, German noblewomen (born 1753)
- 11 July – Frederick Traugott Pursh, German-Canadian botanist (born 1774)
- 13 September – Princess Adelheid of Anhalt-Bernburg-Schaumburg-Hoym, German noblewomen (born 1800)
- 19 September – Johann Georg Meusel, German historian (born 1743)
- 6 December – Karl Christian Tittmann, German Protestant theologian (born 1744)
- 29 December – Princess Pauline of Anhalt-Bernburg, German regent and social reformer (born 1769)
