= 1821 in Germany =

- Decades: 1800s; 1810s; 1820s; 1830s; 1840s
- See also: Other events of 1821; History of Germany • Timeline • Years

Events from the year 1821 in Germany

== Incumbents ==
=== Kingdoms ===
- Kingdom of Prussia
  - Monarch – Frederick William III (16 November 1797 – 7 June 1840)
- Kingdom of Bavaria
  - Maximilian I (1 January 1806 – 13 October 1825)
- Kingdom of Saxony
  - Frederick Augustus I (20 December 1806 – 5 May 1827)
- Kingdom of Hanover
  - George IV (29 January 1820 – 26 June 1830)
- Kingdom of Württemberg
  - William (30 October 1816 – 25 June 1864)

=== Grand Duchies ===
- Grand Duke of Baden
  - Louis I (8 December 1818 – 30 March 1830)
- Grand Duke of Hesse
  - Louis I (14 August 1806 – 6 April 1830)
- Grand Duke of Mecklenburg-Schwerin
  - Frederick Francis I– (24 April 1785 – 1 February 1837)
- Grand Duke of Mecklenburg-Strelitz
  - George (6 November 1816 – 6 September 1860)
- Grand Duke of Oldenburg
  - Wilhelm (6 July 1785 –2 July 1823 ) Due to mental illness, Wilhelm was duke in name only, with his cousin Peter, Prince-Bishop of Lübeck, acting as regent throughout his entire reign.
  - Peter I (2 July 1823 - 21 May 1829)
- Grand Duke of Saxe-Weimar-Eisenach
  - Charles Frederick (14 June 1828 - 8 July 1853)

=== Principalities ===
- Schaumburg-Lippe
  - George William (13 February 1787 - 1860)
- Schwarzburg-Rudolstadt
  - Friedrich Günther (28 April 1807 - 28 June 1867)
- Schwarzburg-Sondershausen
  - Günther Friedrich Karl I (14 October 1794 - 19 August 1835)
- Principality of Lippe
  - Leopold II (5 November 1802 - 1 January 1851)
- Principality of Reuss-Greiz
  - Heinrich XIX (29 January 1817 - 31 October 1836)
- Waldeck and Pyrmont
  - George II (9 September 1813 - 15 May 1845)

=== Duchies ===
- Duke of Anhalt-Dessau
  - Leopold IV (9 August 1817 - 22 May 1871)
- Duke of Brunswick
  - Charles II (16 June 1815 – 9 September 1830)
- Duke of Saxe-Altenburg
  - Duke of Saxe-Hildburghausen (1780–1826) - Frederick
- Duke of Saxe-Coburg and Gotha
  - Ernest I (9 December 1806 – 12 November 1826)
- Duke of Saxe-Meiningen
  - Bernhard II (24 December 1803 – 20 September 1866)
- Duke of Schleswig-Holstein-Sonderburg-Beck
  - Frederick William (25 March 1816 – 6 July 1825)

== Events ==
- Prince Ludwig I of Bavaria, wishing to build a monument to German unity and heroism (and the defeat of Napoleon), commissions Leo von Klenze to build a replica of the Parthenon on a bluff overlooking the Danube River near Regensburg, the Walhalla memorial.
- The only two issues of Der Bibel'sche Orient appear in Munich (April 24 and August 12).
- Ludwig van Beethoven – Piano Sonata No. 31
- Franz Schubert
  - "Gesang der Geister über den Wassern", D.714; part song for male voices and low strings; Op.posth. 167 (1858)
  - Symphony No. 7 in E major, D 729
- Carl Maria von Weber – Konzertstück in F minor, for piano and orchestra, Op. 79

== Births ==
- 27 January – August Becker, German landscape painter (died 1887)
- 19 February – August Schleicher, German linguist (d. 1868)
- 1 March – Joseph Hubert Reinkens, German Old Catholic bishop (d. 1896)
- 17 May – Sebastian Kneipp, German naturopath (d. 1897)
- 18 May – Eduard von Pestel, Prussian military officer and German general (d. 1908)
- 17 July – Friedrich Engelhorn, German industrialist and founder of BASF (d. 1902)
- 31 August – Hermann von Helmholtz, German physician and physicist (d. 1894)
- 13 October – Rudolf Virchow, German physician, pathologist, biologist, and politician (d. 1902)

== Deaths ==
- 20 April– Franz Karl Achard, German chemist, physicist and biologist (b. 1753)
- 22 May – Johann Georg Heinrich Feder, German philosopher (born 1740)
- 10 September – Johann Dominicus Fiorillo, German painter, art historian (b. 1748)
- 14 September – Heinrich Kuhl, German naturalist, zoologist (b. 1797)
- 21 October – Dorothea Ackermann, German actress (b. 1752)
