= 1822 in Germany =

- Decades: 1800s; 1810s; 1820s; 1830s; 1840s
- See also: Other events of 1822; History of Germany • Timeline • Years

Events from the year 1822 in Germany

== Incumbents ==
=== Kingdoms ===
- Kingdom of Prussia
  - Monarch – Frederick William III (16 November 1797 – 7 June 1840)
- Kingdom of Bavaria
  - Maximilian I (1 January 1806 – 13 October 1825)
- Kingdom of Saxony
  - Frederick Augustus I (20 December 1806 – 5 May 1827)
- Kingdom of Hanover
  - George IV (29 January 1820 – 26 June 1830)
- Kingdom of Württemberg
  - William (30 October 1816 – 25 June 1864)

=== Grand Duchies ===
- Grand Duke of Baden
  - Louis I (8 December 1818 – 30 March 1830)
- Grand Duke of Hesse
  - Louis I (14 August 1806 – 6 April 1830)
- Grand Duke of Mecklenburg-Schwerin
  - Frederick Francis I– (24 April 1785 – 1 February 1837)
- Grand Duke of Mecklenburg-Strelitz
  - George (6 November 1816 – 6 September 1860)
- Grand Duke of Oldenburg
  - Wilhelm (6 July 1785 –2 July 1823 ) Due to mental illness, Wilhelm was duke in name only, with his cousin Peter, Prince-Bishop of Lübeck, acting as regent throughout his entire reign.
  - Peter I (2 July 1823 - 21 May 1829)
- Grand Duke of Saxe-Weimar-Eisenach
  - Charles Frederick (14 June 1828 - 8 July 1853)

=== Principalities ===
- Schaumburg-Lippe
  - George William (13 February 1787 - 1860)
- Schwarzburg-Rudolstadt
  - Friedrich Günther (28 April 1807 - 28 June 1867)
- Schwarzburg-Sondershausen
  - Günther Friedrich Karl I (14 October 1794 - 19 August 1835)
- Principality of Lippe
  - Leopold II (5 November 1802 - 1 January 1851)
- Principality of Reuss-Greiz
  - Heinrich XIX (29 January 1817 - 31 October 1836)
- Waldeck and Pyrmont
  - George II (9 September 1813 - 15 May 1845)

=== Duchies ===
- Duke of Anhalt-Dessau
  - Leopold IV (9 August 1817 - 22 May 1871)
- Duke of Brunswick
  - Charles II (16 June 1815 – 9 September 1830)
- Duke of Saxe-Altenburg
  - Duke of Saxe-Hildburghausen (1780–1826) - Frederick
- Duke of Saxe-Coburg and Gotha
  - Ernest I (9 December 1806 – 12 November 1826)
- Duke of Saxe-Meiningen
  - Bernhard II (24 December 1803 – 20 September 1866)
- Duke of Schleswig-Holstein-Sonderburg-Beck
  - Frederick William (25 March 1816 – 6 July 1825)

== Events ==
- "Rostocker Pfeilstorch", a white stork, is found in northern Germany with an arrow from central Africa through its neck, demonstrating the fact of bird migration.
- The Rhine Province, the westernmost province of the Kingdom of Prussia and the Free State of Prussia, within the German Reich, established from 1822 to 1946.
- Röchling SE & Co. KG, a plastics engineering company headquartered in Mannheim, Baden-Württemberg, Germany is established.
- Franckh-Kosmos Verlags-GmbH & Co., a media publishing house based in Stuttgart, Germany, founded.
- Sternburg-Export was first brewed by Maximilian Freiherr Speck von Sternburg

== Births ==
- 2 January – Rudolf Clausius, German physicist (d. 1888)
- 6 January-Heinrich Schliemann, German archaeologist (d. 1890)
- 18 April – August Heinrich Petermann, German cartographer (died 1878)
- 27 August – Theodor Martens, German painter (died 1884)

== Deaths ==
- 14 January – Franz Kobell, German painter, etcher and draftsman (born 1749)
- 22 January – Rudolph Schadow, German sculptor (born 1786)
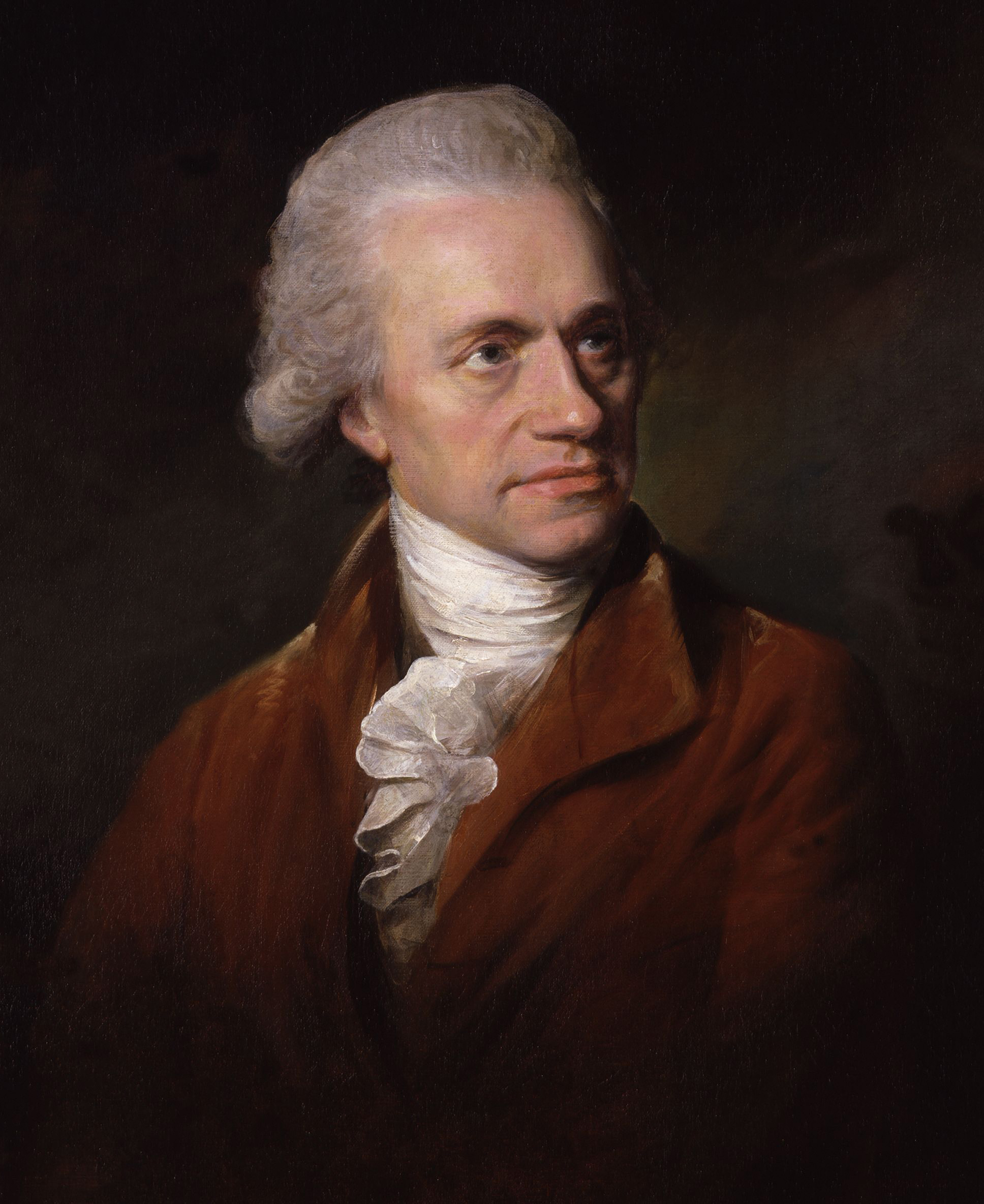
  William Herschel
  16 January – Elisabeth Berenberg, German banker (b. 1749)
- 23 February – Johann Matthäus Bechstein, German naturalist (born 1757)
- 3 April – Friedrich Justin Bertuch, German patron of the arts (born 1747)
- 27 May – Augustus, Duke of Saxe-Gotha-Altenburg (b. 1772)
- 25 June – E. T. A. Hoffmann, German Romantic writer (born 1776)
- 25 August – William Herschel, German-born British astronomer (b. 1738)
- 26 November – Karl August von Hardenberg, Prussian politician (b. 1750)
- 8 December – Saul Ascher, German political writer and translator (born 1767)
- 28 December – Albert Christoph Dies, German painter and composer (born 1755)
