= 1825 in Germany =

- Decades: 1800s; 1810s; 1820s; 1830s; 1840s
- See also: Other events of 1825; History of Germany • Timeline • Years

Events from the year 1825 in Germany

== Incumbents ==
=== Kingdoms ===
- Kingdom of Prussia
  - Monarch – Frederick William III (16 November 1797 – 7 June 1840)
- Kingdom of Bavaria
  - Maximilian I (1 January 1806 – 13 October 1825)
  - Ludwig I (13 October 1825 – 20 March 1848)
- Kingdom of Saxony
  - Frederick Augustus I (20 December 1806 – 5 May 1827)
- Kingdom of Hanover
  - George IV (29 January 1820 – 26 June 1830)
- Kingdom of Württemberg
  - William (30 October 1816 – 25 June 1864)

=== Grand Duchies ===
- Grand Duke of Baden
  - Louis I (8 December 1818 – 30 March 1830)
- Grand Duke of Hesse
  - Louis I (14 August 1806 – 6 April 1830)
- Grand Duke of Mecklenburg-Schwerin
  - Frederick Francis I– (24 April 1785 – 1 February 1837)
- Grand Duke of Mecklenburg-Strelitz
  - George (6 November 1816 – 6 September 1860)
- Grand Duke of Oldenburg
  - Peter I (2 July 1823 - 21 May 1829)
- Grand Duke of Saxe-Weimar-Eisenach
  - Charles Frederick (14 June 1828 - 8 July 1853)

=== Principalities ===
- Schaumburg-Lippe
  - George William (13 February 1787 - 1860)
- Schwarzburg-Rudolstadt
  - Friedrich Günther (28 April 1807 - 28 June 1867)
- Schwarzburg-Sondershausen
  - Günther Friedrich Karl I (14 October 1794 - 19 August 1835)
- Principality of Lippe
  - Leopold II (5 November 1802 - 1 January 1851)
- Principality of Reuss-Greiz
  - Heinrich XIX (29 January 1817 - 31 October 1836)
- Waldeck and Pyrmont
  - George II (9 September 1813 - 15 May 1845)

=== Duchies ===
- Duke of Anhalt-Dessau
  - Leopold IV (9 August 1817 - 22 May 1871)
- Duke of Brunswick
  - Charles II (16 June 1815 – 9 September 1830)
- Duke of Saxe-Altenburg
  - Duke of Saxe-Hildburghausen (1780–1826) and Duke of Saxe-Altenburg (1826–1834) - Frederick
- Duke of Saxe-Coburg and Gotha
  - Ernest I (9 December 1806 – 12 November 1826)
- Duke of Saxe-Meiningen
  - Bernhard II (24 December 1803–20 September 1866)
- Duke of Schleswig-Holstein-Sonderburg-Glücksburg
  - Frederick William (6 July 1825 – 17 February 1831)

== Events ==
- February – February flood of 1825
- 6 July – The Duke of Schleswig-Holstein-Sonderburg-Beck gains possession of Glücksburg and changes his title to Friedrich Wilhelm, Duke of Schleswig-Holstein-Sonderburg-Glücksburg. The line of Schleswig-Holstein-Sonderburg-Glücksburg later becomes the royal house of Greece, Denmark and Norway.

== Births ==
14 July – Adolf Cluss, German-born architect in Washington, D.C. (died 1905)

== Deaths ==
- 23 April – Maler Müller, German poet, dramatist and painter (born 1749)
- 13 June – Johann Peter Melchior, German porcelain modeller (born 1742)
- 12 July – Dorothea von Rodde-Schlözer, German scholar (b. 1770)
- 13 October – King Maximilian I Joseph of Bavaria (b. 1756)
- 14 November – Jean Paul, German writer (b. 1763)
- 17 November – Daniel Berger, German engraver (born 1744)
