= 1897 in Germany =

- Decades: 1870s; 1880s; 1890s; 1900s; 1910s
- See also: Other events of 1897; History of Germany • Timeline • Years

Events in the year 1897 in Germany.

== Incumbents ==
=== National level ===
- Emperor – Wilhelm II
- Chancellor – Chlodwig, Prince of Hohenlohe-Schillingsfürst

=== State level ===
==== Kingdoms ====
- King of Bavaria – Otto
- King of Prussia – Wilhelm II
- King of Saxony – Albert
- King of Württemberg – William II

==== Grand Duchies ====
- Grand Duke of Baden – Frederick I
- Grand Duke of Hesse – Ernest Louis
- Grand Duke of Mecklenburg-Schwerin – Frederick Francis III to 10 April, then Frederick Francis IV
- Grand Duke of Mecklenburg-Strelitz – Frederick William
- Grand Duke of Oldenburg – Peter II
- Grand Duke of Saxe-Weimar-Eisenach – Charles Alexander

==== Principalities ====
- Schaumburg-Lippe – George, Prince of Schaumburg-Lippe
- Schwarzburg-Rudolstadt – Günther Victor, Prince of Schwarzburg-Rudolstadt
- Schwarzburg-Sondershausen – Karl Günther, Prince of Schwarzburg-Sondershausen
- Principality of Lippe – Alexander, Prince of Lippe (with Prince Adolf of Schaumburg-Lippe to 17 July, then Ernest II, Count of Lippe-Biesterfeld, as regent)
- Reuss Elder Line – Heinrich XXII, Prince Reuss of Greiz
- Reuss Younger Line – Heinrich XIV, Prince Reuss Younger Line
- Waldeck and Pyrmont – Friedrich, Prince of Waldeck and Pyrmont

==== Duchies ====
- Duke of Anhalt – Frederick I, Duke of Anhalt
- Duke of Brunswick – Prince Albert of Prussia (regent)
- Duke of Saxe-Altenburg – Ernst I, Duke of Saxe-Altenburg
- Duke of Saxe-Coburg and Gotha – Alfred, Duke of Saxe-Coburg and Gotha
- Duke of Saxe-Meiningen – Georg II, Duke of Saxe-Meiningen

==== Colonial Governors ====
- Cameroon (Kamerun) – Theodor Seitz (2nd term) to 10 September, then Jesko von Puttkamer (5th term) from 11 September
- German East Africa (Deutsch-Ostafrika) – Eduard von Liebert
- German New Guinea (Deutsch-Neuguinea) – Curt von Hagen to 13 August, then Albert Hahl (acting) (1st term) to 11 September, then Hugo Skopnik (all Landeshauptleute of the German New Guinea Company)
- German South-West Africa (Deutsch-Südwestafrika) – Theodor Leutwein (Landeshauptleute)
- Togoland – August Köhler (Landeshauptleute)

== Events ==
- 10 May – The Handelsgesetzbuch (HGB) is passed by the Reichtstag. The HGB will come into force together with the Bürgerliches Gesetzbuch (BGB) on 1 January 1900.
- 10 August – Rudolf Diesel builds his first working prototype Diesel engine in Augsburg.
- 10 October – Chemists working at Bayer AG create a synthetically altered version of salicin which the company names Aspirin.

=== Undated ===
- David Hilbert unifies the field of algebraic number theory with his treatise Zahlbericht.
- The Daimler Victoria—the world's first meter-equipped (and gasoline-powered) taxicab—was built by Gottlieb Daimler in 1897.

== Births ==
- 9 January – Karl Löwith, German philosopher (died 1973)
- 14 January – Hasso von Manteuffel, German general during World War II (died 1978)
- 4 February – Ludwig Erhard, Chancellor of Germany (died 1977)
- 19 February – Willi Domgraf-Fassbaender, German opera singer (died 1978)
- 2 March – Gurit Kadman, German-born Israeli dance instructor and choreographer (died 1987)
- 8 April – Will Dohm, German actor (died 1948)
- 9 April – Ernst Melsheimer, German lawyer (died 1960)
- 19 April – Bruno Diekmann, German politician (died 1982)
- 11 May – Kurt Gerron, German actor (died 1944)
- 16 June – Georg Wittig, German chemist, Nobel Prize in Chemistry laureate (died 1987
- 27 June – Heinz von Cleve, German actor (died 1984)
- 5 July – Paul Ben-Haim (born Paul Frankenburger), German-born Israeli composer (died 1984)
- 17 July – Max Knoll, German electrical engineer (died 1969)
- 4 August – Adolf Heusinger, German general (died 1982)
- 10 August – Nikolaus, Hereditary Grand Duke of Oldenburg (died 1970)
- 30 August – August Bach, German politician (died 1966)
- 28 October – Hans Speidel, German general (died 1984)
- 29 October – Joseph Goebbels, German politician (died 1945)
- 12 November – Karl Marx, German composer (died 1985)
- 23 November – Fritz Steinhoff, German politician (died 1969)
- 5 December – Gershom Scholem (born Gerhard Scholem), German-born Israeli philosopher and historian (died 1982)
- 14 December – Thomas Dehler, German politician (died 1967)
- Full date unknown – Shimon Fritz Bodenheimer, German-born Israeli biologist and zoologist (died 1959)

== Deaths ==
- 19 February – Karl Weierstrass, German mathematician (born 1815)
- 11 March – Daniel Sanders, German lexicographer (born 1819)
- 3 April – Johannes Brahms, German German composer and pianist (born 1833)
- 10 April – Frederick Francis III, Grand Duke of Mecklenburg-Schwerin (born 1851)
- 11 April – Johann Nepomuk Brischar, German Roman Catholic church historian (born 1819)
- 17 June – Sebastian Kneipp, German priest (born 1821)
- 21 July – Amand Goegg, German journalist and politician (born 1820)
- 8 August – Viktor Meyer, German chemist (born 1848)
- 20 September – Wilhelm Wattenbach, German historian (born 1819)
- 30 September – Leopold Auerbach, German anatomist and neuropathologist (born 1828)
- 1 November — Ulrike Henschke, German women's right activist and education reformer (born 1830)
- 3 December – Friedrich August Theodor Winnecke, German astronomer (born 1835)
