= 1830 in Germany =

- Decades: 1810s; 1820s; 1830s; 1840s; 1850s
- See also: Other events of 1830; History of Germany • Timeline • Years

Events from the year 1830 in Germany

== Incumbents ==
=== Kingdoms ===
- Kingdom of Prussia
  - Monarch – Frederick William III (16 November 1797 – 7 June 1840)
- Kingdom of Bavaria
  - Monarch - Ludwig I (1825–1848)
- Kingdom of Saxony
  - Anthony (5 May 1827 – 6 June 1836)
- Kingdom of Hanover
  - George IV (29 January 1820 – 26 June 1830)
- Kingdom of Württemberg
  - William (30 October 1816 – 25 June 1864)

=== Grand Duchies ===
- Grand Duke of Baden
  - Louis I (8 December 1818 – 30 March 1830)
- Grand Duke of Hesse
  - Louis I (14 August 1806 – 6 April 1830)
- Grand Duke of Mecklenburg-Schwerin
  - Frederick Francis I– (24 April 1785 – 1 February 1837)
- Grand Duke of Mecklenburg-Strelitz
  - George (6 November 1816 – 6 September 1860)
- Grand Duke of Oldenburg
  - Peter I (2 July 1823 - 21 May 1829)
- Grand Duke of Saxe-Weimar-Eisenach
  - Charles Frederick (14 June 1828 - 8 July 1853)

=== Principalities ===
- Schaumburg-Lippe
  - George William (13 February 1787 - 1860)
- Schwarzburg-Rudolstadt
  - Friedrich Günther (28 April 1807 - 28 June 1867)
- Schwarzburg-Sondershausen
  - Günther Friedrich Karl I (14 October 1794 - 19 August 1835)
- Principality of Lippe
  - Leopold II (5 November 1802 - 1 January 1851)
- Principality of Reuss-Greiz
  - Heinrich XIX (29 January 1817 - 31 October 1836)
- Waldeck and Pyrmont
  - George II (9 September 1813 - 15 May 1845)

=== Duchies ===
- Duke of Anhalt-Dessau
  - Leopold IV (9 August 1817 - 22 May 1871)
- Duke of Brunswick
  - Charles II (16 June 1815 – 9 September 1830)
- Duke of Saxe-Altenburg
  - Duke of Saxe-Hildburghausen (1780–1826) and Duke of Saxe-Altenburg (1826–1834) - Frederick
- Duke of Saxe-Meiningen
  - Bernhard II (24 December 1803–20 September 1866)

== Events ==
- The Glyptothek museum in Munich, designed by Leo von Klenze, is completed.

== Births ==
- 7 January – Albert Bierstadt, German-American painter (d. 1902)
- 8 January – Hans von Bülow, German conductor, pianist and composer (d. 1894)
- 15 March – Paul Heyse, German writer, Nobel Prize laureate (d. 1914)
- 25 July – John Jacob Bausch, German-American optician who co-founded Bausch & Lomb (d. 1926)

== Deaths ==
- 19 January – Johann Schweighäuser, German classical scholar (b. 1742)
- 17 or 30 January – Wilhelm Waiblinger, German Romantic poet (born 1804)
- 2 March – Samuel Thomas von Sömmerring, German physician, anatomist (b. 1755)
- 22 August – Jakob Wilhelm Roux, German draughtsman and painter (born 1771)
- 4 October – Ludwig Yorck von Wartenburg, Prussian military leader (b. 1759)
- 18 November – Adam Weishaupt, German philosopher (b. 1748)
- 20 November – Gustav von Ewers, German legal historian (born 1781)
