= 1890 in Germany =

- Decades: 1870s; 1880s; 1890s; 1900s; 1910s
- See also: Other events of 1890; History of Germany • Timeline • Years

Events in the year 1890 in Germany.

== Incumbents ==
=== National level ===
- Emperor – Wilhelm II
- Chancellor – Otto von Bismarck to March 20, then Leo von Caprivi

=== State level ===
==== Kingdoms ====
- King of Bavaria – Otto
- King of Prussia – Wilhelm II
- King of Saxony – Albert
- King of Württemberg – Charles

==== Grand Duchies ====
- Grand Duke of Baden – Frederick I
- Grand Duke of Hesse – Louis IV
- Grand Duke of Mecklenburg-Schwerin – Frederick Francis III
- Grand Duke of Mecklenburg-Strelitz – Frederick William
- Grand Duke of Oldenburg – Peter II
- Grand Duke of Saxe-Weimar-Eisenach – Charles Alexander

==== Principalities ====
- Schaumburg-Lippe – Adolf I, Prince of Schaumburg-Lippe
- Schwarzburg-Rudolstadt – George Albert, Prince of Schwarzburg-Rudolstadt to 12 March, then Günther Victor, Prince of Schwarzburg-Rudolstadt
- Schwarzburg-Sondershausen – Karl Günther, Prince of Schwarzburg-Sondershausen
- Principality of Lippe – Woldemar, Prince of Lippe
- Reuss Elder Line – Heinrich XXII, Prince Reuss of Greiz
- Reuss Younger Line – Heinrich XIV, Prince Reuss Younger Line
- Waldeck and Pyrmont – George Victor, Prince of Waldeck and Pyrmont

==== Duchies ====
- Duke of Anhalt – Frederick I, Duke of Anhalt
- Duke of Brunswick – Prince Albert of Prussia (regent)
- Duke of Saxe-Altenburg – Ernst I, Duke of Saxe-Altenburg
- Duke of Saxe-Coburg and Gotha – Ernst II, Duke of Saxe-Coburg and Gotha
- Duke of Saxe-Meiningen – Georg II, Duke of Saxe-Meiningen

==== Colonial Governors ====
- Cameroon (Kamerun) – Eugen von Zimmerer (acting governor) (2nd term) to (17 April), then Markus Graf Pfeil, to 3 August, then ... Kurz (acting governor) to December 2, then Jesko von Puttkamer (acting governor) (2nd term)
- German East Africa (Deutsch-Ostafrika) – Hermann Wissmann (commissioner) (1st term)
- German New Guinea (Deutsch-Neuguinea) – Fritz Rose (acting commissioner to 30 September, then commissioner)
- German South-West Africa (Deutsch-Südwestafrika) – Heinrich Ernst Göring (acting commissioner) to August, then Louis Nels (acting commissioner)
- Togoland – Eugen von Zimmerer (commissioner)
- Wituland (Deutsch-Witu) – Gustav Denhardt (resident) to 1 July

== Events ==
- 5 February – German company Allianz is founded in Berlin.
- 20 February – German federal election, 1890.
- 18 March Otto von Bismarck resigned. From 1862 to 1890, he held office as the minister president and foreign minister of Prussia
- 20 March - Leo von Caprivi shift begins
- 20 March – Bismarck cabinet ends.
- 30 April - Founding of the German Naval League
- May - Introduction of the Old Age and Disability Insurance Law
- 31 May — The Ulm Minster is completed as the world's tallest cathedral.
- 1 July — Heligoland–Zanzibar Treaty. Germany receives Heligoland and the Caprivi Strip from the United Kingdom and a free hand to control and acquire the coast of Dar es Salaam. In return, Germany renounces its protectorate over Wituland (part of modern-day Kenya) and pledges not to interfere in the actions of the UK vis-à-vis the Sultanate of Zanzibar. The U.K. cedes sovereignty of the Heligoland archipelago to Germany.
- 16 July - German company Mannesmann is founded in Düsseldorf.
- August — Kaiser Wilhelm and Tsar Alexander III of Russia meet at Narva after the Reinsurance Treaty expired. Kaiser Wilhelm decided to rejected the renewal offer from Russian Empire.
- 1 October, Anti-Socialist Laws were expired because the Reichstag refused to renew it. Leading to the official formation of the Social Democratic Party of Germany.

=== Date unknown ===
- German physician and physiologist Emil von Behring publishes an article with Kitasato Shibasaburo reporting that they have developed "antitoxins" against both diphtheria and tetanus in Berlin.
- Founding of the literary magazine Neue Rundschau - the magazine was founded in 1890 (initially as Freie Bühne für modernes Leben) by Otto Brahm and S. Fischer Verlag in Berlin.

== Births ==
- 9 January – Kurt Tucholsky, German journalist, satirist and writer (died 1935)
- 30 January – Albert Zürner, German diver (died 1920)
- 6 February – Karl Schelenz, German sport teacher (died 1956)
- 20 February – Georg Thomas, German general (died 1946)
- 5 March – Wilhelm Boden, German politician (died 1961)
- 22 March – Ewald von Kleist-Schmenzin, German politician (died 1945)
- 22 April – Erwin Jaenecke, German general (died 1960)
- 10 May – Alfred Jodl, German general (died 1946)
- 15 June – Wilhelm Leuschner, German politician (died 1944)
- 25 June – Hans Marchwitza, German writer and poet (died 1965)
- 4 July – Otto Feick, German gymnast (died 1959)
- 8 July – Walter Hasenclever, German poet and playwright (died 1940)
- 29 July – Elisabeth von Thadden, German educator and resistance fighter (died 1944)
- 30 July – Ludwig Schwamb, German politician (died 1945)
- 3 August – Eduard Zuckmayer, German writer and playwright (died 1972)
- 4 August – Erich Weinert, German author (died 1953)
- 14 August – Bruno Tesch, German chemist and Nazi war criminal (died 1946)
- 18 August – Walther Funk, German banker and economist (died 1960)
- 19 August – Augusta Victoria of Hohenzollern, German-born Queen consort of Portugal in exile (d. 1966)
- 22 August – Hans-Joachim Buddecke, German World War I fighter pilot and ace (died 1918)
- 16 September – Traugott Herr, German general (died 1976)
- 21 September – Max Immelmann, German World War I fighter ace (died 1916)
- 23 September – Friedrich Paulus, German field marshal (died 1957)
- 8 October – Henrich Focke, German aviation pioneer (d. 1979)
- 10 October – Emil Schäpe, German fighter pilot (died 1925)
- 29 October – Hans-Valentin Hube, German army general (d. 1944)
- 8 November – Conrad Weygand, German chemist (died 1945)
- 2 December – C. Paul Jennewein, German-American sculptor (died 1978)
- 6 December:
  - Hans Bethge, German pilot (died 1918)
  - Carl Jules Weyl, German-American art director and Reichswehr soldier (died 1948)
- 17 December – Prince Joachim of Prussia, German nobleman (died 1920)

== Deaths ==
- 7 January - Augusta of Saxe-Weimar-Eisenach, German queen (born 1811)
- 20 January – Franz Lachner, German composer and conductor (born 1803)
- 27 January – Karl Friedrich Otto Westphal, German psychiatrist (born 1833)
- 18 March – Johann Georg Halske, German businessman (born 1814)
- 19 March – George Albert, Prince of Schwarzburg-Rudolstadt, German nobleman (born 1838)
- 27 March – Carl Jacob Löwig, German chemist (born 1803)
- 30 April – Hermann von Dechend, German politician who served as the first President of the Reichsbank (born 1814)
- 26 May – Adelbert Delbrück, German banker and businessman (born 1822)
- 27 August - Emil Otto Grundmann, German painter (born 1844)
- 3 September - Johann von Lutz, German politician (born 1826)
- 15 September – Christian Ferdinand Friedrich Krauss, German scientist (born 1812)
- 19 September – Friedrich Gaedcke, German chemist (born 1828)
- 23 September - Lorenz von Stein, German economist and sociologist (born 1815)
- 4 November - Helene Demuth, German housekeeper (born 1820)
- 3 December – Gottfried Ludolf Camphausen, German politician (born 1803)
- 26 December - Heinrich Schliemann, German businessman and a pioneer in the field of archaeology (born 1822)
