= 1826 in Germany =

- Decades: 1800s; 1810s; 1820s; 1830s; 1840s
- See also: Other events of 1826; History of Germany • Timeline • Years

Events from the year 1826 in Germany

== Incumbents ==
=== Kingdoms ===
- Kingdom of Prussia
  - Monarch – Frederick William III (16 November 1797 – 7 June 1840)
- Kingdom of Bavaria
  - Monarch - Ludwig I (1825–1848)
- Kingdom of Saxony
  - Frederick Augustus I (20 December 1806 – 5 May 1827)
- Kingdom of Hanover
  - George IV (29 January 1820 – 26 June 1830)
- Kingdom of Württemberg
  - William (30 October 1816 – 25 June 1864)

=== Grand Duchies ===
- Grand Duke of Baden
  - Louis I (8 December 1818 – 30 March 1830)
- Grand Duke of Hesse
  - Louis I (14 August 1806 – 6 April 1830)
- Grand Duke of Mecklenburg-Schwerin
  - Frederick Francis I– (24 April 1785 – 1 February 1837)
- Grand Duke of Mecklenburg-Strelitz
  - George (6 November 1816 – 6 September 1860)
- Grand Duke of Oldenburg
  - Peter I (2 July 1823 - 21 May 1829)
- Grand Duke of Saxe-Weimar-Eisenach
  - Charles Frederick (14 June 1828 - 8 July 1853)

=== Principalities ===
- Schaumburg-Lippe
  - George William (13 February 1787 - 1860)
- Schwarzburg-Rudolstadt
  - Friedrich Günther (28 April 1807 - 28 June 1867)
- Schwarzburg-Sondershausen
  - Günther Friedrich Karl I (14 October 1794 - 19 August 1835)
- Principality of Lippe
  - Leopold II (5 November 1802 - 1 January 1851)
- Principality of Reuss-Greiz
  - Heinrich XIX (29 January 1817 - 31 October 1836)
- Waldeck and Pyrmont
  - George II (9 September 1813 - 15 May 1845)

=== Duchies ===
- Duke of Anhalt-Dessau
  - Leopold IV (9 August 1817 - 22 May 1871)
- Duke of Brunswick
  - Charles II (16 June 1815 – 9 September 1830)
- Duke of Saxe-Altenburg
  - Duke of Saxe-Hildburghausen (1780–1826) and Duke of Saxe-Altenburg (1826–1834) - Frederick
- Duke of Saxe-Coburg and Gotha
  - Ernest I (9 December 1806 – 12 November 1826)
- Duke of Saxe-Meiningen
  - Bernhard II (24 December 1803–20 September 1866)

== Events ==
- July – Ludwig van Beethoven puts the finishing touches on the String Quartet in C sharp Minor, Opus 131, the jewel in the crown of his late string quartets.
- Ludwig van Beethoven composes the Große Fuge.

== Births ==
- February 16- Joseph Victor von Scheffel, German poet (d. 1888)
- March 29 – Wilhelm Liebknecht, German journalist, politician (d. 1900)

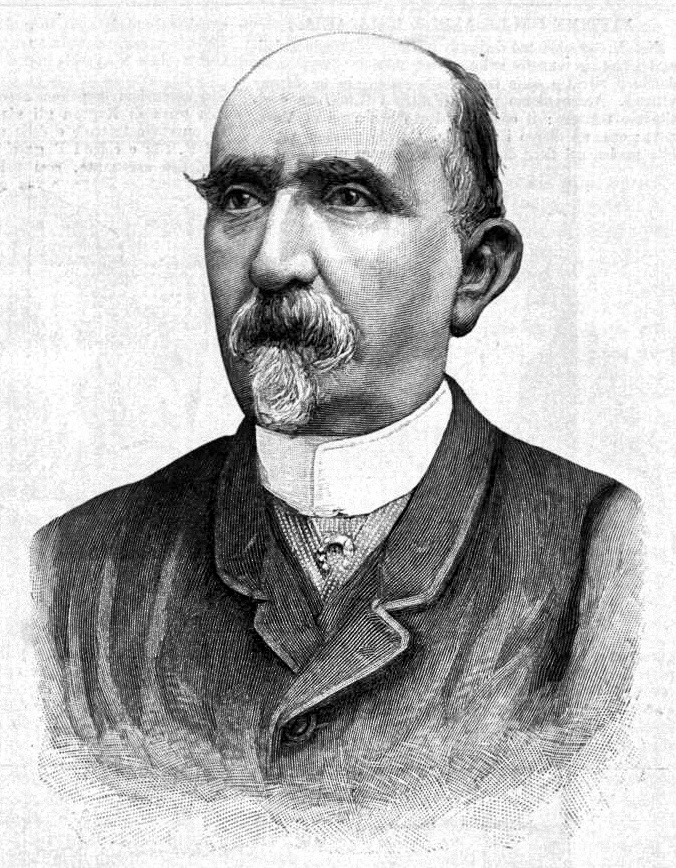
Carlo Collodi

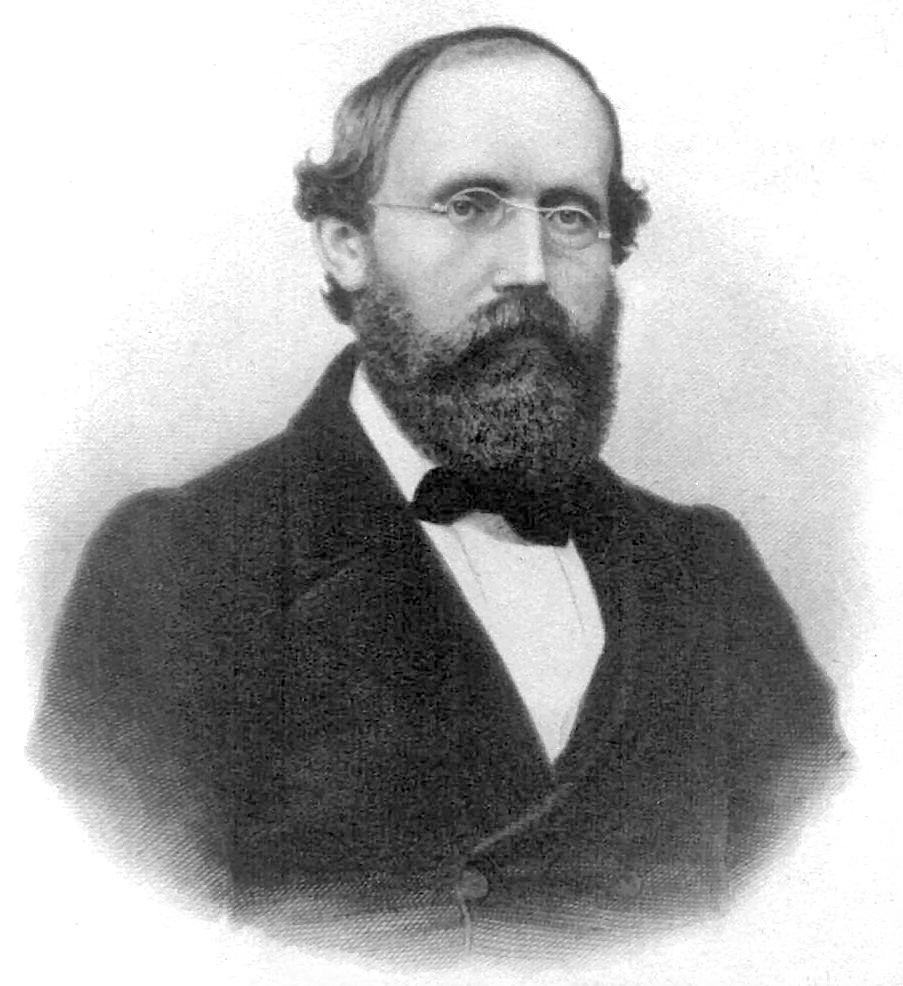
Bernhard Riemann

- August 21 – Carl Gegenbaur, German anatomist, professor (d. 1903)
- September 17 – Bernhard Riemann, German mathematician (d. 1866)

== Deaths ==
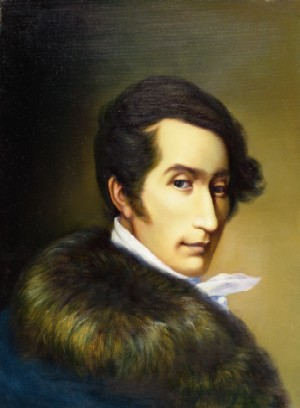
Carl Maria von Weber

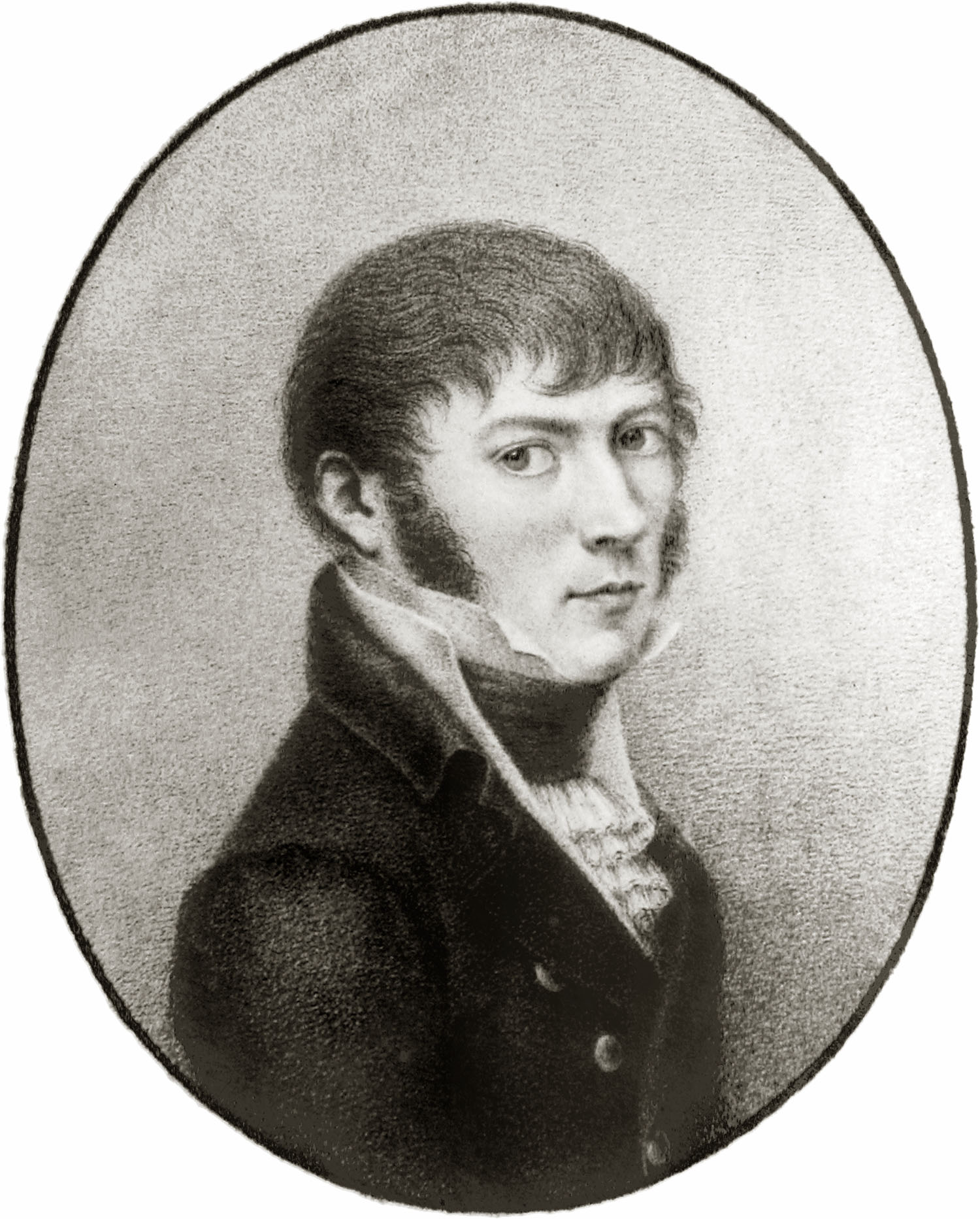
Joseph von Fraunhofer

- March 29 – Johann Heinrich Voss, German poet (b. 1751)
- April 25 – Karl Ludwig von Phull, German military leader (b. 1757)
- May 16 – Empress Elizabeth Alexeievna, consort of Alexander I of Russia (b. 1779)
- June 5 – Carl Maria von Weber, German composer (b. 1786)
- June 7 – Joseph von Fraunhofer, German optician (b. 1787)
- November 23 – Johann Elert Bode, German astronomer (b. 1747)
