= Henschke (surname) =

Henschke is a surname. Notable people with the surname include:

- Francis Henschke (1892–1968), Australian Catholic bishop
- Ian Henschke (born 1955), Chief Advocate for National Seniors Australia
- Ulrike Henschke (1830–1897), German women's rights activist

== See also ==
- Henschke, winery in South Australia
- Klabund (born Alfred Henschke, 1890–1928), German novelist
