= Tittmann =

Tittmann is a surname. Notable people with the surname include:

- Fritz Tittmann (1898–1945), German politician
- Harold H. Tittmann Jr. (1893–1980), American diplomat
- Karl Christian Tittmann (1744–1820), German theologian
- Otto Hilgard Tittmann (1850–1938), American geographer and astronomer
