= 1831 in Germany =

- Decades: 1810s; 1820s; 1830s; 1840s; 1850s
- See also: Other events of 1831; History of Germany • Timeline • Years

Events from the year 1831 in Germany

== Incumbents ==
- Kingdom of Prussia
  - Monarch – Frederick William III (16 November 1797 – 7 June 1840)
- Kingdom of Bavaria
  - Monarch - Ludwig I (1825–1848)
- Kingdom of Saxony
  - Anthony (5 May 1827 – 6 June 1836)
- Kingdom of Hanover
  - William IV (26 June 1830 to 1837)
- Kingdom of Württemberg
  - William (1816–1864)

== Events ==
- 2 May - The Polytechnic Institute, today's Leibniz University Hanover established. Founded on 2 May 1831, it is one of the largest and oldest science and technology universities in Germany.

== Births ==
- 7 January – Heinrich von Stephan, German postal union organizer (d. 1897)
- 26 January – Heinrich Anton de Bary, German botanist, mycologist (d. 1888)
- 24 February – Leo von Caprivi, Chancellor of Germany (d. 1899)
- 8 September – Wilhelm Raabe, German novelist (d. 1910)
- 18 September – Siegfried Marcus, German-born automobile pioneer (d. 1898)
- 6 October – Richard Dedekind, German mathematician (d. 1916)
- 18 October – Frederick III, German Emperor (d. 1888)

== Deaths ==
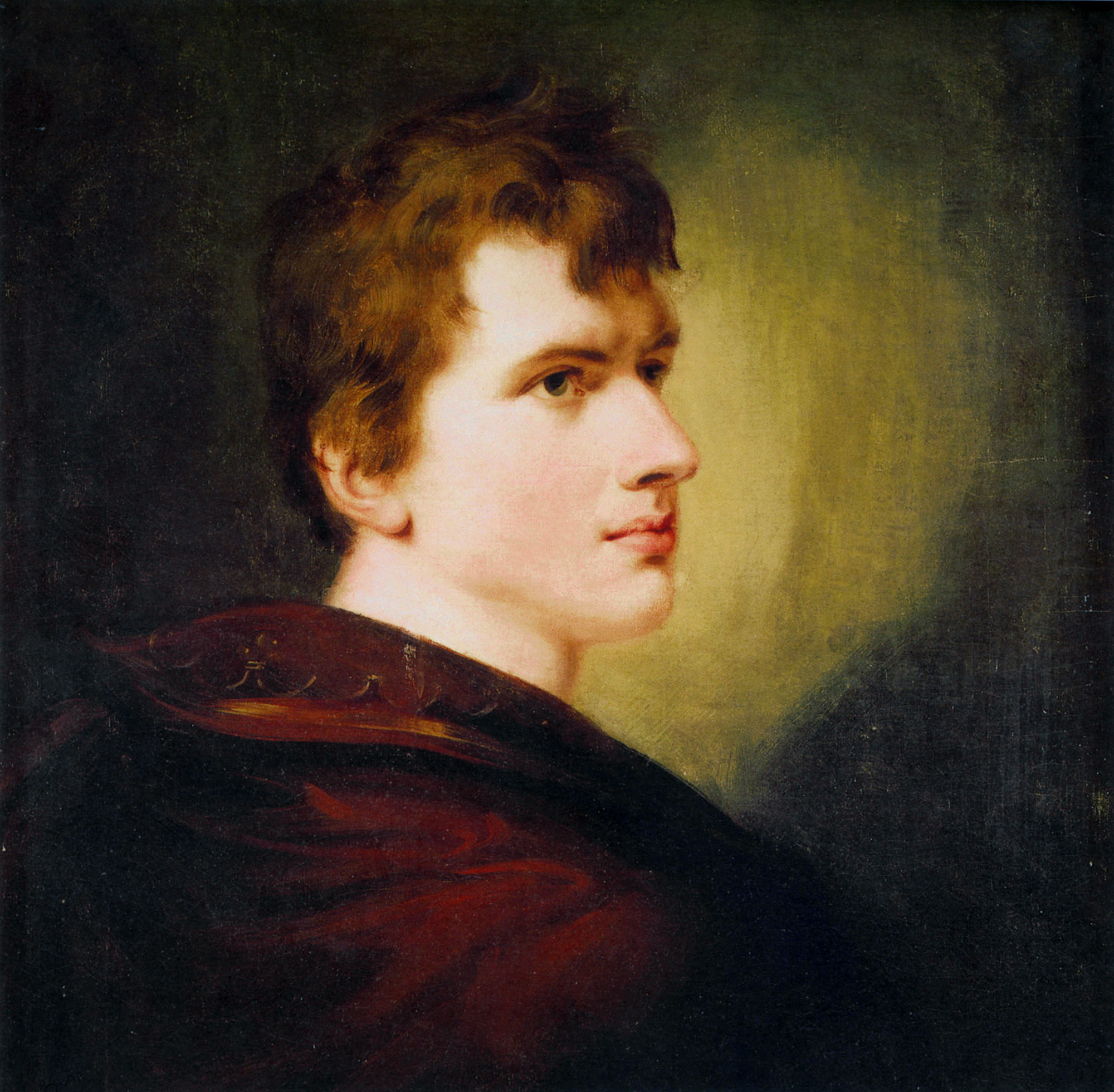
Ludwig Achim von Arnim

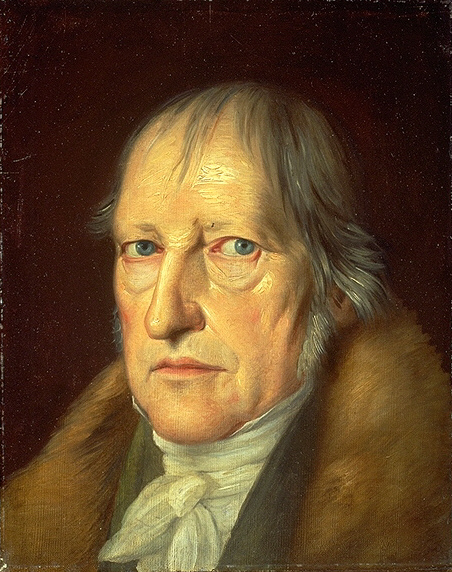
Georg Hegel

- 21 January – Ludwig Achim von Arnim, German poet (b. 1781)
- 17 February – Friedrich Wilhelm, Duke of Schleswig-Holstein-Sonderburg-Glücksburg (b. 1785)
- 25 February – Friedrich Maximilian Klinger, German dramatist and novelist, originator of Sturm und Drang (born 1752)
- 5 August – Sébastien Érard, German-born French instrument maker (b. 1752)
- 24 August – August von Gneisenau, Prussian field marshal (b. 1760)
- 28 September – Philippine Engelhard, German writer, scholar (b. 1756)
- 14 November – Georg Hegel, German philosopher (b. 1770)
- 16 November – Carl von Clausewitz, German military strategist (b. 1780)
