= Ludwig Simon =

German lawyer and politician

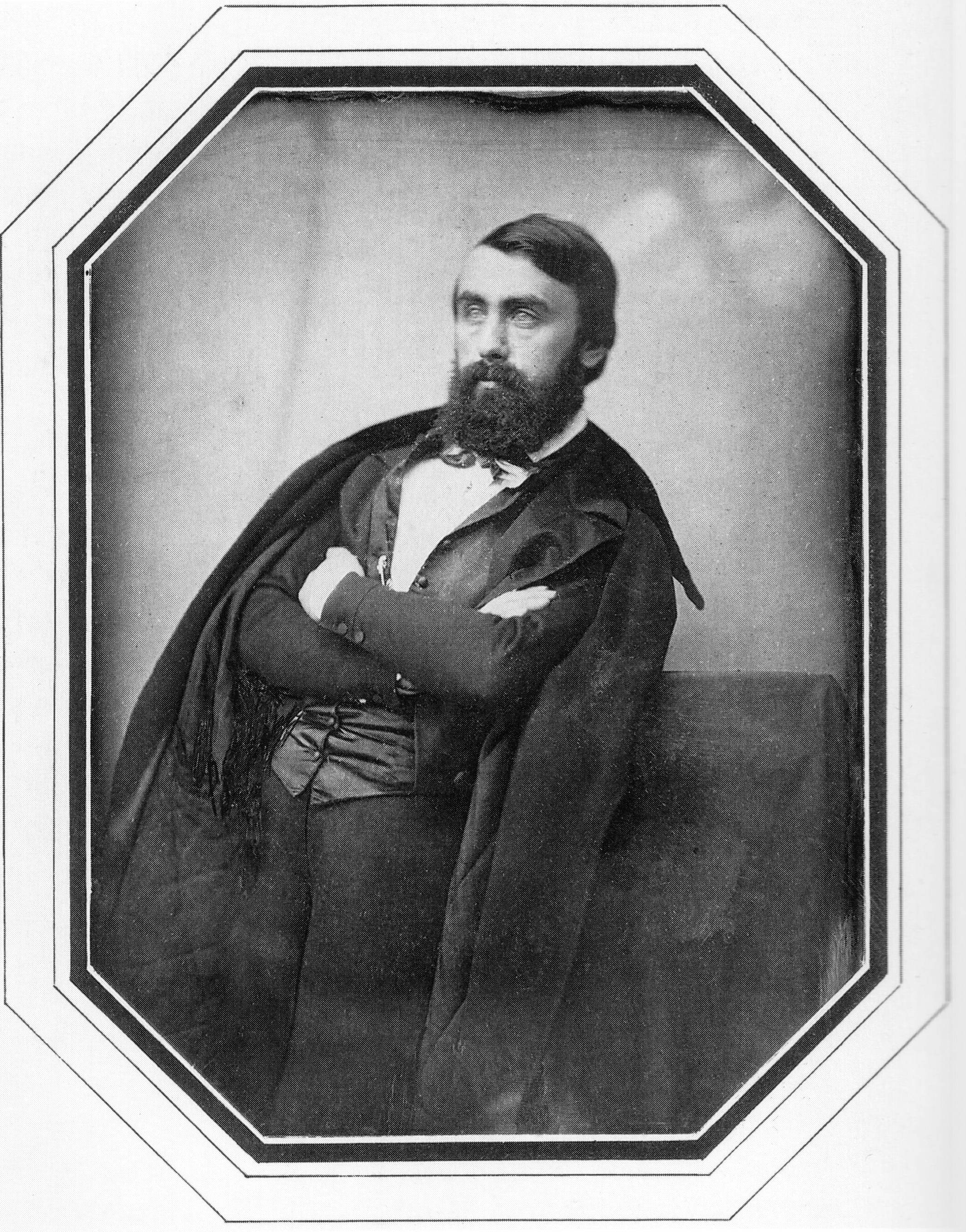
Simon in 1848.

Ludwig Simon was born in 1819. He became a lawyer in the town of Trier in the Rhineland of Germany. Known for his democratic beliefs, Simon was elected to the Frankfurt National Assembly in 1848 and 1849. In that assembly, he joined the "left wing" of the democratic group, which included Lorenzo Brentano and Arnold Ruge. Following the dissolution of the Frankfurt Assembly, Simon emigrated to Switzerland. Simon died in 1872.
