= Ulrike Henschke =

German women's rights activist and author

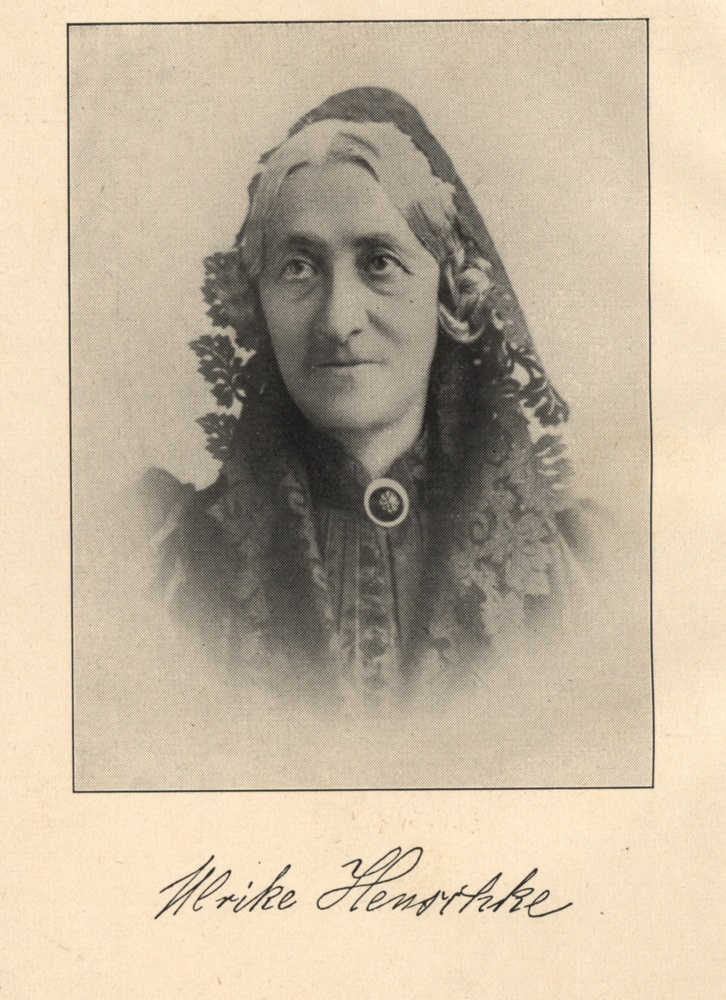
- Born: 24 November 1830; Krotoszyn, Prussia
- Died: 1 November 1897 (aged 66); Baden-Baden, German Empire
- Spouse: Wilhelm Henschke
- Children: Margarete Henschke
- Writing career
- Pen name: Clara Ulrici
- Language: German

Ulrike Henschke (24 November 1830 – 1 November 1897, Baden-Baden) was a German women's rights activist, advocate of secondary and vocational education for women and founder of the Victoria Continuation School, a technical college for women. She was also an accomplished author, including writing the novel Gertrud von Stein under the pseudonym Clara Ulrici.

== Bibliography ==
Ulrike Henschke was born on 24 November 1830 in the town of Krotoszyn in Prussia. She was a member of the Lette-Verein, which strove to expand education across the country, particularly to those who had previously not had the opportunity to receive higher education. Through her work with the society, Henschke set up the "Dienstmädchenfortbildung", or training scheme for domestic servants. Subsequently, she founded the Viktoria-Fortbildungsschule, or Victoria Continuation School, a technical college in Berlin. Opening its doors in 1878, the School was patronised by Crown Princess Victoria. Henschke was appointed the first director and developed a new and comprehensive programme for the students that combined vocational and general education.

Henschke married the President of the Senate of Berlin, Wilhelm Henschke, and had a daughter, Margarete, with whom she co-wrote a textbook on tertiary education. As well as being a respected author of texts on education, she also published the novel Gertrud von Stein under the pseudonym Clara Ulrici, in 1870. Henschke died on 1 November 1897 in Baden-Baden.

== Writing ==
- Die Bedeutung des Vereinslebens für die Frauen ("The Importance of Associational Life for Women"). 1866.
- (under the pseudonym Clara Ulrici) Gertrud von Stein. 1870.
- Zur Frauenunterrichtsfrage in Preussen ("On the Question of Women's Education in Prussia"). 1870.
- Denkschrift über das weibliche Fortbildungsschulwesen in Deutschland ("Memorandum on the Women's Higher Education School System in Germany"). 1893.
- (with Margarete Henschke) Lehrbuch für weiblich Fortbildungsschulen ("A Textbook for Women's Advanced Training Schools"). 1898.
- Miss Archer. Gedächtnissrede gehalten am 18. April 1883 im Hörsaal des Viktoria-Lyceums. ("Miss Archer: A Commemorative Speech given on April 18, 1883 in the Lecture Hall of the Victoria Lyceum") Springer, Berlin 1884.
