= Karl Christian Tittmann =

German theologian

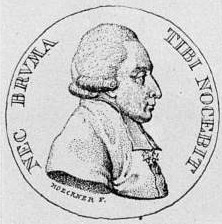
Medal from 1817 on the 50th anniversary of Tittmann's service

Karl Christian Tittmann (born 20 August 1744 in Großbardau; died 6 December 1820 in Dresden) was a German Evangelical Lutheran theologian.

== Biography ==
Karl Christian Tittmann was the son of pastor Karl Christian Tittmann. In 1756 he attended the Princely School Grimma and graduated from the University of Leipzig in 1762. With the support of Johann August Ernesti, in 1766 he acquired master's degree. In the following year, he took a position as a catechist at the Peterskirche in Leipzig and in 1770 a position as deacon in Langensalza.

In 1773 Tittmann wrote the “Tractatus de vestigiis Gnosticorum in Novo Test. Frusta quaesitis“ (Leipzig). On 3 June 1775 he was appointed professor at the theological faculty at the University of Wittenberg. At the same time he took over the office of provost at the Wittenberg Castle Church and was a member of the Wittenberg consistory as a consistorial councilor.

In 1784 he was promoted to first professor, senior pastor at the town church and general superintendent of the Saxon spa district. From 1803 he was pastor and superintendent of Dresden until his death, and was buried in the council crypt of the Elias cemetery (as were his sons Karl August Tittmann and Friedrich Wilhelm Tittmann later on).
