= Louis I of Baden =

Grand Duke of Baden from 1818 to 1830

Louis I
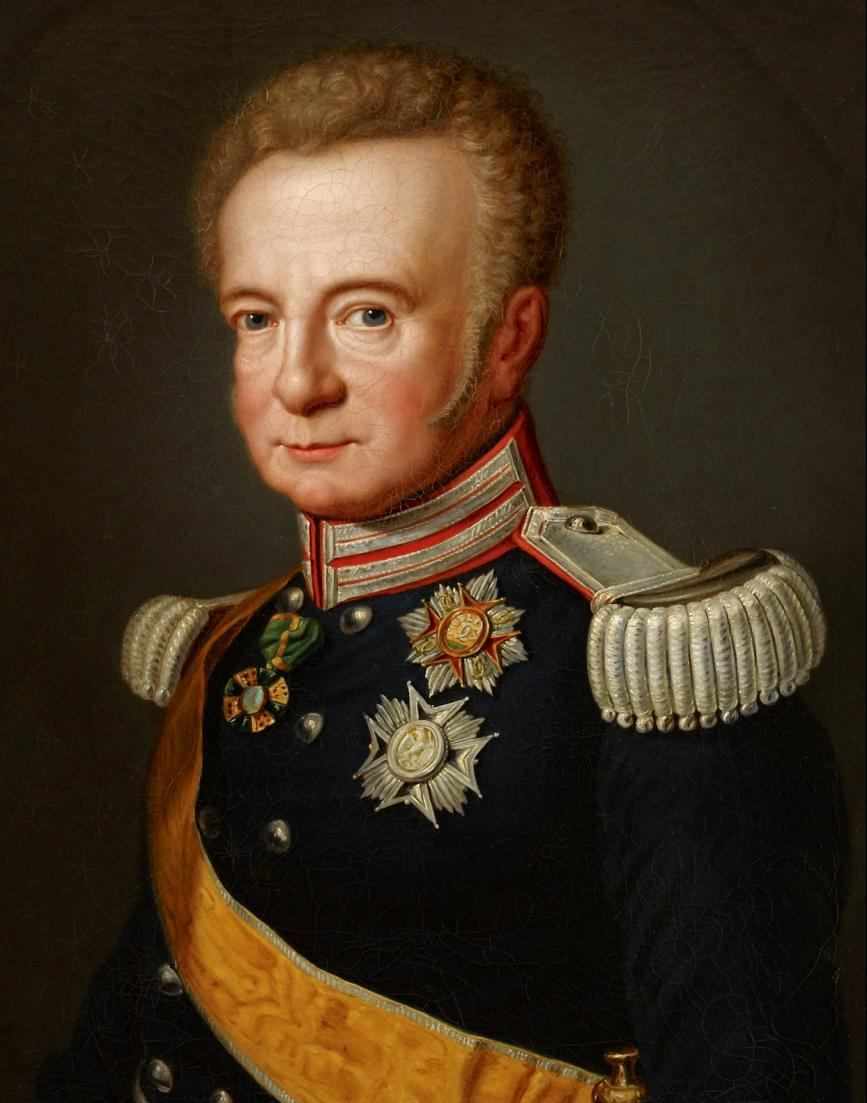
- Portrait of Louis I (early 19th century)

Grand Duke of Baden
- Reign: 8 December 1818 – 30 March 1830
- Predecessor: Charles I
- Successor: Leopold I
- Born: 9 February 1763; Karlsruhe
- Died: 30 March 1830 (aged 67); Karlsruhe
- Issue: Countess Louise von Langenstein und Gondelsheim (illegitimate daughter)
- House: Zähringen
- Father: Charles Frederick, Grand Duke of Baden
- Mother: Landgravine Caroline Louise of Hesse-Darmstadt
- Religion: Lutheranism

Ludwig I (9 February 1763 – 30 March 1830) succeeded as Grand Duke of Baden on 8 December 1818. He was the uncle of his predecessor Karl Ludwig Friedrich, and his death marked the end of the Zähringen line of the House of Baden. He was succeeded by his half brother, Leopold.

He secured the continued existence of the University of Freiburg in 1820, after which the university was called the Albert-Ludwig University. He also founded the Polytechnic Hochschule Karlsruhe in 1825. The Hochschule is the oldest technical school in Germany.

Ludwig's death in 1830 led to many rumors. His death also meant the extinction of his line of the Baden family. The succession then went to the children of the morganatic second marriage of Grand Duke Karl Friedrich and Louise Karoline Geyer von Geyersberg, who was created Countess of Hochberg in the Austrian nobility at the personal request of Karl Friedrich.

After Ludwig's death, there was much discussion about a mysterious seventeen-year-old man named Kaspar Hauser, who had appeared seemingly out of nowhere in 1828. Seventeen years previously, the first son of the future Grand Duke Karl and his French wife Stéphanie de Beauharnais died under what were later portrayed as mysterious circumstances. There was at the time and still is today (in 2007) speculation that Hauser, who died (perhaps murdered) in 1833, was that child.

Working together with architect Friedrich Weinbrenner, Ludwig is responsible for most of the classical revival buildings in the city center and for building the pyramid.

Ludwig had one surviving illegitimate daughter by his mistress Katharina Werner (created Countess of Langenstein and Gondelsheim in 1818), Countess Louise von Langenstein und Gondelsheim (1825–1900) who married in 1848 Swedish aristocrat Carl Israel, Count Douglas (1824–1898).

== Ancestry ==
Ancestors of Louis I of Baden

8. Charles III William, Margrave of Baden-Durlach
4. Frederick, Hereditary Prince of Baden-Durlach
9. Duchess Magdalena Wilhelmine of Württemberg
2. Charles Frederick, Grand Duke of Baden
10. John William Friso, Prince of Orange
5. Princess Amalia of Nassau-Dietz
11. Landgravine Marie Louise of Hesse-Kassel
1. Louis, Grand Duke of Baden
12. Ernest Louis, Landgrave of Hesse-Darmstadt
6. Louis VIII, Landgrave of Hesse-Darmstadt
13. Margravine Dorothea Charlotte of Brandenburg-Ansbach
3. Landgravine Caroline Louise of Hesse-Darmstadt
14. Johann Reinhard III of Hanau-Lichtenberg
7. Countess Charlotte of Hanau-Lichtenberg
15. Margravine Dorothea Friederike of Brandenburg-Ansbach

Louis I of Baden House of Zähringen Born: February 9 1763 Died: March 30 1830
Regnal titles
Preceded by Karl	Grand Duke of Baden; 1818–1830	Succeeded by Leopold
