= Charles II of Brunswick =

Charles II
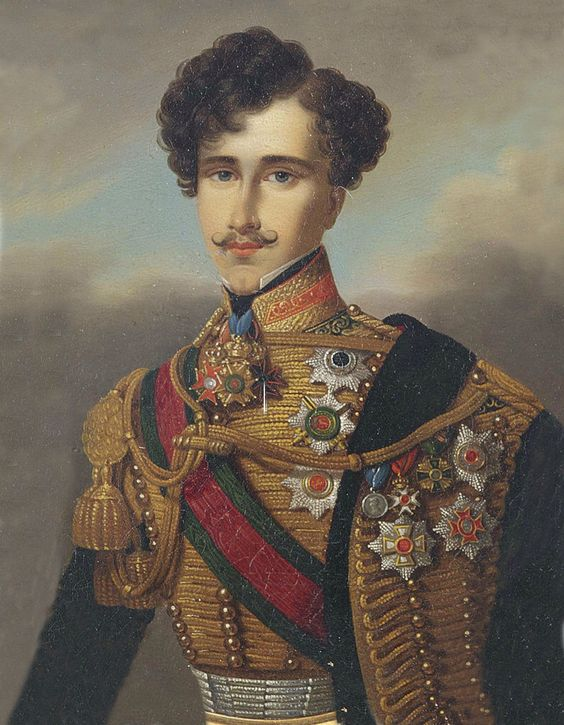
- Portrait c. 1825–1830

Duke of Brunswick
- Reign: 16 June 1815 – 9 September 1830
- Predecessor: Frederick William
- Successor: William
- Born: 30 October 1804; Brunswick, Brunswick-Wolfenbüttel
- Died: 19 August 1873 (aged 68); Geneva, Switzerland
Names
- Charles Frederick Augustus William; German: Karl Friedrich August Wilhelm
- House: House of Brunswick-Bevern
- Father: Frederick William, Duke of Brunswick-Wolfenbüttel
- Mother: Princess Marie of Baden

Charles II, Duke of Brunswick (German: Karl II, Herzog von Braunschweig; 30 October 1804 – 18 August 1873), ruled the Duchy of Brunswick from 1815 until 1830. He was defeated by American Paul Morphy in one of the most famous chess games ever played, the "Opera Game".

== Biography ==
Charles was born in Brunswick, the eldest son of Frederick William, Duke of Brunswick-Lüneburg. In April 1808, his mother, Princess Marie of Baden (1782–1808), died shortly after giving birth to a stillborn daughter when Charles was only three years old. Charles and his younger brother William, went to live with their maternal grandmother, Princess Amalie of Hesse-Darmstadt, in Glückstadt, while his father raised a volunteer corps, the Black Brunswickers, to fight with the Austrians against Napoleon. In the Autumn of 1809, to avoid capture the duke had conducted a remarkable fighting march across Germany and escaped to Britain with his troops; on his arrival in London he sent for his sons who then lived with their paternal grandmother, Princess Augusta of Great Britain at Blackheath and later at Vauxhall. The young princes were treated as celebrities in London, with William being given the honour of laying a foundation stone for Vauxhall Bridge in 1814.

After the death of his father in 1815, Charles inherited the Duchy of Brunswick, but since he was still underage, he was put under the guardianship of George, the prince regent of the United Kingdom and the Kingdom of Hanover. When Charles neared his 18th birthday, a dispute over the date of his majority erupted; Charles claimed majority at the age of 18, while George considered the age of majority to be 21 years. A compromise was made, and Charles reached his majority at the age of 19, and took over government on 30 October 1823.

During his 18th year, Hanover speedily rushed in a new constitution which limited his powers, redefined his duchy, hereditary lands, and his due income as head of the House of Welf. As from 1546 forwards Hanover also paid the dynastic fidei commis payments to the Wolfenbüttel princes, as heads of house. Until this new redefinition, all of Hanover was considered sub-principalities that conditionally governed in the name of the Wolfenbüttel ruling prince. These sub-principalities included Hanover-Calenberg and Luneburg, the new Congress of Vienna creation of the Kingdom of Hanover in 1814 notwithstanding.

On May 10, 1827, Charles declared in an edict that the new constitution redefining his sovereignty was invalid. Passing a new constitution during a Regency was also protested for him by Austria. These had gone against all the norms of international law. In the edict Hanover was called a "usurper", and this caused outrage in Hanover and England. The German Confederation that same year attempted to intervene in this matter and ordered Charles to accept the new constitution from his minority. Charles disregarded it, and continued governing as his father had. He did not have his decrees cosigned, but continued as an absolute monarch, as the Guelphs had been for more than 1,000 years.

The ownership of the printing presses ultimately won the battle as the popular opinion was turned against their monarch. Charles's administration was maligned as being corrupt and misguided. When in 1830 the July Revolution broke out, Charles happened to be in Paris. He hurriedly returned to Brunswick, where he announced his intention to suppress all revolutionary tendencies by force. But on 6 September, he was attacked by stone throwers while riding home from the theatre; on the next day, a large mob tried to break into the palace. Charles fled the Duchy (7 September) and the palace was completely destroyed by fire. When Charles's brother, William, arrived in Brunswick on 10 September, he was received joyfully by the people. William originally considered himself only his brother's regent. On 2 December the German Diet declared Charles II incapable of governing and at its urging, William declared himself ruling duke on 25 April 1831.

Charles made several desperate attempts to depose his brother by diplomacy and by force, but they were unsuccessful. Charles continued to be active as exiled ruling prince. He filed many protests against Hanover, against his brother, and against Prussia's annexation of the Kingdom of Hanover after the 1866 Austro-Prussian War. In his later letters he predicted communism would take the lands from the Prussians.

Charles spent the rest of his life outside of Germany, mostly in Paris and London. While he lived in London he engaged in a high-profile feud with the publisher Barnard Gregory due to articles published about the Duke in The Satirist. After the war between France and Germany broke out, he moved to Geneva, where he died in the Beau-Rivage Hotel in 1873, aged 68.

== Brunswick Monument ==
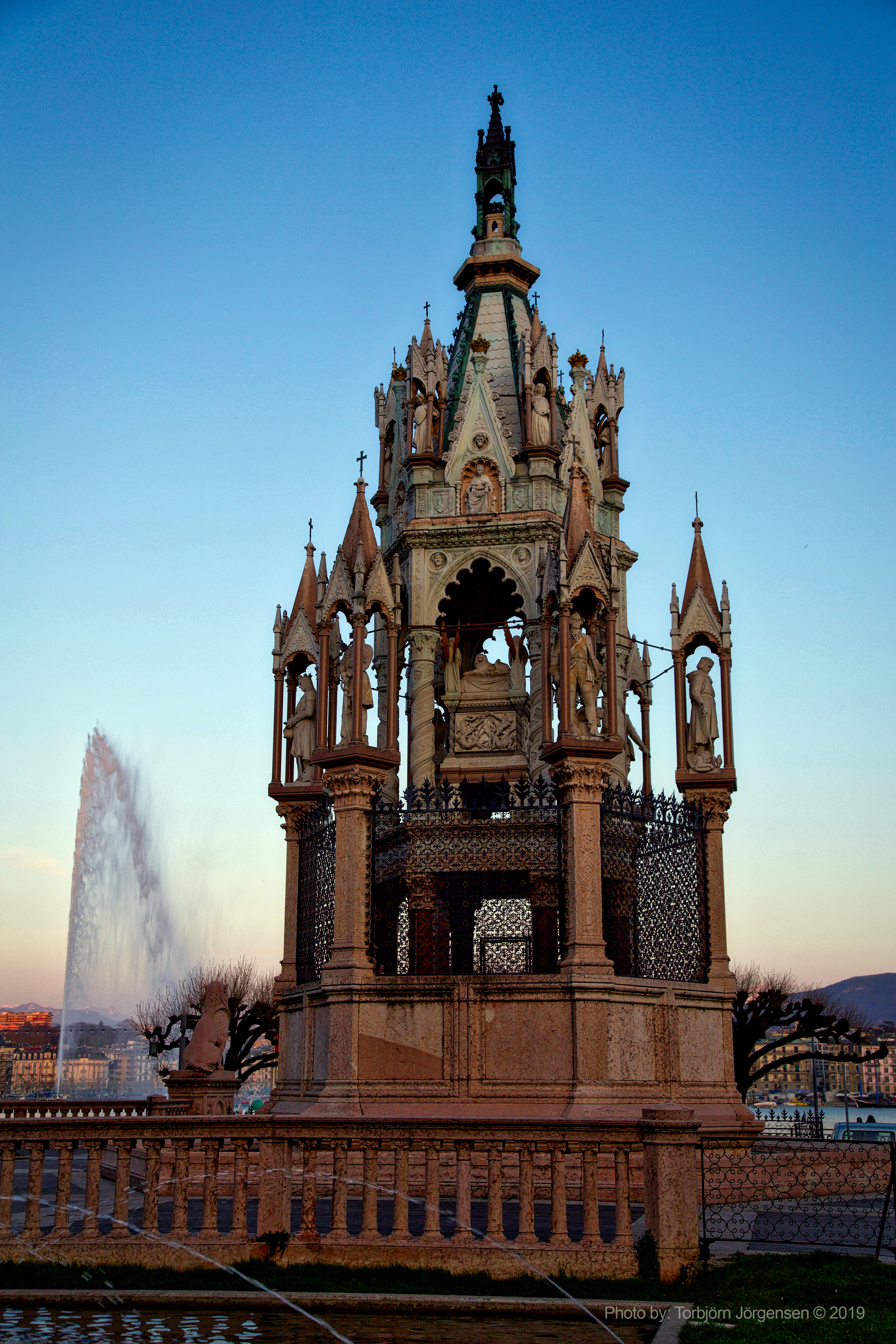
The Brunswick Monument on the Quai du Mont-Blanc, Geneva

In his will drawn up on 5 March 1871, Charles left his entire estate to the city of Geneva with a single stipulation: that a mausoleum be built for him in Geneva "in a prominent position and worthy", that it should feature statues of his father, Frederick William, and his grandfather, Charles William Ferdinand, and that it should imitate the style of the 14th century Scaliger Tombs in Verona. Accordingly, a design was chosen by the Swiss architect Jean Franel. Sited on the Quai du Mont-Blanc, it is built in three storeys of white marble with a hexagonal canopy over a sarcophagus bearing a recumbent figure of the duke. At the projecting corners are marble statues of six notable ancestors of the House of Guelph by various sculptors, and a bronze equestrian statue of Duke William by the French sculptor Auguste Cain was originally mounted at the top of the spire. The monument stands on a platform 65 meters long and 25 meters wide and is guarded by marble chimeras and lions, also by Cain.

The monument was unveiled on 14 October 1879; however, earthquake damage resulted in the removal of the equestrian statue to an adjacent plinth in 1883 and the top of the spire was rebuilt with a crown in 1890. The Duke's estate amounted to 24 million Swiss Francs, two million of which were expended on the monument, the remainder was spent on a number of new public buildings, for example the Grand Théâtre.

== Legacy ==
A contemporary obituarist referred to the Duke as "that painted, bewigged Lothario, whose follies, eccentricities, and diamonds made him the talk of Europe." During his lifetime he sued several newspaper publishers for libel when they alleged that, among other things, he solicited homosexual encounters. However, in 1849 he won a defamation case for the publication of an article by a newspaper, The Weekly Dispatch, in 1830, after sending a manservant to procure archive copies of the edition from the publishers and the British Museum. No copies now survive, although given the Duke's other legal cases, the nature of the libel may be assumed. However this case (Brunswick v Harmer) established a precedent in English defamation law, as the ruling was interpreted by courts to allow defamation plaintiffs to sue if there was a “new publication” of the original libel. It was used, for example, in 2009 to decree that internet company Google, who made historical libels available on their web pages, could be liable for damages. The multiple publication rule was finally curtailed in the UK by The Defamation Act 2013.

He had some natural children, including Elisabeth, mother of Frederic de Civry.

== Ancestors ==
Ancestors of Charles II of Brunswick

8. Charles I, Duke of Brunswick-Wolfenbüttel
4. Charles William Ferdinand, Duke of Brunswick
9. Princess Philippine Charlotte of Prussia
2. Frederick William, Duke of Brunswick-Wolfenbüttel
10. Frederick, Prince of Wales
5. Princess Augusta of Great Britain
11. Princess Augusta of Saxe-Gotha
1. Charles II, Duke of Brunswick
12. Charles Frederick, Grand Duke of Baden
6. Charles Louis, Hereditary Prince of Baden
13. Landgravine Karoline Luise of Hesse-Darmstadt
3. Princess Marie of Baden
14. Louis IX, Landgrave of Hesse-Darmstadt
7. Landgravine Amalie of Hesse-Darmstadt
15. Countess Palatine Caroline of Zweibrücken

Charles II of Brunswick House of Brunswick-Bevern Cadet branch of the House of Welf Born: 30 October 1804 Died: 18 August 1873
Regnal titles
Preceded by Frederick William	Duke of Brunswick; 1815–1830	Succeeded by William VIII
