= Charles Frederick, Grand Duke of Saxe-Weimar-Eisenach =

Charles Frederick
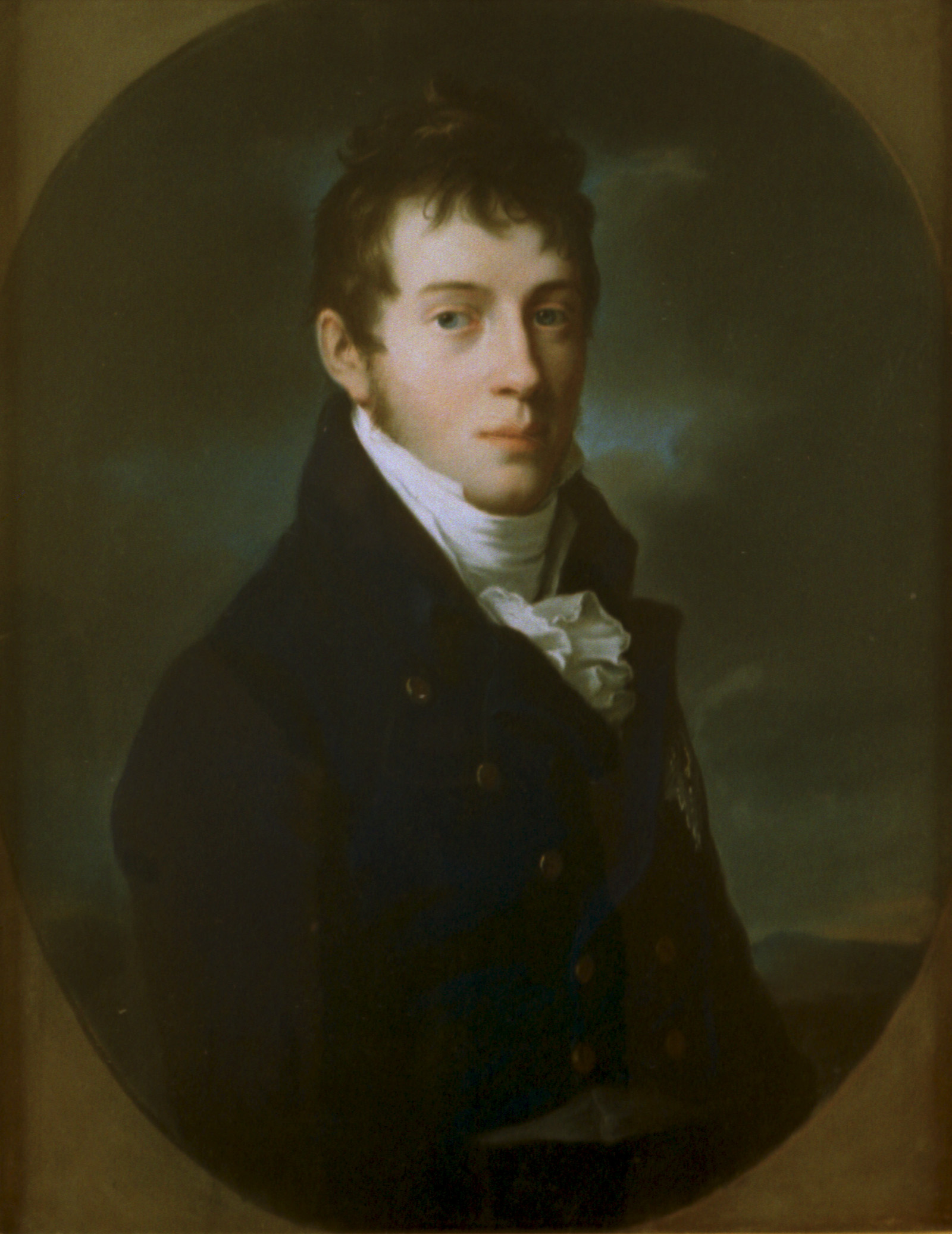
- Portrait by Johann Friedrich August Tischbein, 1804

Grand Duke of Saxe-Weimar-Eisenach
- Reign: 14 June 1828 — 8 July 1853
- Predecessor: Charles Augustus
- Successor: Charles Alexander
- Born: 2 February 1783; Weimar
- Died: 8 July 1853 (aged 70); Schloss Belvedere, Weimar
- Burial: Weimarer Fürstengruft
- Spouse: Grand Duchess Maria Pavlovna of Russia (m. 1804)
- Issue: Prince Charles; Marie, Princess Charles of Prussia; Augusta, German Empress; Charles Alexander, Grand Duke of Saxe-Weimar-Eisenach
- House: Saxe-Weimar-Eisenach
- Father: Charles Augustus, Grand Duke of Saxe-Weimar-Eisenach
- Mother: Princess Louisa of Hesse-Darmstadt

Charles Frederick (German: Karl Friedrich; 2 February 1783 – 8 July 1853) was the reigning Grand Duke of Saxe-Weimar-Eisenach.

== Biography ==
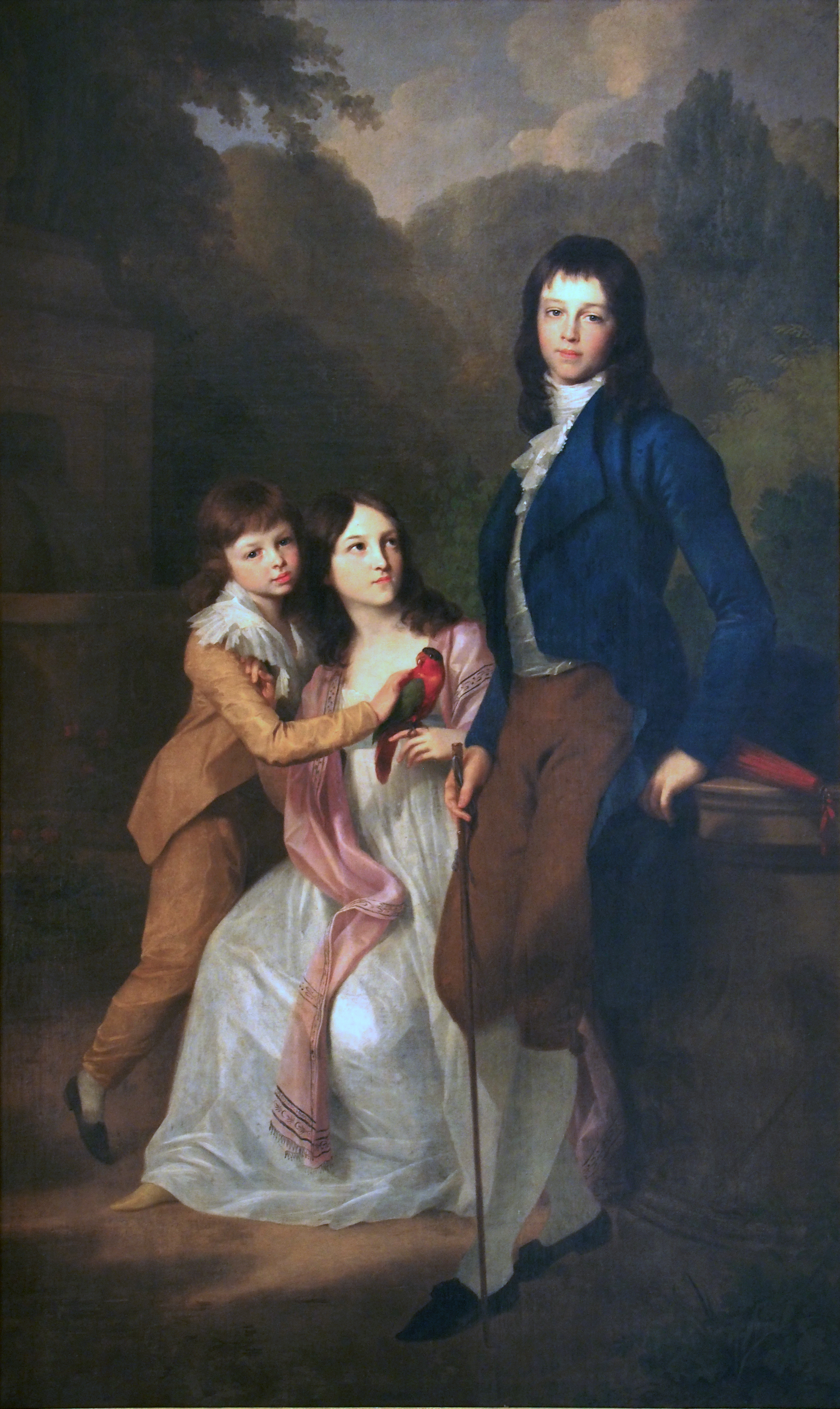
Charles Frederick (right) with his sister Caroline Louise (center) and brother Bernhard (left), painted by Johann Friedrich August Tischbein, 1798

Born in Weimar, he was the eldest son of Charles Augustus, Grand Duke of Saxe-Weimar-Eisenach and Luise Auguste of Hesse-Darmstadt.

Charles Frederick succeeded his father as Grand Duke when the latter died in 1828. His capital, Weimar, continued to be a cultural center of Central Europe, even after the death of Goethe in 1832. Johann Nepomuk Hummel made his career in Weimar as Kapellmeister until he died in 1837. Franz Liszt settled in Weimar in 1848 as Kapellmeister and gathered about him a circle that kept the Weimar court a major musical centre. Due to the intervention of Liszt, the composer Richard Wagner found refuge in Weimar after he was forced to flee Saxony for his role in the revolutionary disturbances there in 1848-49. Wagner's opera Lohengrin was first performed in Weimar in August 1850.

Charles Frederick died at Schloss Belvedere, Weimar, in 1853 and was buried in the Weimarer Fürstengruft.

== Family and children ==
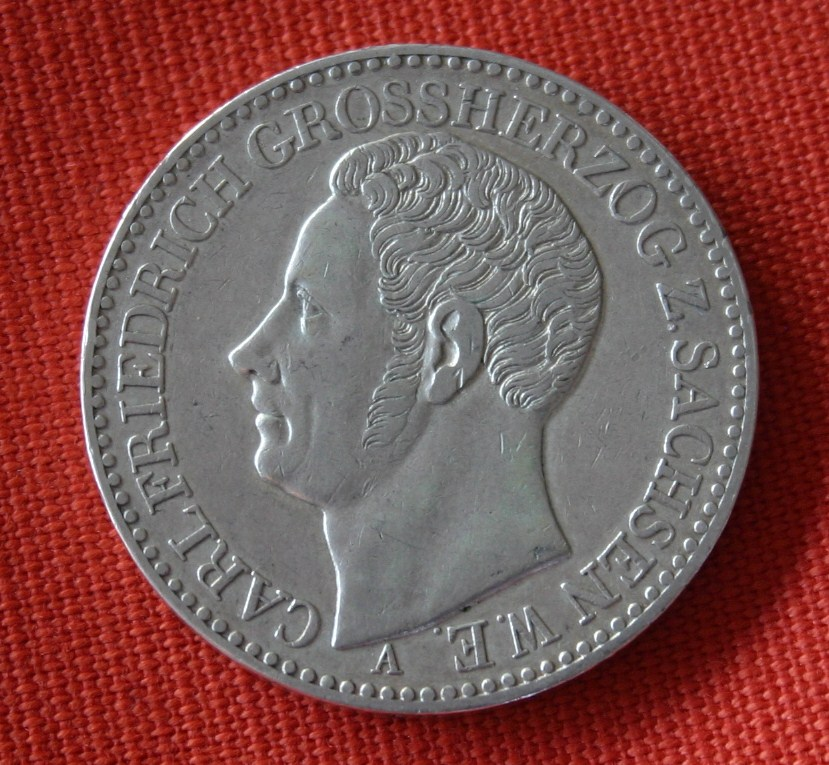
Obverse of a Charles Frederick thaler, 1841.

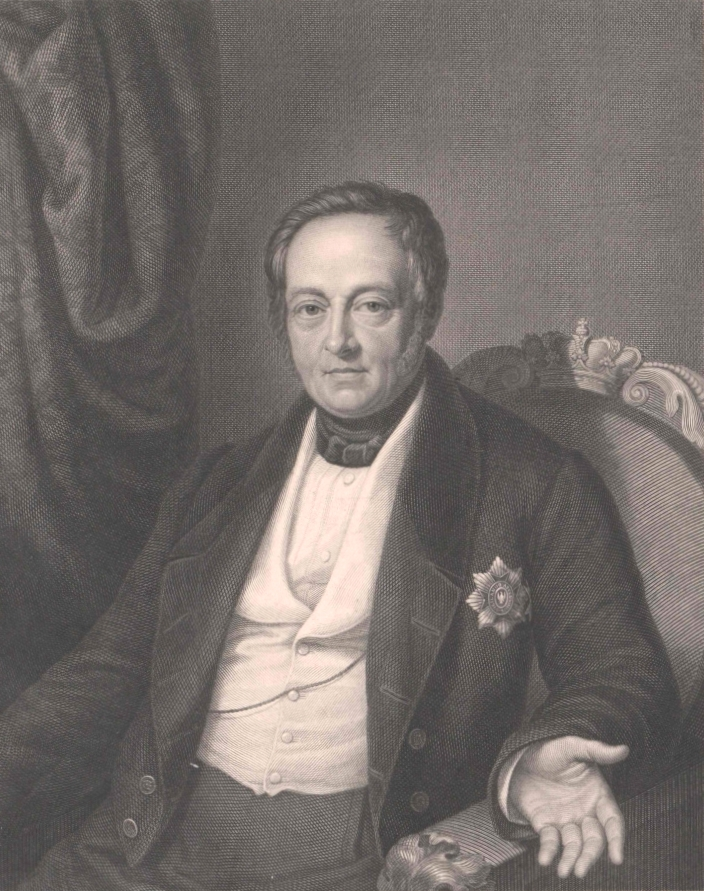
Charles Frederick in his later years

In St. Petersburg on 3 August 1804, Charles Frederick married the Grand Duchess Maria Pavlovna of Russia, daughter of Emperor Paul I. They had four children:

- Paul Alexander Karl Constantin Frederick August (b. Weimar, 25 September 1805 – d. Weimar, 10 April 1806).
- Marie Luise Alexandrine (b. Weimar, 3 February 1808 – d. Berlin, 18 January 1877), married on 26 May 1827 to Karl of Prussia.
- Marie Luise Augusta Katharine (b. Weimar, 30 September 1811 – d. Berlin, 7 January 1890), married on 11 June 1829 to Wilhelm of Prussia, who became Wilhelm I, German Emperor.
- Karl Alexander August Johann, Grand Duke of Saxe-Weimar-Eisenach (b. Weimar, 24 June 1818 – d. Weimar, 5 January 1901), married on 8 October 1842 to Sophie of the Netherlands.

== Ancestry ==
Ancestors of Charles Frederick, Grand Duke of Saxe-Weimar-Eisenach

8. Ernest Augustus I, Duke of Saxe-Weimar-Eisenach
4. Ernest Augustus II, Duke of Saxe-Weimar-Eisenach
9. Margravine Sophie Charlotte of Brandenburg-Bayreuth
2. Charles Augustus, Grand Duke of Saxe-Weimar-Eisenach
10. Charles I, Duke of Brunswick-Wolfenbüttel
5. Duchess Anna Amalia of Brunswick-Wolfenbüttel
11. Princess Philippine Charlotte of Prussia
1. Charles Frederick, Grand Duke of Saxe-Weimar-Eisenach
12. Louis VIII, Landgrave of Hesse-Darmstadt
6. Louis IX, Landgrave of Hesse-Darmstadt
13. Countess Charlotte of Hanau-Lichtenberg
3. Princess Louise of Hesse-Darmstadt
14. Christian III, Count Palatine of Zweibrücken
7. Countess Palatine Caroline of Zweibrücken
15. Countess Caroline of Nassau-Saarbrücken

Regnal titles
Preceded by Karl August	Grand Duke of Saxe-Weimar-Eisenach; 1828–1853	Succeeded by Karl Alexander
