= 1899 in Germany =

- Decades: 1870s; 1880s; 1890s; 1900s; 1910s
- See also: Other events of 1899; History of Germany • Timeline • Years

Events in the year 1899 in Germany.

== Incumbents ==
=== National level ===
- Emperor – Wilhelm II
- Chancellor – Chlodwig, Prince of Hohenlohe-Schillingsfürst

=== State level ===
==== Kingdoms ====
- King of Bavaria – Otto
- King of Prussia – Wilhelm II
- King of Saxony – Albert
- King of Württemberg – William II

==== Grand Duchies ====
- Grand Duke of Baden – Frederick I
- Grand Duke of Hesse – Ernest Louis
- Grand Duke of Mecklenburg-Schwerin – Frederick Francis IV
- Grand Duke of Mecklenburg-Strelitz – Frederick William
- Grand Duke of Oldenburg – Peter II
- Grand Duke of Saxe-Weimar-Eisenach – Charles Alexander

==== Principalities ====
- Schaumburg-Lippe – George, Prince of Schaumburg-Lippe
- Schwarzburg-Rudolstadt – Günther Victor, Prince of Schwarzburg-Rudolstadt
- Schwarzburg-Sondershausen – Karl Günther, Prince of Schwarzburg-Sondershausen
- Principality of Lippe – Alexander, Prince of Lippe (with Ernest II, Count of Lippe-Biesterfeld as regent)
- Reuss Elder Line – Heinrich XXII, Prince Reuss of Greiz
- Reuss Younger Line – Heinrich XIV, Prince Reuss Younger Line
- Waldeck and Pyrmont – Friedrich, Prince of Waldeck and Pyrmont

==== Duchies ====
- Duke of Anhalt – Frederick I, Duke of Anhalt
- Duke of Brunswick – Prince Albert of Prussia (regent)
- Duke of Saxe-Altenburg – Ernst I, Duke of Saxe-Altenburg
- Duke of Saxe-Coburg and Gotha – Alfred, Duke of Saxe-Coburg and Gotha
- Duke of Saxe-Meiningen – Georg II, Duke of Saxe-Meiningen

==== Colonial Governors ====
- Cameroon (Kamerun) – Jesko von Puttkamer (6th term)
- Kiaochow (Kiautschou) – Carl Rosendahl to 19 February, then Otto Jäschke
- German East Africa (Deutsch-Ostafrika) – Eduard von Liebert
- German New Guinea (Deutsch-Neuguinea) – Hugo Skopnik (Landeshauptleute of the German New Guinea Company) to 31 March, then Rudolf von Bennigsen (governor)
- German South-West Africa (Deutsch-Südwestafrika) – Theodor Leutwein
- Togoland – August Köhler

== Events ==
- 12 February – German-Spanish Treaty
- 14 March – Kaiser Wilhelm II takes direct command of the Imperial Navy.
- 16 March – Memorial ceremonies are held for the burial of the late German hero Otto von Bismarck and his wife, Johanna von Puttkamer with their re-interment at the Bismarck Mausoleum, a modern-day tourist attraction at Friedrichsruh in Aumühle. Bismarck, who had died on July 30 last, had been buried along with his wife at the estate of his home in Varzin, the modern-day city of Warcino in Poland.
- 1 April – The German Imperial Army is expanded with the establishment of the XIX (2nd Royal Saxon) Corps, the XVIII Corps and the 37th, 38th, 39th and 40th Divisions.
- 2 April – The Hamburg America Line cruise ship SS Graf Waldersee begins its maiden voyage.
- 4 April – Warship SMS Jaguar, which will be scuttled after losing the 1914 Siege of Tsingtao, begins service.
- 18 April – Cargo ship SS Saxonia launched.
- 1 June – Battleship SMS Kaiser Wilhelm der Grosse launched.
- 18 July – Light cruiser SMS Niobe launched.
- 19 August – A bill to construct the proposed Dortmund-Rhine Canal in Germany fails overwhelmingly in the lower house of parliament.
- 20 September – Ocean liner SS Rhein launched.
- 9–14 October – The Hanover Congress of the Social Democratic Party of Germany is held.
- 18 October – Battleship SMS Kaiser Karl der Grosse launched.
- 18 October – Battleship SMS Wörth launched.
- 25 November – Transport ship SS Hamburg launched.
- 2 December:
  - The Tripartite Convention, which brings an end to the Samoan Civil War by dividing the islands between Germany and the United States of America, is signed by Germany, the United States and the United Kingdom, pursuant to which the colony of German Samoa in established in 1900.
  - Transport ship SS Grosser Kurfürst, launched.
- 5 December – Germany's cabinet agrees to repeal a Prussian law that had prohibited the creation of political societies or clubs.
- 11 December – Secretary of State for Foreign Affairs Bernhard von Bülow delivers his 'hammer and anvil' speech to the Reichstag calling for Germany to continue its drive to becoming one of the world's greatest powers. The speech was greeted with rapture from the right and anger from the left.
- 31 December – The German government and Kaiser Wilhelm II declare that the 20th century will begin on 1 January 1900. In most of the world the 19th century also includes 1900.

=== Undated ===
- The political career of future Chancellor Wilhelm Marx of the Centre Party begins when he is elected to the Prussian Landtag.
- The German–Spanish Treaty is signed, ending the interests of Spain in the Pacific Ocean and ensuring German control of the Caroline Islands, the Mariana Islands and Palau.
- Max Wolf and Friedrich Karl Arnold Schwassmann discover the asteroids 442 Eichsfeldia, 443 Photographica, 446 Aeternitas, 447 Valentine, 448 Natalie, 449 Hamburga and 450 Brigitta at the University of Heidelberg.
- The chemist Felix Hoffmann patents the drug aspirin.
- Deutsche Orient-Gesellschaft began archaeological excavations of Babylon.
- The 80 cm refracting telescope is completed at Potsdam Observatory.
- Biologist Ernst Haeckel published his Kunstformen der Natur.
- Two ships of the Victoria Louise class of protected cruiser are commissioned—the lead ship of the class SMS Victoria Louise in February and SMS Vineta in September.
- The ocean liner SS Köln is launched.
- The automotive company Hella is established under the name Westfälische Metall-Industrie Aktien-Gesellschaft.
- The Horch car company is established at Ehrenfeld (Cologne) by August Horch and his partner Salli Herz.

== Popular culture ==
=== Arts ===
- The Vorderasiatisches Museum Berlin was opened.
- Max Liebermann paints the Portrait of the Painter Lovis Corinth

=== Sport ===
- 4 February – SV Werder Bremen is founded.
- 23 February – FC Germania 1899 Mühlhausen is founded.
- 8 March – The Frankfurter Fußball-Club Victoria von 1899 (later Eintracht Frankfurt) is founded.
- 17 April – VfL Osnabrück is founded.
- 1 June – FC Bremerhaven is founded.
- 1 July – Turnverein Hoffenheim (later TSG 1899 Hoffenheim) is founded.
- 21 September – Stuttgarter Kickers founded.
- 29 September – SC Naumburg is founded.
- 1 November – FC Bavaria 1899 München is founded.
- 2 December – Chemnitzer BC is founded.
- Other association football clubs are established include 1. Bockenheimer FC 1899, SC Germania 1899 Bremen, FSV Frankfurt, SC Neukirchen, Sportfreunde Siegen and SV Wiesbaden.
- The Southern German football championship is won by Straßburger FV whilst the Brandenburg football championship is won by BFC Preussen.

== Births ==
- 2 January – Hermann von Oppeln-Bronikowski, equestrian and general (died 1966)
- 3 January – Karl Diebitsch, Nazi uniform designer (died 1985)
- 12 January – Josef Wagner, Nazi Gauleiter (died 1945)
- 13 January – Karl Friedrich Bonhoeffer, chemist (died 1957)
- 14 January – Fritz Bayerlein, general (died 1970)
- 29 January – Heinrich Blücher, poet and philosopher (died 1970)
- 15 February – Ernst Biberstein, SS Officer (died 1986)
- 15 February – Grethe Jürgens, painter associated with the New Objectivity. (died 1981)
- 23 February:
  - Erich Kästner, author (died 1974)
  - Elisabeth Langgässer, author (died 1950)
- 25 February – Leo Weisgerber, linguist (died 1985)
- 28 February – Kurt Freiherr von Liebenstein, Army general (died 1975)
- 1 March – Erich von dem Bach-Zelewski, SS Officer (died 1972)
- 3 March:
  - Eugen Fischer, historian (died 1973)
  - Albert Krebs, Nazi official (died 1974)
- 16 March – Hans Otfried von Linstow, German colonel (died 1944)
- 27 March – Kurt Neubauer, Nazi 'martyr'
- 13 March – Ernst Friedrich Lohndorff, author (died 1976)
- 15 March – Ernst Simon, Jewish educator and religious philosopher (died 1988)
- 16 March – Hans Otfried von Linstow, Army officer (died 1944)
- 23 March – Dora Gerson, actress (died 1943)
- 30 March – Friedrich Panse, psychiatrist (died 1973)
- 31 March – Franz Völker, opera singer (died 1965)
- 4 April – Hillel Oppenheimer, botanist (died 1971)
- 6 April – Peter Adolf Thiessen, physical chemist (died 1990)
- 9 April – Hans Jeschonnek, Luftwaffe officer (died 1943)
- 15 April:
  - Hugo Grau, veterinarian (died 1984)
  - Curtis Bernhardt, film director (died 1981)
- 16 April – Karl Schumm, Olympic diver
- 4 May – Fritz von Opel, German automotive pioneer (died 1971)
- 14 May – Charlotte Auerbach, geneticist (died 1994)
- 17 May – Robert Richter, film producer (died 1972)
- 23 May – Charlotte Riefenstahl, physicist (died 1993)
- 27 May – Hans Brausewetter, film actor (died 1945)
- 12 June – Fritz Albert Lipmann, biochemist (died 1986)
- 22 June – Hans Zehrer, journalist (died 1966)
- 23 June:
  - Gerhard von Schwerin, Army general (died 1980)
  - Paul Schmidt, interpreter (died 1970)
- 25 June – Charlotte von Kirschbaum, theologian (died 1975)
- 3 July – Ludwig Guttmann, neurologist and Paralympic Games founder (died 1980)
- 22 July – Wolfgang Metzger, psychologist (died 1979)
- 23 July – Gustav Heinemann, President of Germany (died 1976)
- 26 July – Hermann Josef Wehrle, German Roman Catholic priest (died 1944)
- 1 August – William Steinberg, conductor (died 1978)
- 12 August – Peter Altmeier, politician (died 1977)
- 14 August – Fritz Schwarz, bobsledder
- 20 August – Hanns Lilje, Lutheran bishop (died 1977)
- 26 August – Wolfgang Krull, mathematician (died 1971)
- 1 September – Karl-Gustav Sauberzweig, Army officer (died 1946)
- 5 September – Georg Leibbrandt, Nazi Party activist (died 1982)
- 13 September – Bolko von Richthofen, archaeologist (died 1983)
- 20 September – Leo Strauss, political philosopher (died 1973)
- 22 September – Veit Harlan, film director and actor (died 1964)
- 23 September – Sigismund-Helmut von Dawans, Wehrmacht general (died 1944)
- 24 September – Siegfried Adolf Kummer, mystic (died 1977)
- 6 October – Hansjoachim von der Esch, explorer (died 1976)
- 10 October – Wilhelm Röpke, economist (died 1966)
- 22 October – Felix Scheder-Bieschin, Olympic sailor (died 1940)
- 7 November – Eberhard Finckh, Army officer (died 1944)
- 10 November – Wessel von Freytag-Loringhoven, Army officer (died 1944)
- 12 November – Wilhelm Lachnit, German painter (died 1962)
- 24 November – Hilmar Wäckerle, commandant of Dachau concentration camp (died 1941)
- 26 November:
  - Bruno Hauptmann, convicted murderer (died 1936)
  - Walter Gerwig, musician (died 1966)
- 4 December – Karl-Günther Heimsoth, physician and polygraph (died 1934)
- 5 December – Wolfgang Kaden, U-boat commander
- 11 December – Alexander zu Dohna-Schlobitten (1899–1997), businessman (died 1997)
- 13 December – Wilhelm Decker, Nazi Germany official (died 1945)
- 22 December:
  - Princess Helena of Waldeck and Pyrmont, noblewoman (died 1948)
  - Gustaf Gründgens, actor (died 1963)
- 24 December – Carl Troll, geographer (died 1975)
- Date unknown – Kurt Roth, painter (died 1975)

== Deaths ==
- 9 January – Ernst Julius Gurlt, surgeon (born 1825)
- 18 January:
  - Carl Friedrich Wilhelm Claus, zoologist (born 1835)
  - Heinrich Kirchweger, railway engineer (born 1809)
- 1 February – Ernst Melzer, philosopher (born 1835)
- 6 February:
  - Alfred, Hereditary Prince of Saxe-Coburg and Gotha, nobleman (born 1874)
  - Leo von Caprivi, Chancellor of Germany (born 1831)
- 8 February – Ferdinand Wüstenfeld, orientalist (born 1808)
- 9 February – Karl Müller, bryologist (born 1818)
- 11 February – Johann August Kaupert, topographer (born 1822)
- 20 February – Ernst Philipp Karl Lange, novelist (born 1813)
- 8 March – Johann Baptist Weiss, historian (born 1820)
- 14 March:
  - Ludwig Bamberger, economist and politician (born 1823)
  - Heymann Steinthal, philologist (born 1823)
- 24 March – Gustav Heinrich Wiedemann, physicist (born 1826)
- 15 April:
  - Lambert Heinrich von Babo, chemist (born 1818)
  - Karl Ludwig Kahlbaum, psychiatrist (born 1828)
- 25 April – Hermann Wislicenus, painter (born 1825)
- 1 May – Ludwig Büchner, philosopher (born 1824)
- 2 May – Eduard von Simson, jurist and politician (born 1810)
- 6 May – Philipp Krementz, Archbishop of Cologne (born 1819)
- 15 May – Elise Polko, novelist (born 1822)
- 1 June – Klaus Groth, poet (born 1819)
- 19 June – Eugen von Lommel, physicist (born 1837)
- 12 July – Azriel Hildesheimer, founder of Modern Orthodox Judaism (born 1820)
- 27 July – Tassilo von Heydebrand und der Lasa, chess player (born 1818)
- 29 July – Adolf Schreyer, painter (born 1828)
- 30 July – Princess Adelheid of Schaumburg-Lippe, noblewoman (born 1821)
- 4 August – Karl, Freiherr von Prel, philosopher (born 1839)
- 7 August – Carl Friedrich Wilhelm Alfred Fleckeisen, philologist (born 1820)
- 13 August:
  - Karl Heinrich Weizsäcker, theologian (born 1822)
  - Gustav von Mevissen, politician (born 1815)
- 16 August – Robert Bunsen, chemist and inventor (born 1811)
- 28 October – Ottmar Mergenthaler, inventor of linotype (born 1854)
- 30 October – Hermann Blumenau, German pharmacist (born 1819)
- 13 November – Ulrike von Levetzow, 'muse' to Goethe (born 1804)
- 14 November – Ferdinand Tiemann, chemist (born 1848)
- 16 November – Julius Hermann Moritz Busch, publicist (born 1821)
- 3 December – Georg Ratzinger, priest and politician (born 1844)
- 4 December – Leopold Ullstein, company founder and publisher (born 1826)
- 8 December – Max Lange, chess player (born 1832)
- 28 December – Karl Friedrich August Rammelsberg, mineralogist (born 1813)
