= 1900 in Germany =

- Decades: 1880s; 1890s; 1900s; 1910s; 1920s
- See also: Other events of 1900; History of Germany • Timeline • Years

Events in the year 1900 in Germany.

== Incumbents ==
=== National level ===
- Emperor – Wilhelm II
- Chancellor – Chlodwig, Prince of Hohenlohe-Schillingsfürst to 17 October, then Bernhard von Bülow

=== State level ===
==== Kingdoms ====
- King of Bavaria – Otto
- King of Prussia – Wilhelm II
- King of Saxony – Albert
- King of Württemberg – William II

==== Grand Duchies ====
- Grand Duke of Baden – Frederick I
- Grand Duke of Hesse – Ernest Louis
- Grand Duke of Mecklenburg-Schwerin – Frederick Francis IV
- Grand Duke of Mecklenburg-Strelitz – Frederick William
- Grand Duke of Oldenburg – Peter II to 13 June, then Frederick Augustus II
- Grand Duke of Saxe-Weimar-Eisenach – Charles Alexander

==== Principalities ====
- Schaumburg-Lippe – George, Prince of Schaumburg-Lippe
- Schwarzburg-Rudolstadt – Günther Victor, Prince of Schwarzburg-Rudolstadt
- Schwarzburg-Sondershausen – Karl Günther, Prince of Schwarzburg-Sondershausen
- Principality of Lippe – Alexander, Prince of Lippe (with Ernest II, Count of Lippe-Biesterfeld as regent)
- Reuss Elder Line – Heinrich XXII, Prince Reuss of Greiz
- Reuss Younger Line – Heinrich XIV, Prince Reuss Younger Line
- Waldeck and Pyrmont – Friedrich, Prince of Waldeck and Pyrmont

==== Duchies ====
- Duke of Anhalt – Frederick I, Duke of Anhalt
- Duke of Brunswick – Prince Albert of Prussia (regent)
- Duke of Saxe-Altenburg – Ernst I, Duke of Saxe-Altenburg
- Duke of Saxe-Coburg and Gotha – Alfred, Duke of Saxe-Coburg and Gotha to 30 July, then Charles Edward, Duke of Saxe-Coburg and Gotha
- Duke of Saxe-Meiningen – Georg II, Duke of Saxe-Meiningen

==== Colonial Governors ====
- Cameroon (Kamerun) – Jesko von Puttkamer (6th term) to 17 January, then August Köhler to 31 July, then ...Dehl, (acting governor) to 6 September, then ...von Kamptz (acting governor) to 15 November, then again Jesko von Puttkamer (7th term)
- Kiaochow (Kiautschou) – Otto Jäschke
- German East Africa (Deutsch-Ostafrika) – Eduard von Liebert
- German New Guinea (Deutsch-Neuguinea) – Rudolf von Bennigsen
- German Samoa (Deutsch-Samoa) (from 1 March) – Wilhelm Solf
- German South-West Africa – Theodor Leutwein
- Togoland – August Köhler

== Events ==
- 4 January – Riots break out as miners go on strike.
- 6 January – The German steamer Herzog is seized by the British warship HMS Thetis outside Delagoa Bay in East Africa, on suspicions that it was carrying supplies to Boer troops. The Portuguese colonial Governor of Zambesia is among the passengers. After no supplies are found, the ship and its crew are released on 22 January.
- 1 March – The German flag is formally hoisted at Apia, the capital of Samoa, and Wilhelm Solf becomes the colony's first governor. Chief Mata'afa, who had fought against the Germans, and Chief Tamasese, who had been the puppet ruler during German occupation, are reconciled. Mata'afa is named as the Paramount Chief of the Western Samoa colony, although Germany's Kaiser Wilhelm II is designated as the Paramount King.
- 1 April – The 6th Royal Bavarian Division is raised as a new addition to the German Imperial Army.
- 13 June – When three Chinese Boxers come too close to the German legation, one of them, a young man, is captured by the German guards. Baron von Ketteler, the German minister, thrashes the Boxer with his cane, orders his guards to extend the beating, and warns the Chinese Foreign Ministry (the Zongli Yamen) that the boy will die. Over the next few days, the foreign diplomats begin shooting at Chinese nationals near the legation quarter. Von Ketteler himself would be killed on 20 June. The same day, communication between the foreign embassies and the rest of the world is broken off as telegraph lines are severed.
- 14 June
  - At 7:00 pm, German embassy guards, under the direction of Ambassador Ketteler, fire on Boxer rebels outside the legation quarter, killing 20. Lancelot Giles, of the British embassy, records the incident in his diary that night, noting the furious shouts from a crowd trying to get into the city. G.E. Morrison, correspondent for the London Times, noted another incident where 45 Chinese were killed in a raid by the Europeans on a temple.
  - The Reichstag approves a second law that allows the expansion of the Imperial German Navy.
- 20 June – Clemens von Ketteler, the German ambassador to China, was murdered as he and an aide went to the Chinese Foreign Ministry (Zongli Yamen) without their guards. With seven hours left until a 4 p.m. deadline for all foreigners to leave Beijing, Baron von Ketteler defied his fellow ambassadors and left the safety of the diplomatic quarter. Von Ketteler was shot and killed (by a Boxer later identified as En Hai) as he approached the Zongli Yamen. His interpreter, Heinrich Cordes, survived to return to the embassy, at which point evacuation was no longer an option. American ambassador Conger would later report that he had learned "that Prince Tuan had planned to have his soldiers massacre all the foreign ministers at the Tsungli Yamen on June 20. But...the impatient soldiers prematurely attacked and killed Baron von Kettler... we were not invited to the Tsungli Yamen, and so were saved. The directive to Mr. Conger stated, 'The princes and ministers...beg that within twenty-four hours the minister of the United States, with his family... and taking his guards, keeping them under control, will leave for Tientsin, in order to avoid danger. An escort of troops has been dispatched to give protection en route, and the local officials have been also notified to allow the minister's party to pass.'" At 4:00 p.m., Chinese troops began their siege of the foreign legations quarter, where 900 foreigners, 523 defenders, and 3,000 Chinese Christians held out behind the walls. The siege would last 55 days.
- 21 June – China formally declares war on Germany.
- 14 July – In China, Tientsin (Tianjin) is captured by the Allied forces after a three-day battle. The Allies had 775 killed or wounded, mostly from Russian troops and Japanese troops under the command of the Japanese Colonel Kuriya. Parties of German and French soldiers destroyed the enemy's guns, while American, British, Japanese and Austrian troops, and the Welsh Fussillers captured the arsenal.
- 27 July – Kaiser Wilhelm II gives the infamous "Hun speech" at Bremerhaven as he dispatched troops to fight in China. The most inflammatory line was, "Wie vor tausend Jahren die Hunnen unter ihrem König Etzel sich einen Namen gemacht, der sie noch jetzt in Überlieferung und Märchen gewaltig erscheinen läßt, so möge der Name Deutscher in China auf 1000 Jahre durch euch in einer Weise bestätigt werden, daß es niemals wieder ein Chinese wagt, einen Deutschen scheel anzusehen!". "Just as the Huns under their King Atilla made a name for themselves a thousand years ago which still, in saga and tradition, makes them appear powerful, so may the name "German" be impressed by you for a thousand years, that no Chinese will ever dare again look askance at a German!" The Germans were, for a century thereafter, referred to as "Huns".
- 17 October – Bernhard von Bülow becomes the fourth Chancellor of the German Empire, appointed by Kaiser Wilhelm I. The former Foreign Secretary succeeded Prince Chlodwig Hohenlohe, who resigned because of his age (81) and health.
- 16 November – During a parade in Breslau (now Wrocław, Poland), a woman throws a hatchet at the open carriage of Kaiser Wilhelm II. The "hand chopper" strikes the imperial carriage, and Selma Schnapke, later ruled to be insane, is arrested.
- 1 December – A census of the German Empire was taken. Provisional figures showed a population of 56,345,014.
- 31 December – At 3:00 in the afternoon in Beijing, Su-Hai, identified as the man who had killed Baron von Ketteler, Germany's minister to China, on 20 June, became the last prominent person to die in the 19th century. Su-Hai was beheaded at the scene of the crime.

== Architecture ==
- The Salzgitter Bismarck Tower is completed.

== Commerce ==
- 3 June – A series of meat inspection laws, at the time the most comprehensive in the world, are introduced.
- 1 September – The German-American Telegraph Company opens the first direct line between Germany and the United States. At 7,917 kilometres or 4,919 miles, the line was the longest transatlantic cable to that time, running from Emden to New York City, via the Azores Islands.

=== Undated ===
- The Adler automobile company is established.

== Diplomacy ==
- 14 January – The United States Senate accepts the Anglo-German treaty of 1899, in which the United Kingdom renounces its claims to the Samoan islands.
- 16 February – In Washington, British Ambassador Lord Pauncefote, and German Ambassador Baron Theodor von Holleben meet Secretary of State Hay at the State Department, and exchange ratifications of the Samoan Treaty signed by all three nations. "Secretary Hay retained for the United States the copy of the treaty which was ratified by the United States Senate. He handed to Lord Pauncefote and to Herr von Holleben copies of the treaty bearing the signatures of the President and himself", reported the New York Times. Similar proceedings take place in London and Berlin with the foreign ministers and ambassadors, completing the Tripartite Convention of 1899. Under the treaty, the Pacific islands of Samoa are divided between the U.S. (as American Samoa) and Germany (later the Independent State of Samoa).
- 16 October – Germany and the UK sign an agreement in London to they oppose the partition of China into spheres of influence. The "Yangtze Agreement", signed by Lord Salisbury and Ambassador Hatzfeldt, was an endorsement of the Open Door Policy proposed by the United States for free trade in China.
- 5 December – Germany, Austria-Hungary and Italy sign a treaty providing that their navies will work together in the event of an attack on either nation by France or Russia.

== Education ==
- Women in Germany demand the right to participate in university entrance exams.

== Science ==
- 7 March – A new era in transportation safety began on reports of the first successful transmission of Wireless signals from a passenger ship to a distant receiver. The German steamer SS Kaiser Wilhelm der Grosse, carrying 1,500 passengers, transmitted from on ship to Borkum, fifty miles away.
- 7 April – At Thomas Edison's laboratory, an agent of the Goldschmidt Chemische-Thermo Industrie of Essen, Germany, demonstrate a process to melt iron in five seconds. "Louis Dreyfus of Frankfort-on-Main...showed Mr. Edison his new process for attaining an enormous degree of heat in an incredibly short space of time by the combustion of a certain chemical compound which the inventor keeps a secret," the New York Times reported, "then placed a six-inch long iron wrench in a crucible and created a fire that reached 3,000 degrees centigrade."
- 16 August – A German excavation at the Tel Amran ibn Ali, near the Babylonian temple at Etemenanki (near modern Al Hillah, Iraq), German excavators unearth a glazed amphora with 10,000 coins dating from the 7th century BC.
- 15 October – Questionnaires are sent to every physician in Germany in the first attempt to make a study on the prevalence of cancer.
- 14 December – On a date now considered to be the birthday of quantum mechanics, Max Planck presents his paper Zur Theorie des Gesetzes der Energieverteilung in Normalspektrum (On the Theory of the Law of Energy Distribution in Normal Spectrum) at a meeting of the German Physical Society in Berlin.

== Sport ==
- 27 February – Foundation of Bayern Munich.
- 14 May – 28 October – The 1900 Summer Olympics takes place in Paris, France. Germany finishes seventh in the overall medal table with four gold medals, two silver and two bronze.
- 9 June – Olymp Berlin, German association football club is established.
- 1 August – Foundation of Borussia Mönchengladbach
- 4 November – The German Rugby Federation (Deutscher Rugby-Verband) is founded at Kassel.
- The inaugural BMW Open tennis event is held by the Münchner Tennis- und Turnierclub (MTTC) Iphitos club.

== Transport ==
- 10 January – The Deutschland, operated by the Hamburg-American Line and promising to be the fastest passenger ship to that time, is launched from the shipyards at Stettin, Germany (now Szczecin, Poland).
- 16 June – In Lübeck, Germany, the Elbe-Lübeck Canal, 41 miles (66 km) in length, is formally opened by Kaiser Wilhelm II of Germany. The canal took five years to build at a cost of nearly six million dollars at the time, and joined the Elbe River to the Trave, which in turn provided ocean access at the Baltic Sea.
- 30 June – At Pier 8 in Hoboken, New Jersey, cotton bales and barrels of turpentine and oil catch fire around 4 o'clock in the afternoon. In less than 15 minutes, high winds spread the blaze a quarter of a mile along the port and on to the four German steamships moored there. The Saale and the Main, each with 150 crew on board, are destroyed, and the Bremen is heavily damaged. On the Saale, the portholes are too narrow for the men inside to escape, and most on board burned to death. The huge liner SS Kaiser Wilhelm der Grosse is saved by being towed into the Hudson River. Despite the best efforts of the Hoboken and New York fire departments to save the piers and the ships, respectively, 326 people are killed.
- 2 July – Starting at 8:03 pm, the first rigid airship flies from a floating hangar on Lake Constance near Friedrichshafen. Luftschiff Zeppelin 1 (or LZ1), with Count Ferdinand von Zeppelin and four others aboard, flew at an altitude of 1,300 feet (400 m), going 3.75 miles (6.04 km) in 18 minutes before being forced to land due to a broken part.
- 12 July – A German cruise liner, the SS Deutschland, wins the Blue Riband for the first time with an average speed of 22.42 knots (41.52 km/h).
- 16 December – The German training frigate Gneisenau, with 450 naval cadets on board, sinks in a storm during exercises off of the Spanish coast at Malaga, drowning 136.

== Publications ==
- 24 December – Iskra, a newspaper published by Vladimir Lenin in support of Bolshevik rebellion in Russia, is published for the first time, printed in Leipzig.

== Births ==
- 22 January – Ernst Busch, singer and actor (died 1980)
- 25 February – Illa Martin, dendrologist, botanist, conservationist and dentist (died 1988)
- 28 February – Wolfram Hirth, pilot and aircraft designer (died 1959)
- 2 March – Kurt Weill, composer (died 1950)
- 5 March
  - Lilli Jahn, doctor (died 1944 in Poland)
  - Johanna Langefeld, guard, supervisor of three Nazi concentration camps (died 1974)
- 10 March – Erich Kästner, last surviving German veteran of World War I (died 2008)
- 11 March – Hanna Bergas, teacher who helped rescue Jewish children during WWII (died 1987)
- 23 March – Erich Fromm, psychologist and philosopher (died 1980)
- 26 March – Angela Maria Autsch, nun who died in Auschwitz helping Jewish prisoners (died 1944 in Poland)
- 14 April – Hermann Bartels, architect (died 1989)
- 21 April – Hans Fritzsche, Nazi official (died 1953)
- 26 April – Eva Aschoff, bookbinder and calligrapher (died 1969)
- 12 May – Helene Weigel, actress (died 1971)
- 15 May – Franz Ollendorff, German-born Israeli physicist (died 1981)
- 23 May
  - Hans Frank, Nazi military governor of Poland 1939–1945 (died 1946)
  - Gustav Riek, archaeologist (died 1976)
- 27 May – Lotte Toberentz, overseer of the Nazi Uckermark concentration camp (died unknown)
- 3 June – Leo Picard, German-born Israeli geologist and an expert in the field of hydrology (died 1997)
- 17 June – Martin Bormann, Deputy Führer of Germany, 1941–1945 (died 1945)
- 6 July – Elfriede Wever, Olympic runner (died 1941)
- 7 July – Maria Bard, actress (died 1944)
- 14 August
  - Margret Boveri, journalist, recipient of the Order of Merit of the Federal Republic of Germany (died 1975)
  - Benita von Falkenhayn, baroness, spy for the Second Polish Republic (died 1935)
- 25 August – Sir Hans Adolf Krebs, German Jewish (later British) physician and biochemist and Nobel laureate (died 1981)
- 26 August – Hellmuth Walter, rocket engineer (died 1980)
- 25 September – Fritz Kolbe, diplomat and spy (died 1971)
- 1 October – Bruno Klopfer, psychologist (died 1971)
- 7 October – Heinrich Himmler, Reichsführer-SS (died 1945)
- 19 October
  - Erna Berger, coloratura lyric soprano (died 1990)
  - Fritz Kranefuss, industrialist (died 1945)
- 3 November – Adolf "Adi" Dassler, founder of the Adidas shoe company (died 1978)
- 2 December – Herta Hammerbacher, landscape architect (died 1985)
- 16 December – Rudolf Diels, founder of the Gestapo (died 1957)
- 20 December – Lissy Arna, film actress (died 1964)

== Deaths ==
- 15 January – Hermann Eschke, marine painter (born 1823)
- 6 March
  - Carl Bechstein, piano maker (born 1826)
  - Gottlieb Daimler, inventor and automotive pioneer (born 1834)
- 13 June – Peter II, Grand Duke of Oldenburg (born 1827)
- 25 June – Louis Christian Klein, German-born businessman (born 1832)
- 27 June – Mary Krebs-Brenning, pianist (born 1851)
- 18 July – Karl Eggers, lyric poet (born 1826)
- 30 July – Alfred, Duke of Saxe-Coburg and Gotha (born 1844)
- 7 August – Wilhelm Liebknecht, Social Democrat politician (born 1826)
- 25 August – Friedrich Nietzsche, philosopher (born 1844)
- 27 September – Albert Bernhard Frank, botanist (born 1839)
- 28 October – Max Müller, philologist and Orientalist (born 1823)
- 12 December – Roderich von Erckert, ethnographer (born 1821)
- 20 December – Karl Becker, history painter (born 1820)
