= Gurlt =

Gurlt is a surname. Notable people with the surname include:

- Adolf Gurlt (1829–1902), German geologist and mining engineer
- Ernst Friedrich Gurlt (1794–1882), German veterinarian and anatomist
- Ernst Julius Gurlt (1825–1899), German surgeon
- Johann Gurlt (died 1839), German murderer
