= 1957 in Germany =

- Decades: 1930s; 1940s; 1950s; 1960s; 1970s
- See also: Other events of 1957; History of Germany • Timeline • Years

Events in the year 1957 in Germany.

== Incumbents ==
- President – Theodor Heuss
- Chancellor – Konrad Adenauer
- Second Adenauer cabinet (until October)
- Third Adenauer cabinet (sworn in on 29 October, after the federal election on 15 September)

== Events ==
- 27 February - Germany in the Eurovision Song Contest 1957
- 12 April - Göttingen Manifesto
- 21 June - 2 July - 7th Berlin International Film Festival
- 1 August - The Deutsche Bundesbank was established.
- 15 September - West German federal election, 1957
- 29 October The Third Adenauer cabinet led by Konrad Adenauer was sworn in.

=== Full date unknown ===
- The Balda Baldessa 35 mm film camera debuts.

== Births ==
- 8 February - Imogen Kogge, German actor
- 18 February - Marita Koch, German athlete
- 8 March - Axel A. Weber, German economist, professor and banker
- 10 March - Hans-Peter Friedrich, German politician
- 14 March - Kai Krause, German computer scientist
- 18 May - Frank Plasberg, German journalist
- 24 May - Walter Moers, German comic creator and author
- 31 May - Ilse Junkermann, German bishop of the Evangelical Church in Central Germany
- 17 June - Joachim Król, German actor
- 5 July - Carlo Thränhardt, German high jumper
- 12 July - Götz Alsmann, German television presenter and musician
- 29 July - Ulrich Tukur, German actor
- 4 August Olaf Beyer, German athlete
- 18 August - Harald Schmidt, German actor, writer, columnist, comedian and television entertainer
- 26 August - Christian Schmidt, German politician
- 27 August - Bernhard Langer, German golfer
- 8 September - Christoph Eichhorn, German actor
- 10 September - Matthias Brenner, German actor
- 26 November - Matthias Reim, German singer
- 12 September - Hans Zimmer, German composer
- 20 September - Sabine Christiansen, German journalist
- 23 September - Suzanne von Borsody, German actress
- 29 September
  - Uwe Foullong, politician
  - Harald Schmid, German track and field athlete
- 21 October - Wolfgang Ketterle, German physicist
- 10 November - Ingo Metzmacher, German conductor
- 8 December - Hannelore Anke, German swimmer
- 12 December - Tom Gerhardt, German actor and comedian
- 29 December - Oliver Hirschbiegel, German film director
- 30 December - Johann Riederer, German sport shooter

== Deaths ==
- January 1 - Hans Wölpert, German weightlifter (born 1898)
- January 22 - Claire Waldoff, German singer (born 1884)
- January 31 - Christian Hülsmeyer, German inventor, physicist and entrepreneur (born 1881)
- February 1 - Friedrich Paulus, German field marshal (born 1890)
- February 8 - Walther Bothe, German physicist (born 1891)
- February 13 - Gustav Mie, German physicist (born 1868)
- February 14 - Erich Ponto, German actor (born 1884)
- March 26 - Max Ophüls, German film director (born 1902)
- May 7 - Wilhelm Filchner, German explorer (born 1877)
- May 10 - Kurt von Tippelskirch, German general (born 1891)
- May 15 - Karl Friedrich Bonhoeffer, chemist (born 1899)
- June 4 – Louise Schroeder, German politician (born 1887)
- June 21 - Johannes Stark, German chemist Nobel Prize laureate (born 1874)
- June 26 - Alfred Döblin, German novelist, essayist and writer (born 1878)
- July 1 - August Euler, German aviator and aeronautical engineer (born 1868)
- July 3 - Richard Mohaupt, German composer and kapellmeister (born 1904)
- August 5 - Heinrich Otto Wieland, German chemist, Nobel Prize in Chemistry (born 1877)
- August 30 - Otto Suhr, German politician (born 1894)
- October 28 - Ernst Gräfenberg, physician (medical doctor) and scientist (born 1881)
- October 29 - Rosemarie Nitribitt. German luxury call girl (born 1933)
- December 9 - Otto Landsberg, German politician (born 1869)
- December 27 - Otto Nuschke, German politician (born 1883)

== See also ==
- 1957 in German television
