= Balda (disambiguation) =

Balda may refer to:

- Balda, a character from the fairy tale by Alexander Pushkin The Tale of the Priest and of His Workman Balda
- Balda, Mureș, constituent locality of Sărmașu, Romania
- Balda, German company which produced Balda Baldessa cameras
- Balda Canyon Natural Monument, Georgia
- three villages: First Balda, Second Balda, Third Balda in Martvili Municipality, Georgia
- Balda Group, a division of Stevanato Group
- Baldemu language
- Balda (name)
