= 1898 in Germany =

- Decades: 1870s; 1880s; 1890s; 1900s; 1910s
- See also: Other events of 1898; History of Germany • Timeline • Years

Events in the year 1898 in Germany.

== Incumbents ==
=== National level ===
- Emperor – Wilhelm II
- Chancellor – Chlodwig, Prince of Hohenlohe-Schillingsfürst

=== State level ===
==== Kingdoms ====
- King of Bavaria – Otto
- King of Prussia – Wilhelm II
- King of Saxony – Albert
- King of Württemberg – William II

==== Grand Duchies ====
- Grand Duke of Baden – Frederick I
- Grand Duke of Hesse – Ernest Louis
- Grand Duke of Mecklenburg-Schwerin – Frederick Francis IV
- Grand Duke of Mecklenburg-Strelitz – Frederick William
- Grand Duke of Oldenburg – Peter II
- Grand Duke of Saxe-Weimar-Eisenach – Charles Alexander

==== Principalities ====
- Schaumburg-Lippe – George, Prince of Schaumburg-Lippe
- Schwarzburg-Rudolstadt – Günther Victor, Prince of Schwarzburg-Rudolstadt
- Schwarzburg-Sondershausen – Karl Günther, Prince of Schwarzburg-Sondershausen
- Principality of Lippe – Alexander, Prince of Lippe (with Ernest II, Count of Lippe-Biesterfeld, as regent)
- Reuss Elder Line – Heinrich XXII, Prince Reuss of Greiz
- Reuss Younger Line – Heinrich XIV, Prince Reuss Younger Line
- Waldeck and Pyrmont – Friedrich, Prince of Waldeck and Pyrmont

==== Duchies ====
- Duke of Anhalt – Frederick I, Duke of Anhalt
- Duke of Brunswick – Prince Albert of Prussia (regent)
- Duke of Saxe-Altenburg – Ernst I, Duke of Saxe-Altenburg
- Duke of Saxe-Coburg and Gotha – Alfred, Duke of Saxe-Coburg and Gotha
- Duke of Saxe-Meiningen – Georg II, Duke of Saxe-Meiningen

==== Colonial governors ====
- Cameroon (Kamerun) – Jesko von Puttkamer (5th term) to 12 January, then Theodor Seitz (2nd term) to 13 October, then again Jesko von Puttkamer (6th term) from 14 October
- Kiautschou – Carl Rosendahl from 7 March
- German East Africa (Deutsch-Ostafrika) – Eduard von Liebert
- German New Guinea (Deutsch-Neuguinea) – Hugo Skopnik (Landeshauptleute of the German New Guinea Company)
- German South-West Africa (Deutsch-Südwestafrika) – Theodor Leutwein (Landeshauptleute to 18 April, then governor)
- Togoland – August Köhler (Landeshauptleute to 18 April, then governor)

== Events ==
- 28 March – The German Reichstag builds a battleship fleet from the Fleet Act, triggering an arms race at sea with the United Kingdom.
- 10 April _ 1898 Naval Law signed into German law.
- 30 April – The German Fleet Association is founded in Berlin to arouse popular understanding and interest in the Imperial Navy. The government favors the construction of battleships in the Reichsmarineamt under Alfred von Tirpitz.
- 5 June – Helvetia Berlin, association football club established.
- 16 June – German federal election, 1898
- October 3–8 – The Stuttgart Congress of the Social Democratic Party of Germany is held in Stuttgart.
- 25 October _ WilheIm II voyages to the Levant.
- Unknown date – An industrial robot and factory automation manufacturing brand KUKA was founded in Bavaria.

== Births ==
- 4 June – Aryeh Leo Olitzki, German-born Israeli bacteriologist (died 1983)
- 23 June – Karl Weinbacher, German manager and war criminal (died 1946)
- 6 July – Hanns Eislers, composer (died 1962)
- 25 August – Helmut Hasse, mathematician (died 1979)
- 26 November – Karl Ziegler, chemist and Nobel Prize in Chemistry laureate (died 1973)

== Deaths ==
- 10 March – George Müller, Prussian evangelist, founder of the Ashley Down orphanage (born 1805)
- 29 May – Theodor Eimer, German zoologist (born 1843)
- 30 July – Otto von Bismarck, German politician, Chancellor of Germany (born 1815)
- 20 September – Theodor Fontane, German writer (born 1819)
- 25 September – Hieronymous Theodor Richter, German chemist (born 1824)
- 29 December – Georg Goltermann, German cellist, conductor and composer (born 1824)
