= Internationalism (politics) =

Movement that advocates greater economic and political cooperation among nations

Internationalism is a political principle that advocates greater political or economic cooperation among states and nations. It is associated with other political movements and ideologies, but can also reflect a doctrine, belief system, or movement in itself.

Supporters of internationalism are known as internationalists and generally believe that humans should unite across national, political, cultural, racial, or class boundaries to advance their common interests, or that governments should cooperate because their mutual long-term interests are of greater importance than their short-term disputes.

Internationalism has several interpretations and meanings, but is usually characterized by opposition to ultranationalism and isolationism; support for international institutions such as the United Nations; and a cosmopolitan outlook that promotes and respects other cultures and customs. Internationalism, specifically liberal internationalism and multilateralism, has been a central and popular feature of the foreign policy of middle powers like Canada. This approach is often referred to as "middle power diplomacy".

The term is similar to, but distinct from, globalism and cosmopolitanism.

== Origins ==
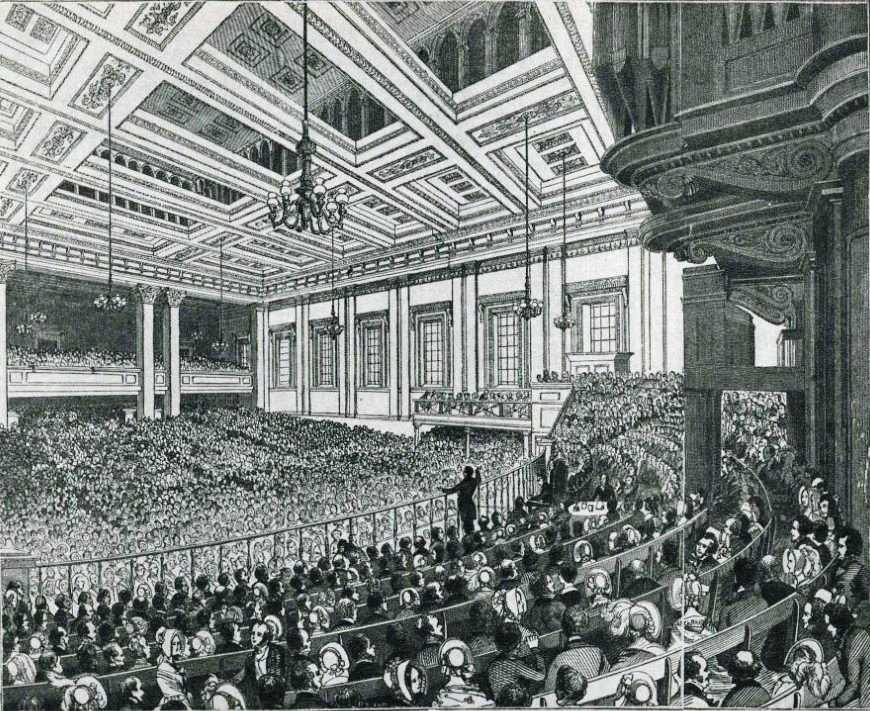
Meeting of the Anti-Corn Law League, 1846

In 19th-century Great Britain, there was a liberal internationalist strand of political thought epitomized by Richard Cobden and John Bright. Cobden and Bright were against the protectionist Corn Laws and in a speech at Covent Garden on September 28, 1843, Cobden outlined his utopian brand of internationalism:

Free Trade! What is it? Why, breaking down the barriers that separate nations; those barriers behind which nestle the feelings of pride, revenge, hatred and jealously, which every now and then burst their bounds and deluge whole countries with blood.

Cobden believed that Free Trade would pacify the world by interdependence, an idea also expressed by Adam Smith in his The Wealth of Nations and common to many liberals of the time. A belief in the idea of the moral law and an inherent goodness in human nature also inspired their faith in internationalism.

Those liberal conceptions of internationalism were harshly criticized by socialists and radicals at the time, who pointed out the links between global economic competition and imperialism, and would identify this competition as being a root cause of world conflict. One of the first international organisations in the world was the International Workingmen's Association, formed in London in 1864 by working class socialist and communist political activists (including Karl Marx). Referred to as the First International, the organization was dedicated to the advancement of working class political interests across national boundaries, and was in direct ideological opposition to strains of liberal internationalism which advocated free trade and capitalism as means of achieving world peace and interdependence.

The flag of the United Nations, the world's premier international organization and proponent of internationalism

Other international organizations included the Inter-Parliamentary Union, established in 1889 by Frédéric Passy from France and William Randal Cremer from the United Kingdom, and the League of Nations, which was formed after World War I. The former was envisioned as a permanent forum for political multilateral negotiations, while the latter was an attempt to solve the world's security problems through international arbitration and dialogue.

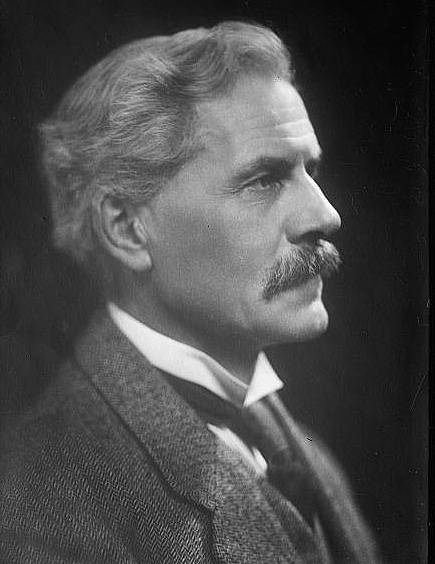
Ramsay MacDonald, a political spokesman for internationalism

J. A. Hobson, a Gladstonian liberal who became a socialist after the Great War, anticipated in his book Imperialism (1902) the growth of international courts and congresses which would hopefully settle international disputes between nations in a peaceful way. Sir Norman Angell in his work The Great Illusion (1910) claimed that the world was united by trade, finance, industry and communications and that therefore nationalism was an anachronism and that war would not profit anyone involved but would only result in destruction.

Lord Lothian was an internationalist and an imperialist who in December 1914 looked forward to "the voluntary federation of the free civilised nations which will eventually exorcise the spectre of competitive armaments and give lasting peace to mankind."

In September 1915, he thought the British Empire was "the perfect example of the eventual world Commonwealth."

Internationalism expressed itself in Britain through the endorsement of the League of Nations by such people as Gilbert Murray. The Liberal Party and the Labour Party had prominent internationalist members, like the Labour Prime Minister Ramsay MacDonald who believed that 'our true nationality is mankind'

== Modern expression ==
Internationalism is most commonly expressed as an appreciation for the diverse cultures in the world, and a desire for world peace. People who express this view believe in not only being a citizen of their respective countries, but of being a citizen of the world. Internationalists feel obliged to assist the world through leadership and charity.

Internationalists also advocate the presence of international organizations, such as the United Nations, and often support a stronger form of a world government.

Contributors to the current version of internationalism include Albert Einstein, who was a socialist and believed in a world government, and classified the follies of nationalism as "an infantile sickness". Conversely, other internationalists such as Christian Lange and Rebecca West saw little conflict between holding nationalist and internationalist positions.

=== International organizations and internationalism ===
For both intergovernmental organizations and international non-governmental organizations to emerge, nations and peoples had to be strongly aware that they shared certain interests and objectives across national boundaries and they could best solve their many problems by pooling their resources and effecting transnational cooperation, rather than through individual countries' unilateral efforts. Such a view, such global consciousness, may be termed internationalism, the idea that nations and peoples should cooperate instead of preoccupying themselves with their respective national interests or pursuing uncoordinated approaches to promote them.

=== Sovereign states vs. supranational powers balance ===
In the strict meaning of the word, internationalism is still based on the existence of sovereign state. Its aims are to encourage multilateralism (world leadership not held by any single country) and create some formal and informal interdependence between countries, with some limited supranational powers given to international organisations controlled by those nations via intergovernmental treaties and institutions.

The ideal of many internationalists, among them world citizens, is to go a step further towards democratic globalization by creating a world government. However, this idea is opposed and/or thwarted by other internationalists, who believe any world government body would be inherently too powerful to be trusted, or because they dislike the path taken by supranational entities such as the United Nations or a union of states such as the European Union and fear that a world government inclined towards fascism would emerge from the former. These internationalists are more likely to support a loose world federation in which most power resides with national governments or sub-national governments.

== Socialist political theory ==
Internationalism is an important component of socialist political theory, based on the principle that working-class people of all countries must unite across national boundaries and actively oppose nationalism and war in order to overthrow capitalism. In this sense, the socialist understanding of internationalism is closely related to the concept of international solidarity.

Socialist thinkers such as Karl Marx, Friedrich Engels, and Vladimir Lenin argue that economic class, rather than (or interrelated with) nationality, race, or culture, is the main force which divides people in society, and that nationalist ideology is a propaganda tool of a society's dominant economic class. From this perspective, it is in the ruling class' interest to promote nationalism in order to hide the inherent class conflicts at play within a given society (such as the exploitation of workers by capitalists for profit). Therefore, socialists see nationalism as a form of ideological control arising from a society's given mode of economic production (see dominant ideology).

Since the 19th century, socialist political organizations and radical trade unions such as the Industrial Workers of the World have promoted internationalist ideologies and sought to organize workers across national boundaries to achieve improvements in the conditions of labor and advance various forms of industrial democracy. The First, Second, Third, and Fourth Internationals were socialist political groupings which sought to advance worker's revolution across the globe and achieve international socialism (see world revolution).

Socialist internationalism is anti-imperialist, and therefore supports the liberation of peoples from all forms of colonialism and foreign domination, and the right of nations to self-determination. Therefore, socialists have often aligned themselves politically with anti-colonial independence movements, and actively opposed the exploitation of one country by another.

Since war is understood in socialist theory to be a general product of the laws of economic competition inherent to capitalism (i.e., competition between capitalists and their respective national governments for natural resources and economic dominance), liberal ideologies which promote international capitalism and "free trade", even if they sometimes speak in positive terms of international cooperation, are, from the socialist standpoint, rooted in the very economic forces which drive world conflict. In socialist theory, world peace can only come once economic competition has been ended and class divisions within society have ceased to exist. This idea was expressed in 1848 by Karl Marx and Friedrich Engels in The Communist Manifesto:

In proportion as the exploitation of one individual by another will also be put an end to, the exploitation of one nation by another will also be put an end to. In proportion as the antagonism between classes within the nation vanishes, the hostility of one nation to another will come to an end.

The idea was reiterated later by Lenin and advanced as the official policy of the Bolshevik party during World War I:

Socialists have always condemned war between nations as barbarous and brutal. But our attitude towards war is fundamentally different from that of the bourgeois pacifists (supporters and advocates of peace) and of the Anarchists. We differ from the former in that we understand the inevitable connection between wars and the class struggle within the country; we understand that war cannot be abolished unless classes are abolished and Socialism is created.

=== Anarchist internationalism ===
From its very inception, anarchism was regarded as essentially internationalist and internationalism considered one of its most clear and stable principles, and similarly to other radical socialists anarchists feared that without international solidarity and cooperation between workers of different countries, the revolution against state and capitalism would inevitably fail. Many anarchists empathized international solidarity over workers attempting to reform their nation-states, which can be seen in Bakunin's critique of German social democratic program:

In case of conflict between two states, the workers would act in accordance with Article 1of the social-democratic program, they would, against their better inclinations, be joining their own bourgeoisie against their fellow workers in a foreign country. They would thereby sacrifice the international solidarity of the workers to the national patriotism of the State... As long as the German workers seek to set up a national state – even the freest People’s State – they will inevitably and utterly sacrifice the freedom of the people to the glory of the State, socialism to politics, justice and international brotherhood to patriotism. It is impossible to go in two different directions at the same time. Socialism and social revolution involve the destruction of the State: – consequently, those who want a state must sacrifice the economic emancipation of the masses to the political monopoly of a privileged party

Anarchist affinity to internationalism manifested in their critique of patriotism and militarism, migrant solidarity and creation of more than a few international anarchist organizations, such as International Working People's Association.

=== International Workingmen's Association ===
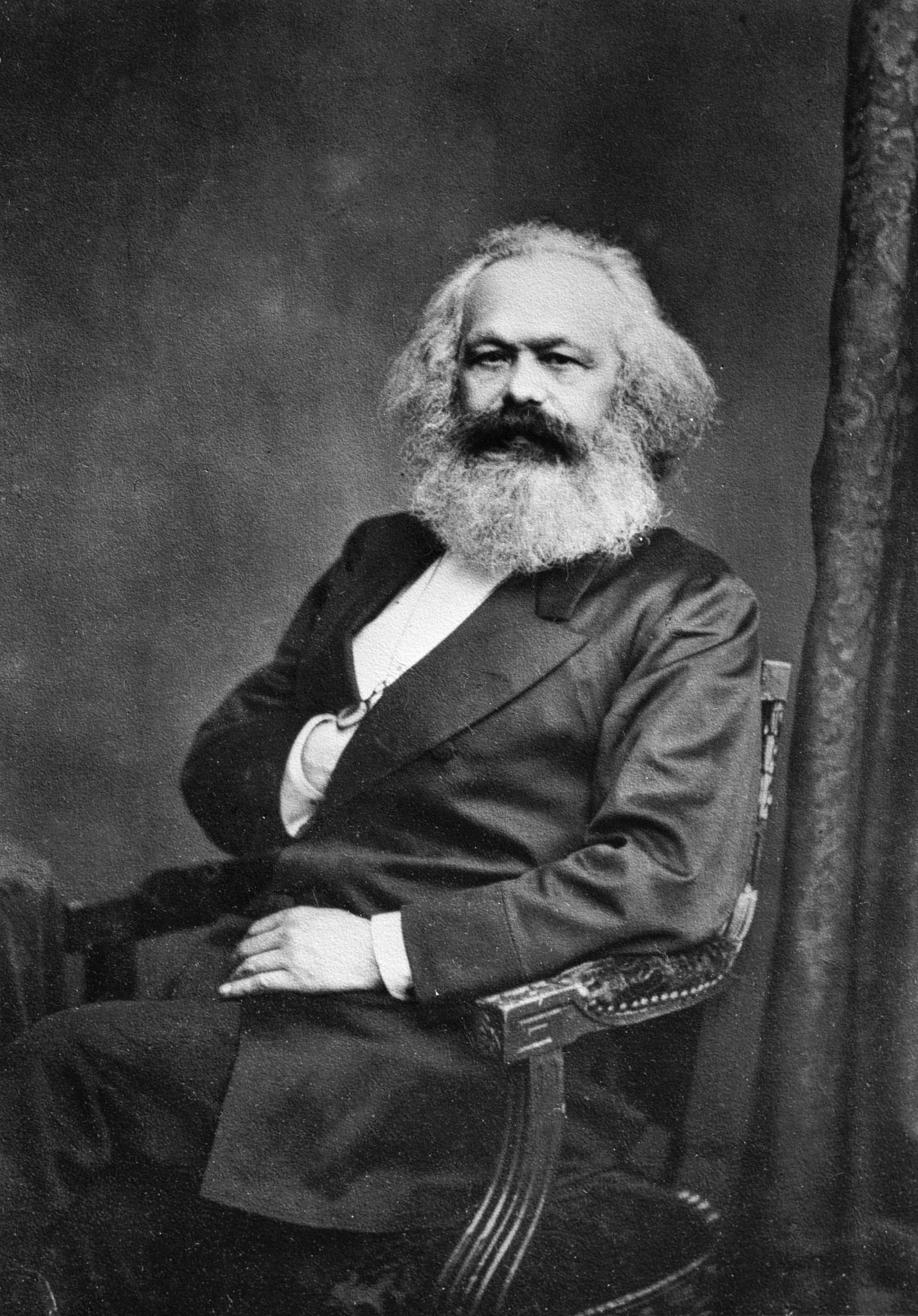
Karl Marx was a prominent member of the First International, who drafted many of their pamphlets and statements.

The International Workingmen's Association, or First International, was an organization founded in 1864, composed of various working class radicals and trade unionists who promoted an ideology of internationalist socialism and anti-imperialism. Figures such as Karl Marx and anarchist revolutionary Mikhail Bakunin would play prominent roles in the First International. The Inaugural Address of the First International, written by Marx in October 1864 and distributed as a pamphlet, contained calls for international cooperation between working people, and condemnations of the imperialist policies of national aggression undertaken by the governments of Europe:

If the emancipation of the working classes requires their fraternal concurrence, how are they to fulfill that great mission with a foreign policy in pursuit of criminal designs, playing upon national prejudices, and squandering in piratical wars the people's blood and treasure?

By the mid-1870s, splits within the International over tactical and ideological questions would lead to the organization's demise and pave the way for the formation of the Second International in 1889. One faction, with Marx as the figurehead, argued that workers and radicals must work within parliaments in order to win political supremacy and create a worker's government. The other major faction were the anarchists, led by Bakunin, who saw all state institutions as inherently oppressive, and thus opposed any parliamentary activity and believed that workers action should be aimed at the total destruction of the state.

=== Socialist International ===
The Socialist International, known as the Second International, was founded in 1889 after the disintegration of the International Workingmen's Association. Unlike the First International, it was a federation of socialist political parties from various countries, including both reformist and revolutionary groupings. The parties of the Second International were the first socialist parties to win mass support among the working class and have representatives elected to parliaments. These parties, such as the German Social-Democratic Labor Party, were the first socialist parties in history to emerge as serious political players on the parliamentary stage, often gaining millions of members.

Ostensibly committed to peace and anti-imperialism, the International Socialist Congress held its final meeting in Basel, Switzerland in 1912, in anticipation of the outbreak of World War I. The manifesto adopted at the Congress outlined the Second International's opposition to the war and its commitment to a speedy and peaceful resolution:

If a war threatens to break out, it is the duty of the working classes and their parliamentary representatives in the countries involved supported by the coordinating activity of the International Socialist Bureau to exert every effort in order to prevent the outbreak of war by the means they consider most effective, which naturally vary according to the sharpening of the class struggle and the sharpening of the general political situation. In case war should break out anyway it is their duty to intervene in favor of its speedy termination and with all their powers to utilize the economic and political crisis created by the war to arouse the people and thereby to hasten the downfall of capitalist class rule.

Despite this, when the war began in 1914, the majority of the Socialist parties of the International turned on each other and sided with their respective governments in the war effort, betraying their internationalist values and leading to the dissolution of the Second International. This betrayal led the few anti-war delegates left within the Second International to organize the International Socialist Conference at Zimmerwald, Switzerland in 1915. Known as the Zimmerwald Conference, its purpose was to formulate a platform of opposition to the war. The conference was unable to reach agreement on all points, but ultimately was able to publish the Zimmerwald Manifesto, which was drafted by Leon Trotsky. The most left-wing and stringently internationalist delegates at the conference were organized around Lenin and the Russian Social Democrats, and known as the Zimmerwald Left. They bitterly condemned the war and what they described as the hypocritical "social-chauvinists" of the Second International, who so quickly abandoned their internationalist principles and refused to oppose the war. The Zimmerwald Left resolutions urged all socialists who were committed to the internationalist principles of socialism to struggle against the war and commit to international workers' revolution.

The perceived betrayal of the social-democrats and the organization of the Zimmerwald Left would ultimately set the stage for the emergence of the world's first modern communist parties and the formation of the Third International in 1919.

=== Communist International ===
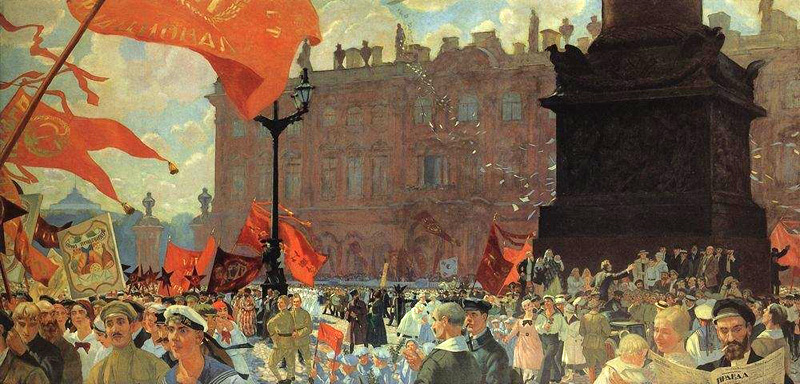
Boris Kustodiyev. Festival of the II Congress of Comintern on the Uritsky Square (former Palace square) in Petrograd

The Communist International, also known as the Comintern or the Third International, was formed in 1919 in the wake of the Russian Revolution, the end of the first World War, and the dissolution of the Second International. It was an association of communist political parties from throughout the world dedicated to proletarian internationalism and the revolutionary overthrow of the world bourgeoisie. The Manifesto of the Communist International, written by Leon Trotsky, describes the political orientation of the Comintern as "against imperialist barbarism, against monarchy, against the privileged estates, against the bourgeois state and bourgeois property, against all kinds and forms of class or national oppression".

=== Fourth International ===
The fourth and final socialist international was founded by Leon Trotsky and his followers in 1938 in opposition to the Third International and the direction taken by the USSR under the leadership of Joseph Stalin. The Fourth International declared itself to be the true ideological successor of the original Comintern under Lenin, carrying on the banner of proletarian internationalism which had been abandoned by Stalin's Comintern. A variety of still active left-wing political organizations claim to be the contemporary successors of Trotsky's original Fourth International.

=== Internationalism in practice ===
They fear, in a word, that Soviet America will become the counterpart of what they have been told Soviet Russia looks like. Actually American soviets will be as different from the Russian soviets as the United States of President Roosevelt differs from the Russian Empire of Czar Nicholas II. Yet communism can come in America only through revolution, just as independence and democracy came in America.

— Trotsky on If America Should Go Communist in 1934.

The 4th World Congress of the Communist International established the legal framework for internationalist collaboration and the foundation of agricultural and industrial communes within the USSR. Up until World War II, between seventy and eighty thousand internationalist-minded workers moved to the Soviet Union from abroad. The call for internationalist solidarity attracted settlers from countries such as Austria, Czechoslovakia, Denmark, Estonia, Germany, Italy, Sweden, Uruguay and the United States. One of first communes was formed by 123 workers of the Ford Motor Company's Highland Park factory. Led by the Detroit-based engineer Arthur Adams (1885–1969) the cooperative arrived in 1921 to set up the first automobile plant of the USSR (Likhachev Plant) in the vicinity of Moscow. While most communes were short-lived and disbanded by 1927, others such as Interhelpo, an internationalist commune founded 1923 by Ido-speakers in Czechoslovakia, played an important role in the industrialization and urbanization of Soviet Central Asia. By 1932, the Frunze-based cooperative comprised members from 14 different ethnicities who had developed an organic pathwork working language referred to as "spontánne esperanto". Being a product of the New Economic Policy, after Stalin's Great Break, most internationalist communes operating in the USSR were either shut down or collectivized.

=== Literature and criticism ===
In his work Banal Nationalism, critic Michael Billig argued internationalism was borne out of the rise of nationalism, and rejects attempts to counterpose the two. He writes: "An outward-looking element of internationalism is part of nationalism and has accompanied the rise of nationalism historically. When US presidents, today, claim to speak simultaneously on behalf of their nation and a new world order, they are not placing, side by side in the same utterance, elements from two, clearly separate ideologies; nor are they creating a novel synthesis from the thesis of nationalism and the antithesis of internationalism. They are using the hegemonic possibilities of nationalism [...] these possibilities are endemic in nationalist habits of thinking."

In Jacques Derrida's 1993 work, Specters of Marx: The State of the Debt, the Work of Mourning and the New International, he uses Shakespeare's Hamlet to frame a discussion of the history of the International, ultimately proposing his own vision for a "New International" that is less reliant on large-scale international organizations. As he puts it, the New International should be "without status ... without coordination, without party, without country, without national community, without co-citizenship, without common belonging to a class."

Through Derrida's use of Hamlet, he shows the influence that Shakespeare had on Marx and Engel's work on internationalism. In his essay, "Big Leagues: Specters of Milton and Republican International Justice between Shakespeare and Marx", Christopher N. Warren makes the case that English poet John Milton also had a substantial influence on Marx and Engel's work. Paradise Lost, in particular, shows "the possibility of political actions oriented toward international justice founded outside the aristocratic order." Marx and Engels, Warren claims, understood the empowering potential of Miltonic republican traditions for forging international coalitions—a lesson, perhaps, for "The New International."

== Fascist internationalism ==
With the rise of fascism, fascist states began pursuing wider international networks in the 1930s and during World War II. Fascist internationalism included transnational institutions such as the e Fasci Italiani all’Estero and the National Socialist Auslandsorganisationen. While in Japan, fascist internationalism developed through the presentation of the puppet-state of Manchukuo as a utopian modern-state, with a relationship with Japan similar to American relations to Mexico and the Caribbean.

By the 1940s, fascist internationalism developed new institutions in pursuit of spreading fascist corporatism across the planet. The fascist states of Europe that had signed onto the Tripartite Pact were thus billed as part of a new order stemming from Europe based in Italy and Germany with strong ties to Japan.

== Other uses ==
- In a less restricted sense, internationalism is a word describing the impetus and motivation for the creation of any international organizations. The earliest such example of broad internationalism would be the drive to replace feudal systems of measurement with the metric system, long before the creation of international organizations like the World Court, the League of Nations and the United Nations.
- In linguistics, an internationalism is a loanword that, originating in one language, has been borrowed by most other languages. Examples of such borrowings include OK, microscope and tokamak.

== See also ==
- Anti-globalization movement
- Anti-imperialism
- Bahá'í International Community
- Communist International
- Cosmopolitanism
- Cross-culturalism
- Democratic globalization
- Fourth International
- Global Citizens Movement
- Global justice
- Global village
- Globalisation
- International community
- International Workingmen's Association
- "Yank" Levy
- Multilateralism
- Neoconservatism
- New Internationalist
- Pan-Islamism
- Second International
- Transnationalism
- World communism
- World community
- World Federalism
