= Carl Heinrich Hertwig =

German veterinarian

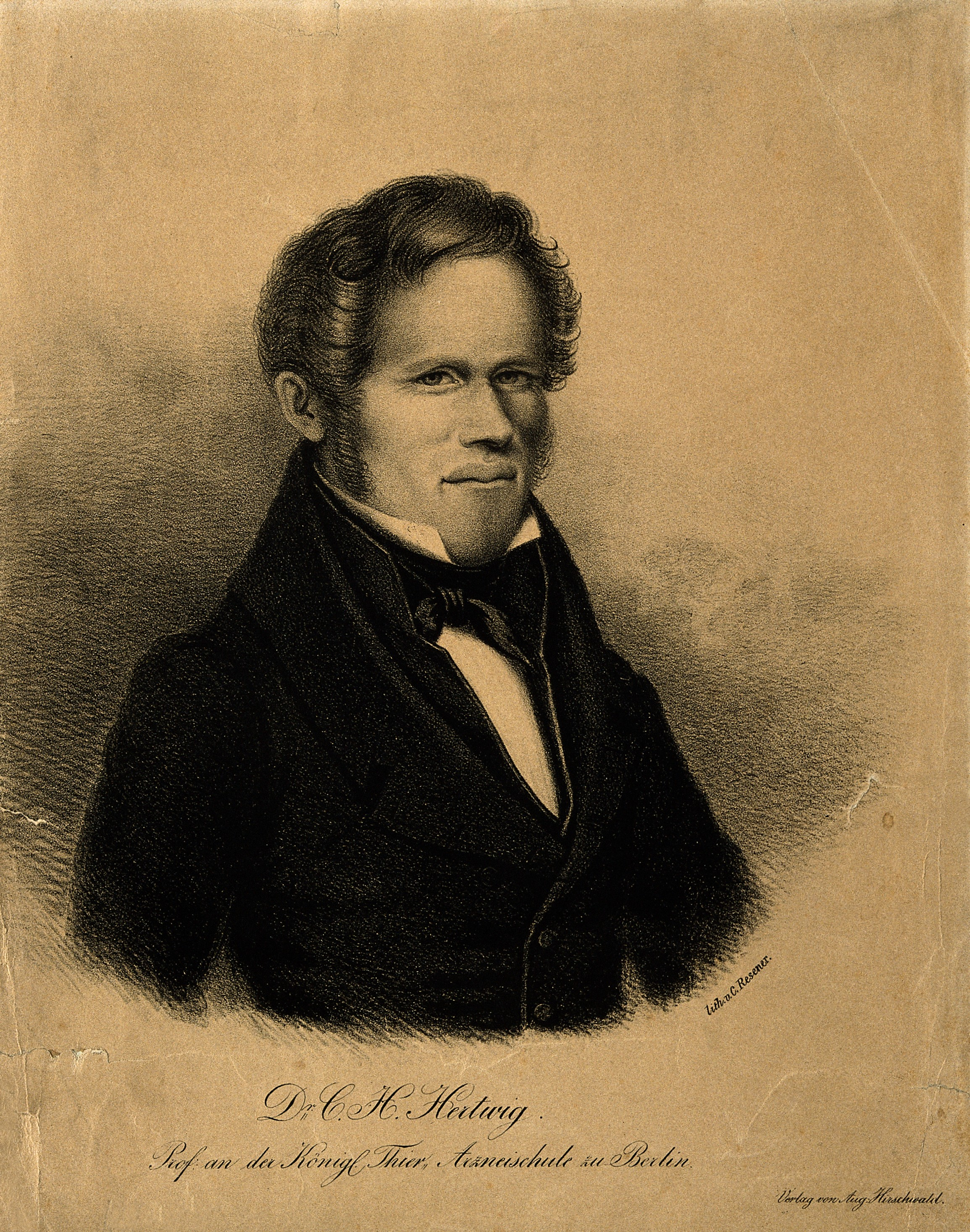
Portrait

Carl Heinrich Hertwig (10 January 1798 in Ohlau – 19 July 1881 in Berlin) was a German veterinarian.

Beginning in 1817 he studied medicine at the Royal Surgical Institute in Breslau, and afterwards studied veterinary medicine at schools in Vienna and Munich. Following an educational trip that took him through Germany, Switzerland, France, England and the Netherlands, he worked as a repetitor at the Thierarzneischule (veterinary school) in Berlin (from 1823). In 1826 he received his doctorate, and later on, was appointed a senior instructor (1829) and professor (1833) at the Thierarzneischule in Berlin. In 1845 he conducted research of rinderpest in Bohemia and southern Russia.

With Ernst Friedrich Gurlt, he was editor of the Magazin für die gesamte Tierheilkunde ("Magazine for the entirety of veterinary medicine", 1835–1874).

== Selected works ==
- Beiträge zur nähern Kenntniss der Wuthkrankheit; oder, Tollheit der Hunde, 1829 – Contributions to the knowledge of hydrophobia, or, madness of dogs.
- Die Krankheiten der Hunde und deren Heilung (1853); translated into French and published as Les maladies des chiens et leur traitement (1860) – Diseases of dogs and their treatment.
- Thierärztliche Receptirkunde und Pharmakopöe nebst einer Sammlung bewährter Heilformeln, 1856 (edited with Carl Gottlieb Heinrich Erdmann) – Veterinary prescriptions and pharmacopoeia, along with a collection of healing formulas.
- Handbuch der praktischen Arzneimittellehre für Thierärzte, 1872 – Manual of practical medicine for veterinary surgeons.
