= Basel manifesto =

The Manifesto of the International Socialist Congress at Basel, or simply known as the Basel manifesto, was an anti-war declaration unanimously adopted by the Second International at an extraordinary congress held in Basel, Switzerland, on November 24–25, 1912. The manifesto called on the international proletariat to conduct an "unrelenting struggle" against war and those responsible for it, the ruling classes of the capitalist countries, in response to the risk of world war triggered by the First Balkan War. The document reaffirmed the anti-militarist resolutions of the 1907 Stuttgart Congress and declared that the fear of the ruling class of a proletarian revolution as a result of a world war has proved to be an essential guarantee of peace. This was the last final, joint peace demonstration of the international workers' movement before the First World War, and the manifesto became a key reference point for socialist opposition to World War I when it broke out in 1914.

Karl Kautsky’s writings between 1902 and 1909 strongly influenced Vladimir Lenin’s perspective. Lenin regarded the Basel Manifesto as the practical expression of this vision and as a summary of revolutionary Social Democracy’s message. The scenario outlined by Kautsky and the commitments of the Basel Manifesto became integral parts of the Bolshevik outlook before and during the First World War, shaping Lenin's insistence on continuity with the pre-war consensus of revolutionary Marxism. Lenin's close collaborator Grigory Zinoviev later emphasized that the Basel Manifesto explicitly rejected any notion of “defensive war” or “defending the fatherland,” instead calling for civil war and revolutionary struggle in the event of conflict. He described it as “better than Stuttgart” and “a slap in the face” to the wartime stance of the Second International's leadership.

The Bolshevik Party in particular remained faithful to the resolutions of the Second International. In the Duma, Bolshevik deputy Aleksei Badayev declared that the working class would “oppose the war with all its force” and recalled that the Basel manifesto had bound socialists to wage a determined struggle against imperialist conflict. He proclaimed the Bolshevik slogan of “war against war,” pledging that every member of their fraction would resist the war by all means available.

== Legacy ==
The Basel Manifesto became a foundational text for revolutionary communist theory, with Lenin repeatedly citing it in works like "Opportunism, and the Collapse of the Second International" (1915) as representing "the fullest, most precise, and solemn expression of socialist views on war and on the tactics of socialists in regard to war". Lenin used the manifesto to expose the "hypocritical pretentions" of socialist leaders who supported World War I, reminding readers of "the solemn promises that the leaders of the 2nd International had made at the Congress of Basel in 1912 to oppose, not just war in general but this particular imperialist war".
