= Gurltia =

Scientific classification
- Kingdom: Animalia
- Phylum: Nematoda
- Class: Chromadorea
- Order: Rhabditida
- Family: Metastrongylidae
- Genus: Gurltia; Wolffhügel, 1933
- Species: G. paralysans

Binomial name
- Gurltia paralysans Wolffhügel, 1933

Species of roundworm

Gurltia paralysans is a parasite which attaches itself to the leptomeningeal veins of South American felines It is the only species in the genus Gurltia

The genus name comes from Ernst Friedrich Gurlt (1794–1882), a German veterinarian and anatomist.
