= Hanover Congress (1899) =

The Hanover Congress of the Social Democratic Party of Germany was held between October 9–October 14, 1899, in Hanover, Prussia (now Germany).

The Congress approved a resolution titled Attacks on the Fundamental Views and Tactics of the Party that formally condemned Bernsteinist attacks on the party's policy and tactics. The official report on this matter was presented by August Bebel and was supported by the vast majority of the Congress, including Bernstein's supporters. Vladimir Lenin explained that this support came from the resolution's inability to criticise and expose Bernsteinism: "It is debatable, from the standpoint of the interests of the German party, whether diplomacy was appropriate and whether, in this case, a bad peace is better than a good quarrel".

Rosa Luxemburg also delivered a speech against Bernstein's revisionism.

== See also ==
- Stuttgart Congress
