= Karl Becker (painter) =

German painter (1820–1900)

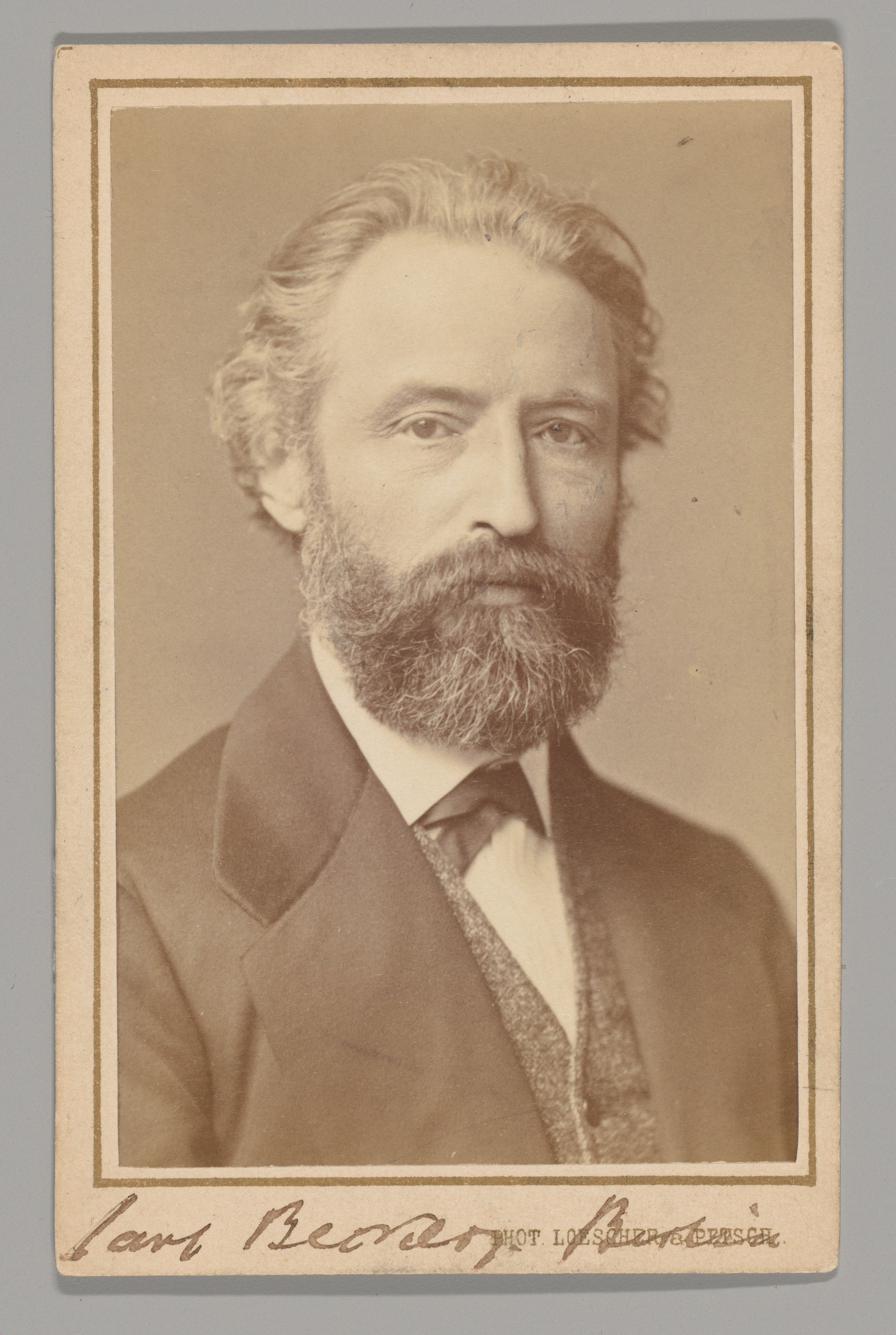
Karl Becker, 1860s

Karl Ludwig Friedrich Becker (18 December 1820 – 20 December 1900) was a German history painter and president of the Berlin Academy.

== Biography ==
Becker was born and died in Berlin. He was a pupil of August von Klöber, Peter von Cornelius, and Heinrich Maria von Hess, and afterwards studied a year in Paris, two years in Rome, and visited Venice. He first attained success with subjects of the Venetian Renaissance.

Later in life, he made many visits to Venice to study paintings drawn from life in the 15th and 16th centuries. The chief characteristics of his manner are historical fidelity, skillfulness of technique, and richness of coloring. His works include "Belisarius as a Beggar" (1850), "Jeweler at a Venetian Senator's" (1855), "Visit of Sebastian del Piombo to Titian" (1861), "Doge in Council" (1864), "Charles V and Fugger" (1870), "Dürer in Venice" (1873), "Charles V Visiting Titian" (1873), "In the Picture Gallery" (1874), "Bianca Capello" (1874), "Scene from the Marriage of Figaro" (1874), "Emperor Maximilian Receiving the Venetian Embassy" (1877), and frescos for the Neues Museum in Berlin.

== Honours ==
- 1874 : Member of the Académie royale de Belgique.

== Gallery ==
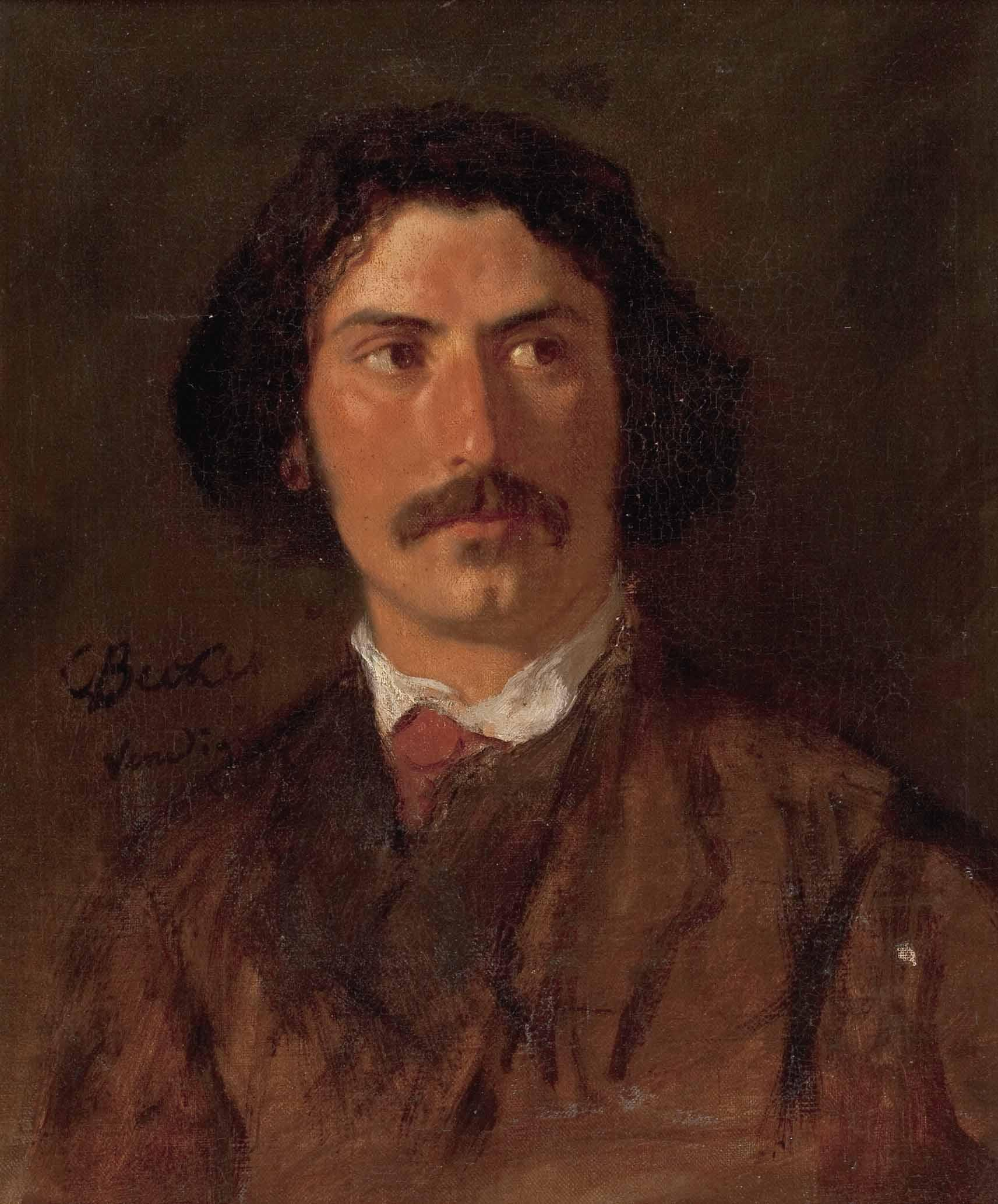

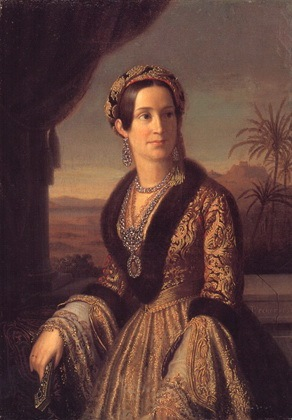

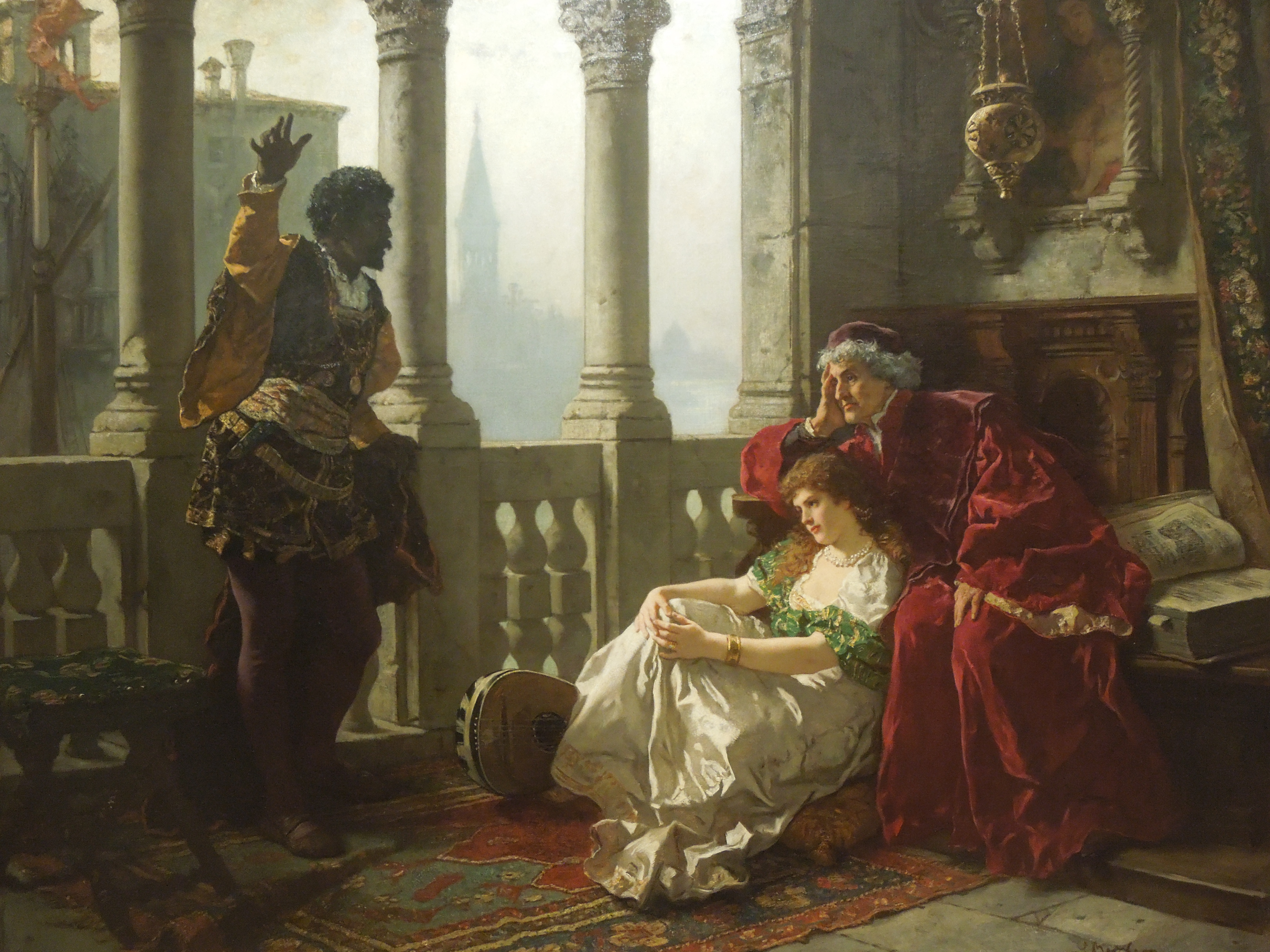

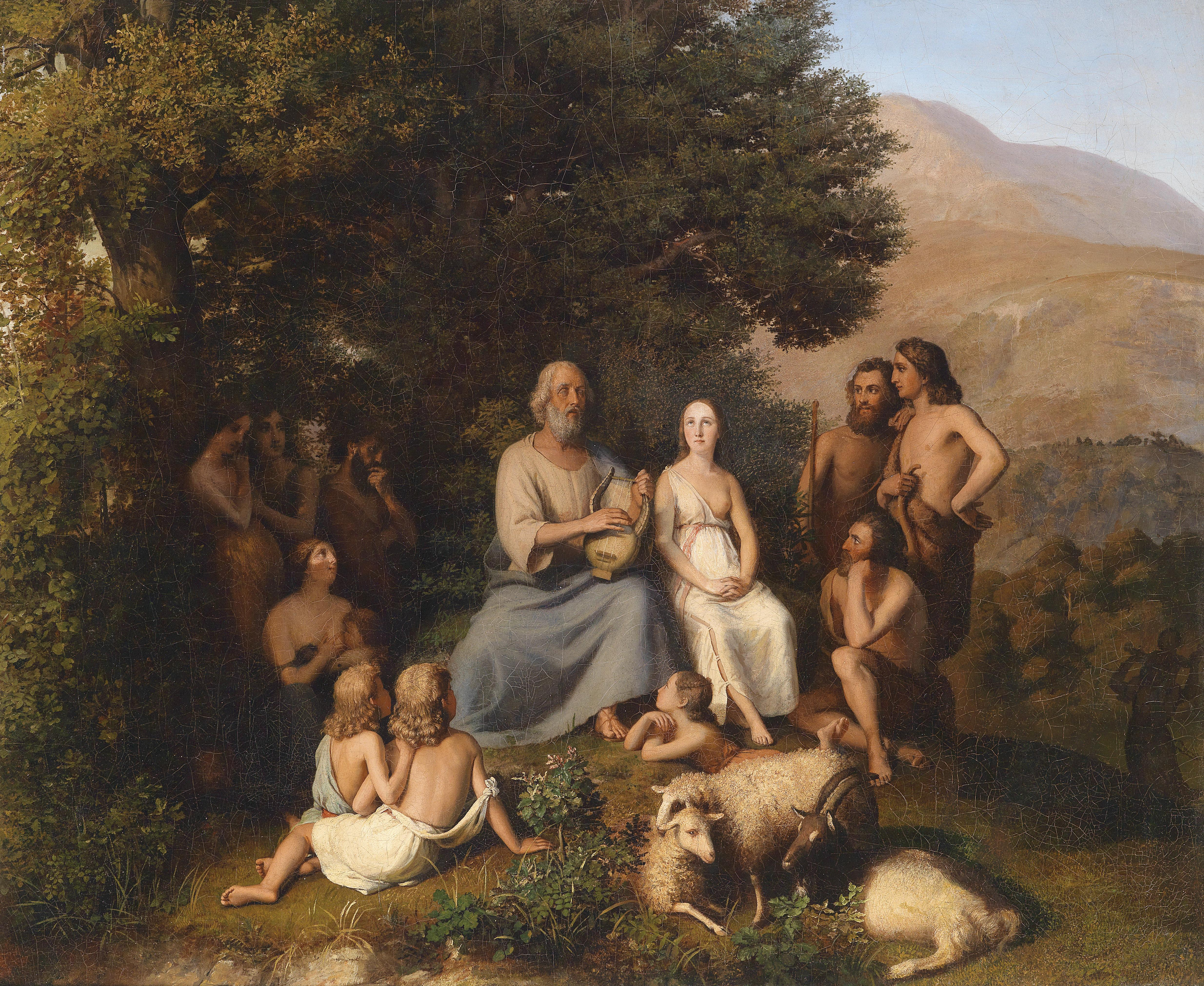

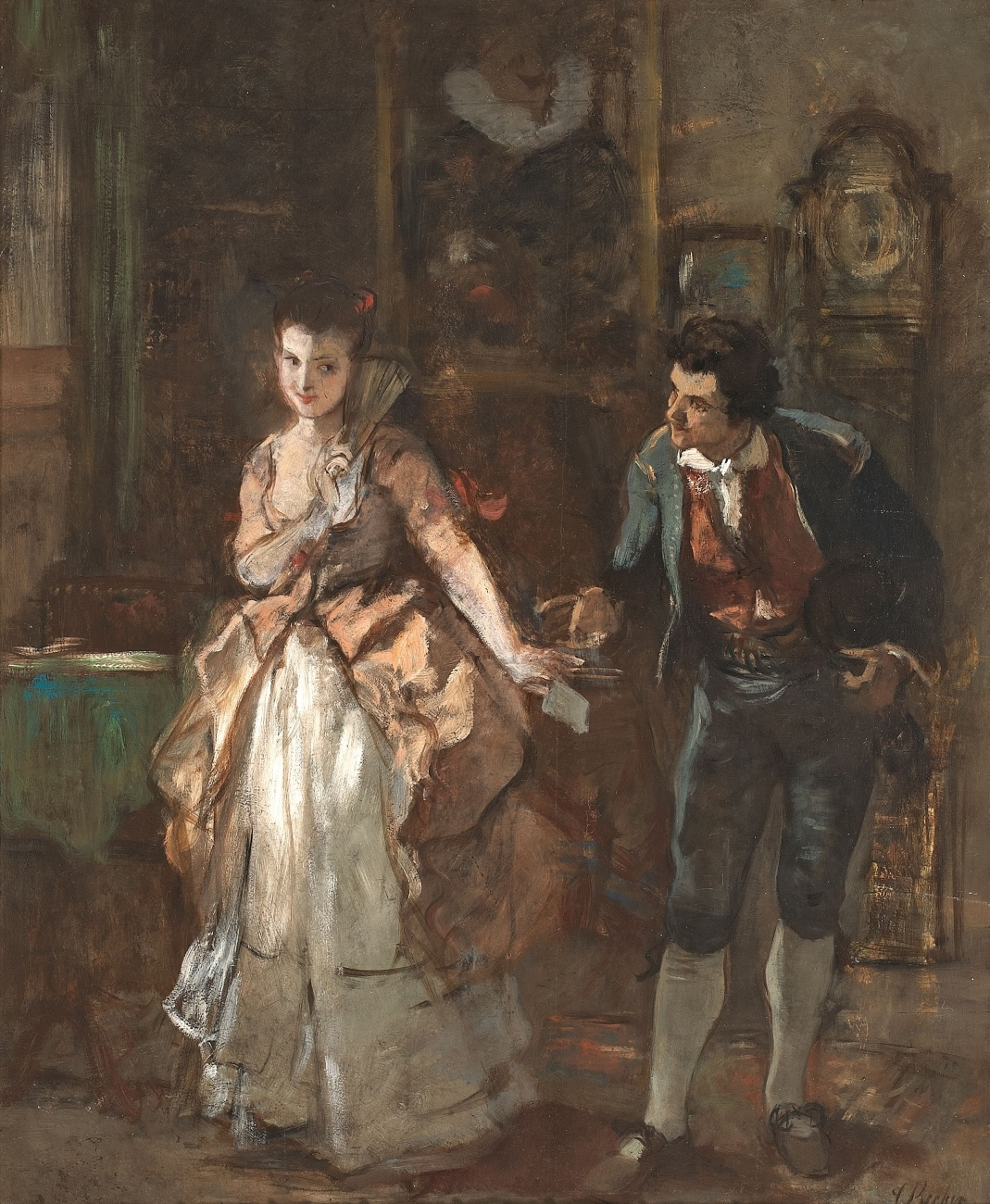

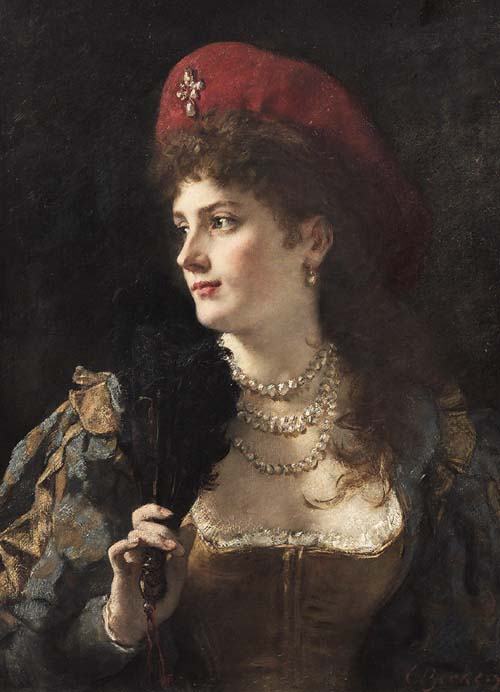

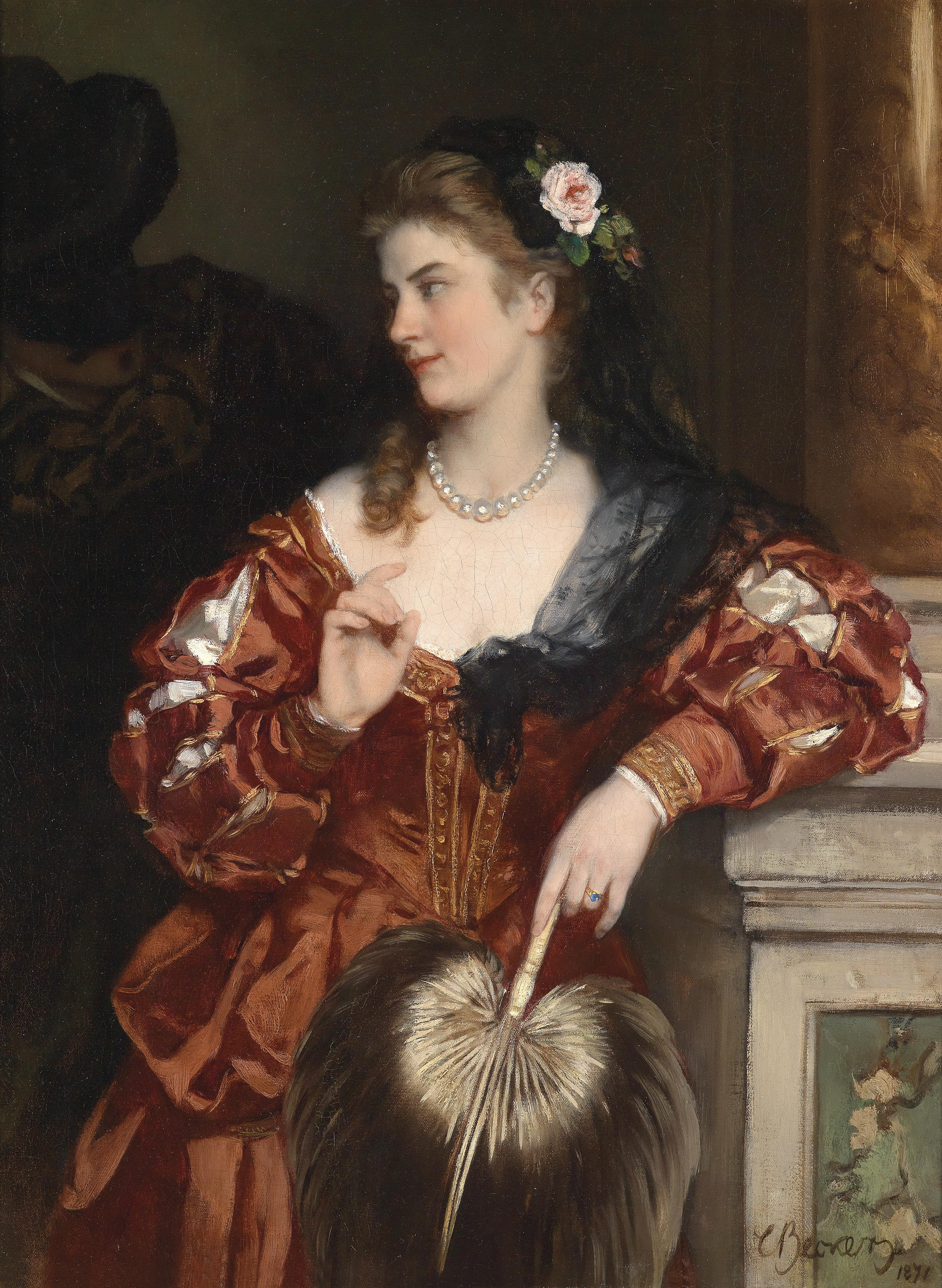

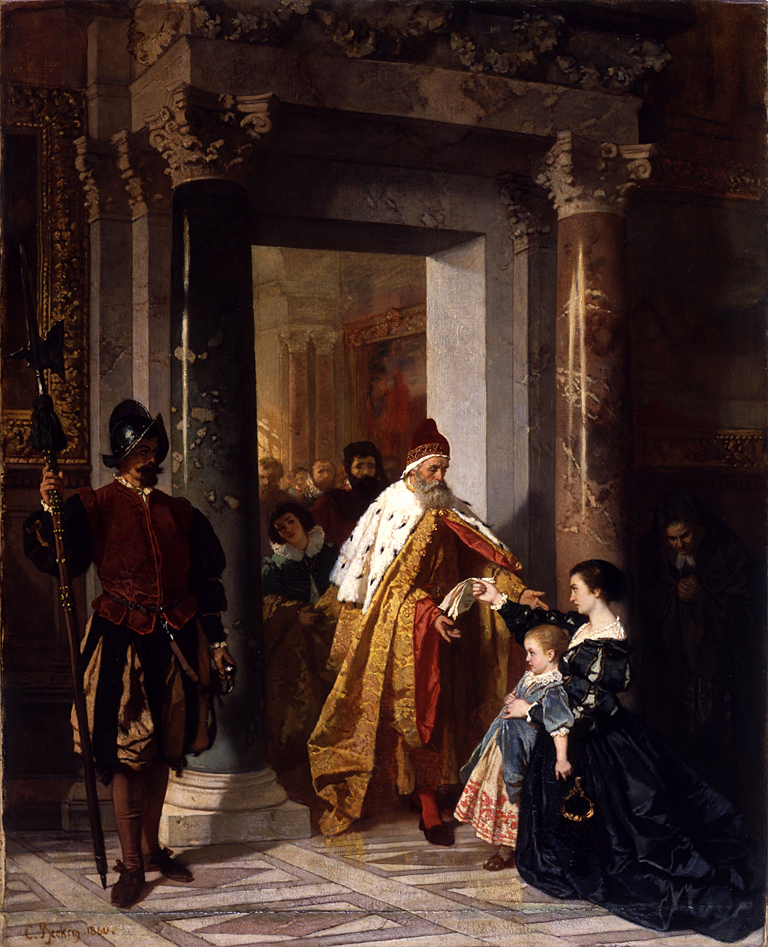

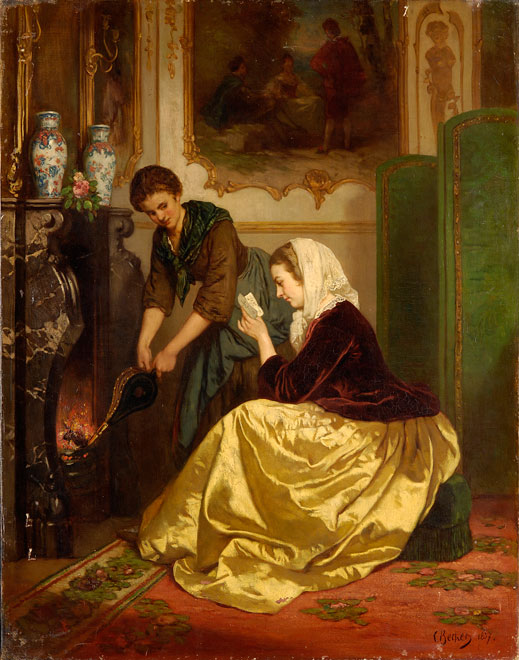

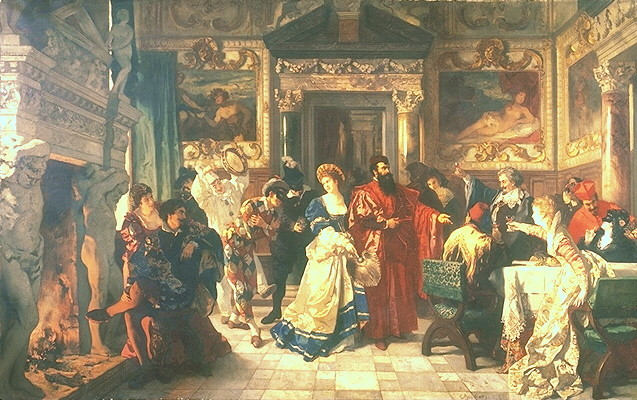

== See also ==
- List of German painters
