= Dehl =

Dehl can be both a given name and a surname. Notable people with the name include:

- Dehl Berti (born 2001), German footballer
- Laurenz Dehl (1921–1991), American actor
