= Portrait of the Painter Lovis Corinth =

Painting by Max Liebermann

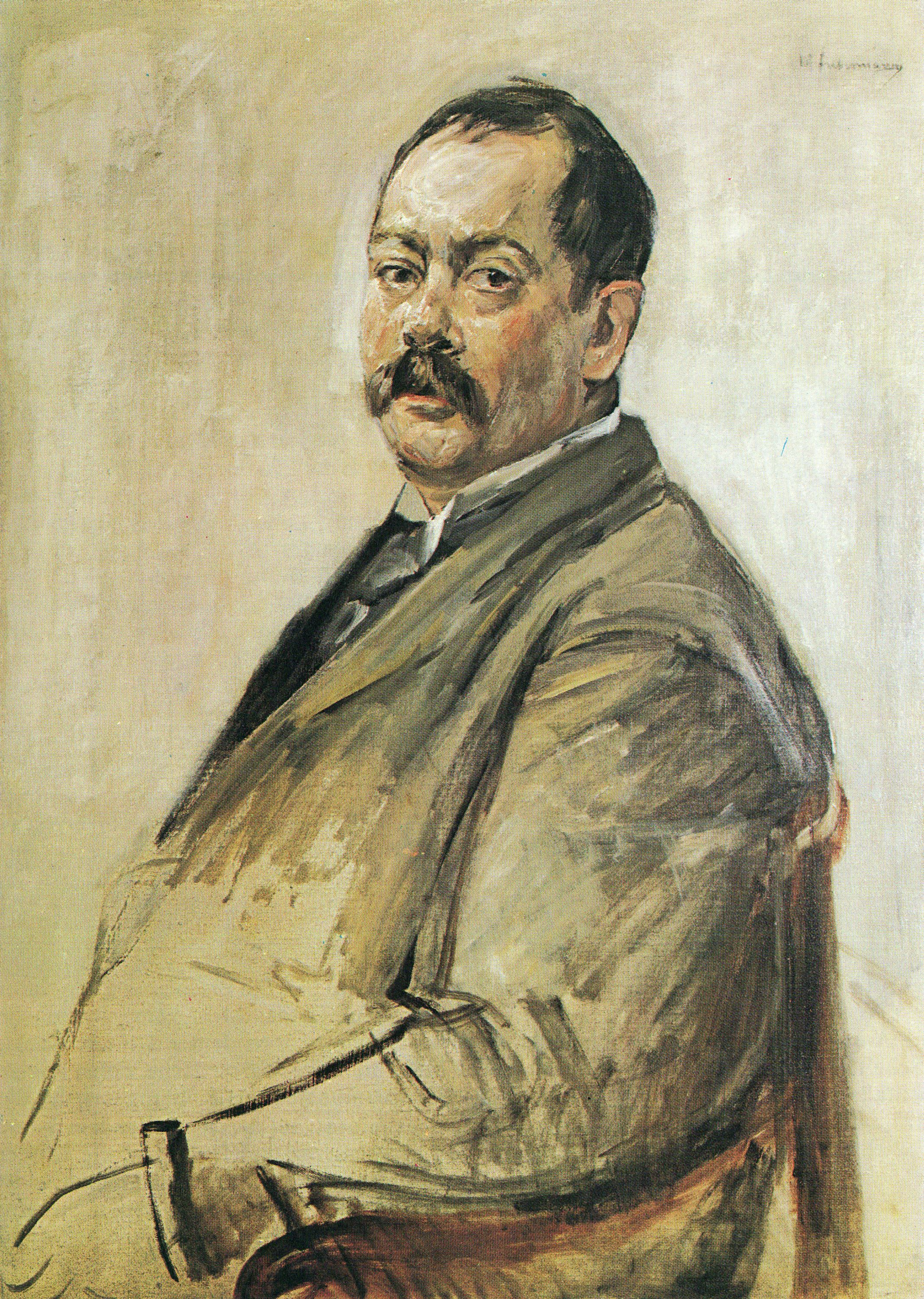
- Artist: Max Liebermann
- Year: 1899
- Medium: oil on canvas
- Movement: Impressionism
- Dimensions: 88 cm × 63 cm (35 in × 25 in)
- Location: Deutsche Bank, Frankfurt

Portrait of the Painter Lovis Corinth is an oil-on-canvas painting by the German painter Max Liebermann, created in 1899. It depicts fellow German painter Lovis Corinth in a half-length portrait. The painting is in the possession of the Deutsche Bank, in Frankfurt.

== History ==
The painting was made when Lovis Corinth was in Berlin, in 1899, to attended the first exhibition of the Berlin Secession and decided to visit Liebermann. During this visit both artists portrayed each other. After Corinth's death, Liebermann wrote in a letter to his widow Charlotte Berend-Corinth: "Your late husband painted me in my studio and then on the same day I painted him, of course to everyone's great dissatisfaction. Trübner, who was a very clever fellow, once said: 'There is no safer reason to quarrel with someone than to paint them.' Even if there are two painters."

Liebermann and Corinth later fell out; after 1911, following his resignation, Liebermann briefly chaired the Secession.

== Description ==
The painting represents fellow painter Lovis Corinth, depicted in the seated position. Corinth's body and head are seen in profile and his head is turned slightly, looking at the viewer over his left shoulder. Liebermann usually painted his models as seen from the front, with the current side portrait being an exception.

Corinth sits in a chair, which he fills entirely, resting his left arm on the armrest. He is wearing a gray jacket with a white collar shirt underneath and a dark tie. The body is only hinted at, so the painting accordingly focuses on his face with the prominent mustache and in his shoulders.

In comparison to Corinth's self-portrayals, Liebermann does not portray him as a "rustic strongman", but rather as someone "who avoids a direct confrontation with the other person." Sigrid Achenbach and Matthias Eberle further describe: "The mighty body serves him here more as a protective shield behind which he hides than as an instrument of his vitality."

As with most of Liebermann's portraits, the background is depicted neutral and in iridescent grey. The canvas is signed in the upper right corner with the name M. Liebermann.
