= Aryeh Leo Olitzki =

Israeli bacteriologist

Aryeh Leo Olitzki אריה ליאו אוליצקי
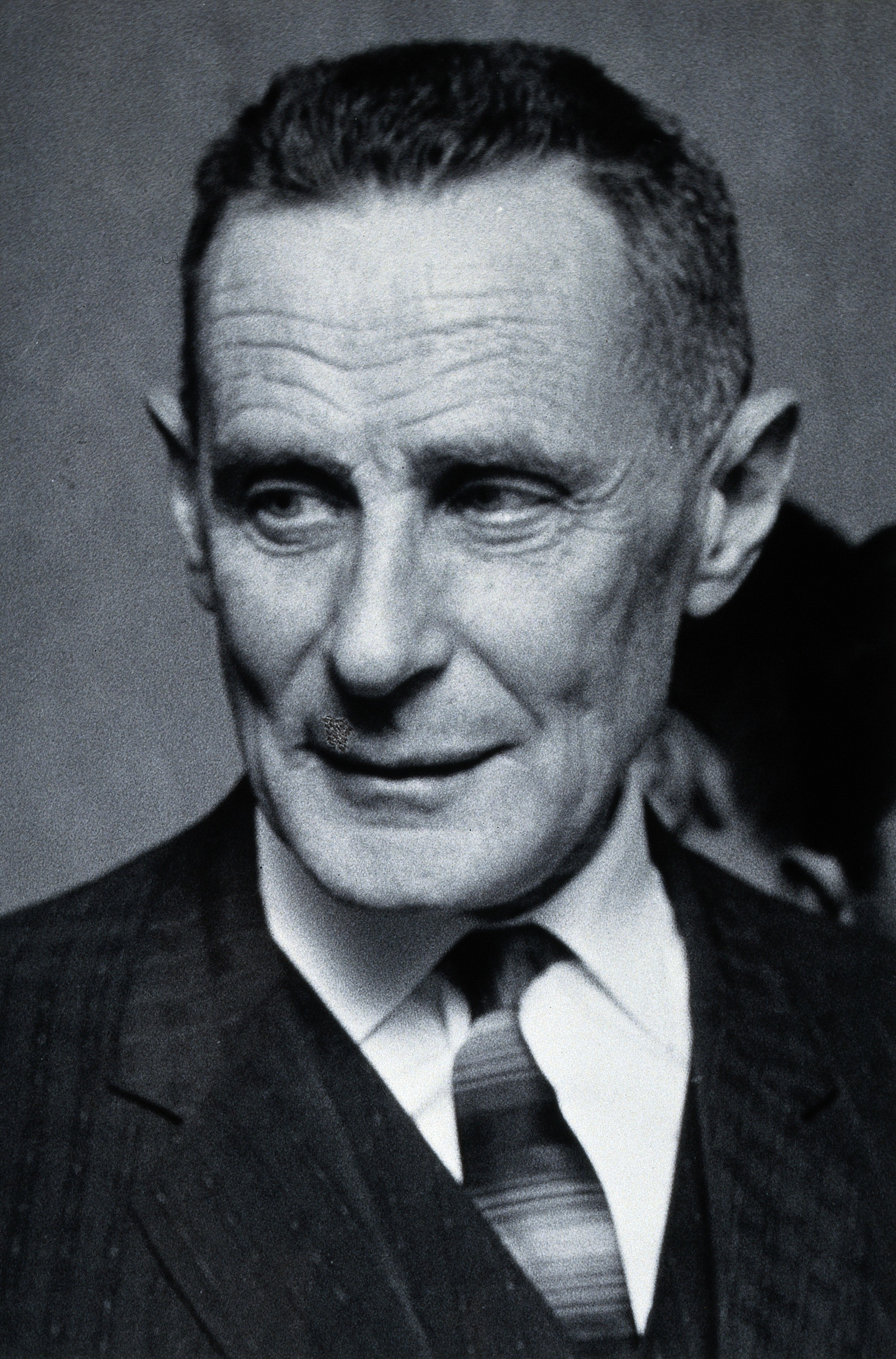
- Born: 4 June 1898; Allenstein, East Prussia, Germany
- Died: 13 February 1983 (aged 84); Israel
- Citizenship: Israeli
- Awards: Israel Prize (1967)

Aryeh Leo Olitzki (Hebrew: אריה ליאו אוליצקי; 4 June 1898 – 13 February 1983) was an Israeli bacteriologist.

== Biography ==
Aryeh Olitzki was born in 1898 in Allenstein, East Prussia, Germany (now Olsztyn, Poland). He studied medicine at the universities of Berlin and Breslau, and was appointed assistant at the Institute of Hygiene of the University of Breslau, from where he obtained his doctorate.

In 1924, he immigrated to Mandate Palestine.

Olitzki headed the bacteriology laboratories at the Hadassah Hospital, Jerusalem and in Safed. In 1928, he joined the faculty of the Hebrew University of Jerusalem, and became a professor in 1949, and dean of the Medical School from 1961 to 1965.

== Awards and recognition ==
- In 1967, Olitzki was awarded the Israel Prize, in medicine.
- Olitzki Street in Beersheba is named after him.

== Published works ==
- Yesodot Torat ha-Ḥaidakkim ve-ha-Ḥasinut (A. L. Olitzki and N. Grossowicz), a textbook on microbiology and immunology in two volumes (1964–68)

== See also ==
- List of Israel Prize recipients
