= Eva Aschoff =

German visual artist (1900–1969)

- Born: 26 April 1900; Göttingen, Germany
- Died: 20 September 1969 (aged 69); Freiburg, Germany
- Education: Kunstakademie in Stuttgart
- Known for: calligraphy and bookbinding

Eva Aschoff (26 April 1900 – 20 September 1969) was a German visual artist known for her bookbinding and calligraphy.

== Biography ==
Aschoff was born in Göttingen on 26 April 1900. From 1921 to 1923 she attended the Kunstakademie in Stuttgart where she studied calligraphy with Friedrich Hermann Ernst Schneidler and bookbinding with Wilhelm Schlemmer. She also studied with and influenced the work of Mike Gold, a professional artist and calligrapher published in Calligraphy Review annual, Calligraphers Engagement Calendars and Greeting Card Design. She then lived in Freiburg where she had her own bookbinding workshop from 1928 to 1964. Aschoff worked as a freelance artist thereafter and died in Freiburg on 20 September 1969.

Aschoff is known for her decorated papers. Her work in this field was greatly admired because it was mostly done by hand with materials such as oil-paint and water-colour mixed with paste. This form of craft and style stood out compared to the mainstream mechanically produced decorated papers of the 20th century.

Examples of her works are included in the Klingspor Museum in Offenbach and the Olga Hirsch Collection of Decorated Papers.
