= Ernst Friedrich Löhndorff =

German sailor, adventurer and writer

Ernst Friedrich Löhndorff (13 March 1899 – 16 March 1976) was a German sailor, adventurer, and writer. He was born in Frankfurt am Main and died in Waldshut-Tiengen.

In 1913, at the age of 14, Löhndorff ran away from home with the intent of becoming a sailor and exploring the world. He traveled the globe as a sailor and adventurer until 1927, the year he published his first novel, Bestie Ich in Mexiko ("I, Beast, in Mexico"). His novels were translated into a dozen languages. His books were reprinted in 2017 by Cassiopeia-XXX-Press.

== Biography ==
=== Childhood and youth ===
Löhndorff was the youngest child of the merchant Robert Löhndorff and his wife, Pauline Auguste (née Rabe). Löhndorff was born on the 13th of March 1899, and baptized on 27 August 1899 in Frankfurt. In 1902, his family moved to Vienna. His father was often absent due to business travels and later left the family.

Starting on 16 September 1905, Löhndorff attended the Volksschule (elementary school) in Hietzing and later the public Realschule (secondary modern school). In 1912, he had to repeat the grade due to excessive absences.

=== Seamanship ===
In the spring of 1913, Löhndorff ran away from home to become a sailor. In Hamburg, he signed on to a Dutch sailing ship as a cabin boy. After a journey to Finland and Russia, he returned to the harbor of Delfzijl in the Netherlands to discover his father and the local police were already expecting him.

After a discussion, Löhndorff's father agreed to let him pursue a career as a sailor. He was hired on the four-masted barque Thielbek, which was sailing to Mexico. At the end of September 1914, the ship reached its destination, where it was seized due to the outbreak of the First World War. Bored and restless on the seized vessel, Löhndorff fled and embarked on adventures in Mexico.

=== First World War ===
Löhndorff fled from the seized vessel after a short time because he was bored and eager to pursue his quest for adventure. He worked in various jobs, including as a coastal sailor.

After a shipwreck, Löhndorff sought help from the German consul in Guaymas. However, as he couldn't provide documents and his family resided in Austria, the consul did not believe he was German. After leaving the consulate, Löhndorff met a Yaqui member of the Revolutionary Forces and enlisted with them. He was quickly promoted, partly because he could translate English texts for his superiors. During this time, he met the revolutionary Pancho Villa.

Löhndorff was not initially interested in the political issues behind the revolution. In January 1916, he witnessed revolutionary troops seize 17 US civilians from a train and, under orders from Pancho Villa, execute them on the spot; that moment changed Löhndorff's perspective. However, because he was present at the scene and was involved in the situation, the US placed a bounty on his head. A punitive expedition led by General John Pershing was launched but did not accomplish its goal, as the troops were ordered to return in 1917 when the US entered the First World War.

=== War captivity ===
Löhndorff tried to escape from Mexico. He got help from some deserting sailors, and they were able to capture the Alexander Agassiz, which they sailed under the German flag. The US Marines captured the ship after four weeks. Löhndorff was arrested at El Paso, Texas on October 31, 1917. He was transferred in December, 1917, to War Prison Barracks III at Fort Douglas, Utah as interned civilian No. 638. During his imprisonment, Löhndorff met Captain Conrad Sörensen, whose sailor classes Löhndorff attended.

After the war, Löhndorff managed to obtain provisional documents through the Swiss Legation, which allowed him to leave the United States and return to Europe. On 11 July 1919, Löhndorff arrived at the port of Rotterdam as a passenger aboard the Martha Washington. German authorities were waiting for him there, but allowed him to enter Germany after several interrogations. He traveled to Karlsruhe, where his family had settled during the war.

=== French Foreign Legion ===
In the post-war years, Löhndorff joined the French Foreign Legion. The reasons for his decision remain unclear. He may have joined due to financial problems or simply to satisfy his urge for adventure. On 13 November 1920, he enlisted for five years in Saarbrücken, using the false name "Ernesto de Naca e Villaverde" and claiming a false birthplace of Veracruz, but he provided his real birth date of 13 March 1899.

He seems to have been in Algeria but deserted after only two months and fled the country. His book Afrika weint - Tagebuch eines Legionärs ("Africa Cries: The Diary of a Legionnaire") reflects his experiences in the Foreign Legion in Africa. However, similarly to other books he wrote, this adventure novel blends real events with fiction. His autobiographical style often gives the impression that Löhndorff is reporting his own adventures even when he isn't. Nevertheless, his travels and adventures were a significant source of inspiration for his stories.

== Publications ==
The following bibliography lists the first editions of his novels as provided in the Catalogue of the German National Library. Some of the crime novels he published under the pseudonym Peter Dando were later republished under his real name.

- Bestie Ich in Mexiko (1927) Stuttgart: Dieck & Co.
- Satan Ozean: Von Schnapspiraten, Trampfahren und Walfängern (1930) Leipzig: Grethlein & Co.; Bremen: C. Schünemann
- Afrika weint: Tagebuch eines Legionärs (1930) Leipzig: Grethlein & Co.
- Amineh: Die zehntausend Gesichter Indiens (1931) Leipzig; Zürich: Grethlein; Bremen: Schünemann
- Noahs Arche: Eine Saga von Mensch und Wal (1932) Leipzig; Zürich: Grethlein; Bremen: Schünemann
- Blumenhölle am Jacinto: Urwalderlebnis (1932) Leipzig; Zürich: Grethlein; Bremen: Schünemann
- Der Indio: Kampf und Ende eines Volkes (1933) Bremen: Schünemann
- Trommle, Piet!: Deutsche Landsknechte im Urwald (1934) Bremen: Schünemann
- Gold, Whisky und Frauen in Nordland (1935) Bremen: Schünemann
- Der Narr und die Mandelblüte (1935) Bremen: Schünemann
- Südwest-Nordost: Erlebnisschildergn (1936) Bremen: Schünemann
- Tropensymphonie (1936) Bremen: Schünemann
- Der Geheimnisvolle von Baden-Baden (1936) Bern; Leipzig; Wien: Goldmann (Goldmanns Roman-Bibliothek, Band 54); as Peter Dando
- Seltsame Pfade auf 10 Grad Süd (1937) Bremen: Schünemann
- Bowery-Satan (1937) Bern; Leipzig; Wien: Goldmann (Goldmanns Roman-Bibliothek; Band 69); as Peter Dando
- Die Frau von Hawai (1938) Bremen: Schünemann
- Unheimliches China: Ein Reisebericht (1939) Bremen: Schünemann
- Die schwarze Witwe (1939) Dresden: Seyfert; as Peter Dando
- Yangtsekiang: Ein Chinaroman (1940) Bremen: Schünemann
- Khaiberpaß (1941) Bremen: Schünemann
- Gloria und der Teddyboy: Amerik. Sittenbild (1943) Bremen: Schünemann
- Old Jamaica Rum (1949) Düsseldorf: Vier Falken Verl.
- Ultima Esperanza: Aufstieg und Ende des "Königs von Feuerland" (1950) Bremen: Schünemann
- Ägyptische Nächte (1952) Schloss Bleckede a.d. Elbe: Meissner
- Stimme aus der Wüste: Muhamed Ibn Abd'Allah Ibn Abd. el Mottalib Ibn Hadschim el Emin. (1953) Bremen: Schünemann
- Gelber Strom (1954) Bremen: Schünemann
- Wen die Götter streicheln: Indischer Tatsachenroman (1954) Berlin; München: Weiss
- Schwarzer Hanf: Roman eines Rauschgiftes (1956) Bremen: Schünemann
- Der Weg nach Dien Bien Phu: Roman einer Kolonie (1957) Bremen: Schünemann
- Glück in Manila (1958) Berlin-Schöneberg: Weiss
- Sturm über Kenia (1960) Bremen: Schünemann
- Gelbe Hölle am Jangtsekiang (1965) Hannover: Fackelträger-Verl. Schmidt-Küster, (1979) Prisma Verlag 200 pp. ISBN 3570004473
- Der Vogel Cockaburra (1966) Hannover: Fackelträger-Verl.

=== Translations ===
Many of Löhndorff's novels were translated into at least 12 different languages: Danish, English, French, Flemish (Belgium), Italian, Serbo-Croatian, Dutch, Polish, Spanish, Swedish, Czech, and Hungarian.
