= Ernst Friedrich Gurlt =

German veterinarian and anatomist

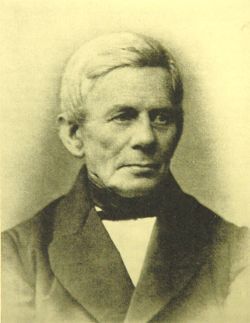
Ernst Friedrich Gurlt (1794-1882)

Ernst Friedrich Gurlt (13 October 1794 – 13 August 1882) was a German veterinarian and anatomist born in Drentkau near Grünberg, Silesia. He was the father of surgeon Ernst Julius Gurlt (1825–1899).

Initially trained as a pharmacist, he later studied medicine and anatomy. Beginning in 1819, he taught classes at the Berlin Tierarzneischule (veterinary school), where from 1827 to 1870 he held the title of professor. In 1849 he was appointed technical director of the school.

Ar Berlin, he gave lectures in normal and pathological anatomy, physiology, zoology and botany. He is remembered for his investigations of animal deformities, and during his career he amassed an impressive collection of anatomical malformations. With Carl Heinrich Hertwig (1798–1881), he founded the Magazin für die gesammte Thierheilkunde (Magazine for the entirety of veterinary science).

His name is associated with Gurltia paralysans, a parasitic nematode that infects certain felines.

== Selected writings ==
- Handbuch der vergleichenden Anatomie der Haussaugetiere (1822) - Handbook of comparative anatomy for domesticated animals.
- Lehrbuch der pathologischen Anatomie der Haussaugetiere (1831) - Textbook of pathological anatomy for domesticated animals.
- "Anatomy of the Horse" (English translation by J. Willimott, 1833)
- Handbuch der vergloichenden Physiologie der Haussaugetiere (1837) - Textbook of comparative physiology for domesticated animals.
- Chirurgische Anatomie und Operationslehre für Thierärzte (1847), with Carl Heinrich Hertwig. - Surgical anatomy and operation lessons for veterinarians.
