= Helvetia Berlin =

German football club

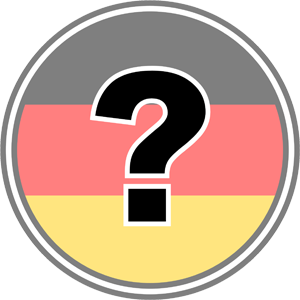
- Full name: Berliner Thor- und Fußballclub Helvetia 1898
- Founded: 5 June 1898
- Ground: Templehofer Feld
- League: defunct
Home colours	Away colours

Helvetia Berlin was a German association football club from the city of Berlin.

The short-lived club was established 5 June 1898 and disappeared sometime in 1906. Helvetia took part in the top-flight Oberliga Berlin in the 1901–02 season where they finished 5th in the six team Staffel B.

BTuFC also fielded a cricket team. Thorball or torball was a German word in use in the 1890s and early 1900s for the sport of cricket. Several early clubs playing the new "English" games of football, rugby, and cricket incorporated it into their name. The term never caught on and did not enter into common usage, soon being abandoned by sports clubs.
