= Balda (name) =

Balda is both a given name and a surname of Italian and also Basque origins. Notable people with the name include:

== Given name ==
- Balda of Jouarre, the third abbess at Jouarre Abbey in north-central France
- Baldina Di Vittorio born Balda Di Vittorio, Italian politician

== Surname ==
- Antonín Balda, Czech weightlifter
- Estefania Balda Álvarez, Ecuadorian professional tennis player
- Kyle Balda (born 1971), American animator and film director
- Fernando Balda, Ecuadorian politician
- Manu Balda, Ecuadorian footballer
- Russell Balda, American ornithologist
- Lucio Ángel Vallejo Balda, Vatican monsignor associated with the Vatileaks scandal
- Mikel Loinaz Balda, Spanish professional footballer
