= Ernst Philipp Karl Lange =

German novelist and physician

Ernst Philipp Karl Lange (21 December 1813 – 20 February 1899) was a German novelist who wrote under the pseudonym Philipp Galen.

== Biography ==
He was born at Potsdam, studied medicine at Berlin (1835–1840), and on taking his degree, in 1840, entered the Prussian army as a surgeon. In this capacity, he saw service in the Schleswig-Holstein campaign of 1849, where he was in charge of a field hospital. He settled at Bielefeld as medical practitioner and here issued his first novel, Der Inselkonig ("King of the ISland", 1852, 3rd ed., 1858), which enjoyed considerable popularity. In Bielefeld he continued to work at his profession and to write, until his retirement, with the rank of Oberstabsarzt (surgeon-general), to Potsdam in 1878, where he died.

== Literary production ==
During his lifetime, Lange was described as "a pleasing realist with no special tendency." His novels are distinguished by local colouring and pretty, though not powerful, descriptions of manners and customs. He particularly favored scenes of English life, though he had never been in that country, and on the whole he succeeded well in his descriptions.

Chief among his novels are:

- Der Irre von St James, rated by some the best of his novels (written in 1844, published in 1853; 7th ed., 1883)
- Walther Lund, a semi-biographical romance (1855)
- Emery Glandon (3rd ed., Leipzig, 1865)
- Andreas Burns, a sketch of life in Holstein; it commanded considerable attention (1856)
- Die Tochter des Diplomaten, dealing with the Schleswig-Holstein campaign; it commanded considerable attention (1865)
- Der Alte vom Berg (1873)
- Die Moselnixe (1877)
- Die Fürstendiener (1880)
- Der Meier von Monjardin (1891)

His Gesammelte Schriften appeared in 36 vols, 1857–1866. Der Irre von St James was reprinted as late as 2001.
