= Eugen Fischer (historian) =

German geologist and historian

Dr. Eugen Fischer (3 March 1899, Berchtesgaden – 19 March 1973, Berchtesgaden), also known by his pseudonym A. Helm, was a German geologist and historian. His pseudonym was created from the name of his wife Helma.

== Literary works ==
- Das Berchtesgadener Land im Wandel der Zeit 1929
- Die Literatur über das Berchtesgadener Land und seine Alpen 1930
- Moritz Mayer – ein Lebensbild der Heldin Judith Platter des Romans 'Zwei Menschen' von Richard Voss 1930, (with Magdalene Ziemke, second edition 1959)
- Hallthurm 1959
