= Olymp Berlin =

German football club

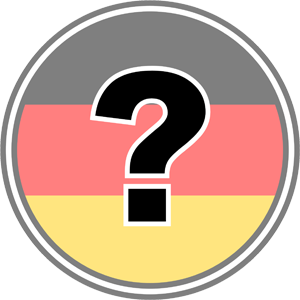
- Full name: Sportclub Olymp 1900 Berlin
- Founded: 1900
- League: defunct
Home colours	Away colours

Olymp Berlin was a short-lived German association football club from the city of Berlin. Established 9 June 1900 and playing in the club colours of red and white, the team was part of the Märkischer Fussball Bund, one of several early top flight circuits in the city.

Olymp played a single season of first division football in the MFB in 1906–07, followed by three seasons in second class competition. In 1918, they merged briefly with Ballspielverein Treptow-Süd to play a single season as Treptower Sportvereinigung 1900. The club played in the Kreisklasse Berlin (II) in the 1930s before disappearing at an unknown date.
