= Hans Otfried von Linstow =

German Army colonel and 20 July Plotter (1899–1944)

- Born: 16 March 1899; Wittenberg, German Empire
- Died: 30 August 1944 (aged 45); Plötzensee Prison, Berlin, Nazi Germany
- Cause of death: Execution by hanging
- Military career
- Allegiance: Weimar Republic (to 1933); Nazi Germany
- Branch: Army
- Rank: Colonel, Chief of Staff
- Conflicts: World War II

Hans Otfried von Linstow (16 March 1899 – 30 August 1944) was a German Army colonel. He took part in the 20 July Plot to assassinate Adolf Hitler.

== Early life ==
Born in Berlin, von Linstow joined the German military, Reichswehr, after the First World War.

== World War II ==
He served in several units, in 1939 with 15th infantry division and 1940 with the 10th army corps, in 1941 with the 9th army corps in Russia. In April 1944, he was dispatched to Paris, France, as Chief of Staff under the authority of Carl-Heinrich von Stülpnagel.

== Participation in the plot to kill Hitler and his execution ==
It was not until the actual day of the 20 July Plot in 1944, that Stülpnagel included von Linstow in his plans. Von Linstow promptly rounded up most SS, SD and Gestapo officers in Paris and imprisoned them. Claus Schenk Graf von Stauffenberg called him later to inform him that Berlin was lost. Von Linstow was arrested three days later on 23 July in Paris. Sentenced to death in Berlin by Roland Freisler, president of the People's Court on 30 August, he was executed that same day in Berlin-Plötzensee.
