= 1957 in German television =

This is a list of German television related events from 1957.

== Events ==
- 17 February - Margot Hielscher is selected to represent Germany at the 1957 Eurovision Song Contest with her song "Telefon, Telefon". She is selected to be the second German Eurovision entry during Zwei auf einem Pferd held at the Großer Sendesaal des HR in Frankfurt.
- 3 March - The 2nd Eurovision Song Contest is held at the Großer Sendesaal des hessischen Rundfunks in Frankfurt am Main. The Netherlands wins the contest with the song "Net als toen" performed by Corry Brokken.

== Debuts ==
=== ARD ===
- 3 August – Zum blauen Bock (1957–1987)
- 10 September – Bon soir, Kathrin! (1957–1964)
- 30 September – Er und Sie - Fernsehkurs für das Leben zu zweit (1957)

=== DFF ===
- 25 November – Fernsehpitaval (1957–1978)
- 25 December – Zwischen Frühstück und Gänsebraten (1957–1991)

== Television shows ==
=== 1950s ===
- Tagesschau (1952–present)

== Births ==
- 17 April - Christoph Deumling, TV & radio host & journalist
