= Stuttgart Congress =

The Stuttgart Congress of the Social Democratic Party of Germany (SPD) was held between October 3–October 8, 1898, in Stuttgart, Kingdom of Württemberg (now Germany).

The Stuttgart Congress was the first congress to discuss the question of revisionism in the SPD. A statement sent by Eduard Bernstein, who was exiled, was read to the Congress. In it, he exposed and defended his revisionist views, previously exhibited in the series of articles Problems of Socialism published in the magazine Die Neue Zeit ("The New Times").

In the Congress, Karl Kautsky and August Bebel made an initial critique of Bernsteinism. Rosa Luxemburg maintained a more uncompromising position against Bernstein's revisionism. The Congress did not adopt a resolution on this matter, but, despite the division in how to treat the question of Bernsteinism, the majority of the party showed its opposition to it.

In the Hanover Congress of 1899, the party approved a resolution that formally condemned Bernsteinist attacks on the party's policy and tactics.

Vladimir Lenin also attended in 1907.
