= Balda Baldessa =

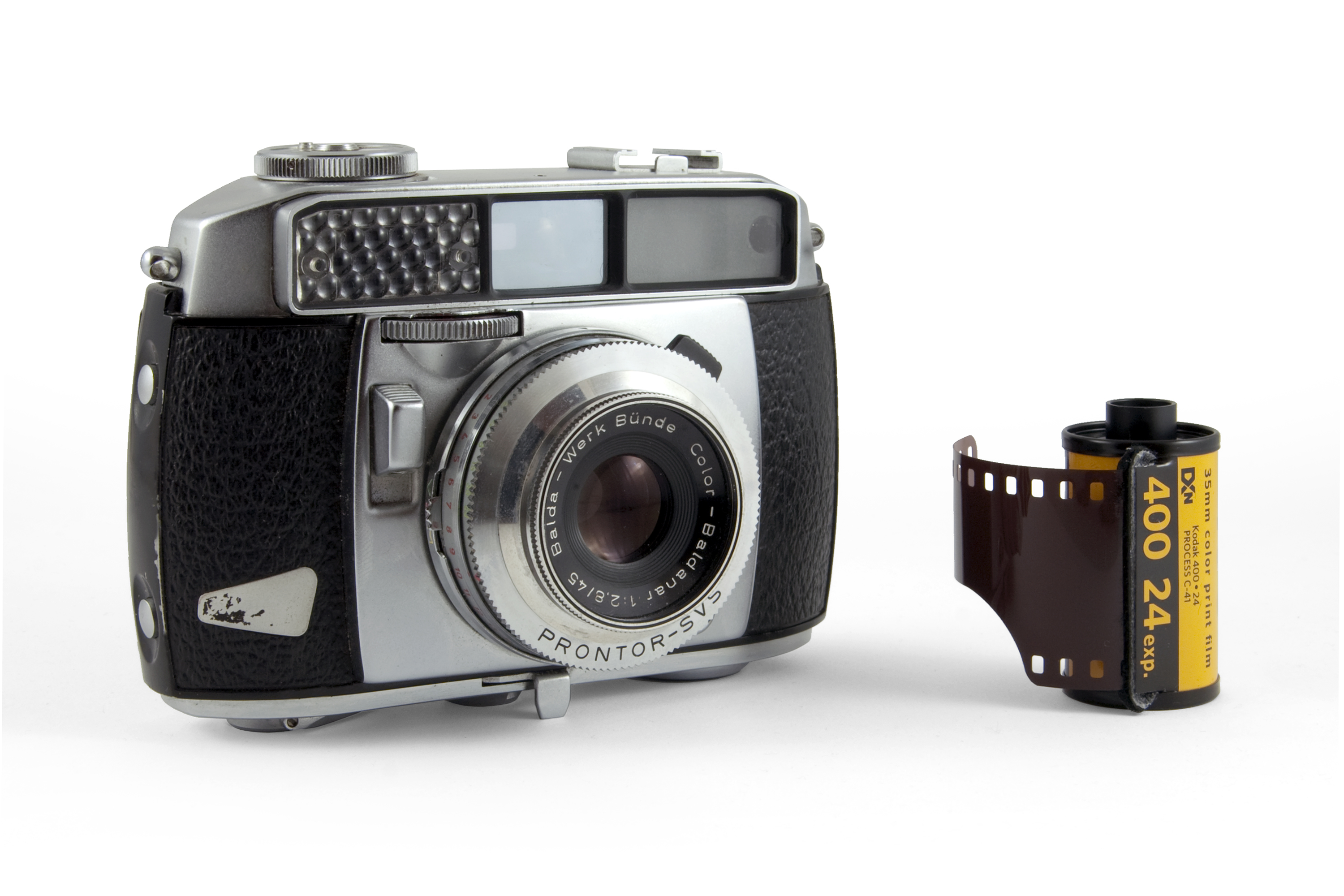
Balda Baldessa 1b. Introduced in 1958, the 1b model had a coupled rangefinder and introduced an uncoupled light meter to the series.

The Baldessa was a series of 35 mm film cameras produced in West Germany by Balda in the 1950s and 1960s. The first model (the Baldessa or Baldessa 1) debuted in 1957 with a fixed lens, although there was a choice between a four element and three element variety. The Baldessas had an unusual control layout: the film wind-on was located under the camera, so that the only control on the top with the first model was the shutter release (although this was changed with later models, where the shutter release was moved to be alongside the lens, making way for other changes).

Later models, such as the Baldessa 1b, introduced a coupled rangefinder and inbuilt selenium light meter.
