= Ernst Julius Gurlt =

German surgeon (1825–1899)

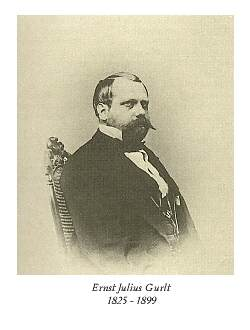
Ernst Julius Gurlt

Ernst Julius Gurlt (13 September 1825 - 9 January 1899) was a German surgeon born in Berlin. He was the son of veterinarian Ernst Friedrich Gurlt (1794–1882).

He studied medicine in Berlin, where he later became an assistant to Bernhard von Langenbeck. In 1853 he received his habilitation for surgery, becoming an associate professor in 1862 at the University of Berlin. He gained battle-related surgical experience during the First Schleswig War (1848), Second Schleswig War (1864), Austro-Prussian War (1866) and the Franco-Prussian War (1870/71).

Gurlt specialized in the treatment and research of bone and joint injuries. He is remembered for studies conducted in the field of medical statistics.

== Written works ==
He was the author of an excellent three-volume work on the history of surgery, (Geschichte der Chirurgie und ihre Ausübung, 1898), that was acclaimed for its thoroughness.

- Preussische Pharmakopöe, Berlin: Decker, 1847
- Beiträge zur vergleichenden pathologischen Anatomie der Gelenkkrankheiten. Berlin 1853
- Handbuch der Lehre von den Knochenbrüchen (two volumes), (1862–64) Online: vol. 1
- Leitfaden für Operationsübungen am Kadaver und deren Verwerthung beim lebenden Menschen, (1862).
- Zur Geschichte der internationalen und freiwilligen Krankenpflege im Krieg (1873).
- Die Gelenk-Resectionen nach Schussverletzungen, (1879).
- Biographisches Lexicon der hervorragenden Ärtze aller Zeiten und Völker Online: volume 2 (1884)
- Geschichte der Chirurgie und ihrer Ausübung (1898) Online: vol. 1; vol. 2; vol. 3
