= List of German films of the 2000s =

This is a list of some of the most notable films produced in Cinema of Germany in the 2000s.

For an alphabetical list of articles on German films see Category:2000s German films.

== 2000 ==
Title	Director	Cast	Genre	Notes
20:13 – Thou Shalt Not Kill	John Bradshaw	Thomas Heinze, Natacha Lindinger, Leah Pinsent	Thriller	a.k.a. 20.13 – Mord im Blitzlicht. German-Canadian-French co-production
Access Denied	Dirk van den Berg	Jasmin Gerat, Johannes Brandrup, Hannelore Hoger, Bastian Trost, Hanns Zischler	Thriller	a.k.a. Falsche Liebe – Die Internetfalle
Alaska.de	Esther Gronenborn	Jana Pallaske	Drama	
Altweibersommer	Martina Elbert	Anaid Iplicjian, Doris Schade, Christa Berndl, Paul Kuhn	Crime comedy	
Am Ende siegt die Liebe	Peter Weck	Denise Zich, Marianne Sägebrecht, Rolf Hoppe, Ralf Bauer	Drama	
Anatomy	Stefan Ruzowitzky	Franka Potente, Benno Fürmann, Anna Loos	Horror	
Angry Kisses	Judith Kennel	Maria Simon, Jürgen Vogel, Julia Jentsch	Drama	a.k.a. Zornige Küsse. Swiss-German co-production
Anna H. – Geliebte, Ehefrau und Hure	Michael Keusch	Doreen Jacobi, Thure Riefenstein, Simone Thomalla	Drama	a.k.a. Verbotene Leidenschaft – Die geheimen Träume einer Ehefrau
Anna Wunder	Ulla Wagner	Alice Dwyer, Renée Soutendijk	Drama	
Ants in the Pants	Marc Rothemund	Tobias Schenke, Axel Stein, Mina Tander, Andrea Sawatzki, Tina Ruland	Comedy	a.k.a. Harte Jungs
Anyone but You	Kaspar Heidelbach	Mariele Millowitsch, Friederike Kempter, Manuel Cortez, Doris Kunstmann, Axel Milberg, Guntbert Warns	Comedy, Fantasy	a.k.a. Struck by Lightning a.k.a. Zwei vom Blitz getroffen
Der arabische Prinz	Peter Deutsch, Karola Meeder	Anthony Delon, Anja Kling, Yorgo Voyagis, Dieter Kirchlechner, Helmut Zierl, Siemen Rühaak	Adventure	
Auf schmalem Grat	Erwin Keusch	Ann-Kathrin Kramer, Helmut Zierl, Huub Stapel	Crime	
Bear on the Run	Dana Vávrová	Janina Vilsmaier, Max Riemelt, Ivana Chýlková, Götz Otto, Armin Rohde, Heinrich Schafmeister, Michael Roll	Family	a.k.a. Der Bär ist los! German-Czech co-production
The Beast	Carl-Friedrich Koschnick, Gerd Roman Frosch, Oliver Berben	Iris Berben, Thure Riefenstein, Michael Mendl, Christoph Waltz	Thriller	a.k.a. Das Teufelsweib
Before Sunset	Dagmar Damek	Harald Juhnke, Julia Stemberger, Jörg Schüttauf, Claudine Wilde, Susanna Simon	Drama	a.k.a. Before Sundown
Die blauen und die grauen Tage	Dagmar Damek	Inge Meysel, Susanne Lothar, Peter Sattmann	Drama	
Blondine sucht Millionär fürs Leben	Markus Imboden	Eva Hassmann, Armin Rohde, Walter Kreye	Comedy	
Bloody Weekend	Thomas Roth	Marek Harloff, Annelise Hesme, Jürgen Hentsch, Dieter Pfaff, Jürgen Tarrach, Frank Giering, Bela B	Crime	a.k.a. Caliber De Luxe. German-Austrian co-production
Bonhoeffer: Agent of Grace	Eric Till	Ulrich Tukur, Robert Joy, Ulrich Noethen, Johanna Klante, R. H. Thomson, Tatjana Blacher, John Neville	Biography, War	German-American-Canadian co-production
The Bookfair Murders	Wolfgang Panzer	Samantha Bond, Linda Kash, Saul Rubinek, Geneviève Bujold, Eli Wallach, Robert Joy, Bernd Michael Lade, Walter Kreye	Crime	Canadian-German co-production
Brennendes Schweigen	Friedemann Fromm	Uwe Bohm, Hans Korte, Lena Stolze, Isabell Gerschke	Crime	a.k.a. Eifel-Schnee
Der Briefbomber	Torsten C. Fischer	Sylvester Groth, Bibiana Beglau, Harald Krassnitzer	Thriller	Austrian-German co-production
Bundle of Joy	Detlev Buck	Mavie Hörbiger, Anke Engelke, Pierre Besson, Detlev Buck, Simon Schwarz	Drama	a.k.a. LiebesLuder
The Calling	Richard Caesar	Laura Harris, Richard Lintern, Francis Magee, Alex Roe, Alice Krige	Horror	American-German co-production
Chill Out	Andreas Struck	Tatjana Blacher, Sebastian Blomberg, Barnaby Metschurat	Drama	
Circling	Jakob Hilpert	Cornelius Schwalm, Jacob Matschenz	Drama	a.k.a. Kleine Kreise
Cloned to Kill	Jörg Grünler	Uwe Bohm, Stefan Kurt, Marie-Lou Sellem	Science fiction	a.k.a. Mörderischer Doppelgänger
Cold Is the Evening Breeze	Rainer Kaufmann	August Diehl, Heinz Bennent, Fritzi Haberlandt, Gisela Trowe	Drama	a.k.a. Cold Is the Breath of Evening
Conamara	Eoin Moore	Ellen ten Damme, Andreas Schmidt, Darragh Kelly	Drama	
Contaminated Man	Anthony Hickox	William Hurt, Peter Weller, Natascha McElhone	Thriller	American-British-German-Hungarian co-production
The Contender	Rod Lurie	Gary Oldman, Joan Allen, Jeff Bridges, Christian Slater, William Petersen, Philip Baker Hall, Saul Rubinek, Sam Elliott	Political drama	American-German-British co-production
The Coq Is Dead	Hermine Huntgeburth	Gisela Schneeberger, August Zirner	Black comedy	
Crazy	Hans-Christian Schmid	Robert Stadlober, Tom Schilling, Oona Devi Liebich, Julia Hummer	Drama	
Dam of Fear	Frederik Steiner	Jochen Horst	Disaster	a.k.a. Die Todeswelle – Eine Stadt in Angst
Death and Judgment	Christian von Castelberg	Joachim Król, Barbara Auer, Gudrun Landgrebe, Michael Degen, Heinz Hoenig, Maja Maranow	Crime	a.k.a. A Venetian Reckoning
Despair	Marcus Lauterbach	Nina Petri, Sylvester Groth	Drama	
Deutschlandspiel	Hans-Christoph Blumenberg	Peter Ustinov, Udo Samel, Lambert Hamel, Nicole Heesters, Jean-François Balmer	Docudrama	
Double Pack	Matthias Lehmann	Markus Knüfken, Eckhard Preuß	Comedy	
Einer geht noch	Vivian Naefe	Stephanie Gossger, Ulrike Kriener, Anna Brüggemann, Christian Redl, Leonard Lansink, Dieter Pfaff	Sport	
Einmal Himmel und retour	Thomas Jacob	Christine Neubauer, August Zirner, Catherine Flemming, Ruth Maria Kubitschek	Drama	
Einmal leben	Franz Xaver Bogner	Kathi Leitner, Elmar Wepper	Drama	
England!	Achim von Borries	Ivan Shvedoff, Merab Ninidze, Anna Geislerová, Chulpan Khamatova	Drama	
Erkan & Stefan	Michael Herbig	John Friedmann, Florian Simbeck, Alexandra Neldel	Crime comedy	a.k.a. The Bunnyguards a.k.a. Erkan und Stefan
Escape to Life: The Erika and Klaus Mann Story	Andrea Weiss, Wieland Speck	Cora Frost, Christoph Eichhorn	Biography	German-British co-production
Exit to Heaven	Brigitte Müller	Frank Giering, Steffen Wink, Regula Grauwiller, Tom Schilling, Catherine Flemming, Ellen ten Damme, Simon Prescott	Drama	a.k.a. Der Himmel kann warten
Falling Rocks	Peter Keglevic	Christoph Waltz, Claudia Michelsen, Koen De Bouw, Anica Dobra, Chiara Schoras	Thriller	German-South African co-production
Fandango	Matthias Glasner	Nicolette Krebitz, Moritz Bleibtreu, Richy Müller, Corinna Harfouch, Bernd Begemann	Crime	
The Farewell	Jan Schütte	Josef Bierbichler, Monica Bleibtreu	Biography	a.k.a. Brecht's Last Summer. Screened at the 2000 Cannes Film Festival
Fassbinder's Women	Rosa von Praunheim		Documentary	
Flashback	Michael Karen	Valerie Niehaus, Alexandra Neldel, Simone Hanselmann, Xaver Hutter, Detlev Buck, Elke Sommer	Thriller	a.k.a. Murderous Vacation
Force Majeure	Joe Coppoletta	Alexandra Maria Lara, Frank Stieren	Action	a.k.a. Luftpiraten – 113 Passagiere in Todesangst
Forget America	Vanessa Jopp	Marek Harloff, Roman Knižka, Franziska Petri	Drama	
Forklift Driver Klaus – The First Day on the Job	Stefan Prehn, Jörg Wagner	Konstantin Graudus	Short	
Frauen lügen besser	Vivian Naefe	Natalia Wörner, Rebecca Immanuel, Nicole Heesters, Richy Müller	Comedy	
Fußball ist unser Leben	Tomy Wigand	Uwe Ochsenknecht, Ralf Richter	Comedy, Sport	a.k.a. Soccer Rules! a.k.a. Football Rules OK
Gefährliche Träume – Das Geheimnis einer Frau	Carlo Rola	Iris Berben, Herbert Knaup, Armin Rohde	Thriller	
Das Geheimnis des Rosengartens	Gabi Kubach	Barbara Wussow, Lara Joy Körner, Christian Kohlund, Albert Fortell, Jacques Breuer	Drama	
Die Geiseln von Costa Rica	Uwe Janson	Nina Hoss, Suzanne von Borsody, Raúl Méndez, Arturo Ríos	Thriller	
Das gestohlene Leben	Christian Görlitz	Christian Redl, Nina Petri, Rolf Illig, Hermann Lause, Monica Bleibtreu, Karl Michael Vogler	Crime	
Girl Friday	Ute Wieland	Sophie Schütt, Johannes Brandrup, Oliver Petszokat, Jessica Stockmann	Comedy	a.k.a. Wie angelt man sich seinen Chef?
Golden Boy	Uwe Janson	Matthias Koeberlin, Stefanie Stappenbeck, Hanns Zischler, Feo Aladag	Comedy	a.k.a. Ben & Maria – Liebe auf den zweiten Blick a.k.a. Ben und Maria
Gran Paradiso	Miguel Alexandre	Ken Duken, Regula Grauwiller	Drama	
Gripsholm	Xavier Koller	Ulrich Noethen, Heike Makatsch, Jasmin Tabatabai	Comedy	
Halt mich fest!	Horst Johann Sczerba	Jan Josef Liefers, Anna Loos, Jan-Gregor Kremp	Drama, Music	
A Handful of Grass	Roland Suso Richter	Oliver Korittke, Arman İnci, Ercan Durmaz	Drama	
Happy Hour oder Glück und Glas	Xaver Schwarzenberger	Martina Gedeck, Heio von Stetten, Monica Bleibtreu	Drama	Austrian-German co-production
Heimliche Küsse – Verliebt in ein Sex-Symbol	Wolfgang Limmer	Alexandra Neldel, Jürgen Lehmann	Drama	
Das Herz des Priesters	Marco Serafini	Anja Kling, Walter Sittler	Drama	
Highway Society	Mika Kaurismäki	Kai Wiesinger, Marie Zielcke, Jochen Nickel	Crime	a.k.a. Sehnsucht nach Jack. Finnish-German co-production
Das Himmler-Projekt	Romuald Karmakar	Manfred Zapatka	Docudrama, War	a.k.a. The Himmler Project
Honolulu	Vanessa Jopp, Florian Gallenberger, Uschi Ferstl, Saskia Jell, Matthias Lehmann, Beryl Schennen, Sandra Schmidt	Alexandra Maria Lara, Daniel Brühl, Julia Hummer, Eva Hassmann, Isabella Parkinson, Chiara Schoras, Mina Tander	Anthology	
Husky, Don't Cry	Tomy Wigand	Heiner Lauterbach, Barbara Rudnik, Mizuo Peck, Tobias Schenke	Drama	a.k.a. Nicht heulen, Husky
The Hustle	Stuart Cooper	Bobbie Phillips, Thomas Heinze, Robert Wagner, Stephen McHattie	Thriller	a.k.a. A Sordid Affair. Canadian-German co-production
I Love You, Baby	Nick Lyon	Jasmin Gerat, Mark Keller, Maximilian Schell, Burkhard Driest	Thriller	
Ich beiß zurück	Claudia Garde	Saskia Vester, Pasquale Aleardi, Michael Brandner, Anna Thalbach, Ulrich Matschoss	Comedy	
Im Club der Millionäre	Thorsten Näter	Heio von Stetten, Gregor Törzs, Lea Mornar, Peter Sattmann	Drama	
In July	Fatih Akin	Moritz Bleibtreu, Christiane Paul	Road movie	
Just Messing About	Jochen Kuhn	Tonio Arango, Maximilian Schell, Alexandra Maria Lara, Edgar Selge, Horst Krause, Désirée Nick	Drama	a.k.a. Fisimatenten
Just the Beginning	Pierre Franckh	Julia Richter, René Hofschneider	Comedy	a.k.a. Und das ist erst der Anfang
Kanak Attack	Lars Becker	Haluk Piyes, David Scheller, Ercan Durmaz, Tyron Ricketts	Crime	
Kein Weg zurück	Volker Vogeler	Barbara Auer, Miroslav Nemec, Karoline Eichhorn, Thure Riefenstein, Armin Rohde	Thriller	
Kidnapped in Rio	Jörg Grünler	Esther Schweins, Horst Buchholz, Paolo Seganti, Bruno Eyron, Nicola Farron	Thriller	a.k.a. Kinderraub in Rio – Eine Mutter schlägt zurück
Kissing My Sister	Dror Zahavi	Alexandra Schalaudek, Florian Heiden, August Zirner, Christian Wunderlich	Drama	a.k.a. Der Kuss meiner Schwester
Krieger und Liebhaber	Udo Wachtveitl	Marie Bäumer, Dieter Pfaff, Hilmar Thate, Rosemarie Fendel	Comedy	
Laila	Peter Ily Huemer	Stefanie Schmid, Thomas Heinze, Bela B	Horror comedy	
Lebenslügen	Dietrich Haugk	Julia Palmer-Stoll, Gaby Dohm, Ulrich Pleitgen, Timothy Peach	Drama	
The Legend of Rita	Volker Schlöndorff	Bibiana Beglau, Nadja Uhl, Martin Wuttke, Alexander Beyer, Harald Schrott, Jenny Schily	Drama	a.k.a. Die Stille nach dem Schuss
Lieb mich!	Maris Pfeiffer	Julia Richter, Naomi Krauss	Drama	a.k.a. Love Me!
Liebe pur	Florian Richter	Mark Keller, Mandala Tayde, Ezard Haußmann	Drama	
Die Liebende	Matthias Tiefenbacher	Sonja Kirchberger	Drama	a.k.a. Blutsbande
Liebestod	Stephan Wagner	Henry Hübchen, Ina Weisse, Leonard Lansink, Gregor Bloéb	Thriller	
Liebst du mich	Gabriela Zerhau	Juliane Köhler, Robert Stadlober, Peter Simonischek	Drama	
The Little Vampire	Uli Edel	Jonathan Lipnicki, Rollo Weeks, Jim Carter, Richard E. Grant, Alice Krige	Family	American-British-German co-production
The Loneliness of the Crocodile	Jobst Oetzmann	Janek Rieke, Thomas Schmauser, Julia Jäger	Drama	
Lost Killers	Dito Tsintsadze	Lasha Bakradze, Mišel Matičević, Franca Kastein	Crime comedy	Screened at the 2000 Cannes Film Festival
Love, Money, Love	Philip Gröning	Sabine Timoteo, Florian Stetter	Drama	German-Swiss-French co-production
Manila	Romuald Karmakar	Elizabeth McGovern, Jürgen Vogel, Martin Semmelrogge, Sky du Mont	Drama	
Ein Mann gibt nicht auf	Gero Erhardt	Robert Atzorn, Eliana Miglio, Ernst Jacobi, Giovanni Vettorazzo	Thriller	German-Italian co-production
Marlene	Joseph Vilsmaier	Katja Flint, Herbert Knaup, Heino Ferch, Hans Werner Meyer, Götz Otto, Armin Rohde, Heiner Lauterbach	Biography	
Mask of Death	Hans Werner	Susanna Simon, Christoph M. Ohrt, Marco Hofschneider, Maria Simon	Thriller	a.k.a. Der Feind an meiner Seite a.k.a. Mord im Swingerclub
Mein Leben gehört mir	Christiane Balthasar	Ute Willing, Klaus J. Behrendt, Barbara Rudnik	Drama	
Meine Tochter darf es nie erfahren	Lutz Konermann	Muriel Baumeister, Kai Scheve, Walter Kreye	Drama	a.k.a. Father's Daughter
Mind Hunter	Jakob Schäuffelen	Wotan Wilke Möhring, Karina Krawczyk, Sylvia Kristel	Thriller	a.k.a. Die Unbesiegbaren
Models	Mark von Seydlitz	Annett Renneberg, Marie Zielcke, Markus Knüfken, Rolf Hoppe, Ralf Bauer	Drama	
Der Mörder in dir	Peter Patzak	Andreas Patton, Katja Weitzenböck, Helmut Griem	Thriller	
Der Mörder in meiner Nähe	Bernd Böhlich	Désirée Nosbusch, Catherine Flemming, Dominique Horwitz, Henry Hübchen	Thriller	a.k.a. Death Angel
Ein mörderischer Plan	Matti Geschonneck	Iris Berben, Christian Redl, Frank Giering, Daniel Brühl	Thriller	
Die Nacht der Engel	Michael Rowitz	Ken Duken, Bernadette Heerwagen, Katharina Böhm, Oliver Korittke, Sebastian Ströbel, Herbert Knaup	Crime	
Natascha	Susanne Zanke	Martin Benrath	Crime comedy	
Der Nebelmörder – Schatten über der Stadt	Jörg Grünler	Claudia Messner, Philipp Moog, August Schmölzer, Monica Bleibtreu	Crime	
Nicht mit uns	Bernd Fischerauer	Gila von Weitershausen, Elke Sommer, Heidelinde Weis	Comedy	
Nie mehr zweite Liga	Kaspar Heidelbach	Peter Lohmeyer, Jochen Nickel, Dietmar Bär, Dieter Pfaff, Nina Petri	Crime comedy	
No More Men	Christine Hartmann	Sophie Schütt, Markus Knüfken, Boris Aljinovic, Rita Lengyel	Comedy	a.k.a. Es geht nicht immer nur um Sex
No More School	Marco Petry	Daniel Brühl, Axel Stein, Jasmin Schwiers	Comedy	a.k.a. Schule
No One Sleeps	Jochen Hick	Tom Wlaschiha	Drama	
No Place to Go	Oskar Roehler	Hannelore Elsner	Drama	a.k.a. Die Unberührbare
Now or Never: Time Is Money	Lars Büchel	Christel Peters, Elisabeth Scherer, Gudrun Okras	Crime comedy	
Oi! Warning	Benjamin Reding, Dominik Reding	Sascha Backhaus	Drama	
Der Paradiesvogel	Peter Deutsch	Katja Weitzenböck, Michael Mendl, Bernhard Schir, Gaby Dohm, David Gulpilil, David Ngoombujarra	Drama	a.k.a. The Bird of Paradise
Paradiso: Seven Days with Seven Women	Rudolf Thome	Hanns Zischler, Cora Frost, Adriana Altaras, Irm Hermann, Sabine Bach	Comedy	
A Passing Angel	Peter Reichenbach	Mareike Carrière, Christian Kohlund, Miriam Stein	Drama	a.k.a. Das Mädchen aus der Fremde. Swiss-German co-production
Paul Is Dead	Hendrik Handloegten	Sebastian Urzendowsky	Comedy	
Perfect Sight	Sören Voigt	Henriette Heinze, Ill-Young Kim	Comedy	a.k.a. The Perfect Site a.k.a. Tolle Lage
Das Phantom	Dennis Gansel	Jürgen Vogel	Thriller	a.k.a. The Phantom
Policewoman	Andreas Dresen	Gabriela Maria Schmeide, Axel Prahl, Yevgeni Sitokhin	Drama	
The Princess and the Warrior	Tom Tykwer	Franka Potente, Benno Fürmann	Drama	a.k.a. Der Krieger und die Kaiserin
Probieren Sie's mit einem Jüngeren	Michael Kreihsl	Senta Berger, Ulrich Reinthaller, Karlheinz Hackl	Comedy	Austrian-German co-production
The Psycho Girl	Martin Weinhart	Florian David Fitz, Sanne Schnapp, Jana Petersen	Thriller	
Recycled	Maria von Heland	Peter Lohmeyer, Amanda Ooms, Dieter Laser, Blixa Bargeld	Thriller	
Return to Go!	Pierre Sanoussi-Bliss	Pierre Sanoussi-Bliss, Matthias Freihof, Dieter Bach	Drama	a.k.a. Zurück auf Los
The Righteous Judge	Torsten C. Fischer	Frank Giering, Julia Jäger, André Hennicke, Jürgen Hentsch	Drama	
Rote Glut	Mark Schlichter	Meret Becker, Richy Müller, Roman Knižka, Michael Degen, Hermann Lause	Drama	
Rugrats in Paris: The Movie	Paul Demeyer, Stig Bergqvist	—N/a	Animated comedy	American-German co-production
Der Runner	Michael Rowitz	Tim Bergmann, Doreen Jacobi, Sonja Kirchberger, Ingo Naujoks, Marie Zielcke	Science fiction	
Salamander	Barbara Gebler	Henriette Heinze, Bela B, Mario Mentrup	Crime	
Sanctimony	Uwe Boll	Casper Van Dien, Michael Paré, Eric Roberts, Jennifer Rubin, Catherine Oxenberg	Horror	American-German co-production
Scardanelli	Harald Bergmann	André Wilms	Biography	
Scharf aufs Leben	Christine Kabisch	Senta Berger, Ralph Herforth, Ulrich Pleitgen	Comedy	
Ein Scheusal zum Verlieben	Sharon von Wietersheim	Jasmin Gerat, Max Tidof, Karl Michael Vogler	Comedy	
Schrott – Die Atzenposse	Axel Hildebrand	Uwe Ochsenknecht, Boris Aljinovic, Luci van Org, Inga Busch, Hans Werner Olm	Comedy	
Der schwarze Spiegel	Rainer Boldt	Sonja Kirchberger, Peter Bongartz, Ingrid van Bergen	Drama	
Schweigen ist Gold	Sabine Landgraeber	Mavie Hörbiger, Roman Knižka, Horst Krause	Crime comedy	
Schwiegermutter	Dagmar Hirtz	Christiane Hörbiger, Martin Glade	Drama	
Secret of Tattooed Mummy	Curt Faudon	Tobias Moretti, Katja Weitzenböck, Benjamin Sadler, Gudrun Landgrebe, Erwin Steinhauer	Thriller	a.k.a. Das Tattoo – Tödliche Zeichen
Seitensprung ins Glück	Stefan Lukschy	Claudine Wilde, Michael Roll	Comedy	German-Austrian co-production
Seven Days to Live	Sebastian Niemann	Amanda Plummer, Sean Pertwee, Nick Brimble	Horror	a.k.a. 7 Days to Live. German-American-Czech co-production
Sex oder Liebe?	Christoph Schrewe	Jennifer Nitsch, Hannes Jaenicke, Arnd Klawitter, Katharina Müller-Elmau	Comedy	
Shadows of Memory	Claudia von Alemann		Documentary	
Die Spur meiner Tochter	Hajo Gies	Götz George, Jan Josef Liefers, Karoline Eichhorn	Thriller	
Spuren im Eis – Eine Frau sucht die Wahrheit	Walter Weber	İdil Üner, Benjamin Sadler	Thriller	Swiss-German co-production
The State I Am In	Christian Petzold	Barbara Auer, Richy Müller, Julia Hummer	Drama	a.k.a. Die innere Sicherheit
Stunde des Wolfs	Hermine Huntgeburth	Richy Müller, Marek Harloff, Lea Mornar, Corinna Harfouch	Drama	
Sumo Bruno	Lenard Fritz Krawinkel	Hakan Orbeyi, Oliver Korittke, Martin Semmelrogge	Comedy	
Taboo	Zoltan Spirandelli	Matthias Schweighöfer, Marion Mitterhammer	Drama	a.k.a. Forbidden Desire: I Love My Student
Teuflischer Engel	Peter Kahane	Gottfried John, Julia Stemberger	Crime	
Thrill – Spiel um dein Leben	Peter Jürgensmeier	Stefan Jürgens, Ingolf Lück, Alexandra Kamp, Sylvia Haider, Tobias Schenke	Thriller	
Time Share	Sharon von Wietersheim	Nastassja Kinski, Timothy Dalton	Comedy	German-American co-production
Tödliche Wildnis – Sie waren jung und mussten sterben	Jorgo Papavassiliou	Chiara Schoras, Mina Tander, Mandala Tayde, Niels Bruno Schmidt, Simon Licht, Arndt Schwering-Sohnrey	Horror	
Der tote Taucher im Wald	Marcus O. Rosenmüller	Dieter Pfaff, Axel Milberg, Ingo Naujoks, Uwe Ochsenknecht, Michaela Schaffrath	Black comedy	a.k.a. The Dead Diver in the Woods
Tour Abroad	Ayşe Polat	Hilmi Sözer	Road movie	a.k.a. Auslandstournee
Trennungsfieber	Manfred Stelzer	Senta Berger, Günther Maria Halmer, Nele Mueller-Stöfen, Mimi Fiedler	Comedy	
Tricked	Rainer Matsutani	Mira Bartuschek, Miroslav Nemec, Jutta Speidel, Ken Duken, Eva Habermann	Thriller	a.k.a. Einladung zum Mord. Remake of The Last Holidays (1975)
Trivial Pursuit	Curt Faudon	Jule Ronstedt, Tobias Moretti, Thomas Heinze	Crime	a.k.a. Wenn Männer Frauen trauen
Trust Me	Martin Eigler	Benno Fürmann, Erdal Yıldız, Christiane Paul, Michael Gwisdek, Irene Kugler	Crime	a.k.a. Friends
Und morgen geht die Sonne wieder auf	Johannes Fabrick	Antje Schmidt, Hans Werner Meyer	Drama	
Undertaker's Paradise	Matthias X. Oberg	Thomas Schmauser, Ben Gazzara	Comedy	
Unknown Friend	Anne Høegh Krohn	Karoline Eichhorn, Inga Busch	Drama	a.k.a. Fremde Freundin
The Unscarred	Buddy Giovinazzo	James Russo, Ornella Muti, Heino Ferch	Thriller	a.k.a. Everybody Dies. British-German co-production
Verhängnisvolles Glück	Thorsten Näter	Nadja Uhl, Dieter Pfaff	Drama	
Verlorene Kinder	Norbert Kückelmann	Robert Giggenbach	Crime drama	
Vertrauen ist alles	Berno Kürten	Alexandra Maria Lara, Xaver Hutter, Peter Simonischek, Michou Pascale Anderson	Comedy	
Die Verwegene – Kämpfe um deinen Traum	Martin Walz	Alexandra Kalweit	Comedy	
Vom Küssen und vom Fliegen	Hartmut Schoen	Susanne Lothar, Felix Eitner, Lisa Martinek, Johann von Bülow, Anneke Kim Sarnau	Comedy	
Der Weibsteufel	Jo Baier	Fritz Karl, Julia Thurnau, Günther Maria Halmer, Friedrich von Thun	Crime drama	Austrian-German co-production
Der Weihnachtswolf	Matthias Steurer	Clemens Jakubetz, Johanna Christine Gehlen, Axel Milberg, Adam Bousdoukos, Anneke Kim Sarnau	Thriller	
Wenn man sich traut	Christoph Waltz	Felix Eitner, Julia Jäger, Hansa Czypionka, Anke Sevenich, Ulrike Kriener, Hanns Zischler, Tilo Prückner	Comedy	
Wolfsheim	Nicole Weegmann	Laura Tonke, Barnaby Metschurat, Antoine Monot Jr., Niels Bruno Schmidt	Crime	
www.maedchenkiller.de – Todesfalle Internet	Mark von Seydlitz	Jochen Horst, Gesine Cukrowski	Thriller	
Zärtliche Sterne	Julian Pölsler	Bernadette Heerwagen, Tim Bergmann	Drama	
Zehn wahnsinnige Tage	Christian Wagner	Indira Varma, Fabian Busch	Drama	a.k.a. 10 wahnsinnige Tage
Zimmer mit Frühstück	Michael Verhoeven	Senta Berger, Johannes Brandrup, Gisela Schneeberger, Muriel Baumeister, Michael Gwisdek, Lavinia Wilson	Comedy	
Zoom	Otto Alexander Jahrreiss	Oana Solomon, Florian Lukas	Thriller	
Zwei Mädels auf Mallorca – Die heißeste Nacht des Jahres	Dror Zahavi	Bojana Golenac, İdil Üner	Drama	a.k.a. 2 Mädels auf Mallorca

== 2001 ==
Title	Director	Cast	Genre	Notes
99euro-films	Miriam Dehne, Matthias Glasner, Esther Gronenborn, Nicolette Krebitz, Peter Lohmeyer, RP Kahl, Michael Klier, Frieder Schlaich, Mark Schlichter, Martin Walz	Matthias Brandt, Arno Frisch, Julia Hummer, Mavie Hörbiger, Oliver Korittke, Alexandra Maria Lara, Peter Lohmeyer, Richy Müller, Caroline Peters, Minh-Khai Phan-Thi, Axel Prahl, Andreas Schmidt, Laura Tonke	Anthology	
100 Pro	Simon Verhoeven	Ken Duken, Luca Verhoeven, Mavie Hörbiger	Comedy	
1000 Meilen für die Liebe	Peter Deutsch	Sophie Schütt, Daniel Morgenroth, Gaby Dohm, Ulrich Pleitgen, Johanna Klante, Jörg Schüttauf, Fabian Busch, Anna Lise Phillips	Adventure	a.k.a. Tausend Meilen für die Liebe
The Abrafaxe – Under the Black Flag	Gerhard Hahn	—N/a	Animated	a.k.a. The Pirates of Tortuga: Under the Black Flag
Abschied in den Tod	Martin Buchhorn	Denise Zich, Susanne Lothar, Dieter Laser, Craig McLachlan, Nicholas Bell, Sophie Heathcote, Brett Tucker, Bernard Curry, Mark Mitchell	Thriller	a.k.a. Backlands. German-Australian co-production
Albtraum einer Ehe	Johannes Fabrick	Nina Kronjäger, August Zirner	Drama	
All I Want for Christmas	Thomas Louis Pröve	Inka Friedrich, Hannes Jaenicke, Heio von Stetten, Nina Gummich	Family	a.k.a. Ein Vater zu Weihnachten
All the Queen's Men	Stefan Ruzowitzky	Matt LeBlanc, Eddie Izzard, Nicolette Krebitz, Udo Kier, Edward Fox	Comedy, War	American-Austrian-German co-production
All'Arrabbiata – Eine kochende Leidenschaft	Hannu Salonen	Stefanie Schmid, Thomas Lehmann	Comedy	
Allein unter Männern	Angeliki Antoniou	Ann-Kathrin Kramer, Harald Krassnitzer, Heio von Stetten, Dietrich Hollinderbäumer	Drama	
Anam	Buket Alakuş	Nursel Köse	Drama	a.k.a. My Mother
Antonia – Zwischen Liebe und Macht	Jörg Grünler	Alexandra Kamp, Kai Wiesinger, Benjamin Sadler, Vanni Corbellini, Naike Rivelli, Dietrich Hollinderbäumer, Rita Russek	Drama	a.k.a. Antonia – Ein Herz auf der Suche
As Far as My Feet Will Carry Me	Hardy Martins	Bernhard Bettermann, Irina Pantaeva, Michael Mendl	Drama	
Auf Herz und Nieren	Thomas Jahn	Steffen Wink, Thierry Van Werveke, Burt Reynolds, Udo Kier	Crime comedy	
Avalanche	Jörg Grünler	Claudia Michelsen, Herbert Knaup, Fritz Karl	Thriller	a.k.a. Entscheidung im Eis – Eine Frau jagt den Mörder
Das Baby-Komplott	Hans Werner	Ann-Kathrin Kramer, Friedrich von Thun	Thriller	
Babykram ist Männersache	Uwe Janson	Matthias Koeberlin, Matthias Schweighöfer, Marek Harloff	Comedy	
Bargeld lacht	Hajo Gies	Friedrich von Thun, Andrea Sawatzki, Dominique Horwitz, August Schmölzer, Götz George	Crime	
Be.Angeled	Roman Kuhn	Anatole Taubman, Sólveig Arnarsdóttir, Mark Spoon, Lexy	Drama, Music	
Berlin Babylon	Hubertus Siegert		Documentary, Music	
Berlin Is in Germany	Hannes Stöhr	Jörg Schüttauf, Julia Jäger, Madita	Drama	
Besuch aus Bangkok	Susanne Hake	Richard Barenberg, Stephan Schwartz, Leonard Lansink, Udo Schenk, Katharina Meinecke, Sabine Vitua, Alissa Jung	Comedy	
Beyond Love	Matti Geschonneck	Robert Atzorn, Martina Gedeck, Ulrich Matschoss	Thriller	a.k.a. Jenseits der Liebe
Birthday	Stefan Jäger	Bibiana Beglau, Tamara Simunovic	Drama	Swiss-German co-production
Black Box BRD	Andres Veiel		Documentary	
Black Widow	Paul Harather	Christiane Hörbiger, Udo Kier, Jan Niklas, Simon Schwarz	Black comedy	a.k.a. The Praying Mantis. Austrian-German co-production
Blackwoods	Uwe Boll	Patrick Muldoon, Michael Paré, Keegan Connor Tracy	Thriller	German-Canadian co-production
The Curse of the Jade Scorpion	Woody Allen	Woody Allen, Dan Aykroyd, Helen Hunt, Brian Markinson, Wallace Shawn, David Ogden Stiers, Charlize Theron	Crime comedy	American-German co-production
Der blaue Vogel	Dietmar Klein	Annett Renneberg, Timothy Peach, Dietmar Schönherr, Wolfgang Völz	Drama	
Die Braut meines Freundes	Gabi Kubach	Michael von Au, Katharina Böhm, Florian Fitz	Comedy	
Clowns	Tim Trageser	Frank Giering, Anna Thalbach, Jochen Nickel	Crime comedy	
Der Club der grünen Witwen	Udo Witte	Rita Russek, Christine Neubauer, Ursula Karven, Manon Straché, Horst Buchholz, Francis Fulton-Smith	Comedy	
The Crusaders	Dominique Othenin-Girard	Alessandro Gassmann, Johannes Brandrup, Thure Riefenstein, Franco Nero, Armin Mueller-Stahl, Uwe Ochsenknecht, Thomas Heinze	Historical drama	Italian-German co-production
Dance with the Devil	Peter Keglevic	Christoph Waltz, Sebastian Koch, Tobias Moretti	Thriller	a.k.a. Die Entführung des Richard Oetker
The Days Between	Maria Speth	Sabine Timoteo	Drama	a.k.a. In den Tag hinein
Dead Island: School's Out 2	Robert Sigl	Katharina Wackernagel, Barnaby Metschurat, Alexandra Finder, Friederike Kempter	Horror	a.k.a. Das Mädcheninternat – Deine Schreie wird niemand hören
Death Row	Michael Wenning	Jan Josef Liefers, Claudia Michelsen, Calvin Burke	Crime	a.k.a. Todesstrafe – Ein Deutscher hinter Gittern
Death Train to the Pacific	Hans Werner	Anja Kling, Helmut Griem, Ulrich Pleitgen	Disaster	a.k.a. Amokfahrt zum Pazifik. German-Canadian co-production
Deep Freeze	John Carl Buechler	Götz Otto, Alexandra Kamp	Horror	a.k.a. Ice Crawlers. American-German co-production
The Dreaming	Heidi Ulmke	Alexandra Kamp, Hardy Krüger Jr., Mariella Ahrens	Drama	a.k.a. Traumzeit
Du oder keine	Marco Serafini	Florian Fitz, Carol Campbell, Gerd Baltus	Comedy	
Emil and the Detectives	Franziska Buch	Tobias Retzlaff, Jürgen Vogel, Maria Schrader, Kai Wiesinger	Family	
Ende der Saison	Stefan Krohmer	Anneke Kim Sarnau, Hannelore Elsner, Christian Brückner, Devid Striesow	Drama	
Enemy at the Gates	Jean-Jacques Annaud	Jude Law, Ed Harris, Rachel Weisz, Joseph Fiennes, Bob Hoskins	War	American-British-French-German-Irish co-production
Engel & Joe	Vanessa Jopp	Robert Stadlober, Jana Pallaske, Mirko Lang, Nadja Bobyleva	Drama	a.k.a. Engel and Joe a.k.a. Engel und Joe
Engel sucht Flügel	Marek Gierszał	Annett Renneberg, Christoph Waltz, Julian Weigend	Comedy	
Die Erpressung – Ein teuflischer Pakt	Stefan Krohmer	Uschi Glas, Julia Jentsch, Walter Kreye, Dietrich Mattausch, Dieter Kirchlechner	Thriller	
Das Experiment	Oliver Hirschbiegel	Moritz Bleibtreu, Justus von Dohnányi, Andrea Sawatzki, Edgar Selge, Oliver Stokowski, Maren Eggert	Thriller	a.k.a. The Experiment
Familie und andere Glücksfälle	Dror Zahavi	Ann-Kathrin Kramer, Arndt Schwering-Sohnrey	Comedy	a.k.a. An Unexpected Gift
Female 2 Seeks Happy End	Edward Berger	Ben Becker, Isabella Parkinson, Sabrina Setlur	Comedy	German-Swiss co-production
A Fine Day	Thomas Arslan	Serpil Turhan	Drama	a.k.a. Der schöne Tag
Die Frau, die Freundin und der Vergewaltiger	Michael Keusch	Doreen Jacobi, Valerie Niehaus, Thomas Scharff	Thriller	a.k.a. Schatten über meiner Ehe
Das Geheimnis – Auf der Spur des Mörders	Jorgo Papavassiliou	Barbara Rudnik, Thomas Sarbacher	Thriller	
Gespensterjagd	Stephan Meyer	Maria Furtwängler, Alistair Appleton, Hilde van Mieghem	Crime	a.k.a. Die achte Todsünde: Gespensterjagd a.k.a. Die 8. Todsünde: Gespensterjagd
Getting My Brother Laid	Sven Taddicken	Hinnerk Schönemann, Julia Jentsch, Roman Knižka, Alexander Scheer, Marie-Luise Schramm, Marie-Lou Sellem	Comedy	a.k.a. My Brother the Vampire
Das Glück ist eine Insel	Gloria Behrens	Maria Furtwängler, Christian Kohlund, Ulrich Matschoss, Valerie Niehaus, Stefan Reck	Drama	
Gnadenlose Bräute	Manfred Stelzer	Stefanie Stappenbeck, Barbara Philipp, Ingo Naujoks, Andreas Schmidt, Stephan Kampwirth	Crime	a.k.a. Relentless Women
Goebbels und Geduldig	Kai Wessel	Ulrich Mühe, Eva Mattes, Katja Riemann, Katharina Thalbach, Götz Otto, Dieter Pfaff	War comedy	
Hat er Arbeit?	Kai Wessel	Wotan Wilke Möhring, Mina Tander	Drama	
Hawaiian Gardens	Percy Adlon	Richard Bradford, André Eisermann, Valeria Hernandez, Richard Roundtree	Drama	
Heart	Horst Johann Sczerba	Michael Roll, Uwe Bohm, Mehmet Kurtuluş, Florian Fitz, Laura Tonke, Johanna Gastdorf	Drama	
Heart Over Head	Michael Gutmann	Alicja Bachleda-Curuś, Tom Schilling, Matthias Schweighöfer	Drama	a.k.a. Herz im Kopf a.k.a. Herz über Kopf
Heidi M.	Michael Klier	Katrin Sass, Dominique Horwitz	Drama	
Die heimlichen Blicke des Mörders	Michael Keusch	Marcus Mittermeier, Doreen Jacobi, Wiebke Bachmann, Barbara Kowa	Thriller	a.k.a. Webcamgirl
Heinrich der Säger	Klaus Gietinger	Rolf Becker, Alexander Beyer, Meret Becker, Karina Krawczyk	Crime comedy	
Der Held an meiner Seite	Peter Deutsch	August Zirner, Suzanne von Borsody, Dieter Kirchlechner	Crime comedy	
Herzstolpern	Sharon von Wietersheim	Carin C. Tietze, Kai Scheve, Florian Fitz	Comedy	
High Score	Matthias Glasner	Benno Fürmann, Nele Mueller-Stöfen	Thriller	a.k.a. State Secret
Hochzeit zu viert	Heidi Kranz	Renée Soutendijk, Michaela May, Elmar Wepper, Harald Krassnitzer	Drama	
Holiday Affair	Uli Möller	Ursula Karven, Bruno Eyron, Jessica Stockmann	Drama	
The Hollywood Sign	Sönke Wortmann	Tom Berenger, Rod Steiger, Burt Reynolds	Comedy	
Hostile Takeover	Carl Schenkel	Thomas Kretschmann, Désirée Nosbusch, Klaus Löwitsch	Crime	a.k.a. althan.com
Die Hunde sind schuld	Andreas Prochaska	Tilo Prückner, Barbara Valentin, Anna Loos, Alexander Beyer, Dieter Landuris	Comedy	
The Hunted Child	Jakob Schäuffelen	Andrea Sawatzki, Ingo Naujoks, Maximilian Seidel	Thriller	a.k.a. Nur mein Sohn war Zeuge
Ice Planet	Winrich Kolbe	Sab Shimono, Wes Studi, Rae Baker, Reiner Schöne	Science fiction	Canadian-German co-production
Eine Insel zum Träumen – Koh Samui	Holm Dressler	Rainhard Fendrich, Ottfried Fischer, Barbara Wussow	Comedy	Austrian-German co-production
Invincible	Werner Herzog	Jouko Ahola, Tim Roth, Anna Gourari, Udo Kier, Max Raabe	Drama	American-British-German-Irish co-production
Jagd auf den Plastiktüten-Mörder	Markus Bräutigam	Oliver Bootz, Christoph M. Ohrt, Cecilia Kunz, Tim Fischer	Thriller	
Jeans	Nicolette Krebitz	Nicolette Krebitz, Marc Hosemann, Oskar Melzer, Jana Pallaske, Mavie Hörbiger	Drama	
Jenseits	Max Färberböck	Sylvester Groth, Katerina Medvedeva, Anja Kling	Drama	
Jetzt bin ich dran, Liebling!	Michael Steinke	Anja Kruse, Jochen Horst, Sabine Wolf	Comedy	
Jetzt bringen wir unsere Männer um	Holger C. Gotha	Eva Herzig, Julia Bremermann, Simon Licht, Gregor Bloéb, Xenia Seeberg	Crime comedy	Austrian-German co-production
Jonathans Liebe	Zoltan Spirandelli	Benjamin Sadler, Maria Simon, Thomas Scharff, Annedore Kleist	Drama	
The Journey to Kafiristan	Donatello Dubini, Fosco Dubini	Jeanette Hain, Nina Petri	Adventure	Swiss-German-Dutch co-production
Jud Süß – A Film as a Crime?	Horst Königstein	Axel Milberg	Docudrama, War	
Julietta	Christoph Stark	Lavinia Wilson, Barnaby Metschurat, Matthias Koeberlin	Drama	
Kelly Bastian – Geschichte einer Hoffnung	Andreas Kleinert	Dagmar Manzel, Michael Mendl	Biography	
Klassentreffen – Mordfall unter Freunden	Diethard Küster	Natalia Wörner, Christoph M. Ohrt, Herbert Knaup, Leslie Malton, Justus von Dohnányi, Esther Schweins	Crime	
Kleiner Mann sucht großes Herz	Heidi Kranz	Mark Keller, Bettina Zimmermann, David Kötter	Drama	
Küss mich, Tiger!	Jan Ruzicka	Uwe Ochsenknecht, Barbara Rudnik, Peter Sattmann, Dominique Horwitz, Anian Zollner	Comedy	
Lammbock	Christian Zübert	Moritz Bleibtreu, Lucas Gregorowicz, Alexandra Neldel, Marie Zielcke, Elmar Wepper	Comedy	
Lenya	Michael Rowitz	Anja Knauer, Sonja Kirchberger, Walter Kreye	Fantasy	a.k.a. Lenya – Die größte Kriegerin aller Zeiten
Leo & Claire	Joseph Vilsmaier	Michael Degen, Suzanne von Borsody, Franziska Petri, Dietmar Schönherr, Andrea Sawatzki	Drama, War	a.k.a. Leo and Claire a.k.a. Leo und Claire
Letter from an Unknown Woman	Jacques Deray	Irène Jacob, Christopher Thompson	Drama	French-German co-production
Liebe. Macht. Blind.	Thorsten Näter	Götz George, Barbara Auer, Armin Rohde, Sylvester Groth	Crime comedy	
Die Liebenden vom Alexanderplatz	Detlef Rönfeldt	Inge Meysel, Johanna Christine Gehlen, Eleonore Weisgerber, Hans Peter Hallwachs, Robert Freitag	Drama	
Liebeskrank	Olaf Kreinsen	Muriel Baumeister, Pierre Besson	Thriller	
Life Calling	Isabel Kleefeld	Martin Glade, Yangzom Brauen, Wotan Wilke Möhring	Comedy	a.k.a. Schluss mit lustig
The Little Polar Bear	Piet De Rycker, Thilo Rothkirch	—N/a	Animated	
The Living Room Fountain	Peter Timm	Götz Schubert	Comedy	a.k.a. The Indoor Fountain
Lotto-Liebe	Susanne Hake	Gruschenka Stevens, Inga Busch, Liane Forestieri, Ingo Naujoks, Ole Puppe	Comedy	
Liebe, Tod und viele Kalorien	Dietmar Klein	Thekla Carola Wied, Annett Renneberg, Horst Janson, Xenia Seeberg, Nils Nelleßen	Comedy	a.k.a. Love, Death and Many Calories
Love Letters – Liebe per Nachnahme	Thomas Louis Pröve	Annika Pages, Bernhard Schir	Comedy	
Love the Hard Way	Peter Sehr	Adrien Brody, Charlotte Ayanna, Pam Grier, August Diehl	Drama	German-American co-production
Love Trip	Richard Huber	Désirée Nosbusch, Hannes Jaenicke, Dominic Raacke	Comedy	
Mädchen, Mädchen	Dennis Gansel	Diana Amft, Karoline Herfurth, Felicitas Woll	Comedy	a.k.a. Girls on Top
The Man Next Door	Dror Zahavi	Lisa Martinek, Andrea Sawatzki, Axel Milberg, Stephan Kampwirth	Thriller	a.k.a. The Next-Door Neighbour
Der Mann, den sie nicht lieben durfte	Lars Montag	Muriel Baumeister, Christoph M. Ohrt	Drama	
Mein Vater und andere Betrüger	Christian von Castelberg	Uwe Ochsenknecht, Christine Neubauer, Mareike Lindenmeyer, Anna Bertheau, Saskia Vester, Vinzenz Kiefer	Drama	
Meine Mutter, meine Rivalin	Peter F. Bringmann	Daniela Ziegler, Sharon Brauner, Dominique Horwitz, Walter Giller, Walter Kreye	Drama, Music	
Men Are Dispensable	Christian Schumacher	Christine Neubauer, Stefan Jürgens, Doris Kunstmann	Comedy	a.k.a. Männer sind zum Abgewöhnen
Die Meute der Erben	Ulrich König	Günter Pfitzmann, Rosemarie Fendel, Catherine Flemming, Eleonore Weisgerber	Comedy	
The Middle of Nowhere	Nathalie Steinbart	Florian Panzner, Tamara Simunovic, Vadim Glowna	Crime	a.k.a. Endstation Tanke
The Mists of Avalon	Uli Edel	Anjelica Huston, Julianna Margulies, Joan Allen	Fantasy	American-German co-production
Moonlight Tariff	Ralf Huettner	Gruschenka Stevens, Tim Bergmann, Jasmin Tabatabai, Bettina Zimmermann	Comedy, Romance	a.k.a. The Waiting Game
Mörderinnen	Pepe Danquart	Katja Studt, Cornelia Schmaus	Thriller	
Mostly Martha	Sandra Nettelbeck	Martina Gedeck, Sergio Castellitto	Comedy	a.k.a. Bella Martha
My Sweet Home	Filippos Tsitos	Nadja Uhl, Harvey Friedman	Comedy	
Never Mind the Wall	Connie Walther	Anna Bertheau, Antonio Wannek, Tim Sander	Drama	a.k.a. Pissed and Proud a.k.a. Wie Feuer und Flamme
No Regrets	Benjamin Quabeck	Daniel Brühl, Jessica Schwarz, Denis Moschitto, Marie-Lou Sellem	Drama	a.k.a. Nichts bereuen
Nowhere in Africa	Caroline Link	Juliane Köhler, Merab Ninidze, Matthias Habich, Sidede Onyulo	Drama	Won Oscar
Null Uhr 12	Bernd Michael Lade	Meret Becker, Dieter Landuris, Bernd Michael Lade, Mario Irrek, Reiner Schöne, Isabella Parkinson	Crime	a.k.a. 12 Past Midnight
Eine öffentliche Affäre	Rolf Schübel	Christian Quadflieg, Ulrike Kriener, Bernadette Heerwagen	Drama	
Passing Summer	Angela Schanelec	Ursina Lardi	Drama	a.k.a. Mein langsames Leben
A Passionate Princess	Matthias Tiefenbacher	Valerie Koch, Steffen Groth, Fritz Karl, Marie-Lou Sellem	Drama	a.k.a. Sophie – Sissis kleine Schwester
Paulas Schuld	Claudia Garde	Ulrike Krumbiegel, Ute Willing	Drama	
Personal Trainer	Dietmar Klein	Michael Rast, Wolf Roth, Karin Giegerich	Thriller	a.k.a. A Time to Stay
The Piano Teacher	Michael Haneke	Isabelle Huppert, Benoît Magimel, Annie Girardot	Drama	a.k.a. Die Klavierspielerin. French-Austrian-German co-production. Won 3 awards at Cannes
Pilgrimage	Werner Herzog		Documentary	
Planet Alex	Uli M Schueppel	Marie Zielcke, Baki Davrak, Nadeshda Brennicke, Marusha, Ben Becker, Andreas Schmidt	Drama	
Planet of the Cannibals	Hans-Christoph Blumenberg	Minh-Khai Phan-Thi, Florian Lukas, Vadim Glowna, Barbara Auer	Black comedy, Science fiction	
Private Lies	Sherry Hormann	Martina Gedeck, John Corbett	Drama	a.k.a. Bye Bye America a.k.a. Scheidung auf Amerikanisch
Prosecco Drinking Women	Ulrich König	Tina Ruland, Hardy Krüger Jr., Helmut Zierl	Comedy	a.k.a. Women Who Drink Prosecco a.k.a. Power Women
Prüfstand VII	Robert Bramkamp	Inga Busch, Peter Lohmeyer	War, Docudrama, Science fiction	
The Publisher	Bernd Böhlich	Heiner Lauterbach, Susanna Simon, Anica Dobra, Lisa Martinek, Sylvester Groth, Jürgen Hentsch	Biography	a.k.a. Der Verleger a.k.a. Axel Springer
Racing Heart	Hanno Brühl	Antonio Wannek, Lena Lauzemis	Crime	a.k.a. Herzrasen
Das Rätsel des blutroten Rubins	Thomas Jauch	Floriane Daniel, Tatjana Blacher, Rolf Hoppe, Ulrich Noethen, Dirk Bach	Adventure	
Rave Macbeth	Klaus Knoesel	Michael Rosenbaum, Nicki Aycox, Kirk Baltz, Jamie Elman, Marguerite Moreau	Music, Crime	
Rent a Baby	Christoph Schrewe	Tom Wlaschiha, Christian Näthe, Alexandra Neldel, İdil Üner, Axel Stein	Comedy	a.k.a. Verliebte Jungs
Revenge of the Rats	Jörg Lühdorff	Ralph Herforth, Anne Cathrin Buhtz	Horror, Disaster	a.k.a. Rats
Rieke's Love	Kilian Riedhof	Laura-Charlotte Syniawa, Florian Stetter, Christoph Waltz, Isabell Gerschke	Drama	
Romeo	Hermine Huntgeburth	Martina Gedeck, Sylvester Groth	Drama	
Run While You Can	Lars Becker	Ken Duken, Minh-Khai Phan-Thi, Katharina Böhm, Gregor Törzs	Crime	a.k.a. Rette deine Haut
Sass	Carlo Rola	Ben Becker, Jürgen Vogel, Henry Hübchen, Jeanette Hain, Julia Richter	Crime	
Scheidung mit Hindernissen	Karola Hattop	Sandra Speichert, Michael von Au, Johanna von Koczian, Ivan Desny	Comedy	
Die Scheinheiligen	Thomas Kronthaler	Maria Singer	Comedy	a.k.a. The Hypocrites
Schizo	Erwin Keusch	Markus Knüfken, Regula Grauwiller, Ellen ten Damme	Thriller	a.k.a. Im Netz der Lüge
Schlaf mit meinem Mann	Donald Kraemer	Jennifer Steffens, Bojana Golenac, Oliver Broumis, Christian Oliver, Doris Kunstmann	Comedy	
Das Schneeparadies	Erwin Keusch	Tanja Wedhorn, Andreas Brucker, Klaus Wildbolz, Diana Körner, Rosel Zech	Comedy	
Der Schuh des Manitu	Michael Herbig	Michael Herbig, Christian Tramitz, Sky du Mont, Marie Bäumer, Rick Kavanian	Parody, Western comedy	a.k.a. Manitou's Shoe
Der Schuss	Nikolaus Leytner	Lisa Martinek, Felix Eitner, Dominique Horwitz	Drama	
Das schwangere Mädchen	Bettina Woernle	Anna Brüggemann, Ken Duken	Drama	
Schwarz & McMurphy	Stephen Manuel	Wotan Wilke Möhring, Tyron Ricketts, Alexandra Neldel, Xenia Seeberg	Crime	a.k.a. Schwarz and McMurphy a.k.a. Die Großstadt-Sheriffs
Schwindelnde Höhe	Jobst Oetzmann	Ulrike Kriener, Roman Knižka, Rudolf Kowalski	Drama	
September Song	Ulli Lommel	Ulli Lommel, Katrin Schaake, Rudolf Waldemar Brem	Drama	a.k.a. Boots. American-German co-production
Sind denn alle netten Männer schwul?	Sibylle Tafel	Floriane Daniel, Marc Hosemann, Marco Rima, Nadeshda Brennicke	Comedy	
Solange wir lieben	Olaf Kreinsen	Hannelore Elsner, Michael Mendl, Marius Frey, Hanns Zischler	Drama	
Something to Remind Me	Christian Petzold	Nina Hoss, André Hennicke	Thriller	a.k.a. Toter Mann
Sommerwind	Werner Siebert	Siegfried Rauch, Heidelinde Weis	Drama	
Späte Rache	Matti Geschonneck	Christian Redl, Peer Jäger, Maja Maranow, Birge Schade, Lena Stolze	Drama	
Stones of Light	Marijan David Vajda	Uwe Ochsenknecht, Elena Sofia Ricci, Miroslav Nemec, Reiner Schöne	Thriller	a.k.a. Stern der Liebe
Das sündige Mädchen	Christoph Stark	Anna Loos, Jürgen Tarrach, Lisa Kreuzer	Drama	
Sweet Surprise	Josh Broecker	Sophie Schütt, Markus Meyer	Comedy	a.k.a. Ein Millionär zum Frühstück
Swimming Pool	Boris von Sychowski	Kristen Miller, Isla Fisher, James McAvoy, Cordelia Bugeja, John Hopkins	Horror	a.k.a. The Pool
Taking Sides	István Szabó	Harvey Keitel, Stellan Skarsgård	Drama	British-German-French-Austrian co-production
The Tanker	Werner Masten	Klaus Löwitsch, Anica Dobra	Action	a.k.a. Mayday!
Thema Nr. 1	Maria Bachmann	Antje Schmidt, Sissy Höfferer	Comedy	
Tod durch Entlassung	Christian Kohlund	Stefan Gubser, Bruno Cathomas, Brigitte Beyeler	Drama	Swiss-German co-production
Traumfrau mit Verspätung	Hans-Erich Viet	Thekla Carola Wied, Horst Buchholz, Dieter Mann	Comedy	
The Tunnel	Roland Suso Richter	Heino Ferch, Nicolette Krebitz, Alexandra Maria Lara, Sebastian Koch	Historical drama	
Umwege des Herzens	Christine Wiegand	Sonja Kirchberger, Jochen Nickel	Drama	
Und plötzlich wird es dunkel in meinem Leben	Matthias Steurer	Stefanie Schmid, Andreas Herder	Drama	
Vamp in Negligee	Berno Kürten	Gudrun Landgrebe, Walter Kreye, Nicole Heesters, Eleonore Weisgerber, Ralph Herforth, Luci van Org	Comedy	a.k.a. Der Vamp im Schlafrock
Ein Vater zum Verlieben	Sigi Rothemund	Dieter Pfaff, Simone Thomalla, Rita Russek	Comedy	
Venus and Mars	Harry Mastrogeorge	Daniela Amavia, Ryan Hurst, Lynn Redgrave, Fay Masterson, Julia Sawalha, Julie Bowen, Michael Weatherly	Comedy	a.k.a. Venus & Mars
Venus Talking	Rudolf Thome	Sabine Bach, Guntram Brattia, Roger Tebb, André Meyer, Vladimir Weigl, RP Kahl	Comedy	
Vera Brühne	Hark Bohm	Corinna Harfouch, Uwe Ochsenknecht, Ulrich Noethen, Fritz Wepper, Katja Flint	Drama	a.k.a. The Trials of Vera B.
Verbotene Küsse	Johannes Fabrick	Natalia Wörner, Ralph Herforth, Vadim Glowna, Maria Simon, Rüdiger Vogler, Marie Zielcke	Crime	
Viktor Vogel – Commercial Man	Lars Kraume	Alexander Scheer, Götz George, Chulpan Khamatova, Maria Schrader, Vadim Glowna	Comedy	a.k.a. Advertising Rules!
Vor meiner Zeit	Manfred Stelzer	Ingo Naujoks, Nadeshda Brennicke	Comedy	
Vortex	Michael Pohl	Hardy Krüger Jr., Harald Leipnitz	Science fiction	
Wambo	Jo Baier	Jürgen Tarrach	Drama	
Das Weibernest	Karola Hattop	Susanne Uhlen, Dana Vávrová, Nadja Tiller, Axel Milberg, Erich Hallhuber	Comedy	a.k.a. Wives' Nest
Wenn eine Mutter ihr Leben verspielt	Jorgo Papavassiliou	Franziska Petri	Drama	
Westend	Markus Mischkowski, Kai Maria Steinkühler	Markus Mischkowski, Kai Maria Steinkühler	Comedy	
What to Do in Case of Fire?	Gregor Schnitzler	Til Schweiger, Nadja Uhl, Klaus Löwitsch, Devid Striesow	Crime comedy	
When Grandpa Loved Rita Hayworth	Iva Švarcová	Vlastimil Brodský, Ewa Gawryluk, Vladimír Hajdu, Karen Fisher	Comedy	Czech-German-Swiss co-production
The Wound	Thomas Stiller	Alexandra Schalaudek, Horst-Günter Marx, Marek Harloff	Drama	
Zerbrechliche Zeugin	Ben Verbong	Anne Kanis, Tobias Schenke	Thriller	
Zugvögel der Liebe	Richard Engel	Maruschka Detmers, Christian Wolff	Drama	
Zum Glück verrückt – Eine unschlagbare Familie	Klaus Rumpf	Fritz Wepper, Angelika Milster	Comedy	
Die zwei Leben meines Vaters	Olaf Kreinsen	Heinz Hoenig, Matthias Koeberlin, Muriel Baumeister	Thriller	
Ein Zwilling zu viel	Thomas Bohn	Thomas Heinze, Nele Mueller-Stöfen	Crime comedy	

== 2002 ==
Title	Director	Cast	Genre	Notes
666 – Traue keinem, mit dem du schläfst!	Rainer Matsutani	Jan Josef Liefers, Armin Rohde, Sonsee Neu, Hanns Zischler, Claudia Schiffer, Boris Becker	Comedy, Fantasy	a.k.a. 666: In Bed with the Devil
Against All Evidence	Sherry Hormann	Nina Petri, Maria Simon, James Russo, Archie Kao, Jennette McCurdy, Michael Sutton	Thriller	a.k.a. My Daughter's Tears a.k.a. Meine Tochter ist keine Mörderin
Alibis for Sale	Christoph Schrewe	Julia Richter, Florian Fitz, Max Herbrechter, Antje Schmidt, Tom Wlaschiha, Fritz Karl, Sandra S. Leonhard	Comedy	a.k.a. The Night in Which Really Nobody Had Any Sex
All Around the Town	Paolo Barzman	Nastassja Kinski, Tobias Moretti, Andrea Roth, Michael Shanks, Ron Lea, Kim Schraner	Thriller	Canadian-French-British-American-German co-production
Alles getürkt!	Yasemin Şamdereli	Bürger Lars Dietrich, Türkiz Talay, Hilmi Sözer	Comedy	
Am Ende des Tunnels	Dror Zahavi	Ulrike Kriener, Armin Rohde, Günther Maria Halmer	Drama	
Am Ende die Wahrheit	Michael Rowitz	Jennifer Nitsch, Tim Bergmann, Katharina Wackernagel	Thriller	
Amen.	Costa-Gavras	Ulrich Tukur, Mathieu Kassovitz, Ulrich Mühe	War drama	a.k.a. Der Stellvertreter. French-German-Romanian co-production
Andreas Hofer	Xaver Schwarzenberger	Tobias Moretti, Franz Xaver Kroetz, Martina Gedeck, Julia Stemberger, Heio von Stetten, Ottfried Fischer, Günther Maria Halmer, Gregor Bloéb	Biography	a.k.a. The Freedom of the Eagle. Austrian-German co-production
Der Anwalt und sein Gast	Torsten C. Fischer	Götz George, Heino Ferch, Claudia Michelsen, Marie Zielcke, Julia Jäger	Thriller	
Aszendent Liebe	Helmut Metzger	Anica Dobra, Peter Sattmann, Sonja Kirchberger, Brigitte Mira	Comedy	a.k.a. Love in the Ascendant
At Night in the Park	Uwe Janson	Heino Ferch, Heike Makatsch, Pasquale Aleardi, Michael Degen, Bela B	Thriller	a.k.a. Night in the Park
Aus lauter Liebe zu Dir	Ariane Zeller	Claudine Wilde, Max Herbrechter, Michael Roll, Edith Hancke	Comedy	a.k.a. Out of Sheer Love for You
Baader	Christopher Roth	Frank Giering, Laura Tonke, Vadim Glowna, Jana Pallaske	Thriller	
Baby	Philipp Stölzl	Alice Dwyer, Lars Rudolph, Filip Peeters	Drama	
Beloved Sister	Oskar Roehler	Iris Berben, Hannelore Elsner	Drama	a.k.a. Fahr zur Hölle, Schwester!
Das beste Stück	Oliver Schmitz	Jan Sosniok, Doreen Jacobi, Nina Bott	Comedy	
Bibi Blocksberg	Hermine Huntgeburth	Sidonie von Krosigk, Corinna Harfouch, Katja Riemann, Ulrich Noethen	Family	
Big Girls Don't Cry	Maria von Heland	Anna Maria Mühe, Karoline Herfurth	Drama	
Bis dass dein Tod uns scheidet	Manfred Stelzer	Senta Berger, Günther Maria Halmer	Comedy	
Bobby	Vivian Naefe	Veronica Ferres, Bobby Brederlow, Markus Knüfken, Steffen Groth, Hansa Czypionka	Drama	
Boran	Alexander Berner	Matthias Habich, Henry Hübchen, Mehmet Kurtuluş, Lisa Martinek	Crime	
Bungalow	Ulrich Köhler	Lennie Burmeister, Trine Dyrholm, Devid Striesow	Drama	
City of God	Fernando Meirelles, Kátia Lund (co-director)	Alexandre Rodrigues, Leandro Firmino Da Hora, Jonathan Haagensen, Phellipe Haagensen, Douglas Silva, Daniel Zettel, Seu Jorge	Epic crime	Brazilian-French-German co-production
The Code of Life	Miguel Alexandre	Désirée Nosbusch	Thriller	
Davon stirbt man nicht	Christine Hartmann	Jürgen Prochnow, Suzanne von Borsody, Mathieu Carrière, Bernadette Heerwagen	Thriller	
Deadline	Marc Hertel	Sophie Schütt, Hansa Czypionka, Gregor Törzs, Walter Kreye, Tobias Schenke	Disaster	a.k.a. Die Explosion – U-Bahn-Ticket in den Tod
Deadly Rendezvous	Wolf Gremm	Heiner Lauterbach, Sandra Speichert, Heinz Hoenig	Thriller	
Dein Mann wird mir gehören!	Gerhard Hroß	Stefanie Schmid, Mark Kuhn, Sabine Vitua	Drama	
Detective Lovelorn and the Revenge of the Pharaoh	Thomas Frick	Mišel Matičević, Horst Buchholz, Eva Hassmann, Reiner Schöne	Fantasy	
Die Dickköpfe	Walter Bannert	Ottfried Fischer, Harald Krassnitzer, April Hailer, Hanno Koffler	Comedy, Sport	Austrian-German co-production
Do Fish Do It?	Almut Getto	Tino Mewes	Drama	
Dog Heads	Karsten Laske	Arnd Klawitter, Axel Prahl	Drama	a.k.a. Hundsköpfe
Dracula	Roger Young	Patrick Bergin, Giancarlo Giannini, Stefania Rocca, Hardy Krüger Jr., Muriel Baumeister, Kai Wiesinger	Horror	a.k.a. Dracula's Curse. Italian-German co-production
Drei Frauen, ein Plan und die ganz große Kohle	Reinhard Schwabenitzky	Tina Ruland, Elfi Eschke, Meral Perin, Marco Rima, Tim Seyfi	Crime comedy	a.k.a. 3 Frauen, ein Plan und die ganz große Kohle
Elephant Heart	Züli Aladağ	Daniel Brühl, Manfred Zapatka, Jochen Nickel	Drama	
Epstein's Night	Urs Egger	Mario Adorf, Bruno Ganz, Otto Tausig, Günter Lamprecht, Annie Girardot, Nina Hoss	Drama	
Extreme Ops	Christian Duguay	Devon Sawa, Bridgette Wilson, Rupert Graves, Rufus Sewell, Klaus Löwitsch	Action thriller	British-German co-production
Die fabelhaften Schwestern	Michael Steinke	Cosma Shiva Hagen, Esther Schweins, Tina Ruland, Uwe Friedrichsen, Peter Kraus	Musical	
Familie XXL	Peter Timm	Ursula Karven, Esther Schweins, Oliver Stokowski, Gregor Törzs, Kostja Ullmann	Comedy	
Family Affairs – Gier nach Glück	Matthias Steurer	Sylke Hannasky, Götz Otto, Christiane Krüger	Drama	
FeardotCom	William Malone	Stephen Dorff, Natascha McElhone, Stephen Rea, Udo Kier, Gesine Cukrowski, Anna Thalbach, Matthias Schweighöfer	Horror	American-British-Canadian-Luxembourgish-German co-production
Feuer, Eis & Dosenbier	Mathias Dinter	Axel Stein, Rick Kavanian, Eva Habermann, Herbert Fux, Christoph M. Ohrt	Teen film, Comedy	a.k.a. Fire, Ice and Canned Beer a.k.a. Feuer, Eis und Dosenbier
Final Hope	Marc Rothemund	Anneke Kim Sarnau, Axel Prahl	Drama	a.k.a. Hope Dies Last
Flitterwochen im Treppenhaus	Markus Bräutigam	Susanna Simon, Steffen Wink, Doreen Jacobi	Comedy	
Franz und Anna	Robert Adrian Pejo	Heio von Stetten, Julia Urban, Michael Mendl, August Schmölzer	Drama	
Die Frauenversteher – Männer unter sich	Jan Josef Liefers	Jan Josef Liefers, Anna Loos, Aleksandar Jovanovic, Reinhard Mey	Comedy	
Friends of Friends	Dominik Graf	Matthias Schweighöfer, Sabine Timoteo, Florian Stetter, Jessica Schwarz	Drama	
Führer Ex	Winfried Bonengel	Aaron Hildebrand, Christian Blümel, Dieter Laser	Drama	
Gebürtig	Robert Schindel, Lukas Stepanik	Peter Simonischek, Ruth Rieser, August Zirner, Katja Weitzenböck, Daniel Olbrychski	Drama	Austrian-German co-production
Gefährliche Nähe und du ahnst nichts	Hartmut Schoen	Hans-Michael Rehberg, Claudia Michelsen, Tobias Moretti, Henry Hübchen	Thriller	
Geht nicht gibt's nicht	René Heisig	Bernadette Heerwagen, Sebastian Ströbel, Axel Prahl	Drama	
Ein Geschenk der Liebe	Dagmar Damek	Francis Fulton-Smith, Annika Pages, Gaby Dohm, Andrea Lüdke	Drama	
Ghettokids	Christian Wagner	Ioannis Tsialas, Barbara Rudnik, Günther Maria Halmer	Drama	
Grill Point	Andreas Dresen	Axel Prahl, Steffi Kühnert, Thorsten Merten, Gabriela Maria Schmeide	Drama	a.k.a. Halbe Treppe
Half the Rent	Marc Ottiker	Stephan Kampwirth	Crime	
Hand in Hand	Maria Teresa Camoglio	Nadja Bobyleva, Andreas Christ, Leslie Malton, Sophie Rois	Drama	
Hanna's Baby	Diethard Klante	Johanna Klante, Heikko Deutschmann, Hans Peter Hallwachs, Renate Krößner, Thomas Thieme, Devid Striesow, Hans Peter Korff, Frank Giering	Thriller	
Harte Brötchen	Tim Trageser	Katharina Thalbach, Herbert Knaup, Uwe Ochsenknecht	Comedy, Fantasy	
Heart of America	Uwe Boll	Jürgen Prochnow, Michael Paré, María Conchita Alonso	Drama	German-Canadian co-production
Heart or Cash	Michael Rowitz	Gudrun Landgrebe, Günther Maria Halmer, Ingo Naujoks, Julian Weigend, Marie Zielcke, Minh-Khai Phan-Thi, Claudia Mehnert	Comedy	
Heaven	Tom Tykwer	Cate Blanchett, Giovanni Ribisi	Drama	American-Italian-German-British-French co-production
Herz in Flammen	Berno Kürten	Anja Kling, Andreas Brucker, Max Tidof, Ralf Wolter, Ilja Richter	Comedy	a.k.a. The Romantic Novelist
Himmelreich auf Erden	Torsten C. Fischer	Christiane Paul, Frederic Welter, Wotan Wilke Möhring, Günther Maria Halmer	Drama	
Die Hochzeit auf dem Lande	Gloria Behrens	Lara Joy Körner, Mathieu Carrière, Pierre Brice, Gila von Weitershausen, Siegfried Rauch	Drama	
Hochzeit auf Raten	Jan Ruzicka	Floriane Daniel, Heinrich Schmieder, Andreas Brucker, Birge Schade	Comedy	
Hotte in Paradise	Dominik Graf	Mišel Matičević, Isabell Gerschke, Stefanie Stappenbeck, Nadeshda Brennicke, Birge Schade	Crime drama	
Hounds and Jackals	Michael Steinke	Anja Kruse, Helmut Zierl, Sky du Mont, Hugh Armstrong	Adventure	a.k.a. Spiel des Schicksals
The House of Fear	Florian Richter	Benjamin Sadler	Thriller	a.k.a. Zimmer der Angst
The Hunt for the Hidden Relic	Sebastian Niemann	Matthias Koeberlin, Naike Rivelli	Adventure	a.k.a. Jesus Video
I'm the Father	Dani Levy	Sebastian Blomberg, Maria Schrader, Christiane Paul, Ulrich Noethen, Rolf Zacher, Marion Kracht, Rosel Zech, Lena Stolze, Christoph Bantzer	Comedy	a.k.a. Väter
Ich bring Dich hinter Gitter	Daniel Helfer	Herbert Knaup, Karin Giegerich	Thriller	
If It Don't Fit, Use a Bigger Hammer	Peter Thorwarth	Dietmar Bär, Ralf Richter, Hilmi Sözer, Alexandra Maria Lara	Comedy	a.k.a. Was nicht passt, wird passend gemacht
Im Chaos der Gefühle	Diethard Klante	Franziska Walser, Anna Schudt, Edgar Selge, Ernst Jacobi	Drama	
Impressionen unter Wasser	Leni Riefenstahl		Documentary	a.k.a. Underwater Impressions a.k.a. Impressions of the Deep
Joe and Max	Steve James	Leonard Roberts, Til Schweiger, Richard Roundtree	Biography, Sport	American-German co-production
Juls Freundin	Kai Wessel	Anneke Kim Sarnau, Jacob Matschenz	Drama	
June Moon	Hanno Hackfort	Laura Tonke, Oliver Mommsen	Drama	
Just Say Yes	Karen Müller	Tina Ruland, Henning Baum, Michaela May, Christian Kohlund, Martin Lüttge	Comedy	a.k.a. Sag einfach Ja
Die Katzenfrau	Martin Enlen	Erika Marozsán, Ulrich Reinthaller, Sonsee Neu, Simon Schwarz, Michael Mendl	Drama	
Kein Mann für eine Nummer	Jakob Schäuffelen	Heio von Stetten, Anne Brendler, Corinna Nilson	Comedy	
Kiss and Run	Annette Ernst	Maggie Peren, Ken Duken, Hinnerk Schönemann	Comedy	
Klaras Hochzeit	Christian Görlitz	Christiane Hörbiger, Omero Antonutti, Dietrich Mattausch	Comedy	
Der kleine Mann	Matthias Steurer	Oliver Korittke, Valentina Sauca	Comedy	
Kolle – Ein Leben für Liebe und Sex	Susanne Zanke	Sylvester Groth, Annett Renneberg, Petra Zieser	Biography	a.k.a. Oswalt Kolle
Kubaner küssen besser	Thorsten Schmidt	Andrea Cleven, Julio Quesada, Christian Kahrmann, Oliver Kalkofe	Comedy	
Das letzte Versteck	Pierre Koralnik	Johanna Wokalek, Agnieszka Piwowarska	War	a.k.a. The Journey. German-Swiss co-production
Liebe darf alles	Karl Kases	Gudrun Landgrebe, Hans Werner Meyer, Miroslav Nemec, Dietmar Schönherr	Drama	Remake of Reckless (1997)
Liebe ist ein Roman	Olaf Götz	Ursula Buschhorn, Sigmar Solbach	Comedy	
Liebe ist die halbe Miete	Gabi Kubach	Götz George, Thekla Carola Wied	Comedy	
Liebe ohne Fahrschein	Erwin Keusch	Heio von Stetten, Juliane Kosarev	Comedy	
Liebe und Verrat	Mark Schlichter	Wotan Wilke Möhring, Alexandra Maria Lara, Heinz Hoenig, Richy Müller	Sport, Crime	
Liebe unter Verdacht	Jorgo Papavassiliou	Natalia Wörner, Max Tidof, Walter Kreye, Michael Degen	Crime	
Liebling, bring die Hühner ins Bett	Matthias Tiefenbacher	Barbara Rudnik, Axel Milberg, Thomas Thieme	Comedy	a.k.a. Darling, Put the Chickens to Bed
The Longing	Iain Dilthey	Susanne-Marie Wrage	Drama	
Love Crash	Donald Kraemer	Valerie Niehaus, Stephan Luca, Lisa Kreuzer	Comedy	
A Map of the Heart	Dominik Graf	Karoline Eichhorn, Antonio Wannek	Drama	a.k.a. Der Felsen
Maximum Speed	Sigi Rothemund	Erdoğan Atalay, Walter Kreye, Rolf Zacher, Bojana Golenac	Action thriller	
Mehr als nur Sex	Claudia Garde	Anneke Kim Sarnau, Claudio Caiolo, Thomas Sarbacher, Gisela Schneeberger	Comedy	
Mit dem Rücken zur Wand	Thorsten Näter	Oliver Bröcker	Crime	
Mord an Bord	Edzard Onneken	Barbara Wussow, Stefan Jürgens, Edith Hancke	Black comedy, Music	a.k.a. Murder on Board
Mörderherz	Christian Görlitz	Günther Maria Halmer, Julia Stemberger, Ulrich Matthes	Thriller	
More Ants in the Pants	Granz Henman	Tobias Schenke, Axel Stein, Diana Amft, Axel Milberg, Christine Neubauer	Comedy	a.k.a. Ants in the Pants 2 a.k.a. Knallharte Jungs
Die Mutter	Matti Geschonneck	Martina Gedeck, Harald Krassnitzer	Drama	
My First Miracle	Anne Wild	Henriette Confurius, Leonard Lansink, Juliane Köhler, Gabriela Maria Schmeide	Drama	a.k.a. Mein erstes Wunder
My Last Film	Oliver Hirschbiegel	Hannelore Elsner	Drama	
Naked	Doris Dörrie	Heike Makatsch, Jürgen Vogel, Nina Hoss, Alexandra Maria Lara	Drama	
Nancy & Frank – A Manhattan Love Story	Wolf Gremm	Frances Anderson, Hardy Krüger Jr., Robert Wagner, Gottfried John, Jamie Harris	Comedy	a.k.a. Nancy and Frank – A Manhattan Love Story
Nicht Fisch, nicht Fleisch	Matthias Keilich	Ill-Young Kim, Ju Youn Kim, Lisa Kreuzer	Comedy	a.k.a. Neither Fish, Nor Fowl
Ninas Geschichte	Joseph Orr	Henriette Heinze, Simon Schwarz, Julia Bremermann, Henning Peker, Hermann Lause, Bettina Kurth	Fantasy	
Nogo	Sabine Hiebler, Gerhard Ertl	Jasmin Tabatabai, Jürgen Vogel, Meret Becker, Oliver Korittke, Mavie Hörbiger, Michael Ostrowski	Drama	Austrian-German co-production
Die Novizin	Anno Saul	Kathrin Kühnel, Minh-Khai Phan-Thi, Irm Hermann, Stephan Kampwirth	Drama	a.k.a. The Novice
One Hell of a Night	Stephan Wagner	Christoph Waltz, Anica Dobra, Armin Rohde, Iris Berben, Hannes Jaenicke, Vadim Glowna	Comedy	a.k.a. Business Trip a.k.a. Dienstreise – Was für eine Nacht
One Lover Is Not Enough	Wolf Gremm	Tina Ruland, Herbert Herrmann, Helmut Zierl	Comedy	a.k.a. One Lover Too Much Is Still Not Enough
Operation Rubikon	Thomas Berger	Maria Schrader, Hilmar Thate, Martin Feifel, Jörg Schüttauf, Christian Redl	Thriller	
Over Night	Horst Krassa	Tai Elshorst, Frank Wünsche	Drama	
Paradise Is a Trap	Manfred Stelzer	Armin Rohde, Ingo Naujoks, Florian Lukas	Comedy, Music	a.k.a. Tournee ins Paradies
Paule and Julia	Torsten Löhn	Marlon Kittel, Oona Devi Liebich, Arnel Tači	Crime	
Pest – Die Rückkehr	Niki Stein	Tim Bergmann, Antje Schmidt, Hannelore Hoger, Dietmar Bär	Disaster	
The Pianist	Roman Polanski	Adrien Brody, Thomas Kretschmann, Frank Finlay	Drama, War	French-British-German-Polish co-production
Pigs Will Fly	Eoin Moore	Andreas Schmidt, Laura Tonke, Thomas Morris	Drama	
Pommery und Putenbrust	Manfred Stelzer	Mareike Carrière, Armin Rohde, Eva Hassmann, Katharina Thalbach, Karl Kranzkowski, Pierre Besson	Comedy	a.k.a. Pommery & Putenbrust a.k.a. Pommery and Turkey Breast
Portrait of a Married Couple	Isabelle Stever	Maria Simon, Nils Nelleßen	Drama	a.k.a. Erste Ehe
Pretend You Don't See Her	René Bonnière	Emma Samms, Hannes Jaenicke, Beau Starr, Reiner Schöne	Thriller	Canadian-British-American-German co-production
Problemzone Mann	Felix Dünnemann	Elena Uhlig, Steffen Groth, Gudrun Landgrebe	Comedy	
Resident Evil	Paul W. S. Anderson	Milla Jovovich, Michelle Rodriguez, Heike Makatsch	Action, Horror	German-British co-production
Santa Claudia	Andi Niessner	Deborah Kaufmann, Thomas Limpinsel, Herbert Feuerstein, Hugo Egon Balder	Comedy	
Schleudertrauma	Johannes Fabrick	Tim Bergmann, Laura Tonke, Natalia Wörner, Alexandra Maria Lara, Anja Kling	Drama	
Schneemann sucht Schneefrau	Marco Serafini	Katja Weitzenböck, Fritz Karl, Rosemarie Fendel, Michael Roll	Comedy	German-Austrian co-production
Die schöne Braut in Schwarz	Carlo Rola	Iris Berben, Claudia Michelsen, Gottfried John, Ken Duken, Julian Weigend, Henry Hübchen	Crime	
School Trip	Henner Winckler	Steven Sperling, Sophie Kempe, Bartek Blaszczyk	Drama	a.k.a. Klassenfahrt
Seven Moves to Checkmate	Thomas Roth	Bettina Zimmermann, Thure Riefenstein, Jürgen Tarrach	Crime comedy	a.k.a. Geliebte Diebin
Shattered Glass	Chris Kraus	Jürgen Vogel, Margit Carstensen	Drama	a.k.a. Scherbentanz
Singapore Express	Hans Werner	Barbara Wussow, Daniel Morgenroth, Pinkas Braun, Horst Bollmann, Karl Walter Diess	Thriller	
The Sisters' House	Rolf von Sydow	Gudrun Landgrebe, Max Tidof, Charlotte Schwab, Hardy Krüger Jr., Christine Reinhart, Harald Krassnitzer, Günther Maria Halmer	Drama	a.k.a. The House of the Sisters
So schnell du kannst	Vivian Naefe	Nicolette Krebitz, Lucas Gregorowicz	Drama	
Solino	Fatih Akın	Moritz Bleibtreu	Drama	
Sophiiiie!	Michael Hofmann	Katharina Schüttler	Drama	
Step on It	Sabine Derflinger	Henriette Heinze	Drama	a.k.a. Vollgas. Austrian-German co-production
Storno	Elke Weber-Moore	Fanny Staffa, Paula Paul, Simon Schwarz, Cornelius Schwalm, Andreas Patton	Comedy	
Tanners letzte Chance	Ernst Josef Lauscher	Robert Atzorn, Katharina Müller-Elmau, Hanns Zischler, Ingo Naujoks, Joachim Hansen	Crime	
Tattoo	Robert Schwentke	August Diehl, Christian Redl	Thriller	
Therapie und Praxis	René Heisig	Thomas Heinze, Herbert Knaup, Nina Kronjäger, Ann-Kathrin Kramer	Comedy	
The Time of Passion	Anna Justice	Muriel Baumeister, Francis Fulton-Smith, Pierre Besson	Drama	a.k.a. Gefühle im Sturm
Todeslust	Michael Keusch	Doreen Jacobi, Anatole Taubman	Thriller	
Tödliches Vertrauen	Johannes Grieser	Barbara Rudnik, Otto Sander, Christian Redl, Thomas Sarbacher	Thriller	
Toskana-Karussell	Peter Patzak	Franco Nero, Susanne Lothar, Rüdiger Vogler, Sean Gullette, Jacques Breuer, Gregor Bloéb, Dieter Laser	Crime	a.k.a. Die achte Todsünde: Toskana-Karussell a.k.a. Die 8. Todsünde: Toskana-Karussell
Trenck	Gernot Roll	Ben Becker, Alexandra Maria Lara, August Zirner, Hannes Jaenicke, Rolf Hoppe, Matthias Habich	Adventure	
Der Unbestechliche	Erwin Keusch	Christian Berkel, Andrea Sawatzki, Walter Kreye	Drama	
Unser Papa, das Genie	Sabine Landgraeber	Friedrich von Thun, Simone Thomalla, Charles Brauer, Sólveig Arnarsdóttir, Ruth Maria Kubitschek, Ingo Naujoks	Comedy, Science fiction	
An Unusual Affair	Maris Pfeiffer	Hans Werner Meyer, Matthias Walter, Tatjana Blacher	Drama	
Vaya con Dios	Zoltan Spirandelli	Michael Gwisdek, Daniel Brühl, Chiara Schoras	Comedy	
Verdammte Gefühle	Peter Lichtefeld	Barbara Rudnik, Thomas Sarbacher	Drama	
Der Verehrer	Dagmar Damek	Ursula Buschhorn, Bernhard Schir, Florian Fitz, Ellen ten Damme	Thriller	a.k.a. The Admirer
Verlorenes Land	Jo Baier	Martina Gedeck, Merab Ninidze, Monica Bleibtreu, Nina Kunzendorf	Drama	
Verrückt nach Paris	Eike Besuden, Pago Balke	Wolfgang Göttsch, Paula Kleine, Frank Grabski, Dominique Horwitz	Comedy	a.k.a. Crazy About Paris
Vienna	Peter Gersina	Roman Knižka, Max Tidof, Axel Milberg, Elke Winkens, Erika Marozsán	Drama	Austrian-German co-production
Vollweib sucht Halbtagsmann	Helmut Metzger	Christine Neubauer, Markus Knüfken, Florian Fitz, Ralf Wolter	Comedy	a.k.a. Complete Woman Needs Half-Time Man
Wann ist der Mann ein Mann?	Dietmar Klein	Heio von Stetten, Esther Schweins, Julia Bremermann	Comedy	
Weihnachtsmann gesucht	Uwe Janson	Christoph Waltz, Barbara Auer, Pasquale Aleardi, Julia Stinshoff	Comedy	
Weil ich gut bin!	Miguel Alexandre	Tom Schilling, Julia Hummer	Crime	
Wen küsst die Braut?	Lars Montag	Mina Tander, Marco Girnth, Henning Baum, Ivonne Schönherr	Comedy	a.k.a. No Risk, No Love
Wenn die Liebe verloren geht	Tom Toelle	Ulli Philipp, Hanns Zischler, Mario Irrek, Doris Kunstmann	Drama	
Wenn zwei sich trauen	Erwin Keusch	Axel Milberg, Marie-Lou Sellem, Aglaia Szyszkowitz, Oliver Mommsen	Comedy	
Wer liebt, hat Recht	Matti Geschonneck	Iris Berben, Robert Atzorn, Sibylle Canonica, Ulrike Kriener, Michael Gwisdek	Drama	
Die Westentaschenvenus	Kirsten Peters	Jeanette Hain, Jochen Horst	Comedy	a.k.a. Vest Pocket Venus
The White Sound	Hans Weingartner	Daniel Brühl, Anabelle Lachatte	Drama	a.k.a. Das weiße Rauschen
Wie die Karnickel	Sven Unterwaldt	Michael Lott, Anna Böttcher, Sven Walser	Comedy	a.k.a. Like Rabbits
The Woman Who Doubted Dr. Fabian	Andi Rogenhagen	Dieter Pfaff	Crime comedy	
The Year of the First Kiss	Kai Wessel	Oliver Korittke, Max Mauff, Diane Willems, Thomas Drechsel, Johanna ter Steege	Comedy	
Die Zeit mit dir	Karola Hattop	Katharina Böhm, Michael Roll	Drama	a.k.a. Zerbrechlichkeit des Herzens
Zu nah am Feuer	Dietmar Klein	Maria Furtwängler, Michael Mendl, Pierre Besson	Drama	
Zwei Affären und eine Hochzeit	Michael Keusch	Katja Flint, Gedeon Burkhard, Axel Milberg	Comedy	
Zwei Affären und noch mehr Kinder	Wolfram Paulus	Udo Wachtveitl, Sissy Höfferer, Hans Sigl, Marion Mitterhammer	Drama	a.k.a. Regentage. Austrian-German co-production
Zwei Seiten der Liebe	Bodo Fürneisen	Thekla Carola Wied, Heikko Deutschmann, Fritz Karl, Hanns Zischler, Miguel Herz-Kestranek, Oliver Bootz, Valerie Koch	Drama	a.k.a. Two Sides of Love

== 2003 ==
Title	Director	Cast	Genre	Notes
4 Freunde und 4 Pfoten	Gabriele Heberling	Jan-Gregor Kremp, Alexander Gaul, Kai-Michael Muller, Martha Reckers, Nicole Müller	Comedy	
ABC des Lebens	Titus Selge	Jan-Gregor Kremp, Anica Dobra	Drama	
Adam & Eva	Paul Harather	Marie Bäumer, Simon Schwarz, Pierre Besson, Anna Bertheau	Comedy	a.k.a. Adam und Eva. Remake of Adam & Eva (1997)
Alles Samba	Bernd Böhlich	Gudrun Landgrebe, Amy Mußul, Günther Maria Halmer, Ulrich Mühe, Ernst Stankovski	Comedy	a.k.a. Nothing but Samba
Alltag	Neco Çelik	Florian Panzner, Neelesha Barthel, Erhan Emre, Kida Khodr Ramadan	Drama	a.k.a. Everyday
Alpenglühen	Hajo Gies	Götz George, Christiane Hörbiger	Comedy	
Amundsen the Penguin	Stephen Manuel	Lea Kurka, Harald Krassnitzer, Claude-Oliver Rudolph, Till Lindemann	Family	
Anatomy 2	Stefan Ruzowitzky	Heike Makatsch, Barnaby Metschurat, Herbert Knaup, Wotan Wilke Möhring, August Diehl, Rosel Zech, Frank Giering, Roman Knižka, Franka Potente	Horror	
Die andere Eva	Gloria Behrens	Sonsee Neu, Günther Maria Halmer, Günther Schramm, Hansa Czypionka	Drama	
Angst	Oskar Roehler	André Hennicke, Marie Bäumer, Vadim Glowna, Herbert Knaup, Christoph Waltz, Eva Habermann, Catherine Flemming	Drama	a.k.a. Der alte Affe Angst
Annas Heimkehr	Xaver Schwarzenberger	Veronica Ferres, Herbert Knaup, Julia Stemberger, Karl Markovics, Jens Harzer	War	Austrian-German co-production
Der Aufstand	Hans-Christoph Blumenberg	Jürgen Vogel, Jan Josef Liefers, Uwe Bohm, Stefanie Stappenbeck, Herbert Knaup, Florian Lukas, Christian Redl, Dieter Mann, Gojko Mitic	Docudrama	
Aus Liebe zu Deutschland – Eine Spendenaffäre	Raymond Ley	Klaus Manchen, Ulrich Voß, Rüdiger Vogler, Günther Schramm, Christian Doermer	Docudrama	
Babiy Yar	Jeff Kanew	Michael Degen, Barbara De Rossi, Katrin Sass, Axel Milberg	War	American-German-Belarusian co-production
Baltic Storm	Reuben Leder	Greta Scacchi, Jürgen Prochnow, Donald Sutherland	Thriller	British-German co-production
Ein Banker zum Verlieben	Marco Serafini	Fritz Karl, Julia Brendler	Comedy	
Berlin Blues	Leander Haußmann	Christian Ulmen, Detlev Buck, Katja Danowski	Comedy	a.k.a. Herr Lehmann
Berlin – Eine Stadt sucht den Mörder	Urs Egger	Annett Renneberg, Heikko Deutschmann, Anna Brüggemann	Thriller	
Betty – Schön wie der Tod	Peter Keglevic	Claudia Michelsen, Udo Kier, Erol Sander	Crime	
Beyond the Limits	Olaf Ittenbach	Darren Shahlavi, Xenia Seeberg	Horror	
Blueprint	Rolf Schübel	Franka Potente	Science fiction	
Carolina	Marleen Gorris	Julia Stiles, Shirley MacLaine	Romantic comedy	American-German co-production
Cats' Tongues	Torsten C. Fischer	Meret Becker, Ina Weisse, Birge Schade	Drama	a.k.a. Cat Tongues
Claras Schatz	Hans-Erich Viet	Hannelore Elsner, Paolo Malco, Rudolf Kowalski, Lisa Kreuzer	Drama	
Cleaning Up	Sharon von Wietersheim	Valerie Niehaus, Tim Bergmann, Gedeon Burkhard, Billie Zöckler	Comedy	a.k.a. Das bisschen Haushalt
Coronado	Claudio Fäh	Kristin Dattilo, Clayton Rohner, John Rhys-Davies	Adventure	German-American co-production
Crazy Race	Michael Keusch	Kai Lentrodt, Julia Stinshoff, Dirk Bach, Christian Tramitz, Ottfried Fischer, Sissi Perlinger, Katy Karrenbauer, Ingolf Lück	Comedy	
Cruel Friends	Ute Wieland	Andreas Guenther, Torben Liebrecht, Manuel Cortez, Johanna Klante	Thriller	a.k.a. Eiskalte Freunde
Dann kamst du	Susanne Hake	Katharina Böhm, Jan-Gregor Kremp, Jophi Ries	Comedy	
Detroit	Carsten Ludwig, Jan-Christoph Glaser	Christoph Bach	Drama	
Dirty Sky	Andy Bausch	Cosma Shiva Hagen, Nikolai Kinski, Claude-Oliver Rudolph	Crime	
Distant Lights	Hans-Christian Schmid	August Diehl, Zbigniew Zamachowski, Ivan Shvedoff	Drama	a.k.a. Lichter
Echte Männer?	Christian Zübert	Wotan Wilke Möhring, Barnaby Metschurat, Christiane Paul	Comedy	
Eierdiebe	Robert Schwentke	Wotan Wilke Möhring, Julia Hummer	Comedy	a.k.a. The Family Jewels
Einspruch für die Liebe	Helmut Metzger	Heio von Stetten, Julia Richter, Gesine Cukrowski	Comedy	
Ein Engel und Paul	Manfred Stelzer	Pierre Besson, Eva Hassmann, Gunda Ebert, Ingo Naujoks	Drama	
Er oder keiner	Marco Serafini	Florian Fitz, Muriel Baumeister, Julia Thurnau	Comedy	
Familienkreise	Stefan Krohmer	Götz George, Hans-Jochen Wagner, Sophie von Kessel, Tobias Oertel, Jutta Lampe, Katja Gaub	Drama	
Fast perfekt verlobt	Rolf Silber	Reiner Schöne, Maria Simon, André Röhner, Kristian Kiehling	Comedy	
The Flying Classroom	Tomy Wigand	Ulrich Noethen, Sebastian Koch, Piet Klocke	Family	
Fools	Tom Schreiber	Christoph Bach	Drama	
The Forest for the Trees	Maren Ade	Eva Löbau, Daniela Holtz	Drama	
Die fremde Frau	Matthias Glasner	Corinna Harfouch, Ulrich Tukur	Thriller	
Fremder Freund	Elmar Fischer	Navíd Akhavan, Antonio Wannek, Mina Tander	Thriller	a.k.a. The Friend
Für immer verloren	Uwe Janson	Veronica Ferres, Walter Sittler, Pasquale Aleardi, Erol Sander, Frederic Welter	Crime drama	
Der Fußfesselmörder	Michael Karen	Esther Zimmering, Filip Peeters	Thriller	
Für immer für dich	Lih Janowitz	Nina Hoger, Helmut Berger	Drama	
Ganz und gar	Marco Kreuzpaintner	David Rott, Mira Bartuschek, Hanno Koffler, Maggie Peren, Diana Amft, Herbert Knaup	Comedy	a.k.a. Breaking Loose
Garden of Love	Olaf Ittenbach	Natacza Boon, Bela B	Horror	
Gate to Heaven	Veit Helmer	Masumeh Makhija, Valery Nikolaev, Udo Kier, Burt Kwouk	Comedy	
Geheime Geschichten	Christine Wiegand	Martina Gedeck, Ulrich Noethen	Drama	
Die Geisel	Christian Görlitz	Suzanne von Borsody, Jürgen Vogel, Sylvester Groth, Oliver Stokowski, Christian Redl, Ralph Herforth	Crime	
Gelübde des Herzens	Karola Hattop	Sandra Speichert, Thorsten Grasshoff, Christian Kohlund, Hanns Zischler	Drama	
Geschlecht: weiblich	Dirk Kummer	Ulrike Krumbiegel, Adriana Altaras, Inga Busch, Sabine Orléans, Matthias Koeberlin, Alice Dwyer	Drama	
Gestern gibt es nicht	Marco Serafini	Jan Niklas, Suzanne von Borsody, Klaus J. Behrendt	Drama	
Der gestohlene Mond	Thomas Stiller	Birol Ünel, Lisa Martinek, Dietmar Bär, Ivan Shvedoff, Sabine Vitua	Comedy	
Getting a Life	Vivian Naefe	Nadja Bobyleva, Matthias Habich, Dana Vávrová, Florian David Fitz	Drama	a.k.a. Raus ins Leben
Girl's Life, Boy's World	Hansjörg Thurn	Jana Petersen, Florian Jahr, Tim Sander, Vinzenz Kiefer, David Winter, Manuel Cortez, Karoline Schuch, Laura Osswald, Sissi Perlinger, Doris Kunstmann	Comedy	a.k.a. Seventeen – Mädchen sind die besseren Jungs
Das Glück ihres Lebens	Bernd Böhlich	Thekla Carola Wied, Walter Kreye, Thorsten Grasshoff, Katja Woywood	Drama	a.k.a. Joy of Her Life
Good Bye, Lenin!	Wolfgang Becker	Daniel Brühl, Katrin Sass, Florian Lukas, Chulpan Khamatova, Maria Simon	Ostalgie	Nom. for Golden Globe, +31 wins +14 nom.
Gun-Shy	Dito Tsintsadze	Fabian Hinrichs, Lavinia Wilson, Johan Leysen, Christoph Waltz	Crime drama	a.k.a. Schussangst
Heimatfilm!	Daniel Krauss	Fritzi Haberlandt, Hannes Jaenicke, RP Kahl, İlknur Boyraz, Annika Blendl	Drama	
Hero of the Gladiators	Jorgo Papavassiliou	Stephan Luca, Andrea Cleven, Dierk Prawdzik, Henning Baum, Ralf Moeller	Sword-and-sandal	
Hierankl	Hans Steinbichler	Johanna Wokalek, Barbara Sukowa, Josef Bierbichler, Peter Simonischek, Frank Giering, Alexander Beyer	Drama	a.k.a. A Birthday to Remember
House of the Dead	Uwe Boll	Jürgen Prochnow, Jonathan Cherry, Ona Grauer	Horror	Canadian-German-American co-production
I'll Lend You My Man	Gabi Kubach	Ursula Buschhorn, Heio von Stetten, Floriane Daniel, Miroslav Nemec	Comedy	
Identity Kills	Sören Voigt	Brigitte Hobmeier	Thriller	
Im Namen des Herrn	Bernd Fischerauer	Heiner Lauterbach, Jennifer Nitsch	Drama	
In Search of an Impotent Man	John Henderson	Katrin Weisser, Sandra S. Leonhard, Tim Williams, Dirk Bach, Wigald Boning, Heiner Lauterbach	Comedy	a.k.a. Suche impotenten Mann fürs Leben
In the Lioness' Den	Helmut Metzger	Jennifer Nitsch, Rosemarie Fendel, Helmut Zierl	Comedy	a.k.a. In the Cave of the Lioness
In the Shadow of Power	Oliver Storz	Michael Mendl, Matthias Brandt, Dieter Pfaff, Barbara Rudnik, Jürgen Hentsch, Ulrich Mühe	History, Biography	
Ins Leben zurück	Markus Imboden	Martina Gedeck, Ulrich Thomsen, Herbert Knaup	Drama	
Instinct for Crime	Uwe Janson	Lisa Martinek, Anja Kling, Christoph Waltz	Thriller	a.k.a. Jagd auf den Flammenmann
Jennerwein	Hans-Günther Bücking	Fritz Karl, Christoph Waltz, Sabrina White	Drama	German-Austrian co-production
Jester Till	Eberhard Junkersdorf	—N/a	Animated	a.k.a. Till Eulenspiegel. German-Belgian co-production
Katz und Hund	Dieter Berner	Nicole Heesters, Martin Lüttge, Christian Kohlund, Lisa Kreuzer, Doris Kunstmann, Vitus Zeplichal	Comedy	a.k.a. Cat and Dog
Die Klasse von '99	Marco Petry	Matthias Schweighöfer, Axel Stein	Drama	
Kleine Freiheit	Yüksel Yavuz	Cagdas Bozkurt, Leroy Delmar	Drama	a.k.a. A Little Bit of Freedom
Königskinder	Isabel Kleefeld	Luise Helm, Adrian Topol, Armin Rohde	Drama	
Kroko	Sylke Enders	Franziska Jünger, Hinnerk Schönemann, Harald Schrott	Drama	
Learning to Lie	Hendrik Handloegten	Fabian Busch, Fritzi Haberlandt, Sophie Rois, Susanne Bormann	Comedy	
Leben wäre schön	Kai Wessel	Dagmar Manzel, Filip Peeters, Gabriela Maria Schmeide, Hans Korte	Drama	
Liberated Zone	Norbert Baumgarten	Michael Ojake, Florian Lukas, Johanna Klante, Annett Renneberg, Axel Prahl	Comedy	
Eine Liebe in Afrika	Xaver Schwarzenberger	Julia Stemberger, Heiner Lauterbach, Renée Soutendijk, Hannelore Elsner, Bernhard Schir, Hans-Michael Rehberg, Friedrich von Thun, Monica Bleibtreu, Mary Twala, Michelle Molatlou, Katlego Danke	Drama	
Liebe Schwester	Matti Geschonneck	Maja Maranow, Anja Kling	Drama	
A Light in Dark Places	Kaspar Heidelbach	Heino Ferch, Heike Makatsch, Jan Josef Liefers, Nadja Uhl	Drama	a.k.a. Das Wunder von Lengede
Love and Desire	Judith Kennel	Katja Flint, Natalia Wörner	Drama	
Luther	Eric Till	Joseph Fiennes, Alfred Molina, Peter Ustinov, Bruno Ganz	Biography	German-American co-production
Mädchen Nr. 1	Stefan Holtz	Max von Thun, Julia Dietze, Wanja Mues, Katharina Wackernagel, Antoine Monot Jr., Oliver Wnuk, Hanns Zischler	Comedy	
Madrid	Daphne Charizani	Kathrin Angerer, Carlos Lobo, Oliver Masucci	Drama	
Mann gesucht, Liebe gefunden	Dennis Satin	Thekla Carola Wied, Günther Maria Halmer, Saskia Vester, Helmut Zierl	Comedy	
Männer häppchenweise	Vivian Naefe	Gruschenka Stevens, Arnd Klawitter, Ulrike Kriener, Heinrich Schmieder, Hansa Czypionka	Black comedy	
Mein Name ist Bach	Dominique de Rivaz	Vadim Glowna, Jürgen Vogel, Karoline Herfurth, Anatole Taubman	Biography, Music	a.k.a. Jagged Harmonies: Bach vs. Frederick II a.k.a. My Name Is Bach. Swiss-German co-production
Mein Vater	Andreas Kleinert	Götz George, Klaus J. Behrendt	Drama	a.k.a. Coming Home
The Miracle of Bern	Sönke Wortmann	Louis Klamroth, Peter Lohmeyer	Sport	a.k.a. Das Wunder von Bern
Mit einem Rutsch ins Glück	Dietmar Klein	Anja Kruse, Heio von Stetten, Wolf Roth	Comedy	
Der Mörder ist unter uns	Markus Imboden	Christoph Waltz, Susanne Schäfer, Hermann Lause, Frank Giering	Crime	a.k.a. Der Mörder ist unter uns – Der Fall Gehring
Mörderische Elite	Florian Baxmeyer	Mina Tander, Ulrich Noethen, Niels Bruno Schmidt	Thriller	
Motown	Stefan Barth	Oli.P, Doreen Jacobi, Steffen Groth	Drama	
Mutter kommt in Fahrt	Ariane Zeller	Gila von Weitershausen, Elmar Wepper	Comedy	a.k.a. Mother Gets Going
Mysterious Friends	Uljana Havemann, Lutz Winde, Oliver Elias, Pit Rampelt	Susanna Simon, Nadeshda Brennicke, Mina Tander, Götz George, Axel Milberg, Uwe Kockisch	Anthology, Horror	a.k.a. Geheimnisvolle Freundinnen
Nach so vielen Jahren	Marek Gierszał	Walter Kreye, Philipp Moog	Drama	
Nachtangst	Michael Rowitz	Marie Zielcke, Ken Duken, Martin Glade, Bibiana Beglau	Thriller	
Nachts, wenn der Tag beginnt	Christian Görlitz	Christian Redl, Nina Petri	Thriller	
NeuFundLand	Georg Maas	Jochen Nickel, Anna Loos	Drama	
Nicht ohne deine Liebe	Sigi Rothemund	Robert Atzorn, Suzanne von Borsody, Heikko Deutschmann	Drama	
Nikos the Impaler	Andreas Schnaas	Joe Zaso, Felissa Rose	Horror	
Nitschewo	Stefan Sarazin	Ken Duken, Marie Zielcke, Daniel Olbrychski	Drama	a.k.a. Nichevo
Northern Star	Felix Randau	Julia Hummer, Nicolas Romm, Lena Stolze	Drama	
Novaks Ultimatum	Andreas Prochaska	Mark Keller, Hanns Zischler, August Zirner, Claude-Oliver Rudolph, Florentine Lahme	Thriller	
Nur Anfänger heiraten	Franziska Meyer Price	Muriel Baumeister, Benjamin Sadler	Comedy	
Operation Dance Sensation	Thilo Gosejohann	Simon Gosejohann, Thilo Gosejohann, Anke Engelke, Bela B, Jasmin Wagner	Parody, Action comedy, Music	
Play It Loud!	Benjamin Quabeck	Tom Schilling, Robert Stadlober, Jessica Schwarz, Marlon Kittel, Nadja Bobyleva, Christian Ulmen	Comedy, Music	a.k.a. Wasted Youth a.k.a. Verschwende deine Jugend
The Poet	Paul Hills	Dougray Scott, Laura Harring, Jürgen Prochnow	Thriller	British-Austrian-German co-production
Der Preis der Wahrheit	Christine Kabisch	Maren Kroymann, Walter Kreye, Ruth Maria Kubitschek	Drama	
Prince Charming	Annette Ernst	Florian Jahr, Jasmin Schwiers, Andrea Sawatzki, Herbert Knaup, Karoline Schuch, Julia Dietze	Comedy	a.k.a. Mein erster Freund, Mutter und ich
The Puppet Grave Digger	Claudia Prietzel, Peter Henning	Suzanne von Borsody, Sven Hönig, Manfred Zapatka	Thriller	a.k.a. Der Puppengräber
Push and Pull	Péter Palátsik	Sabine Timoteo, Marie-Lou Sellem, Knut Berger	Comedy	a.k.a. Irgendwas ist immer a.k.a. Wie man seinen Ex verlässt
Red and Blue	Rudolf Thome	Hannelore Elsner, Serpil Turhan, Hanns Zischler, Adriana Altaras, Karl Kranzkowski	Comedy	
Die Ritterinnen	Barbara Teufel	Jana Petersen, Ursina Lardi, Katja Danowski	Docudrama	a.k.a. Gallant Girls
Rosenstrasse	Margarethe von Trotta	Maria Schrader, Katja Riemann	Drama, War	
Schöne Lügen	Karola Hattop	Susanna Simon, Daniel Morgenroth, Niels Bruno Schmidt, Carin C. Tietze	Drama	
Die Schönste aus Bitterfeld	Matthias Tiefenbacher	Doreen Jacobi, Hannes Jaenicke, Wolke Hegenbarth, Marie-Luise Schramm, Astrid Meyerfeldt, Oliver Korittke	Comedy	
Schultze Gets the Blues	Michael Schorr	Horst Krause	Comedy, Music	
Der Seerosenteich	Johannes Fabrick	Natalia Wörner, Hannelore Elsner, Tim Bergmann, Anja Kling	Drama	
September	Max Färberböck	Nina Proll, Stefanie Stappenbeck, René Ifrah, Justus von Dohnányi, Sólveig Arnarsdóttir, Jörg Schüttauf, Anja Kling	Drama, Anthology	Screened at the 2003 Cannes Film Festival
Seven Weeks in Italy	Klaus Knoesel	Kai Wiesinger, Liane Forestieri	Comedy	a.k.a. Cappuccino zu dritt
Sex Up	Florian Gärtner	Jacob Matschenz, André Emanuel Kaminski, Joseph Bolz	Comedy	a.k.a. Love Cocktail a.k.a. Sex Up Your Life
Das siebte Foto	Jörg Lühdorff	Oliver Korittke, Lucie Zedníčková, Miroslav Táborský	Thriller	a.k.a. Das 7. Foto. German-Czech co-production
Soloalbum	Gregor Schnitzler	Matthias Schweighöfer, Nora Tschirner, Lisa Maria Potthoff, Julia Dietze	Comedy	
Der Sommer des glücklichen Narren	Gloria Behrens	Katja Woywood, Jochen Horst	Drama	
Soraya	Lodovico Gasparini	Anna Valle, Erol Sander, Mathilda May, Claude Brasseur, Michele Placido, Anja Kruse	Biography	Italian-German co-production
The Soul of a Man	Wim Wenders		Documentary, Music	American-German co-production
The Story of the Weeping Camel	Byambasuren Davaa, Luigi Falorni		Documentary	German-Mongolian co-production
Strategy of Seduction	Bettina Woernle	Julia Richter, Philippe Brenninkmeyer	Thriller	a.k.a. Der Augenblick der Begierde
Sumuru	Darrell Roodt	Alexandra Kamp, Michael Shanks	Science fiction	German-British-South African co-production
SuperTex	Jan Schütte	Stephen Mangan, Jan Decleir, Maureen Lipman, Elliot Levey, Tracy-Ann Oberman	Drama	Dutch-German co-production
Swabian Children	Jo Baier	Thomas Unterkircher, Tobias Moretti, Vadim Glowna	Drama	
Tage des Sturms	Thomas Freundner	Wotan Wilke Möhring, Franziska Petri, Peter Sodann, Thekla Carola Wied, Hans Peter Hallwachs	Drama	
Talk Straight: The World of Rural Queers	Jochen Hick		Documentary	a.k.a. Ich kenn keinen – Allein unter Heteros
Tauerngold	Rüdiger Nüchtern	Sebastian Koch, Aglaia Szyszkowitz, Fritz Karl	Drama	
Tausche Firma gegen Haushalt	Karen Müller	Axel Milberg, Christine Neubauer, Hartmut Becker, Brigitte Grothum	Comedy	a.k.a. Trade Office for Household
They've Got Knut	Stefan Krohmer	Valerie Koch, Hans-Jochen Wagner, Anneke Kim Sarnau, Alexandra Neldel	Drama	
This Very Moment	Christoph Hochhäusler	Sophie Charlotte Conrad, Leo Bruckmann, Mirosław Baka, Judith Engel	Drama	a.k.a. In This Very Moment a.k.a. Milchwald
Threesome Affair	Josh Broecker	Sophie von Kessel, Nadeshda Brennicke, Oliver Bootz	Drama	a.k.a. Affäre zu dritt
Tiger Eyes See Better	Thomas Nennstiel	Anica Dobra, Christoph Waltz, Gerd Baltus	Comedy	
Treibjagd	Ulrich Stark	Heiner Lauterbach, Udo Samel, Nina Kunzendorf, Nicole Heesters	Thriller	
Two Days of Hope	Peter Keglevic	Sebastian Koch, Hans Werner Meyer, Lisa Martinek, Matthias Habich, Christoph Waltz, André Hennicke, Hanns Zischler	Historical drama	
Urban Guerillas	Neco Çelik	İlke Üner, Felix Kasper Kalypso	Drama	
Valley of the Innocent	Branwen Okpako	Nisma Cherrat, Angelica Domröse	Drama	a.k.a. Tal der Ahnungslosen
Verliebte Diebe	Peter Patzak	Götz George, Gudrun Landgrebe	Crime comedy	
Verkauftes Land	Horst Königstein	Rudolf Kowalski, Horst Krause, Stefanie Stappenbeck	Docudrama	
We	Martin Gypkens	Oliver Bokern, Knut Berger, Rike Schmid, Lilia Lehner, Karina Plachetka, Jannek Petri, Patrick Güldenberg, Brigitte Hobmeier	Drama	
Weihnachten im September	Hajo Gies	Saskia Vester, Udo Wachtveitl, Jan-Gregor Kremp, Hannelore Hoger	Comedy	
Weihnachtsmann über Bord!	Thomas Berger	Justus von Dohnányi, Aglaia Szyszkowitz, Max Tidof	Family	
Winter Solstice	Martyn Friend	Sinéad Cusack, Peter Ustinov, Jean Simmons, Geraldine Chaplin, Jan Niklas, Brian Blessed	Drama	British-German co-production
Wolfsburg	Christian Petzold	Benno Fürmann, Nina Hoss	Drama	
Wunschkinder und andere Zufälle	Thomas Jacob	Ruth Maria Kubitschek, Susanna Simon, Marita Marschall, Tina Ruland, Gesine Cukrowski, Michael Roll	Comedy	a.k.a. Planned Children and Other Coincidences
Zuckerbrot	Hartmut Schoen	Marie Zielcke, Ivan Shvedoff, Florian Lukas, Axel Prahl	Drama	
Der zweite Frühling	Gabi Kubach	Nadja Tiller, Michael Degen, Jürgen Hentsch, Ursula Karusseit	Comedy	

== 2004 ==
Title	Director	Cast	Genre	Notes
7 Dwarves – Men Alone in the Wood	Sven Unterwaldt	Otto Waalkes, Cosma Shiva Hagen, Nina Hagen	Comedy, Fantasy	a.k.a. Seven Dwarfs
A2 Racer	Michael Keusch	Luke J. Wilkins, Alexandra Neldel, Henriette Richter-Röhl, Manuel Cortez, Kristian Kiehling, Collien Fernandes, Thomas Heinze	Action	a.k.a. Autoroute Racer
Abgefahren	Jakob Schäuffelen	Felicitas Woll, Sebastian Ströbel, Nina Tenge	Action, Sport	
Agnes and His Brothers	Oskar Roehler	Martin Weiß, Moritz Bleibtreu, Herbert Knaup, Katja Riemann, Suzan Anbeh, Tom Schilling	Drama	2 wins & 1 nomination
Alles auf Zucker!	Dani Levy	Henry Hübchen, Hannelore Elsner, Udo Samel	Comedy	a.k.a. Go for Zucker
Alone	Thomas Durchschlag	Lavinia Wilson, Maximilian Brückner, Richy Müller	Drama	
Am I Sexy?	Katinka Feistl	Marie-Luise Schramm, Birge Schade	Drama	
The Amber Amulet	Gabi Kubach	Muriel Baumeister, Michael von Au, Nadeshda Brennicke, Jürgen Hentsch, Merab Ninidze, Nadja Tiller	Drama	a.k.a. The Amber Necklace
Around the World in 80 Days	Frank Coraci	Jackie Chan, Steve Coogan, Jim Broadbent, Arnold Schwarzenegger	Adventure comedy	American-British-German-Irish co-production
The Architects	Diethard Klante	Jeanette Hain, Robert Atzorn, Hans-Michael Rehberg	Drama	a.k.a. Die Frau des Architekten
Die Ärztin	Matti Geschonneck	Anja Kling, Götz Schubert, Jule Böwe, Rudolf Kowalski	Drama	
Außer Kontrolle	Christian Görlitz	Josef Bierbichler, Jürgen Vogel, Christiane Paul, Suzanne von Borsody	Drama	
Baal	Uwe Janson	Matthias Schweighöfer, Sheri Hagen, Anna Brüggemann	Drama	
Bauernprinzessin	Susanne Zanke	Sissi Wolf, Roman Knižka, Günther Maria Halmer	Drama	Austrian-German co-production
Before the Fall	Dennis Gansel	Max Riemelt, Tom Schilling, Justus von Dohnányi	Drama, War	a.k.a. Napola. Best international film, Hamptons International Film Festival, 2004
The Blindflyers	Bernd Sahling	Ricarda Ramünke, Maria Rother	Musical	a.k.a. Die Blindgänger
Blood of the Templars	Florian Baxmeyer	Mirko Lang, Alicja Bachleda-Curuś, Harald Krassnitzer	Thriller, Fantasy	
Boo, Zino & the Snurks	Holger Tappe, Lenard Fritz Krawinkel	—N/a	Animated	a.k.a. Boo, Zino and the Snurks a.k.a. Back to Gaya
Der Boxer und die Friseuse	Hermine Huntgeburth	Ulrich Noethen, Hinnerk Schönemann, Katharina Schüttler, Peter Lohmeyer, Gaby Dohm, Tilo Prückner	Comedy	
Carola Stern's Double Life	Thomas Schadt	Maria Simon, Renate Krößner	Docudrama	a.k.a. Carola Stern – Doppelleben
Chaos Mum	Stephan Wagner	Katja Flint, Matthias Brandt, Pasquale Aleardi	Comedy	a.k.a. Wie krieg ich meine Mutter groß?
Close	Marcus Lenz	Christoph Bach, Jule Böwe, Julia Richter	Drama	
Cold Spring	Dominik Graf	Jessica Schwarz, Angela Roy, Friedrich von Thun, Mišel Matičević, Matthias Schweighöfer	Drama	a.k.a. Kalter Frühling
Cowgirl	Mark Schlichter	Alexandra Maria Lara, Wotan Wilke Möhring, Gottfried John, Ralf Richter, Peter Lohmeyer	Crime comedy	
Crazy Race 2 – Warum die Mauer wirklich fiel	Christoph Schrewe	Wolke Hegenbarth, Manuel Witting, Katy Karrenbauer, Dirk Bach, Ottfried Fischer, Martin Schneider, Otto Waalkes	Comedy	
C(r)ook	Pepe Danquart	Henry Hübchen, Moritz Bleibtreu, Corinna Harfouch, Nadeshda Brennicke	Crime comedy	a.k.a. Basta – Rotwein oder Totsein. German-Austrian co-production
Curse This House	Marco Serafini	Eva Habermann, Eva Pflug, René Steinke, Jürgen Hentsch	Drama	a.k.a. Lockruf der Vergangenheit
Daniel – Der Zauberer	Ulli Lommel	Daniel Küblböck, Ulli Lommel, Peter Schamoni, Katja Rupé, Roger Fritz	Drama, Music	a.k.a. Daniel the Wizard
Dark Kingdom: The Dragon King	Uli Edel	Benno Fürmann, Kristanna Loken, Max von Sydow, Julian Sands, Robert Pattinson	Fantasy	a.k.a. Ring of the Nibelungs. a.k.a. Curse of the Ring. a.k.a. Sword of Xanten. German-British-Italian co-production
Deadly Diversion	Curt Faudon	Ken Duken, Sebastian Koch, Eva Hassmann	Thriller	a.k.a. Tödlicher Umweg
Delphinsommer	Jobst Oetzmann	Anna Maria Mühe, Birge Schade, Samuel Finzi, Tino Mewes	Drama	
Don't Look for Me	Tilman Zens	Lea Mornar, Stipe Erceg, Udo Schenk	Crime	a.k.a. Such mich nicht
Dornröschens leiser Tod	Marcus O. Rosenmüller	Nadja Auermann	Mystery	
Downfall	Oliver Hirschbiegel	Bruno Ganz, Alexandra Maria Lara, Ulrich Matthes, Corinna Harfouch, Juliane Köhler	Drama, War	a.k.a. Der Untergang. Downfall of Adolf Hitler / Nominated for Oscar
Drechslers zweite Chance	Jobst Oetzmann	Dietmar Bär, Joachim Król, Sofie Lassen-Kahlke, Stephan Kampwirth, Birge Schade	Comedy	
Edelweiss Pirates	Niko von Glasow	Ivan Stebunov, Bela B, Anna Thalbach	War drama	
The Edukators	Hans Weingartner	Julia Jentsch, Daniel Brühl, Stipe Erceg, Burghart Klaußner	Comedy drama, Crime	a.k.a. Die fetten Jahre sind vorbei. Golden Palm Award nomination
Egoshooter	Oliver Schwabe, Christian Becker	Tom Schilling, Lilia Lehner, Nikki Sudden	Drama	
Eine unter Tausend	Bodo Fürneisen	Alexandra Finder, Tom Beck	Music, Drama	
En Garde	Ayşe Polat	Maria Kwiatkowsky, Pinar Erincin	Drama	Best Actress Award (Locarno International Film Festival)
En Route	Jan Krüger	Florian Panzner, Anabelle Lachatte, Martin Kiefer	Drama	a.k.a. Unterwegs. Tiger Award: Rotterdam Film Festival
Engelchen flieg	Adolf Winkelmann	Uwe Ochsenknecht, Corinna Beilharz	Drama	
Erbin mit Herz	Holger Barthel	Nina Proll, Pierre Besson, Gaby Dohm, Freddy Quinn	Drama	
Experiment Bootcamp	Andreas Linke	Matthias Koeberlin, Natalia Wörner, Aaron Hildebrand, Erhan Emre, Tobias Oertel	Drama	
Das falsche Opfer	Ulrich Stark	Jeanette Hain, Thomas Sarbacher, Mathias Herrmann	Thriller	
Familie auf Bestellung	Urs Egger	Heike Makatsch, Patrick Rapold	Comedy	German-Austrian co-production
Das Familiengeheimnis	Heidi Kranz	Hardy Krüger Jr., Dennenesch Zoudé, Christiane Hörbiger	Drama	
Farland	Michael Klier	Laura Tonke, Richy Müller, Daniel Brühl	Drama	
Fateful Treasure	Michael Karen	Marie Zielcke, Antonio Wannek	Thriller	a.k.a. Verfluchte Beute
Feuer in der Nacht	Kai Wessel	August Diehl, Martina Gedeck, Christian Berkel, Alice Dwyer	Thriller	
Fiesta der Leidenschaft	Peter Welz	Katja Studt, Max Tidof, Hannelore Hoger	Thriller	
First Love	Claudia Prietzel, Peter Henning	Cordelia Wege, Tino Mewes, Christian Berkel, Leslie Malton	Drama	
Follow the Feather	Nuray Şahin	Pegah Ferydoni	Drama	
Für immer im Herzen	Miguel Alexandre	Natalia Wörner, Julia Jäger, Hanns Zischler, Hannes Jaenicke, Patrick Baehr	Drama	
Für immer und jetzt	Sylvia Hoffman	Katja Flint, Uwe Ochsenknecht, Michael Mendl	Drama	
Geerbtes Glück	Heidi Kranz	Jennifer Nitsch, Francis Fulton-Smith, Ursela Monn, Juraj Kukura, Michael Mendl	Drama	
Giacomo Casanova	Richard Blank	Robert Hunger-Bühler, Martina Gedeck, Mavie Hörbiger, Lambert Hamel	Biography	
Ein glücklicher Tag	Paul Hengge	Sylvester Groth, Eva Herzig	Drama	a.k.a. A Happy Day
Ein Goldfisch unter Haien	Marc-Andreas Bochert	Cordelia Wege, Alexander Beyer, Burghart Klaußner, Sanne Schnapp	Crime comedy	
Grüße aus Kaschmir	Miguel Alexandre	René Ifrah, Bernadette Heerwagen	Drama	
Guys and Balls	Sherry Hormann	Maximilian Brückner, David Rott, Lisa Maria Potthoff	Sport, Comedy	a.k.a. Männer wie wir
Head-On	Fatih Akin	Sibel Kekilli, Birol Ünel	Drama	a.k.a. Gegen die Wand
Hell on Wheels	Pepe Danquart		Documentary, Sport	a.k.a. Höllentour
Home Truths	Carsten Fiebeler	Catherine Flemming, Michael Kind, Uwe Kockisch, Nils Nelleßen	Thriller	a.k.a. Die Datsche
Hunger for Life	Markus Imboden	Martina Gedeck, Kai Wiesinger, Ulrich Mühe	Biography	
Ich werde immer bei euch sein	Markus Fischer	Katharina Böhm, Axel Milberg, Francis Fulton-Smith	Mystery	
Im Tal des Schweigens	Peter Sämann	Christine Neubauer, Sascha Hehn, Timothy Peach, Fred Stillkrauth	Drama	a.k.a. In the Valley of Silence
Italiener und andere Süßigkeiten	Ute Wieland	Stefanie Stappenbeck, Benjamin Sadler	Comedy	
Jargo	Maria Solrun	Constantin von Jascheroff, Oktay Özdemir, Nora Waldstätten, Josefine Preuß, Udo Kier	Drama	
Judith Kemp	Helmut Metzger	Jennifer Nitsch, Gesine Cukrowski	Drama	
Käthchens Traum	Jürgen Flimm	Tobias Moretti, Teresa Weißbach, Julia Stemberger	Drama	
Kebab Connection	Anno Saul	Denis Moschitto, Nora Tschirner	Comedy	German-Turkish co-production
Die Kette	Bettina Blümner	Axel Prahl	Drama	
King of Thieves	Ivan Fíla	Jakov Kultiasov, Lazar Ristovski, Katharina Thalbach, Oktay Özdemir, Paulus Manker	Drama	
Kiss Me, Chancellor!	Ulrich Stark	Robert Atzorn, Andrea Sawatzki, Hanns Zischler, Florentine Lahme	Comedy	
Klassentreffen	Marc Hertel	Frank Giering, Lisa Martinek, Devid Striesow, Johann von Bülow, Barbara Philipp	Drama	
Kleine Schwester	Sabine Derflinger	Maria Simon, Esther Zimmering, Benno Fürmann, Uwe Kockisch, Michael Gwisdek	Crime	
Kleinruppin Forever	Carsten Fiebeler	Tobias Schenke, Anna Brüggemann, Michael Gwisdek	Comedy	
Das Kommando	Thomas Bohn	Jens Atzorn, Robert Atzorn, Iris Berben	War	
Die Konferenz	Niki Stein	Senta Berger, Ulrike Kriener, Günther Maria Halmer, Wotan Wilke Möhring, Sophie von Kessel, Jan-Gregor Kremp, Nina Petri, Rudolf Kowalski, Peter Fitz	Drama	
Das Konto	Markus Imboden	Heino Ferch, Julia Jäger, Josef Bierbichler, Franziska Petri, Michael Gwisdek	Thriller	
Ein krasser Deal	Christina Fürneisen, Daniel Texter	Sandra Borgmann, Tom Beck, Josef Heynert, Oliver Korittke	Crime comedy	a.k.a. Traumtänzer
Laura's Star	Piet De Rycker, Thilo Rothkirch	—N/a	Animated	
Lemony Snicket's A Series of Unfortunate Events	Brad Silberling	Jim Carrey, Liam Aiken, Emily Browning, Timothy Spall, Catherine O'Hara, Billy Connolly, Cedric the Entertainer, Luis Guzmán, Jennifer Coolidge, Meryl Streep	Adventure black comedy	American-German co-production
Liebe auf Bewährung	Bernd Böhlich	Helmut Griem, Thekla Carola Wied, Harry Rowohlt	Drama	a.k.a. Love on Probation
Liebe ist die beste Medizin	Hannu Salonen	Dominic Raacke, Sandra Speichert, Monica Bleibtreu, Rüdiger Vogler, Charles Brauer	Comedy	a.k.a. Love Is the Best Medicine
Lotti auf der Flucht	Peter Weissflog	Heidelinde Weis, Charles Brauer	Comedy	
Love Has the Last Word	Ariane Zeller	Günther Maria Halmer, Sabine Vitua, Ruth Maria Kubitschek, Christian Kohlund	Comedy	
Love in Thoughts	Achim von Borries	Daniel Brühl, August Diehl, Anna Maria Mühe	Drama	a.k.a. Was nützt die Liebe in Gedanken
Mädchen, Mädchen 2 – Loft oder Liebe	Peter Gersina	Diana Amft, Karoline Herfurth, Jasmin Gerat	Comedy	a.k.a. Girls on Top 2
Marseille	Angela Schanelec	Maren Eggert, Alexis Loret, Devid Striesow	Drama	Screened at the 2004 Cannes Film Festival
Mein Weg zu dir heißt Liebe	Thomas Berger	Kostja Ullmann, Lisa Martinek	Drama	
Mogelpackung Mann	Udo Witte	Christoph M. Ohrt, Anica Dobra	Comedy	
Der Mond im See	Heidi Kranz	Marion Mitterhammer, Stefan Gubser, Anja Kruse	Drama	
Mord am Meer	Matti Geschonneck	Heino Ferch, Nadja Uhl, Birge Schade, Manfred Zapatka	Thriller	
Mr. & Mrs. Right	Torsten C. Fischer	Maria Furtwängler, Matthias Brandt, Udo Wachtveitl, Bernhard Schir, Marie-Lou Sellem	Comedy	a.k.a. Mr. and Mrs. Right
Murderous Search	Johannes Grieser	Ann-Kathrin Kramer, Christoph Waltz, Jörg Schüttauf, Jan Skopeček	Thriller	
Der Mustervater – Allein unter Kindern	Dagmar Hirtz	Walter Sittler, Claudia Michelsen	Comedy	
Muxmäuschenstill	Marcus Mittermeier	Jan Henrik Stahlberg	Comedy	a.k.a. Quiet as a Mouse
My Brother Is a Dog	Peter Timm	Maria Ehrich, Irm Hermann, Christine Neubauer	Family	
Night of the Living Dorks	Mathias Dinter	Tino Mewes, Manuel Cortez, Thomas Schmieder, Collien Fernandes	Teen film, Comedy	a.k.a. Revenge of the Teenage Zombies a.k.a. Die Nacht der lebenden Loser
Nightsongs	Romuald Karmakar	Frank Giering, Anne Ratte-Polle, Marthe Keller	Drama	a.k.a. Die Nacht singt ihre Lieder
The Ninth Day	Volker Schlöndorff	Ulrich Matthes, August Diehl	Drama, War	a.k.a. The 9th Day
The Odd Couple	Doris Dörrie	Heiner Lauterbach, Uwe Ochsenknecht	Comedy	a.k.a. Ein seltsames Paar
Off Beat	Hendrik Hölzemann	Matthias Schweighöfer, Jessica Schwarz, Florian Lukas, Jan-Gregor Kremp, Bibiana Beglau, Ulrich Noethen, Rosel Zech	Drama	a.k.a. Kammerflimmern
Olga's Summer	Nina Grosse	Clémence Poésy, Bruno Todeschini	Drama	French-German co-production. Entered into the 26th Moscow International Film Festival
The Other Woman	Margarethe von Trotta	Barbara Sukowa, Barbara Auer, Stefan Kurt	Drama	
Paradies in den Bergen	Hartmut Griesmayr	Ursula Buschhorn, Bernhard Schir, Michael Lesch, Herbert Fux	Drama	
A Pass from the Back	Gil Mehmert	Arndt Schwering-Sohnrey, Eckhard Preuß, Christoph Maria Herbst	Comedy	a.k.a. Aus der Tiefe des Raumes
Peas at 5:30	Lars Büchel	Hilmir Snær Guðnason, Fritzi Haberlandt	Drama	
PiperMint	Nicole-Nadine Deppé	Luisa-Soi Kaiser, Sami Frey, Meret Becker, Marek Harloff	Drama	German-Luxembourgish co-production
Platinum	Martin Enlen	Tim Bergmann, Nathalie Boltt, Hans Werner Meyer	Adventure	German-South African co-production
Post Impact	Christoph Schrewe	Dean Cain, Bettina Zimmermann, Joanna Taylor, Hanns Zischler	Disaster	American-German co-production
Problemzone Schwiegereltern	Christine Hartmann	Doreen Jacobi, Michael Gwisdek, Katrin Sass, Joram Voelklein, Doreen Dietel	Comedy	
Propaganda	Horst Königstein	Dietrich Mattausch	Thriller	
Die Quittung	Niki Stein	Jan-Gregor Kremp, Heikko Deutschmann, Anke Sevenich, Paula Paul, Katharina Thalbach	Thriller	
Resident Evil: Apocalypse	Alexander Witt	Milla Jovovich, Thomas Kretschmann	Action, Horror	German-Canadian-French-British-American co-production
Rhythm Is It!	Thomas Grube, Enrique Sánchez Lansch		Documentary, Music	
Rock Crystal	Joseph Vilsmaier	Dana Vávrová, Daniel Morgenroth	Drama	a.k.a. Iceberg
Room Service	Andreas Senn	Lisa Martinek, Mišel Matičević, Charly Hübner, Christoph Maria Herbst	Comedy	a.k.a. Das Zimmermädchen und der Millionär
The Rose Gardener	Erhard Riedlsperger	Hannelore Elsner, Ruth Maria Kubitschek, Frank Giering, Vadim Glowna, Axel Milberg	Drama, War	a.k.a. The Rose Grower a.k.a. Die Rosenzüchterin
Die Rückkehr des Tanzlehrers	Urs Egger	Tobias Moretti, Veronica Ferres, Maximilian Schell	Thriller	a.k.a. The Return of the Dancing Master. German-Austrian co-production
Die Rückkehr des Vaters	Jörg Grünler	Vadim Glowna, Uwe Bohm, Wotan Wilke Möhring, Sophie von Kessel, Deborah Kaufmann, Hans Peter Hallwachs	Drama	Remake of Una storia qualunque (2000)
Saniyes Lust	Verena S. Freytag	İdil Üner	Drama	
Schöne Männer hat man nie für sich allein	Hansjörg Thurn	Elena Uhlig, Pasquale Aleardi, Jochen Horst, Nina Petri, Catherine Flemming	Comedy	
Schöne Witwen küssen besser	Carlo Rola	Iris Berben, Sophie Schütt, Andrea Sawatzki, Peter Sattmann, Gregor Törzs, Christoph Waltz	Crime comedy	
The School Trip	Lars Montag	Josefine Preuß, Marlon Kittel, Kostja Ullmann, Jennifer Ulrich, Claudia Fritzsche	Comedy	a.k.a. Klassenfahrt – Geknutscht wird immer
Eine schräge Familie	Jan Ruzicka	Peter Sattmann, Saskia Vester	Comedy	a.k.a. A Strange Kind of Family. (Shot in 1999)
Sehnsucht	Ciro Cappellari	Mišel Matičević, Katharina Schüttler, Hans-Michael Rehberg	Drama	
Sex & more	Peter Gersina	Mina Tander, Stefanie Stappenbeck, Simone Hanselmann, Mimi Fiedler	Comedy	a.k.a. Sex and More
Shadows of Time	Florian Gallenberger	Prashant Narayanan, Tannishtha Chatterjee	Drama	Film in Bengali language
Shark Attack in the Mediterranean	Jorgo Papavassiliou	Ralf Moeller, Katy Karrenbauer, Ottfried Fischer	Horror	a.k.a. Megalodon: Killer From the Deep a.k.a. Hai-Alarm auf Mallorca
So fühlt sich Liebe an	Peter Gersina	Hannes Jaenicke, Maria Furtwängler, Jan-Gregor Kremp	Drama	
SommerHundeSöhne	Cyril Tuschi	Fabian Busch, Stipe Erceg	Comedy	
Soundless	Mennan Yapo	Joachim Król, Nadja Uhl	Thriller	a.k.a. Lautlos
Stärker als der Tod	Nikolaus Leytner	Veronica Ferres, August Zirner	Crime drama	
Status Yo!	Till Hastreiter	Jan Kage, Sera Finale	Musical	
Stauffenberg	Jo Baier	Sebastian Koch, Ulrich Tukur, Udo Schenk, Axel Milberg, Remo Girone, Hardy Krüger Jr., Harald Krassnitzer, Nina Kunzendorf, Stefania Rocca, Olli Dittrich	Biography, War	a.k.a. Operation Valkyrie
Der Stich des Skorpion	Stephan Wagner	Jörg Schüttauf, Martina Gedeck, Matthias Brandt, Hannes Jaenicke	Thriller	
Stratosphere Girl	Matthias X. Oberg	Chloé Winkel, Jon Yang, Togo Igawa, Burt Kwouk	Drama	
Stripped	Sigi Rothemund	Suzanne von Borsody, Max Tidof	Thriller	a.k.a. The Cave a.k.a. Ein einsames Haus am See
Die Stunde der Offiziere	Hans-Erich Viet	Harald Schrott	Docudrama, War	
Summer Storm	Marco Kreuzpaintner	Robert Stadlober, Kostja Ullmann, Alicja Bachleda-Curuś, Miriam Morgenstern	Drama	
Süperseks	Torsten Wacker	Denis Moschitto, Marie Zielcke, Hilmi Sözer, Peter Lohmeyer	Comedy	
Tears of Kali	Andreas Marschall	Mathieu Carrière, Peter Martell	Anthology, Horror	
The Threepenny Opera	Ulrich Waller	Ulrich Tukur, Christian Redl, Eva Mattes, Stefanie Stappenbeck	Musical	
Traffic Affairs	Nicolai Albrecht	Anna Brüggemann, Ulrich Matthes	Drama	a.k.a. Mitfahrer
Der Traum vom Süden	Christine Kabisch	Elmar Wepper, Gila von Weitershausen, Katharina Schubert, Dietrich Hollinderbäumer, Monika Peitsch	Comedy	
Traumschiff Surprise – Periode 1	Michael Herbig	Michael Herbig, Til Schweiger, Christian Tramitz, Rick Kavanian, Anja Kling	Parody, Science fiction comedy	a.k.a. Dreamship Surprise: Period 1
Unpleasant Encounter in the Moonlight	Dror Zahavi	Uwe Bohm, Sandra S. Leonhard	Comedy, Fantasy	a.k.a. Eine verflixte Begegnung im Mondschein
Der Vater meines Sohnes	Dagmar Damek	Désirée Nosbusch, Gedeon Burkhard, Michael Degen, Dana Vávrová, Ralph Herforth	Drama	a.k.a. The Father of My Son
Vater werden ist nicht schwer	René Heisig	August Zirner, Heinz Baumann	Comedy	
Venussian Tabutasco	Daryush Shokof	Narges Rashidi, Daryush Shokof	Comedy	
Verführung in 6 Gängen	Ariane Zeller	Heio von Stetten, Tina Ruland, Rüdiger Vogler, Irm Hermann	Comedy	a.k.a. Verführung in sechs Gängen a.k.a. Seduction in Six Courses
Veronique: Pride and Passion	Karl Kases	Bettina Zimmermann, Stefan Jürgens, Mickey Hardt, Dietmar Schönherr, Sonja Kirchberger, Leslie Malton, Miroslav Nemec	Adventure	a.k.a. Das unbezähmbare Herz
Das verräterische Collier	Oliver Dommenget	Fanny Stavjanik, Doris Schretzmayer, Marcus Bluhm, Susanne Michel, Hark Bohm, Dietrich Hollinderbäumer	Thriller	
Die Versuchung	Bodo Fürneisen	Thekla Carola Wied, Walter Kreye, Ludwig Blochberger, Mira Bartuschek	Drama	a.k.a. The Temptation
Vinzent	Ayassi	Detlef Bothe	Mystery	
Der Wixxer	Tobi Baumann	Oliver Kalkofe, Bastian Pastewka, Thomas Fritsch, Wolfgang Völz, Christoph Maria Herbst	Parody, Crime comedy	a.k.a. The Trixxer
Woman Driving, Man Sleeping	Rudolf Thome	Hannelore Elsner, Karl Kranzkowski, Eva Herzig, Hanns Zischler	Drama	
Yugotrip	Nadya Derado	Stipe Erceg, Lena Lauzemis	Drama	
Zwei Männer und ein Baby	Ilse Hofmann	Heiner Lauterbach, Michael Roll, Sandra Speichert, Arthur Brauss	Comedy	a.k.a. 2 Männer und ein Baby a.k.a. Two Men and a Baby
Eine zweimalige Frau	Karen Müller	Christine Neubauer, Michael Fitz, Doris Kunstmann	Comedy	a.k.a. A Two-Time Woman
Ein Zwilling ist nicht genug	Brigitte Müller	Ann-Kathrin Kramer, Bernhard Schir, Tyron Ricketts, René Hofschneider	Comedy	

== 2005 ==
Title	Director	Cast	Genre	Notes
2 or 3 Things I Know About Him	Malte Ludin	Hanns Ludin	Documentary	
12 Tangos	Arne Birkenstock		Documentary, Music	
About a Girl	Catharina Deus	Katharina Wackernagel	Drama	a.k.a. Die Boxerin
About the Looking for and the Finding of Love	Helmut Dietl	Alexandra Maria Lara, Moritz Bleibtreu, Harald Schmidt, Anke Engelke, Christoph Maria Herbst, Heino Ferch	Comedy, Fantasy	
The Airlift	Dror Zahavi	Ulrich Tukur, Heino Ferch, Bettina Zimmermann, Ulrich Noethen	Historical drama	a.k.a. Die Luftbrücke – Nur der Himmel war frei
Almost Heaven	Ed Herzog	Heike Makatsch, Nikki Amuka-Bird, Carl Bradshaw, Wotan Wilke Möhring	Comedy	
Alone in the Dark	Uwe Boll	Christian Slater, Tara Reid, Stephen Dorff	Horror	German-Canadian-American co-production
Andersrum	Mark Keller, Heiner Lauterbach	Heiner Lauterbach, Mark Keller, Sandra Speichert, Heinz Hoenig, Rolf Zacher	Comedy	
Antibodies	Christian Alvart	Wotan Wilke Möhring, André Hennicke, Norman Reedus, Heinz Hoenig, Nina Proll, Ulrike Krumbiegel	Thriller	
Apollonia	Bernd Fischerauer	Julia Heinze, Götz Otto, Konstantin Wecker	Drama	
Arnie's World	Isabel Kleefeld	Caroline Peters, Matthias Brandt, Jörg Schüttauf, Bruno Schubert	Crime	
Auf den Spuren der Vergangenheit	Sharon von Wietersheim	Ursula Buschhorn, Ralf Bauer, Günther Schramm	Drama	
Baby You're Mine	Annette Ernst	Katharina Wackernagel, Benjamin Sadler	Comedy	
Barefoot	Til Schweiger	Til Schweiger, Johanna Wokalek, Nadja Tiller, Michael Mendl, Steffen Wink, Alexandra Neldel, Axel Stein, Stefanie Stappenbeck, Janine Kunze	Comedy	
Beautiful Women	Sathyan Ramesh	Floriane Daniel, Julia Jäger, Caroline Peters, Clelia Sarto, Ulrike C. Tscharre	Comedy	
Beetles for Breakfast	Zoltan Spirandelli	Nina Kronjäger, Jörg Schüttauf	Comedy	a.k.a. Schlafsack für zwei
Berlin Stories	Miriam Dehne, Esther Gronenborn, Irene von Alberti	Inga Busch, David Scheller, Richard Kropf, Julia Hummer	Anthology, Drama	a.k.a. Stadt als Beute
Der Bernsteinfischer	Olaf Kreinsen	Heiner Lauterbach, Sonsee Neu	Drama	
The Best Year of My Life	Olaf Kreinsen	Christine Neubauer, Huub Stapel, Sandra Borgmann	Drama	
Blindes Vertrauen	Mark Schlichter	Heikko Deutschmann, Esther Zimmering, Nadeshda Brennicke, Wotan Wilke Möhring	Drama	
BloodRayne	Uwe Boll	Kristanna Loken, Ben Kingsley, Michael Madsen, Billy Zane, Udo Kier, Meat Loaf, Michelle Rodriguez	Fantasy	German-American co-production
The Bodyguard	Markus Imboden	Ulrike Folkerts, Barbara Rudnik	Drama	a.k.a. Die Leibwächterin
Brautpaar auf Probe	Ben Verbong	Tyron Ricketts, Eva Hassmann	Comedy	
Brief eines Unbekannten	Arend Agthe	Anke Sevenich, Harald Krassnitzer	Comedy	
The Call of the Toad	Robert Gliński	Krystyna Janda, Matthias Habich	Drama	a.k.a. Unkenrufe. German-Polish co-production
The Canterville Ghost	Isabel Kleefeld	Klaus J. Behrendt, Saskia Vester, Armin Rohde	Family	a.k.a. Ghost of Canterville
Cash on Delivery	René Heinersdorff	Jacques Breuer, Dorkas Kiefer, Jochen Busse, Elke Sommer, Hugo Egon Balder, Janine Kunze	Comedy	a.k.a. Ewig rauschen die Gelder
The Cave of the Yellow Dog	Byambasuren Davaa	Batchuluuny Nansal	Family	Mongolian-German co-production
The Challenge	Johannes Jaeger	Mathis Landwehr	Science fiction, Action	a.k.a. Kampfansage – Der letzte Schüler
The Chocolate Queen	Matthias Kopp	Christine Neubauer, Hardy Krüger Jr., Ingolf Lück	Comedy	
A Christmoose Carol	Ben Verbong	Mario Adorf, Raban Bieling, Anja Kling	Family	a.k.a. Es ist ein Elch entsprungen
The Clown: Payday	Sebastian Vigg	Sven Martinek, Eva Habermann, Götz Otto, Xenia Seeberg	Action	
Combat 16	Mirko Borscht	Florian Bartholomäi, Ludwig Trepte	Drama	
Crazy Partners	Dominic Müller	Steffen Groth, Mareike Fell	Action	
Crossing the Bridge: The Sound of Istanbul	Fatih Akin		Documentary, Music	German-Turkish co-production
Danger: Mother-in-Law!	Zoltan Spirandelli	Katharina Schüttler, Adele Neuhauser, Arne Lenk	Comedy	a.k.a. Vorsicht Schwiegermutter!
The Day Bobby Ewing Died	Lars Jessen	Franz Dinda, Gabriela Maria Schmeide, Peter Lohmeyer, Nina Petri, Richy Müller	Comedy	
Dem Himmel sei Dank	Dagmar Damek	Marie-Luise Marjan, Ulrich Pleitgen, Hans Peter Hallwachs, Bettina Kupfer, Ralph Herforth	Drama	
Die Diebin und der General	Miguel Alexandre	Katja Riemann, Jürgen Hentsch, Heio von Stetten	Comedy	a.k.a. Die Diebin & Der General
Drei teuflisch starke Frauen	Ariane Zeller	Gila von Weitershausen, Ruth Maria Kubitschek, Gaby Dohm	Comedy	a.k.a. 3 teuflisch starke Frauen
Durch Liebe erlöst – Das Geheimnis des Roten Hauses	Jörg Grünler	Pauline Knof, Tim Bergmann, Natalia Wörner	Drama	
Einmal so wie ich will	Vivian Naefe	Senta Berger, Götz George, Peter Simonischek, Jeanette Hain, Filip Peeters, Sisanda Henna, Celeste Matthews Wannenburgh	Drama	
Emilia	Henrik Pfeifer	Ivonne Schönherr	Drama	a.k.a. Emilia Galotti. German-Swiss co-production
Endless Horizon	Thomas Jauch	Franziska Petri, Hannes Jaenicke, Günther Maria Halmer, Sheri Hagen	Drama	
Enigma: An Unacknowledged Love	Volker Schlöndorff	Mario Adorf, Justus von Dohnányi	Drama	a.k.a. Enigma Variations
The Fisherman and His Wife	Doris Dörrie	Alexandra Maria Lara, Christian Ulmen	Comedy	
Flightplan	Robert Schwentke	Jodie Foster	Thriller	American-German co-production
Fratricide	Yılmaz Arslan	Azad Çelik, Nurretin Çelik, Bulent Buyukasik	Drama	German-French co-production
Fremde Haut	Angelina Maccarone	Jasmin Tabatabai, Anneke Kim Sarnau	Drama	a.k.a. Unveiled
Full Throttle	Lars Montag	Jan Sosniok, Valerie Niehaus, Harald Krassnitzer	Action	a.k.a. Drive or Die a.k.a. Vollgas – Gebremst wird später
Gas Station Bride	Josh Broecker	Floriane Daniel, René Steinke	Comedy	
Das geheime Leben meiner Freundin	Walter Weber	Mariele Millowitsch, Jürgen Vogel	Crime comedy	a.k.a. The Sundial
Girl Overboard	Hansjörg Thurn	Isabell Gerschke, Martina Hill, Michael Härle, Christoph Maria Herbst	Comedy	
Gisela	Isabelle Stever	Anne Weinknecht, Carlo Ljubek, Stefan Rudolf, Esther Zimmering	Drama	
Ghosts	Christian Petzold	Julia Hummer, Sabine Timoteo, Marianne Basler	Drama	a.k.a. Gespenster
Der Grenzer und das Mädchen	Hartmut Schoen	Axel Prahl, Margarita Breitkreiz	Drama	German-Polish co-production
Grenzverkehr	Stefan Betz	Henriette Richter-Röhl, Andreas Buntscheck, Ferdinand Schmidt-Modrow, Joseph M'Barek, Dana Vávrová, Götz Otto, Oliver Korittke	Comedy	
Hallesche Kometen	Susanne Irina Zacharias	Hanno Koffler, Marie Rönnebeck, Peter Kurth, Max Riemelt	Drama	
Happiness on the Staircase	Thomas Jacob	Christine Neubauer, Michael Roll, Dietmar Schönherr	Comedy	a.k.a. Glück auf halber Treppe
Hengstparade	Michael Kreindl	Christiane Hörbiger, Michael Mendl, Eva Herzig, Michael Roll	Crime	a.k.a. Stallion Parade
Herzlichen Glückwunsch	Berno Kürten	Gudrun Landgrebe, Walter Kreye, Michael Mendl, Irm Hermann	Comedy	a.k.a. Happy Birthday
Hexenküsse	Johannes Fabrick	Julia Stemberger, Christian Berkel	Comedy, Fantasy	
Hitler Cantata	Jutta Brückner	Hilmar Thate, Lena Lauzemis	Drama	
House of Harmony	Marco Serafini	Maggie Q, Fann Wong, Philippe Brenninkmeyer, Daniel Morgenroth, Monika Peitsch	Drama	a.k.a. Perfect Harmony. German-Singaporean co-production
Hunt for Justice	Charles Binamé	Wendy Crewson, William Hurt, John Corbett, Heino Ferch, Stipe Erceg, Jacques Godin	Drama	a.k.a. Jagd nach Gerechtigkeit. Canadian-German co-production
I Am Guilty	Christoph Hochhäusler	Constantin von Jascheroff	Drama	a.k.a. Low Profile a.k.a. Falscher Bekenner. Screened at the 2005 Cannes Film Festival
In einem anderen Leben	Manuel Siebenmann	Sabrina White, Max von Thun, Hans-Michael Rehberg, Irm Hermann	War	
In Liebe eine Eins	Hartmut Griesmayr	Anna Loos, Heiner Lauterbach, Rosel Zech	Drama	
In Sachen Kaminski	Stephan Wagner	Juliane Köhler, Matthias Brandt, Anneke Kim Sarnau, Lena Stolze, Aglaia Szyszkowitz, Heikko Deutschmann, Amber Bongard	Drama	
Into Great Silence	Philip Gröning		Documentary	German-French-Swiss co-production
Intrigue and Love	Leander Haußmann	Götz George, August Diehl, Paula Kalenberg, Katja Flint, Katharina Thalbach, Detlev Buck	Drama	a.k.a. Kabale und Liebe
Irren ist sexy	Manfred Stelzer	Anja Kling, Gerit Kling, Oliver Korittke	Comedy	
Joyeux Noël	Christian Carion	Benno Fürmann, Guillaume Canet, Diane Kruger, Gary Lewis, Alex Ferns, Dany Boon, Daniel Brühl	War drama	Co-produced with France & UK
Just an Ordinary Jew	Oliver Hirschbiegel	Ben Becker	Drama	a.k.a. A Very Ordinary Jew
Katze im Sack	Florian Schwarz	Christoph Bach, Jule Böwe, Walter Kreye	Drama	a.k.a. Let the Cat Out of the Bag
Koala in the Kitchen	Uwe Janson	Jan Josef Liefers, Anna Loos, Günther Maria Halmer	Comedy, Family	a.k.a. Ein Koala-Bär allein zu Haus
Kõrini!	Peeter Simm	Heio von Stetten, Maarja Jakobson, Rasmus Kaljujärv	Comedy	a.k.a. Fed Up!. German-Estonian co-production
Ein Kuckuckskind der Liebe	Martin Enlen	Lisa Martinek, Fritz Karl, Tim Bergmann, Antje Schmidt	Drama	
La Dolce Rita	Axel de Roche	Simone Thomalla, Michael Roll, Steffen Wink	Comedy	
Let's Break	Esther Gronenborn	Ali Biryar, Ahmedin Camdzic, Sabine Krause	Drama, Music	a.k.a. Adil geht
Die letzte Schlacht	Hans-Christoph Blumenberg	Anna Maria Mühe, Ludwig Blochberger, Florian Lukas, Tom Schilling, Katharina Wackernagel, Jan-Gregor Kremp, Fabian Busch, Jörg Schüttauf, Christian Redl, Tim Bergmann	War, Docudrama	
Letztes Kapitel	Marcus O. Rosenmüller	Nadja Auermann, Benjamin Sadler, Nicki von Tempelhoff	Drama	a.k.a. Ein bißchen Föhn, und du bist tot
Liebe Amelie	Maris Pfeiffer	Maria Kwiatkowsky, Gabriela Maria Schmeide, Oliver Stokowski	Drama	
Liebe hat Vorfahrt	Dietmar Klein	Günther Maria Halmer, Suzanne von Borsody, Wolf Roth, Florian David Fitz, Lisa Maria Potthoff	Comedy	
Liebe nach dem Tod	Matti Geschonneck	Maja Maranow, August Zirner	Drama	
Liebeskind	Jeanette Wagner	Anna Fischer, Lutz Blochberger	Drama	
The Little Polar Bear 2: The Mysterious Island	Piet De Rycker, Thilo Rothkirch	—N/a	Animated	
Love Game	Britta Sauer	Maggie Peren, Florian Stetter	Drama	
Make Love, Not Fat	Christoph Schrewe	Theresa Scholze, Jochen Schropp, Dirk Bach	Comedy	
Mama und der Millionär	Gloria Behrens	Johanna Christine Gehlen, Ralf Bauer, Dietrich Hollinderbäumer, Jacques Breuer, Ingo Naujoks, Daniel Friedrich	Comedy	
The Man Women Want	Christoph Schrewe	Marco Girnth, Liane Forestieri, Johann von Bülow, Julia Thurnau	Comedy	
Die Mandantin	Marcus O. Rosenmüller	Barbara Rudnik, Jasmin Gerat, August Zirner	Thriller	
Margarete Steiff	Xaver Schwarzenberger	Heike Makatsch	Biography	
Marias's Last Journey	Rainer Kaufmann	Monica Bleibtreu, Nina Kunzendorf, Günther Maria Halmer	Drama	
Mathilde liebt	Wolfram Paulus	Christiane Hörbiger, Michael Mendl, Elmar Wepper	Drama	
Measures to Better the World	Jörn Hintzer, Jakob Hüfner	Max Mauff, Samuel Finzi	Anthology, Comedy	
Mein Mann und seine Mütter	Franziska Meyer Price	Tanja Wedhorn, Oliver Bootz, Gudrun Landgrebe	Comedy	a.k.a. My Husband and His Mothers a.k.a. Baby Come Back
Meine große Liebe	Peter Kahane	Thekla Carola Wied, Peter Bongartz, Michael Mendl, Gisela Trowe	Drama	
Meine Schwester und ich	Ilse Hofmann	Katharina Schubert, Nadeshda Brennicke, Arthur Brauss, Thomas Sarbacher	Drama	
Men Heroes and Gay Nazis	Rosa von Praunheim		Documentary	
Miss Texas	Ute Wieland	Natalia Wörner, Robert Seeliger	Comedy	
Molly's Way	Emily Atef	Mairead McKinley	Drama	
Mörder in Weiß – Der Tod lauert im OP	Uli Möller	Theresa Hübchen, Axel Milberg, Ernst Jacobi, Claudia Geisler-Bading	Thriller	(Shot in 2001)
Der Mörder meines Vaters	Urs Egger	Herbert Knaup, Barbara Auer, Marco Bretscher-Coschignano, Anna Brüggemann	Thriller	a.k.a. The Killer of My Father
Nachtasyl	Hardi Sturm	Esther Schweins, Hans Peter Hallwachs, Wolfgang Maria Bauer, Max Riemelt, Aleksandar Jovanovic, Marie Rönnebeck, Eva Herzig, Peter Benedict, Clelia Sarto, Ercan Durmaz, Uwe Karpa	Drama	a.k.a. The Lower Depths
Netto	Robert Thalheim	Milan Peschel, Sebastian Butz	Comedy	
Neue Freunde, neues Glück	Christine Kabisch	Christiane Hörbiger, Heidelinde Weis, Monika Peitsch, Ernst Jacobi, Martin Lüttge, Dieter Kirchlechner	Comedy	
The News	Matti Geschonneck	Jan Josef Liefers, Henry Hübchen, Uwe Kockisch, Nina Kunzendorf, Dagmar Manzel, Thomas Thieme, Herbert Feuerstein	Drama	
The Next-Door Neighbour Is Alive	Miguel Alexandre	Lisa Martinek, Andrea Sawatzki, Axel Milberg, Stephan Kampwirth	Thriller	
The Night of the Great Flood	Raymond Ley	Ulrich Tukur, Christiane Paul, Florian Lukas	Disaster	
No Songs of Love	Lars Kraume	Jürgen Vogel, Heike Makatsch, Florian Lukas	Comedy, Music	
No Sweat	Eoin Moore	Christiane Paul, Charly Hübner, Andreas Schmidt, Esther Zimmering, Laura Tonke, Edgar Selge, Franziska Walser	Comedy	a.k.a. In a Sweatbox
Noch einmal lieben	Anna Justice	Marie Zielcke, Jasmin Tabatabai, Steffen Groth	Drama	
NVA	Leander Haußmann	Detlev Buck, Kim Frank, Jasmin Schwiers	Comedy	
Offside	Buket Alakuş	Karoline Herfurth, Ken Duken, Thierry Van Werveke	Drama	a.k.a. In Another League a.k.a. Eine andere Liga
Oktoberfest	Johannes Brunner	Barbara Rudnik, Peter Lohmeyer	Drama	
One Day in Europe	Hannes Stöhr	Florian Lukas, Andrey Sokolov, Rachida Brakni, Ahmet Mümtaz Taylan, Péter Scherer, Luis Tosar	Anthology, Comedy	German-Spanish co-production
Paranoia's Box	Johannes Grieser	Heino Ferch, Claudia Michelsen, Michael Gwisdek	Thriller	a.k.a. Hölle im Kopf
Playa del Futuro	Peter Lichtefeld	Peter Lohmeyer, Nina Petri, Outi Mäenpää, Hilmi Sözer	Drama	
Polly Blue Eyes	Tomy Wigand	Susanne Bormann, Matthias Schweighöfer, Meret Becker, Ulrich Noethen, Maxi Warwel	Crime comedy	
Princess Undercover	Franziska Meyer Price	Muriel Baumeister, René Steinke, Thomas Fritsch, Gudrun Landgrebe, Mickey Hardt, Ilja Richter	Comedy	
A Quiet Love	Till Franzen	Hanna Schygulla, Beate Bille, Dominique Horwitz, Antoine Monot Jr.	Comedy	a.k.a. Die blaue Grenze
Reblaus	Klaus Gietinger	Katrin Bühring, Tom Beck, Elke Sommer, Tilo Prückner	Drama	
Rendezvous	Alexander Schüler	Lisa Martinek, Sven Walser	Drama	
Rose	Alain Gsponer	Corinna Harfouch, Jürgen Tonkel, Jacob Matschenz, Volker Bruch, Torben Liebrecht	Drama	
Scharf wie Chili	Markus Bräutigam	Alexandra Neldel, Kristian Kiehling	Comedy	
Schneeland	Hans W. Geißendörfer	Maria Schrader, Thomas Kretschmann, Julia Jentsch	Drama	a.k.a. Snowland
Schön, dass es Dich gibt	Reinhard Schwabenitzky	Elfi Eschke, Heio von Stetten	Comedy	Austrian-German co-production
Die schönsten Jahre	Gabi Kubach	Ulrike Kriener, Doris Schade, Julia Bremermann	Drama	
Secret Love: The Schoolboy and the Mailwoman	Franziska Buch	Kostja Ullmann, Marie Bäumer	Drama	
Seven Heavens	Michael Busch	Christoph Bach, Daniela Schulz	Drama	a.k.a. 7 Heavens
Siehst du mich?	Katinka Feistl	Viktoria Gabrysch, Sebastian Ströbel	Drama	
Sleeper	Benjamin Heisenberg	Bastian Trost, Mehdi Nebbou	Drama	
Smile of the Monsterfish	Till Endemann	Jacob Matschenz, Alice Dwyer	Drama	a.k.a. Das Lächeln der Tiefseefische
Sommer mit Hausfreund	Dennis Satin	Thekla Carola Wied, Friedrich von Thun, Jürg Löw, Andrea L'Arronge	Comedy	
Sophie Scholl – The Final Days	Marc Rothemund	Julia Jentsch	Historical drama, War	
A Sound of Thunder	Peter Hyams	Edward Burns, Catherine McCormack, Ben Kingsley, August Zirner, Heike Makatsch, Armin Rohde	Science fiction	American-British-German-Czech co-production
Spiele der Macht – 11011 Berlin	Markus Imboden	Martina Gedeck, Manfred Zapatka, Axel Milberg	Drama	
Sterne über Madeira	Marco Serafini	Denise Zich, Gregor Törzs, Lucas Gregorowicz, Fritz Karl, Michael Mendl, Antje Schmidt	Drama	
Suche Mann für meine Frau	Stefan Lukschy	Heikko Deutschmann, Aglaia Szyszkowitz, Ingo Naujoks	Comedy	a.k.a. Seeking a Man for My Wife
Summer in Berlin	Andreas Dresen	Inka Friedrich, Nadja Uhl, Andreas Schmidt	Drama	a.k.a. Sommer vorm Balkon
Summer Solstice	Giles Foster	Jacqueline Bisset, Honor Blackman, Franco Nero	Drama	British-German co-production
Take Your Life	Sabine Michel	Sebastian Urzendowsky, Agnieszka Grochowska	Comedy	a.k.a. Nimm dir dein Leben
Tausche Kind gegen Karriere	Michael Rowitz	Katharina Böhm, Esther Schweins, Oliver Korittke	Comedy	
This Far from Paradise	Stefan Bartmann	Suzan Anbeh, Erol Sander, Stephan Luca, Reiner Schöne, Anja Knauer	Drama	a.k.a. Ums Paradies betrogen
Three Degrees Colder	Florian Hoffmeister	Bibiana Beglau, Sebastian Blomberg, Meret Becker, Alexander Beyer, Johann von Bülow, Katharina Schüttler, Florian David Fitz	Drama	a.k.a. 3º Colder
Through This Night	Dagmar Knöpfel	Corinna Harfouch	Biography	a.k.a. Through this Night I Don't See a Single Star. German-Czech co-production
Tod eines Keilers	Urs Egger	Joachim Król, Stefan Kurt, Friedrich von Thun, Hans-Michael Rehberg, Lale Yavaş, María Casal	Crime	a.k.a. The Wild Boar a.k.a. The Boar. Swiss-German co-production
Der Todestunnel	Dominique Othenin-Girard	Aglaia Szyszkowitz, Götz Otto, Rosalinda Celentano, Gedeon Burkhard, Dominic Raacke, August Zirner, Ettore Bassi, Flavio Insinna	Disaster	German-Italian-Austrian co-production
Tote leben länger	Manfred Stelzer	Pierre Besson, Ursula Karven, Erika Marozsán	Crime	
Ein toter Bruder	Stefan Krohmer	Marie Bäumer, Thomas Dannemann, Michael Rotschopf, Valerie Koch	Thriller	a.k.a. A Dead Brother
Tsunami: Terror in the North Sea	Winfried Oelsner	Kristian Kiehling, Anja Knauer, Dan van Husen	Disaster	
Under the Dark Sun of Africa	Roland Suso Richter	Veronica Ferres, Jean-Hugues Anglade, Götz George, Matthias Habich	Drama	a.k.a. Kein Himmel über Afrika
Under the Ice	Aelrun Goette	Bibiana Beglau, Dirk Borchardt, Susanne Lothar, Sandra Borgmann	Drama	
Vacation from Life	Neele Vollmar	Gustav Peter Wöhler, Meret Becker	Drama	a.k.a. Holiday from Life a.k.a. Urlaub vom Leben
Der Vater meiner Schwester	Christoph Stark	Christian Berkel, Ludwig Blochberger, Katharina Schüttler, Anke Sevenich	Drama	
Vera – Die Frau des Sizilianers	Joseph Vilsmaier	Lara Joy Körner, Gunther Gillian, Mario Adorf, Max Tidof, Elisabeth Trissenaar, Heinz Hoenig, Martin Semmelrogge	Drama	a.k.a. Vera – A Sicilian Love
The Vulture Wally	Peter Sämann	Christine Neubauer, Siegfried Rauch, Martin Feifel	Drama	Austrian-German co‐production
Was für ein schöner Tag	Rolf Silber	Katharina Böhm, Hans Werner Meyer	Comedy	
Was Sie schon immer über Singles wissen wollten	Oliver Schmitz	Chiara Schoras, Oliver Bootz	Comedy	
Waves	Vivian Naefe	Marie Bäumer, Sebastian Blomberg, Matthias Habich, Monica Bleibtreu	Drama	a.k.a. Tides a.k.a. Wellen
The Wedding Party	Dominique Deruddere	Armin Rohde, Uwe Ochsenknecht	Thriller	a.k.a. Lune de guerre. German‐Belgian co‐production
Well Groomed	Ariane Zeller	Suzan Anbeh, Gregor Törzs, Thure Riefenstein, Gaby Dohm	Comedy	a.k.a. Heiraten macht mich nervös
Wen die Liebe trifft	Dagmar Damek	Franziska Petri, Erol Sander, Bettina Zimmermann, Fritz Karl, Diana Amft, Hanns Zischler, Martin Lüttge	Comedy	
Wenn der Vater mit dem Sohne	Udo Witte	Erol Sander, Aaron Altaras, Barbara Wussow	Drama	
What I Know About Her	Maren-Kea Freese	Alice Dwyer, Julia Richter	Crime	
The White Masai	Hermine Huntgeburth	Nina Hoss, Jacky Ido, Katja Flint	Drama	a.k.a. Die weiße Massai
Wie Licht schmeckt	Maurus vom Scheidt	Anya Deubel, Leo Zirner	Drama	
The Wild Blue Yonder	Werner Herzog	Brad Dourif	Science fiction	German-French-British co-production
Willenbrock	Andreas Dresen	Axel Prahl, Inka Friedrich, Dagmar Manzel	Drama	
Willkommen daheim	Ariane Zeller	Julia Richter, Timothy Peach, Kai Wiesinger	Comedy	
A Witch's Kiss	Diethard Küster	Christiane Paul, Wotan Wilke Möhring, Katja Riemann, Matthias Habich, Reinhard Mey	Comedy, Fantasy	a.k.a. Küss mich, Hexe!
Wo bleibst du, Baby?	Uwe Janson	Lisa Martinek, Felix Eitner	Comedy	
The Young Schiller	Martin Weinhart	Matthias Schweighöfer, Teresa Weißbach, Jürgen Tarrach, Barbara Auer, Ulrich Noethen	Biography	a.k.a. Schiller
Zeit der Wünsche	Rolf Schübel	Erhan Emre, Lale Yavaş, Tim Seyfi, Hilmi Sözer	Drama	
Zeppelin!	Gordian Maugg	Olaf Rauschenbach	Drama	
Das Zimmermädchen	Matthias Tiefenbacher	Stefanie Stappenbeck, Axel Milberg, Mareike Carrière	Comedy	a.k.a. The Maid
Zodiac Sign	Peter Patzak	Barnaby Metschurat, Heikko Deutschmann, Karin Giegerich, Vadim Glowna	Drama	a.k.a. Sternzeichen
Der zweite Blick	Ariane Zeller	Guntbert Warns, Suzanne von Borsody, Catrin Striebeck, Michael Mendl	Drama	

== 2006 ==
Title	Director	Cast	Genre	Notes
7 Dwarves: The Forest Is Not Enough	Sven Unterwaldt	Otto Waalkes, Martin Schneider, Mirco Nontschew, Nina Hagen, Cosma Shiva Hagen, Helge Schneider	Comedy, Fantasy	
30 Something	Annette Ernst	Stephan Luca, Sebastian Ströbel, Julia Brendler, Leonard Carow	Comedy	a.k.a. Thirtysomething a.k.a. Geile Zeiten
All Men Are Suspects	Stephan Wagner	Senta Berger, Nina Kunzendorf, Erdal Yıldız, Michael Gwisdek	Crime comedy	a.k.a. Nette Nachbarn küsst man nicht
Allein gegen die Angst	Martin Eigler	Anja Kling, Harald Schrott	Thriller	
Als der Fremde kam	Andreas Kleinert	Götz George, Dagmar Manzel, Christian Redl	Drama	
Asudem	Daryush Shokof	Narges Rashidi, Yangzom Brauen	Horror	
At the End of the Silence	Erhard Riedlsperger	Christine Neubauer, Bernhard Schir, Gesine Cukrowski, Martin Feifel	Thriller	a.k.a. Charlotte Link – Am Ende des Schweigens
Atomised	Oskar Roehler	Moritz Bleibtreu, Martina Gedeck, Franka Potente, Christian Ulmen, Nina Hoss	Drama	a.k.a. The Elementary Particles
Auf ewig und einen Tag	Markus Imboden	Heino Ferch, Fritz Karl, Martina Gedeck, Claudia Michelsen, Henry Hübchen, Juliane Köhler	Drama	
The Austrian Method	Florian Mischa Böder, Erica von Moeller, Gerrit Lucas, Jakob Ziemnicki, Alexander Tavakoli	Maja Beckmann, Arno Frisch, Carlo Ljubek, Susanne Lothar, Johann von Bülow	Anthology, Drama	
Bad Girls	Thomas Nennstiel	Simone Thomalla, Lisa Maria Potthoff, Max Tidof	Crime comedy	a.k.a. Entführ mich, Liebling
Baruto no Gakuen	Masanobu Deme	Ken Matsudaira, Bruno Ganz, Jun Kunimura, Hiroshi Abe, Kostja Ullmann, Oliver Bootz	War	Japanese‐German co‐production
Der beste Lehrer der Welt	Lars Becker	Uwe Ochsenknecht, Natalia Wörner, Sergej Moya, Miriam Morgenstern	Comedy	
Bettis Bescherung	Thomas Freundner	Nadeshda Brennicke, Heinz Baumann, Wotan Wilke Möhring	Comedy	
Beyond the Balance	Bernd Heiber	Katja Flint, Xaver Hutter	Crime	a.k.a. Herzentöter
Black Sheep	Oliver Rihs	Robert Stadlober, Tom Schilling, Jule Böwe, Milan Peschel, Marc Hosemann	Anthology, Comedy	a.k.a. Schwarze Schafe. German‐Swiss co‐production
Blood Trails	Robert Krause	Rebecca Palmer, Ben Price	Horror	
Breaking the Surface	Felicitas Korn	Henriette Heinze, Golo Euler	Drama	a.k.a. Amour Fou a.k.a. Auftauchen
Brinkmann's Wrath	Harald Bergmann	Eckhard Rhode	Biography	
Burning Heart	Manfred Stelzer	Alexander Scheer, Ivan Anderson, Erhan Emre	Drama	
Bye Bye Harry!	Robert Young	Iddo Goldberg, Joanna Page, Tim Dutton, Bela B, Til Schweiger, Veronica Ferres	Crime comedy	British‐German‐Belgian-Slovak co‐production
Cannibal	Marian Dora	Carsten Frank	Horror	
Casino Royale	Martin Campbell	Daniel Craig, Eva Green, Mads Mikkelsen, Jeffrey Wright, Judi Dench, Giancarlo Giannini, Isaach de Bankolé, Ludger Pistor, Jürgen Tarrach	Action thriller, Spy	British‐American‐German‐Czech co‐production
Eine Chance für die Liebe	Dirk Regel	Jutta Speidel, Michael Mendl, Rudolf Kowalski	Drama	
Christmas Phobia	Joseph Vilsmaier	Fritz Wepper	Comedy	a.k.a. Das Weihnachts-Ekel. Austrian-German co‐production
City for Ransom	Dominik Graf	Uwe Kockisch, Mišel Matičević	Thriller	a.k.a. A City Is Blackmailed
The Cloud	Gregor Schnitzler	Paula Kalenberg, Franz Dinda	Disaster	a.k.a. Fall-Out
Cold Summer	Hartmut Schoen	Frederick Lau, Iris Berben, Heino Ferch, Inka Friedrich, Axel Prahl	Drama	a.k.a. The Wall – Berlin '61
The Conclave	Christoph Schrewe	Manuel Fullola, Brian Blessed	Historical drama	Co-produced with Canada
Copying Beethoven	Agnieszka Holland	Ed Harris, Diane Kruger	Biography, Music	American‐Hungarian-German co‐production
Crocodile Alert	Simon X. Rost	Christian Tramitz, Dirk Bach, Doreen Jacobi	Action comedy	a.k.a. Zwei zum Fressen gern
The Crown Prince	Robert Dornhelm	Max von Thun, Vittoria Puccini, Klaus Maria Brandauer, Christian Clavier, Omar Sharif	Biography	a.k.a. Kronprinz Rudolfs letzte Liebe. Austrian-German‐Italian-French co‐production
The Crows	Edzard Onneken	Susanna Simon, Stefan Jürgens, Doris Kunstmann	Horror	
The Cursed Treasure	Diethard Küster	Désirée Nosbusch, René Steinke, Tilo Prückner, Henning Baum	Adventure	a.k.a. Die Jäger des Ostsee-Schatzes
The Deception	Michael Steinke	Katja Weitzenböck, Heio von Stetten, Bernhard Schir, Rüdiger Vogler	Thriller	a.k.a. Die Täuschung
The Decision	Nikolaus Leytner	Jan Josef Liefers, Julia Stemberger, Friedrich von Thun	Drama	a.k.a. Die Entscheidung. German-Austrian co-production
Denk ich an Deutschland in der Nacht – Das Leben des Heinrich Heine	Gordian Maugg	Fabian Busch, Rüdiger Vogler, Katharina Wackernagel, Anna Brüggemann, Michael Mendl	Biography	
Destined to Witness	Jörg Grünler	Thando Walbaum, Steve-Marvin Dwumah, Veronica Ferres	Drama	
Deutschland. Ein Sommermärchen	Sönke Wortmann		Documentary, Sport	a.k.a. Germany. A Summer's Tale
Dieter: Der Film	Michael Schaack, Toby Genkel	—N/a	Animated	a.k.a. Dieter Bohlen: The Movie
DOA: Dead or Alive	Corey Yuen	Holly Valance, Devon Aoki, Jaime Pressly, Eric Roberts	Action	American‐German‐British co‐production
Dornröschen erwacht	Elmar Fischer	Nadja Uhl, Ulrich Tukur, Mišel Matičević, Marie-Lou Sellem	Thriller	
Double Trouble	Mark Schlichter	Ann-Kathrin Kramer, Heikko Deutschmann	Comedy	a.k.a. Heiratsschwindlerin mit Liebeskummer
Down the River	Marco Mittelstaedt	Henning Peker, Tom Jahn	Drama	a.k.a. Elbe
Dresden	Roland Suso Richter	Felicitas Woll, John Light, Benjamin Sadler, Heiner Lauterbach, Marie Bäumer	War	a.k.a. Dresden: The Inferno
Eden	Michael Hofmann	Josef Ostendorf, Charlotte Roche, Devid Striesow	Drama	German‐Swiss co‐production
Emma's Bliss	Sven Taddicken	Jürgen Vogel, Jördis Triebel	Drama	
Erased	Isabel Kleefeld	Tobias Moretti, Wotan Wilke Möhring, Jasmin Gerat, Ulrike Krumbiegel	Thriller	a.k.a. Mord auf Rezept. German-Austrian co-production
Es war Mord und ein Dorf schweigt	Jorgo Papavassiliou	Bettina Zimmermann, Johannes Brandrup, Walter Kreye, Horst Krause	Thriller	
Esperanza	Zsolt Bács	Anna Thalbach, Frank Giering, Mavie Hörbiger, Boris Aljinovic, Gojko Mitić	Comedy	
Eva Zacharias	Susanne Zanke	Christine Neubauer, Dominic Raacke	Drama	
F4: Vortex	Andreas Linke	Matthias Koeberlin, Mina Tander, Lisa Martinek	Disaster	a.k.a. Raging Twister a.k.a. Tornado
FC Venus	Ute Wieland	Nora Tschirner, Christian Ulmen, Heinz Hoenig, Anneke Kim Sarnau	Comedy, Sport	Remake of FC Venus (2005)
Feiern	Maja Classen		Documentary, Music	
Final Contract: Death on Delivery	Axel Sand	Drew Fuller, Alison King, Ken Bones, Tanja Wenzel	Action thriller	a.k.a. Ausgeliefert! Jagd durch Berlin
Folge deinem Herzen	Peter Sämann	Christine Neubauer, Francis Fulton-Smith, Timothy Peach, Michelle Molatlou, Zandile Msutwana, Fezile Mpela, Frances Ndlazilwana, Tshamano Sebe, Götz Otto	Drama	a.k.a. Follow Your Heart
Four Minutes	Chris Kraus	Monica Bleibtreu, Hannah Herzsprung	Drama, Music	a.k.a. 4 Minutes
Four Windows	Christian Moris Müller	Theresa Scholze, Margarita Broich, Thorsten Merten	Drama	a.k.a. 4 Windows
Eine Frage des Gewissens	Thomas Bohn	Christian Berkel, Nadeshda Brennicke	Drama	
Die Frau am Ende der Straße	Claudia Garde	Maren Eggert, Matthias Brandt, Inga Busch, Thorsten Merten	Drama	a.k.a. The Woman at the End of the Street
Die Frau des Heimkehrers	Gabi Kubach	Christine Neubauer, Martin Feifel, Timothy Peach, Eva-Maria Hagen, Peter Sodann	Drama	a.k.a. The Wife of the Returnee
Die Frau im roten Kleid	Thomas Jacob	Christiane Hörbiger, Katja Studt, Bernhard Schir	Drama	a.k.a. The Woman in Red
The Free Will	Matthias Glasner	Jürgen Vogel, Sabine Timoteo	Drama	
French for Beginners	Christian Ditter	François Goeske, Paula Schramm, Christian Tramitz	Comedy	German-French co-production
Freundinnen fürs Leben	Buket Alakuş	Anja Kling, Katharina Wackernagel, Jule Böwe	Comedy	
A Friend of Mine	Sebastian Schipper	Daniel Brühl, Jürgen Vogel	Comedy	
Full Metal Village	Cho Sung-hyung		Documentary, Music	
Fünf-Sterne-Kerle inklusive	Vivian Naefe	Katharina Wackernagel, Maximilian Brückner, Gila von Weitershausen, Dieter Landuris, Filip Peeters, Franz Buchrieser	Comedy	a.k.a. 5-Sterne-Kerle inklusive. German-Austrian co-production
Gefangene	Iain Dilthey	Jule Böwe, Andreas Schmidt	Drama	a.k.a. Prisoners
Das Geheimnis im Moor	Kai Wessel	Sebastian Blomberg, Anna Loos, Christian Redl, Angela Winkler	Thriller	
Good Girl, Bad Girl	Sebastian Vigg	Julia Stinshoff, Nick Brimble, Graham McTavish	Action thriller	
Grave Decisions	Marcus H. Rosenmüller	Markus Krojer, Fritz Karl	Comedy	a.k.a. Wer früher stirbt ist länger tot
Grimm Love	Martin Weisz	Thomas Kretschmann, Thomas Huber, Keri Russell	Horror	a.k.a. Rohtenburg
Hammer & Hart	Hermann Joha	Hendrik Duryn, Christof Maaß, Susan Sideropoulos, Türkiz Talay	Comedy	a.k.a. Hammer and Hart a.k.a. Hammer und Hart
Hannah	Erica von Moeller	Nina Hoss	Drama	a.k.a. Living with Hannah
Happily N'Ever After	Paul J. Bolger	—N/a	Animated	German-American co-production
Happy as One	Vanessa Jopp	Meret Becker, Hinnerk Schönemann, Stefanie Stappenbeck, Jana Pallaske	Drama	a.k.a. Komm näher
Ein Hauptgewinn für Papa	Bodo Fürneisen	Heio von Stetten, Anica Dobra, Dana Vávrová	Comedy	
Heavyweights	Marcus H. Rosenmüller	Sebastian Bezzel, Nicholas Ofczarek, Michael A. Grimm, Antoine Monot Jr., Simon Schwarz	Comedy, Sport	a.k.a. Schwere Jungs
Helen, Fred und Ted	Sherry Hormann	Andrea Sawatzki, Friedrich von Thun, Christian Berkel, Corinna Harfouch, August Zirner, Nina Kronjäger, Gisela Schneeberger	Comedy	a.k.a. Helen, Fred & Ted
Heute fängt mein Leben an	Christine Kabisch	Christiane Hörbiger, Denise Zich, Walter Kreye, Michael König, Max von Pufendorf	Comedy	
Die Hochzeit meines Vaters	Jobst Oetzmann	Bernadette Heerwagen, Anna Loos, Michael Mendl, Barnaby Metschurat	Comedy	
Hounded	Angelina Maccarone	Maren Kroymann, Kostja Ullmann	Drama	a.k.a. Punish Me a.k.a. Verfolgt
The House Is Burning	Holger Ernst	Harley Adams, John Diehl, Melissa Leo	Drama	Screened at the 2006 Cannes Film Festival
Hui Buh: The Goofy Ghost	Sebastian Niemann	Michael Herbig, Christoph Maria Herbst, Heike Makatsch, Nick Brimble, Hans Clarin	Family	a.k.a. Hui Buh: The Castle Ghost
Hunde haben kurze Beine	Josh Broecker	Tim Bergmann, Marie-Lou Sellem, Eva Habermann	Comedy	
I Am the Other Woman	Margarethe von Trotta	Katja Riemann, August Diehl, Armin Mueller-Stahl, Dieter Laser, Karin Dor	Drama	a.k.a. Ich bin die Andere
Ich leih mir eine Familie	Michael Rowitz	Hans Werner Meyer, Lisa Martinek, Sandra Speichert, Stefan Jürgens, Mickey Hardt, Ilja Richter	Comedy	a.k.a. I'll Borrow a Family
Im Himmel schreibt man Liebe anders	Helmut Förnbacher	Erol Sander, Eva Habermann	Drama	
Impossibly Yours	Torsten C. Fischer	Jessica Schwarz, Barbara Auer, Ulrich Thomsen, Tobias Moretti	Drama	a.k.a. Der Liebeswunsch
Impy's Island	Reinhard Klooss, Holger Tappe	—N/a	Animated	a.k.a. Urmel from the Ice Age
In the Name of Love	Peter Gersina	Annette Frier, Ellenie Salvo González, Mickey Hardt, Stephan Luca, Herbert Knaup	Comedy	a.k.a. Im Namen der Braut
Joy Division	Reg Traviss	Tom Schilling, Ed Stoppard, Bernadette Heerwagen, Bernard Hill, Suzanne von Borsody	Drama	a.k.a. Der Feind im Inneren a.k.a. Der Agent – Zwischen Gut und Böse. British‐German‐Hungarian co‐production
Kahlschlag	Patrick Tauss	Stipe Erceg, Nadeshda Brennicke, Lisa Maria Potthoff, Charly Hübner, Doris Kunstmann	Drama	
Karol Wojtyła – Geheimnisse eines Papstes	Gero von Boehm	Mario Adorf, Michael Mendl, Devid Striesow, Cosma Shiva Hagen	Biography	
Kidnapping McKinsey	Sibylle Tafel	Wotan Wilke Möhring, Muriel Baumeister, Arved Birnbaum	Crime comedy	a.k.a. 3 Engel auf der Chefetage
Kiss me Kismet	Stefan Holtz	Florian David Fitz, Mandala Tayde, Hilmi Sözer	Comedy	a.k.a. Meine verrückte türkische Hochzeit
Eine Krone für Isabell	Michael Keusch	Felicitas Woll, Hanns Zischler, Gila von Weitershausen, Torben Liebrecht	Comedy	
Kunstfehler	Marcus O. Rosenmüller	Sophie von Kessel, Günther Maria Halmer, Hans-Jochen Wagner, Daniel Morgenroth	Drama	
Kurhotel Alpenglück	Peter Sämann	Fritz Wepper, Michaela May, Franz Buchrieser, Siegfried Rauch	Comedy	a.k.a. Spa Hotel "Alpine Joy"
Ein langer Abschied	Johannes Fabrick	Sophie von Kessel, Tim Bergmann, Nina Gnädig	Drama	
Lasko: Death Train	Diethard Küster	Mathis Landwehr, Arnold Vosloo, Simon Dutton, Ken Bones	Action thriller	a.k.a. Im Auftrag des Vatikans
The Last Train	Joseph Vilsmaier	Sibel Kekilli, Gedeon Burkhard	Drama, War	
Leo	Vivian Naefe	Matthias Brandt, Gisela Schneeberger, Elmar Wepper, August Zirner	Comedy	
Eine Liebe im September	Gloria Behrens	Uschi Glas, Gila von Weitershausen, Peter Bongartz, Wolf Roth	Comedy	
Die Liebe kommt selten allein	Jan Ruzicka	Thekla Carola Wied, Peter Sattmann, Florian Martens	Comedy	
Liebes Leid und Lust	Ulrich Zrenner	Julia Dietze, Merab Ninidze, Katharina Müller-Elmau	Drama	
Life Actually	Alain Gsponer	Katja Riemann, Ulrich Noethen, Hannah Herzsprung, Juliane Köhler	Drama	a.k.a. Das wahre Leben
Lights in the Dusk	Aki Kaurismäki	Janne Hyytiäinen, Ilkka Koivula, Maria Järvenhelmi	Comedy drama	Finnish-German-French co-production
The Lives of Others	Florian Henckel von Donnersmarck	Ulrich Mühe, Martina Gedeck, Sebastian Koch, Ulrich Tukur	Drama	Won Academy Award for Best Foreign Language Film, Golden Globe Award for Best Foreign Language Film, 7x Deutscher Filmpreis
Longing	Valeska Grisebach	Andreas Müller, Ilka Welz, Anett Dornbusch	Drama	
Loving and Killing	Wolf Gremm	Anne Brendler, Gesine Cukrowski, Bernhard Schir, Francis Fulton-Smith, Nirut Sirijanya, Kelly Tanapat	Thriller	a.k.a. Loving & Killing a.k.a. Lieben und Töten a.k.a. Wie das Gift in die Mango kam
Lucy	Henner Winckler	Kim Schnitzer, Gordon Schmidt, Feo Aladag	Drama	
Lulu	Uwe Janson	Jessica Schwarz, Sylvester Groth, Alexander Scheer	Drama	
Lumber Kings	Matthias Keilich	Bjarne Mädel, Peter Sodann	Comedy	a.k.a. Die Könige der Nutzholzgewinnung
Der Mann im Strom	Niki Stein	Jan Fedder	Drama	
Maria am Wasser	Thomas Wendrich	Alexander Beyer, Annika Blendl	Drama	
Maria an Callas	Petra Katharina Wagner	Götz George, Claudia Michelsen	Drama	
Meine Tochter, mein Leben	Bodo Fürneisen	Thekla Carola Wied, Chiara Schoras, Michael Mendl, Matthias Koeberlin	Drama	a.k.a. My Daughter, My Life
A Mere Formality	Ralf Huettner	Christiane Paul, Marc Hosemann, Bastian Pastewka, Floriane Daniel, Michael Gwisdek, Oliver Korittke, Petra Schmidt-Schaller, İdil Üner	Comedy	a.k.a. Reine Formsache
Mörderische Erpressung	Markus Imboden	Hinnerk Schönemann, Mira Bartuschek	Crime	
Mozart – Ich hätte München Ehre gemacht	Bernd Fischerauer	Xaver Hutter, Hans-Michael Rehberg	Biography, Music	
Mr. Nanny – Ein Mann für Mama	Oliver Dommenget	Linda de Mol, Florian Fitz	Comedy	
Mutterglück	Christian Görlitz	Jürgen Vogel, Victoria Malektorovych, Andreas Schmidt	Thriller	
My Ex-Boyfriend's Wedding	Edzard Onneken	Suzan Anbeh, Janek Rieke, Tim Bergmann	Comedy	a.k.a. Heute heiratet mein Ex
My Husband's Getting Married Today	Michael Kreihsl	Aglaia Szyszkowitz, Walter Sittler, Friedrich von Thun, Nadeshda Brennicke, Ulrich Tukur	Comedy	
Neandertal	Ingo Haeb, Jan-Christoph Glaser	Jacob Matschenz, Andreas Schmidt	Drama	
Nevermore	Toke Constantin Hebbeln	Leonard Proxauf, Rolf Becker, Sylvester Groth	Drama	a.k.a. Nimmermeer
Nine Takes	Dietrich Brüggemann	Anna Brüggemann, Leslie Malton, Heio von Stetten	Comedy	a.k.a. 9 Takes a.k.a. Neun Szenen
Not All Were Murderers	Jo Baier	Aaron Altaras, Nadja Uhl, Hannelore Elsner, Katharina Thalbach, Axel Prahl	Drama, War	
Nothing but Ghosts	Martin Gypkens	August Diehl, Jessica Schwarz, Fritzi Haberlandt, Wotan Wilke Möhring	Drama	
Offset	Didi Danquart	Alexandra Maria Lara, Felix Klare, Răzvan Vasilescu	Drama	German-Romanian co‐production
One Way	Reto Salimbeni	Til Schweiger, Michael Clarke Duncan, Lauren Lee Smith, Eric Roberts	Drama	
Open Water 2: Adrift	Hans Horn	Susan May Pratt, Eric Dane	Drama	
Opposites Attract	Oliver Dommenget	Raphaël Vogt, Eva Hassmann, Peter Sattmann	Comedy	a.k.a. Meine bezaubernde Feindin
Out of Bounds	Peter Thorwarth	Dirk Benedict, Wotan Wilke Möhring, Ralf Richter	Comedy	a.k.a. Goldene Zeiten
Paradizers	Rolf S. Wolkenstein	Manuel Cortez, Jennifer Ulrich	Anthology	a.k.a. Lauf der Dinge
Peer Gynt	Uwe Janson	Robert Stadlober, Ulrich Mühe, Karoline Herfurth, Henny Reents, Pegah Ferydoni	Drama	
Perfume: The Story of a Murderer	Tom Tykwer	Ben Whishaw, Dustin Hoffman, Alan Rickman	Thriller	12 wins & 12 nominations
Pingpong	Matthias Luthardt	Marion Mitterhammer, Sebastian Urzendowsky	Drama	
A Pirate's Heart	Miguel Alexandre	Ken Duken, Claire Keim, Stephan Luca, Gottfried John, Gudrun Landgrebe	Adventure	a.k.a. Störtebeker
Pirate Vacation	Franziska Meyer Price	Christoph M. Ohrt, Ann-Kathrin Kramer, Max Tidof	Adventure comedy	a.k.a. Die Pirateninsel – Familie über Bord
Plötzlich Opa	Thomas Kronthaler	Günther Maria Halmer	Comedy	
Princess	Birgit Grosskopf	Irina Potapenko, Henriette Müller	Drama	
Rage	Züli Aladağ	Oktay Özdemir, August Zirner, Corinna Harfouch	Thriller	a.k.a. Wut
Rapture of the Deep	Thorsten Schmidt	Sophie Schütt, Julian Weigend, Merab Ninidze, Rolf Kanies, Karin Boyd	Adventure	a.k.a. Himmel über Australien
The Red Cockatoo	Dominik Graf	Max Riemelt, Jessica Schwarz, Ronald Zehrfeld	Drama	
Requiem	Hans-Christian Schmid	Sandra Hüller	Drama	
The Robber Hotzenplotz	Gernot Roll	Armin Rohde, Piet Klocke, Rufus Beck, Katharina Thalbach, Christiane Hörbiger	Family	
Rose unter Dornen	Dietmar Klein	Valerie Niehaus, Heinz Hoenig, Richy Müller, Thure Riefenstein, Sonja Kirchberger, Eva Pflug	Drama	a.k.a. A Rose Among Thorns
Running on Empty	Bülent Akinci	Jens Harzer	Drama	a.k.a. Der Lebensversicherer. Entered into the 28th Moscow International Film Festival
Saving the Christmas Goose	Jörg Grünler	Markus Krojer, Christian Tramitz, Katharina Müller-Elmau, Gesine Cukrowski, Götz Otto	Family	a.k.a. Rettet die Weihnachtsgans
Das Schneckenhaus	Florian Schwarz	Andrea Sawatzki, Ulrich Tukur, Manfred Zapatka	Thriller	
Schroeder's Wonderful World	Michael Schorr	Peter Schneider, Jürgen Prochnow, Eva-Maria Hagen, Gerhard Olschewski, Stanisława Celińska, Bernd Begemann	Comedy	
The Secret of St. Ambrose	Michael Wenning	Ulrich Mühe, Désirée Nosbusch, Günther Maria Halmer	Adventure, Family	
Der See der Träume	Wolf Gremm	Ursula Buschhorn, Michael von Au	Drama	a.k.a. The Lake of Dreams a.k.a. On Mystic Lake
The Shell Seekers	Piers Haggard	Vanessa Redgrave, Maximilian Schell, Sebastian Koch	Drama	British‐German co‐production
Shoppen	Ralf Westhoff	Katharina Marie Schubert, Julia Koschitz, Thomas Limpinsel	Comedy	a.k.a. Shoppen Munich
Sie ist meine Mutter	Dagmar Hirtz	Thekla Carola Wied, Kyra Mladeck, Rüdiger Vogler	Drama	a.k.a. She Is My Mother
Silver Wedding	Matti Geschonneck	Iris Berben, Matthias Habich, Corinna Harfouch	Drama	
Six Weeks of Fear	Hansjörg Thurn	Jan Sosniok, Ellenie Salvo González, İdil Üner, Mehdi Nebbou, André Hennicke, Katrin Sass	Thriller	a.k.a. 6 Weeks of Fear a.k.a. Verschleppt – Kein Weg zurück
Smoke Signs	Rudolf Thome	Hannelore Elsner, Karl Kranzkowski, Adriana Altaras, Serpil Turhan, Cornelius Schwalm	Comedy	
Sonja	Kirsi Marie Liimatainen	Sabrina Kruschwitz, Julia Kaufmann	Drama	
Storm Tide	Jorgo Papavassiliou	Benno Fürmann, Jan Josef Liefers, Nadja Uhl, Götz George, Heiner Lauterbach, Natalia Wörner, Christian Berkel	Disaster	
Strike	Volker Schlöndorff	Katharina Thalbach, Andrzej Chyra, Dominique Horwitz	Drama	German-Polish co-production
Stunde der Entscheidung	Michael Rowitz	Katharina Böhm, Stephan Kampwirth, Tim Bergmann, Bettina Zimmermann	Drama	a.k.a. On the Razor's Edge
Summer '04	Stefan Krohmer	Martina Gedeck, Robert Seeliger	Drama	
The Thief Lord	Richard Claus	Aaron Taylor-Johnson, Rollo Weeks, Vanessa Redgrave	Adventure	British-German co-production
Three Sisters Made in Germany	Oliver Storz	Barbara Rudnik, Karoline Eichhorn, Mavie Hörbiger, Stefan Kurt, Matthias Brandt	Drama	a.k.a. 3 Sisters Made in Germany
Tod einer Freundin	Diethard Klante	Katrin Bühring, Devid Striesow, Janek Rieke, Johanna Klante, Frank Giering, André Hennicke, Brigitte Hobmeier	Thriller	
Tollpension	Tim Trageser	Uwe Ochsenknecht, Petra Zieser, Bobby Brederlow, Jacob Matschenz	Comedy	
Der Tote am Strand	Martin Enlen	Silke Bodenbender, Monica Bleibtreu, Birge Schade, Matthias Brandt, Stephan Kampwirth, Justus von Dohnányi, Hans Peter Hallwachs	Crime drama	
Die Tote vom Deich	Matti Geschonneck	Christiane Paul, Martin Wuttke, Devid Striesow, Marcus Mittermeier, Elisabeth Trissenaar, Rolf Becker, Jürgen Hentsch, Stephan Kampwirth	Thriller	
Tough Enough	Detlev Buck	David Kross, Jenny Elvers	Drama	a.k.a. Knallhart
The Trip to Panama	Martin Otevrel	—N/a	Animated	a.k.a. Oh, wie schön ist Panama
Twisted Sister	Ed Herzog	Heike Makatsch, Anna Maria Mühe	Drama	a.k.a. Schwesterherz
Die Unbeugsamen	Dirk Regel	Wotan Wilke Möhring, Anna Loos	Drama	
Das unreine Mal	Thomas Freundner	Franziska Petri, Heikko Deutschmann, Hanna Schygulla, Lisa Kreuzer, Friedrich Schoenfelder	Thriller	
Unser Kindermädchen ist ein Millionär	Bettina Woernle	Julia Stemberger, Gregor Törzs, Michael Degen	Comedy	
Unser Reigen	Horst Königstein	Torben Liebrecht, Melanie Blocksdorf, Steven Gätjen	Drama	
Unter anderen Umständen	Judith Kennel	Natalia Wörner, Stefanie Stappenbeck, Matthias Brandt, Katrin Sass, Michael König	Crime	
Der Untergang der Pamir	Kaspar Heidelbach	Klaus J. Behrendt, Jan Josef Liefers, Herbert Knaup	Disaster	a.k.a. The Tragedy of the Pamir
Valerie	Birgit Möller	Agata Buzek	Drama	
Väter – Denn sie wissen nicht, was sich tut	Hermine Huntgeburth	Edgar Selge, Armin Rohde, Robert Gwisdek	Comedy	
Vater Undercover – Im Auftrag der Familie	Vivian Naefe	Armin Rohde, Esther Schweins, Edith Hancke	Comedy	a.k.a. Eine unmögliche Familie
Die Verlorenen	Christian Görlitz	Karoline Eichhorn, Andreas Pietschmann, David Selvas	Drama	
Vineta	Franziska Stünkel	Peter Lohmeyer, Ulrich Matthes, Justus von Dohnányi, Matthias Brandt, Herbert Fux	Drama	a.k.a. Vineta: The Secret Project
Vom Ende der Eiszeit	Friedemann Fromm	Veronica Ferres, Martin Feifel, August Schmölzer, Detlev Buck	Crime	a.k.a. End of the Ice Age
Warchild	Christian Wagner	Labina Mitevska	Drama	a.k.a. Stille Sehnsucht. German‐Slovenian co‐production
Where Is Fred?	Anno Saul	Til Schweiger, Jürgen Vogel, Alexandra Maria Lara, Anja Kling, Christoph Maria Herbst	Comedy	
Wholetrain	Florian Gaag	Elyas M'Barek, Mike Adler, Florian Renner, Jacob Matschenz	Drama	
Wild Chicks	Vivian Naefe	Michelle von Treuberg, Lucie Hollmann, Paula Riemann, Jette Hering, Zsá Zsá Inci Bürkle, Veronica Ferres	Family	
The Wild Soccer Bunch 3	Joachim Masannek	Jimi Blue Ochsenknecht, Wilson Gonzalez Ochsenknecht, Nick Romeo Reimann	Sport, Family	a.k.a. The Wild Guys 3
Windows on Monday	Ulrich Köhler	Isabelle Menke, Hans-Jochen Wagner, Ilie Năstase, Devid Striesow	Drama	a.k.a. Montag kommen die Fenster
Winter Journey	Hans Steinbichler	Josef Bierbichler, Sibel Kekilli, Hanna Schygulla	Drama	
You Told Me, You Love Me	Rudolf Thome	Hannelore Elsner, Johannes Herrschmann	Comedy	
Zwei Bräute und eine Affäre	Christoph Klünker	Tanja Wedhorn, Doreen Jacobi, André Röhner, Michael Degen, Daniela Ziegler	Drama	a.k.a. 2 Bräute und eine Affäre

== 2007 ==
Title	Director	Cast	Genre	Notes
12 heißt: Ich liebe dich	Connie Walther	Claudia Michelsen, Devid Striesow	Drama	
42plus	Sabine Derflinger	Claudia Michelsen, Ulrich Tukur, Tobias Moretti, Jacob Matschenz	Comedy	
2030 – Aufstand der Alten	Jörg Lühdorff	Bettina Zimmermann, Jürgen Schornagel	Science fiction	a.k.a. 2030: The Senior Rebellion.
Abducted	Johannes Grieser	Heiner Lauterbach, Claudia Michelsen	Thriller	a.k.a. Die Entführung
According to the Plan	Francis Meletzky	Corinna Harfouch, Dagmar Manzel, Kirsten Block	Comedy	a.k.a. According to Plan a.k.a. Frei nach Plan
Afternoon	Angela Schanelec	Mark Waschke, Angela Schanelec, Fritz Schediwy, Heinrich Horwitz, Jirka Zett	Drama	
After Effect	Stephan Geene	Sabine Timoteo	Drama	
An die Grenze	Urs Egger	Jacob Matschenz, Bernadette Heerwagen, Corinna Harfouch, Max Riemelt	Drama	
And Along Come Tourists	Robert Thalheim	Alexander Fehling, Ryszard Ronczewski, Barbara Wysocka	Drama	
Angsthasen	Franziska Buch	Edgar Selge, Nina Kunzendorf, Uwe Ochsenknecht, Claudia Messner, Jürgen Hentsch	Comedy	
Another Word and I'll Marry You!	Wilhelm Engelhardt	Anica Dobra, Richy Müller	Comedy	a.k.a. Noch ein Wort und ich heirate dich!
Die Anruferin	Felix Randau	Valerie Koch, Esther Schweins	Drama	a.k.a. The Calling Game
Autistic Disco	Hans Steinbichler	Samia Chancrin, Ulrich Rechenbach, Benjamin Bieber	Drama	
Autopilots	Bastian Günther	Charly Hübner, Manfred Zapatka, Walter Kreye, Wolfram Koch	Drama	
Balkan Traffic	Markus Stein, Milan V. Puzić	Petra Schmidt-Schaller, Marko Pustišek, Vladimir Pavic	Crime comedy	
Barricade	Timo Rose	Raine Brown, Joe Zaso, Manoush	Horror	
The Beheaded Rooster	Radu Gabrea	David Zimmerschied, Alicja Bachleda-Curuś, Oliver Stritzel	Drama, War	German-Romanian-Austrian-Hungarian co-production
Berlin Round Dance	Dieter Berner	Jana Klinge, Robert Gwisdek	Drama	a.k.a. Berliner Reigen
Bezaubernde Marie	Peter Weissflog	Marianne Sägebrecht	Comedy	
Bis zum Ellenbogen	Justus von Dohnányi	Jan Josef Liefers, Stefan Kurt, Justus von Dohnányi	Black comedy	
Der blinde Fleck	Tom Zenker	Jan-Gregor Kremp, Nina Petri, Henriette Schmidt	Crime	
Blood & Chocolate	Katja von Garnier	Agnes Bruckner, Hugh Dancy, Olivier Martinez, Katja Riemann	Fantasy	a.k.a. Blood and Chocolate. American-German co-production
BloodRayne 2: Deliverance	Uwe Boll	Natassia Malthe, Michael Paré	Horror	German-Canadian co-production
Blossoms of Desire	Michael Karen	Erol Sander, Katja Weitzenböck, Fauziah Nawi	Drama	a.k.a. Die Blüten der Sehnsucht
Breathful	Daryush Shokof	Narges Rashidi, Taies Farzan	Comedy	
Brotherhood of Blood	Michael Roesch, Peter Scheerer	Jason Connery, Victoria Pratt, Sid Haig, Ken Foree	Horror	American-German co-production
Bukarest Fleisch	Andy Fetscher	Friederike Kempter, Ioana Iacob	Horror	
Der Butler und die Prinzessin	Sibylle Tafel	Walter Sittler, Esther Schweins	Comedy	
The Cell	Bijan Benjamin	Yunus Cumartpay, Erkan Gündüz	Thriller	
Chubby Me	Thomas Nennstiel	Christine Neubauer, Henning Baum, Gregor Törzs	Comedy	a.k.a. Moppel-Ich
Contergan	Adolf Winkelmann	Benjamin Sadler, Katharina Wackernagel, Denise Marko, August Zirner, Sylvester Groth, Matthias Brandt, Hans Werner Meyer	Drama	
Copacabana	Xaver Schwarzenberger	Bruno Ganz, Nicole Heesters, Christiane Paul, Wotan Wilke Möhring, Erni Mangold, Devid Striesow, Friedrich von Thun	Drama	
The Counterfeiters	Stefan Ruzowitzky	Karl Markovics, August Diehl, Devid Striesow	Drama, War	German-Austrian co-production
Counterparts	Jan Bonny	Matthias Brandt, Victoria Trauttmansdorff, Wotan Wilke Möhring	Drama	a.k.a. Gegenüber
Crash Kids: Trust No One	Raoul Heimrich	Daniel Buder, Jim Boeven	Action thriller	
Cutting Edge	Carsten Strauch	Carsten Strauch, Christoph Maria Herbst, Cosma Shiva Hagen	Black comedy	a.k.a. Die Aufschneider
Dard Divorce	Olaf Ittenbach	Martina Ittenbach	Horror	
Day of Disaster	Peter Keglevic	Laura Tonke, Sophie von Kessel, Tim Bergmann, Johannes Brandrup, Herbert Knaup, Hanns Zischler	Disaster	a.k.a. Tarragona: Paradise on Fire
Du bist nicht allein	Bernd Böhlich	Katharina Thalbach, Axel Prahl, Karoline Eichhorn, Herbert Knaup	Comedy	a.k.a. You're Not Alone a.k.a. You Are Not Alone
Du gehörst mir	Tobias Ineichen	Katharina Lorenz, Tobias Moretti	Thriller	
Duel at Night	Matti Geschonneck	Iris Berben, Jürgen Vogel	Crime	
Durch Himmel und Hölle	Matthias Tiefenbacher	Natalia Wörner, Kai Wiesinger, Axel Milberg	Drama	
The Edge of Heaven	Fatih Akın	Nurgül Yeşilçay, Baki Davrak, Patrycia Ziółkowska, Nursel Köse, Tuncel Kurtiz, Hanna Schygulla	Drama	a.k.a. Auf der anderen Seite. Won the Best Screenplay award at Cannes
Eight Miles High	Achim Bornhak	Natalia Avelon, Matthias Schweighöfer, Alexander Scheer	Biography	a.k.a. Das wilde Leben
Einfache Leute	Thorsten Näter	Klaus J. Behrendt, Barbara Auer	Drama	
Einmal Dieb, immer Dieb	Michael Kreindl	Sascha Hehn, Christina Plate, Walter Kreye	Crime comedy	a.k.a. Once a Thief, Always a Thief
Erlkönig	Urs Egger	Silke Bodenbender, Felix Eitner, Henry Hübchen, Dirk Borchardt, Axel Milberg	Drama	
Die Erntehelferin	Peter Sämann	Christine Neubauer, Götz Otto, August Schmölzer	Drama	a.k.a. The Harvest Helper
Der falsche Tod	Martin Eigler	Anneke Kim Sarnau, Friedrich von Thun, Eleonore Weisgerber	Drama	
Family Rules	Marc Meyer	Samuel Finzi, Nina Kronjäger, Anna Maria Mühe	Drama	a.k.a. Wir sagen Du! Schatz.
Fashion Victims	Ingo Rasper	Edgar Selge, Florian Bartholomäi, Roman Knižka, Franziska Walser	Comedy	a.k.a. Reine Geschmacksache
Fata Morgana	Simon Groß	Matthias Schweighöfer, Jean-Hugues Anglade, Marie Zielcke	Drama	
Fjorde der Sehnsucht	Susanne Hake	Barbara Wussow, Christian Wolff, Irm Hermann	Drama	
Eine folgenschwere Affäre	Martin Enlen	Fritz Karl, Katharina Böhm, Peter Simonischek, Charly Hübner, Lisa Martinek	Thriller	
Die Frau vom Checkpoint Charlie	Miguel Alexandre	Veronica Ferres	Drama	
Die Frauen der Parkallee	Michael Steinke	Gerlinde Locker, Barbara Wussow, Janina Flieger, Tom Beck, Michael Roll, Günter Mack	Drama	
Freie Fahrt ins Glück	Ariane Zeller	Gila von Weitershausen, Michael Mendl, Suzan Anbeh	Comedy	a.k.a. Clear Run to Happiness
Für den unbekannten Hund	Benjamin Reding, Dominik Reding	Lukas Steltner, Ferris MC, Katharina Lorenz	Drama	
Fürchte dich nicht	Christiane Balthasar	Maria Simon, Herbert Knaup, Katja Weitzenböck, Justus von Dohnányi, Matthias Brandt, Katharina Thalbach, Henning Baum	Thriller	
General Dad	Oliver Schmitz	Hannes Jaenicke	Comedy	a.k.a. Allein unter Töchtern
Gipfelsturm	Bernd Fischerauer	Johannes Zirner, Kerstin Becke, Konstantin Wecker, Lisa Kreuzer, Monika Baumgartner, Hans-Michael Rehberg	Drama	
Die Gipfelstürmerin	Dirk Regel	Thekla Carola Wied, Peter Bongartz	Comedy	
Good Morning, Mr. Grothe	Lars Kraume	Sebastian Blomberg, Ludwig Trepte, Nina Kunzendorf	Drama	
Good Times	Marcus H. Rosenmüller	Anna Maria Sturm, Rosalie Thomass	Comedy	a.k.a. Best Times a.k.a. Beste Zeit
Die großen und die kleinen Wünsche	Ilse Hofmann	Günther Maria Halmer, Gaby Dohm, Rüdiger Vogler	Comedy	
Eine gute Mutter	Matthias Glasner	Barbara Auer, Jördis Triebel, Justus von Dohnányi	Thriller	a.k.a. Das Geheimnis der falschen Mutter
Head Under Water	Andreas Kleinert	Frederick Lau, August Diehl, Fritzi Haberlandt, Alice Dwyer, Devid Striesow	Thriller	a.k.a. Freischwimmer
The Heart Is a Dark Forest	Nicolette Krebitz	Nina Hoss, Devid Striesow	Drama	
Hilfe, die Familie kommt!	Dietmar Klein	Gaby Dohm, Günther Maria Halmer	Comedy	
Hochzeit um jeden Preis	Eoin Moore	Esther Zimmering, Christoph Bach, Roman Knižka, Katrin Sass	Comedy	
Hope	Stanisław Mucha	Rafał Fudalej, Wojciech Pszoniak	Drama	Polish-German co-production
Hotel Very Welcome	Sonja Heiss	Ricky Champ, Chris O'Dowd, Eva Löbau	Comedy	
Hounds	Ann-Kristin Reyels	Constantin von Jascheroff, Josef Hader, Ulrike Krumbiegel	Drama	a.k.a. Jagdhunde
The Hunt for Troy	Dror Zahavi	Heino Ferch, Mélanie Doutey, Justus von Dohnányi, Merab Ninidze, Matthias Koeberlin, Kostja Ullmann	Biography, Adventure	a.k.a. Der geheimnisvolle Schatz von Troja
Ich wollte nicht töten	Dagmar Hirtz	Jessica Schwarz, Hinnerk Schönemann	Drama	
Ideal Son-In-Law	Michael Rowitz	Barbara Rudnik, Florian Stetter, Diana Amft	Thriller	a.k.a. Der geheimnisvolle Schwiegersohn
In the Name of the King: A Dungeon Siege Tale	Uwe Boll	Jason Statham, Leelee Sobieski, Burt Reynolds, Ron Perlman, John Rhys-Davies, Ray Liotta	Fantasy	German-Canadian-American co-production
Jacob's Brother	Daniel Walta	Klaus J. Behrendt, Christoph Maria Herbst, Sophie Rogall, Hannelore Elsner	Drama	
Karger	Elke Hauck	Jens Klemig	Drama	
Kein Geld der Welt	Berno Kürten	Stefanie Stappenbeck, Steffen Groth, Uwe Ochsenknecht, Ludger Pistor, Mareike Carrière	Comedy	
Krauses Fest	Bernd Böhlich	Horst Krause, Gabriela Maria Schmeide, Dominique Horwitz, Andreas Schmidt, Carmen-Maja Antoni	Comedy	
Der Kronzeuge	Johannes Grieser	Tobias Moretti, Claudia Michelsen, Franziska Petri, Sylvester Groth	Thriller	
Kuckuckszeit	Johannes Fabrick	Inka Friedrich, Wotan Wilke Möhring	Drama	
Küss mich, Genosse!	Franziska Meyer Price	Josefine Preuß, Constantin von Jascheroff, Mira Bartuschek, René Steinke	Comedy, Fantasy	
Lamento	René Sydow, Daniel Hedfeld	Ralph Herforth, Dana Vávrová, Lena Amende, Sebastian Sommerfeld	Thriller	
Lawine	Thomas Kronthaler	Stephan Luca, Muriel Baumeister, Heio von Stetten	Disaster	
Leroy	Armin Völckers	Alain Morel, Anna Hausburg, Günther Kaufmann, Afrob	Comedy	
Der Letzte macht das Licht aus!	Clemens Schönborn	Jürgen Tarrach, Wolfram Koch, Mario Irrek, Jenny Schily, Iren Reppen	Drama	
Das letzte Stück Himmel	Jo Baier	Nora Tschirner, Max von Pufendorf, David Rott	Drama	
Liebe auf den dritten Blick	Helmut Metzger	Katja Weitzenböck, Roland Koch, Thure Riefenstein, Sabrina White, Dietrich Mattausch	Comedy	
Liebe ist das schönste Geschenk	Gabi Kubach	Michael von Au, Charles Brauer, Sandra Speichert, Nicole Heesters, Rüdiger Vogler	Comedy	a.k.a. Love Is the Most Beautiful Gift
Liebe nach Rezept	Jorgo Papavassiliou	Sonsee Neu, Uwe Ochsenknecht, Kai Wiesinger, Petra Kleinert, Golda Tencer	Comedy, Fantasy	
A Life So Far Away	Dietmar Klein	Heiner Lauterbach, Maja Maranow, Franz Dinda, Bernhard Schir	Drama	a.k.a. Das Glück am anderen Ende der Welt
Lissi und der wilde Kaiser	Michael Herbig	—N/a	Animated	a.k.a. Lissi and the Wild Emperor
Lost Child 312	Gabi Kubach	Christine Neubauer, Timothy Peach, Oliver Stritzel	Drama	
Love Comes Lately	Jan Schütte	Otto Tausig, Barbara Hershey, Rhea Perlman, Tovah Feldshuh, Elizabeth Peña	Comedy	American-Austrian-German co-production
Love Life	Maria Schrader	Netta Garti, Rade Šerbedžija	Drama	German-Israeli co-production
Love on Loan	Michael Kreihsl	Henriette Heinze, Felix Eitner, Aglaia Szyszkowitz	Crime comedy	
Lunik	Gilbert Beronneau	Anna Maria Mühe	Drama	
Madonnas	Maria Speth	Sandra Hüller	Drama	German-Belgian-Swiss co-production
Manatu	Edzard Onneken	Susanna Simon, Markus Knüfken, Pasquale Aleardi	Science fiction	
March of Millions	Kai Wessel	Maria Furtwängler, Jürgen Hentsch, Jean-Yves Berteloot, Angela Winkler, Hanns Zischler	Drama, War	a.k.a. Die Flucht
Marmorera	Markus Fischer	Eva Dewaele, Anatole Taubman, Mavie Hörbiger	Mystery, Horror	Swiss-German co-production
Die Masche mit der Liebe	Thomas Nennstiel	Anja Kling, Henning Baum, Gerit Kling	Comedy	
Max Minsky and Me	Anna Justice	Zoe Moore	Comedy	
Mein alter Freund Fritz	Dieter Wedel	Ulrich Tukur, Veronica Ferres, Peter Jordan, Uwe Bohm, Valerie Niehaus, Maximilian Brückner, Dorka Gryllus	Comedy	
Mein Mörder kommt zurück	Andreas Senn	Katharina Wackernagel, Matthias Koeberlin, Sandra Borgmann	Thriller	
Mein Traum von Afrika	Thomas Jacob	Jutta Speidel, Günther Maria Halmer, Thoko Ntshinga, Cindy Sampson, Anthony Oseyemi	Drama	a.k.a. My Dream of Africa
Messy Christmas	Vanessa Jopp	Martina Gedeck, Heino Ferch, Jasmin Tabatabai, Meret Becker, Roeland Wiesnekker, Alexandra Neldel	Comedy	a.k.a. Meine schöne Bescherung. Remake of In Bed with Santa (1999)
Military Academy	Granz Henman	Franz Dinda, Florian Lukas, Axel Stein	Comedy	a.k.a. Kein Bund fürs Leben
Missing	Jorgo Papavassiliou	Bettina Zimmermann, Pasquale Aleardi, Andreas Pietschmann	Thriller	
Momella: A Farm in Africa	Bernd Reufels	Christine Neubauer, Frank Behnke, Horst Janson	Biography	
Mondkalb	Sylke Enders	Juliane Köhler, Axel Prahl, Leonard Carow	Drama	
Muttis Liebling	Xaver Schwarzenberger	Marie Bäumer, Monica Bleibtreu, Gregor Bloéb, Friedrich von Thun	Comedy	Austrian-German co-production
My Führer – The Really Truest Truth About Adolf Hitler	Dani Levy	Helge Schneider, Ulrich Mühe, Sylvester Groth	Comedy, War	a.k.a. Mein Führer: The Truly Truest Truth About Adolf Hitler. Entered into the 29th Moscow International Film Festival
Neues vom Wixxer	Philipp Stennert, Cyrill Boss	Oliver Kalkofe, Bastian Pastewka, Joachim Fuchsberger, Christiane Paul, Christoph Maria Herbst, Wolfgang Völz	Parody, Crime comedy	a.k.a. The Vexxer
Nichts ist vergessen	Nils Willbrandt	Jörg Schüttauf, Inka Friedrich, Volker Bruch	Drama	
Nichts geht mehr	Florian Mischa Böder	Jörg Pohl, Jean-Luc Bubert, Nadja Bobyleva, Susanne Bormann	Crime comedy	
No Coffee to Go	Helmut Metzger	Christiane Hörbiger, Michael Mendl, Ludger Pistor, Bjarne Mädel	Comedy	a.k.a. Niete zieht Hauptgewinn a.k.a. Dead Loss Draws Top Prize
Nothing Else Matters	Julia von Heinz	Paula Kalenberg, Marie-Luise Schramm, Vinzenz Kiefer	Drama	a.k.a. Was am Ende zählt
Der Novembermann	Jobst Oetzmann	Götz George, Burghart Klaußner, Bernadette Heerwagen, Barbara Auer	Drama	
Nur ein kleines bisschen schwanger	Lars Montag	Stefanie Stappenbeck, Markus Meyer	Comedy	
Oh Tannenbaum	Matthias Tiefenbacher	Günther Maria Halmer, Jutta Speidel, Lucas Gregorowicz	Comedy	
Ohne einander	Diethard Klante	Jürgen Prochnow, Franziska Walser, Klaus Pohl, Vijessna Ferkic	Drama	
An Old Maid	Hendrik Handloegten	Fritzi Haberlandt, Matthias Schweighöfer	Drama	a.k.a. Ein spätes Mädchen
The Other	Ariel Rotter	Julio Chávez	Drama	Argentine-French-German co-production
The Other Boy	Volker Einrauch	Barbara Auer, Peter Lohmeyer, Christian Berkel, Andrea Sawatzki, Willi Gerk, Tim Oliver Schultz	Drama	
Paparazzo	Stephan Wagner	David Rott, Agata Buzek, Florian Stetter	Thriller	(Shot in 2004)
Partnertausch	Thorsten Schmidt	Bjarne Mädel, Nadeshda Brennicke, Christina Große, Pierre Besson	Comedy	
Pool of Princesses	Bettina Blümner		Documentary	a.k.a. Prinzessinnenbad
Pornorama	Marc Rothemund	Tom Schilling, Benno Fürmann, Karoline Herfurth, Valentina Lodovini, Michael Gwisdek	Comedy	
Postal	Uwe Boll	Zack Ward, Dave Foley, J. K. Simmons, David Huddleston, Seymour Cassel, Ralf Moeller	Black comedy	American-German co-production
Prague: Iron Curtain	Lutz Konermann	Anneke Kim Sarnau, Christoph Bach, Hans Werner Meyer, Hinnerk Schönemann, Valerie Koch, Dietrich Mattausch	Drama	a.k.a. Prager Botschaft
Rabbit Without Ears	Til Schweiger	Til Schweiger, Nora Tschirner, Matthias Schweighöfer, Jürgen Vogel	Comedy	a.k.a. Keinohrhasen. 6 wins & 2 noms. for German film awards
Raging Inferno	Rainer Matsutani	Stephan Luca, Silke Bodenbender, Klaus J. Behrendt	Disaster	a.k.a. Das Inferno – Flammen über Berlin
Reclaim Your Brain	Hans Weingartner	Moritz Bleibtreu	Comedy	a.k.a. Free Rainer
Reife Leistung!	Martin Gies	Walter Sittler, Ina Paule Klink, Angela Roy	Comedy	
Resident Evil: Extinction	Russell Mulcahy	Milla Jovovich	Action, Horror	German-Australian-French-British-American co-production
Rudy: The Return of the Racing Pig	Peter Timm	Sebastian Koch, Sophie von Kessel	Family	
Runaway Horse	Rainer Kaufmann	Katja Riemann, Ulrich Tukur, Ulrich Noethen, Petra Schmidt-Schaller	Drama	
Schuld und Unschuld	Marcus O. Rosenmüller	Tanja Wedhorn, Matthias Habich, Heinz Hoenig, Hans Sigl, Florian Fitz, Uwe Friedrichsen	Drama	
A Scoop of Love	Oliver Dommenget	Annette Frier, Pasquale Aleardi, Jan Sosniok, Jasmin Wagner	Comedy	a.k.a. Erdbeereis mit Liebe
Seven Days Sunday	Niels Laupert	Ludwig Trepte, Martin Kiefer	Crime	
Shanghai Baby	Berengar Pfahl	Bai Ling, Luke Goss, Gregory Wong, Seiko Matsuda, Katja Riemann, Cheng Pei-pei	Drama	
Snipers Valley	Rudolf Schweiger	Adrian Topol, Max Riemelt, Susanne Bormann, Anatole Taubman, Damir Džumhur	War	a.k.a. Mörderischer Frieden
Sooner or Later	Ulrike von Ribbeck	Lola Klamroth, Peter Lohmeyer, Harald Schrott	Drama	
Späte Aussicht	Sylvia Hoffman	Herbert Knaup, Anna Maria Mühe, Suzanne von Borsody, Ernst Stankovski, Rosemarie Fendel, Heinz Baumann, Rosel Zech	Drama	
Special Escort	Maggie Peren	Florian Lukas, Herbert Knaup, Sebastian Bezzel, Gustav Peter Wöhler, Kostja Ullmann	Comedy	a.k.a. Stellungswechsel
Starting Over	Giles Foster	Rutger Hauer, Iain Glen, Suzanne von Borsody	Drama	British-German co-production
Straight	Nicolas Flessa	Beba Ebner, Eralp Uzun, Florian Sonnefeld	Drama	
Suddenly Gina	Maria von Heland	Jan Josef Liefers, Julia Jentsch, Iris Berben, Catherine Deneuve	Comedy	a.k.a. Frühstück mit einer Unbekannten. Remake of The Girl in the Café (2005)
Sweet Like Chocolate	Sophie Allet-Coche	Sophie Schütt, Dominic Raacke, Charly Hübner	Comedy	a.k.a. Wie angelt man sich seine Chefin
Tanz auf dem Regenbogen	Peter Weissflog	Eva Habermann, Miguel Herz-Kestranek, Gunther Gillian, Christina Plate	Drama	
Ein Teufel für Familie Engel	Rolf Silber	Christoph M. Ohrt, Simone Thomalla, Ingo Naujoks	Comedy, Fantasy	
Teufelsbraten	Hermine Huntgeburth	Anna Fischer, Ulrich Noethen, Margarita Broich, Alice Dwyer, Ludger Pistor, Corinna Harfouch, Harald Schmidt	Drama	a.k.a. The Hidden Word
Theo, Agnes, Bibi und die anderen	Kaspar Heidelbach	Dietmar Bär, Anna Loos, Ingar Sigvardsdotter, Nina Petri	Comedy	German-Swedish co-production
The Three Robbers	Hayo Freitag	—N/a	Animated	a.k.a. Trick or Treaters
To the Limit	Pepe Danquart		Documentary	
Der Tod meiner Schwester	Miguel Alexandre	Désirée Nosbusch, Bernadette Heerwagen, Jan-Gregor Kremp, Tshamano Sebe	Thriller	
Die Todesautomatik	Niki Stein	Stephan Kampwirth, Mišel Matičević	Drama	
Toyland	Jochen Alexander Freydank	Julia Jäger	Short	Oscar 2009
Trade	Marco Kreuzpaintner	Kevin Kline, Cesar Ramos, Alicja Bachleda, Paulina Gaitán	Drama	American-German co-production
Treasure Island	Hansjörg Thurn	Tobias Moretti, François Goeske, Christian Tramitz, Jürgen Vogel, Richy Müller, Christian Redl, Michael Gwisdek, André Hennicke	Adventure	
Two Mothers	Rosa von Praunheim		Documentary	a.k.a. Meine Mütter – Spurensuche in Riga
Ulzhan	Volker Schlöndorff	Philippe Torreton, Ayanat Ksenbai, David Bennent	Adventure	French-German-Kazakhstani co-production
Underdogs	Jan Hinrik Drevs	Thomas Sarbacher, Ingo Naujoks, Kida Khodr Ramadan, Thorsten Merten, Clelia Sarto, Hark Bohm, Patrycia Ziółkowska	Drama	
The Unknown Guest	Marcus O. Rosenmüller	Barbara Rudnik, Dominic Raacke, Jasmin Schwiers, Antonio Wannek	Thriller	a.k.a. Der fremde Gast a.k.a. The Strange Guest
The Unpolished	Pia Marais	Ceci Chuh, Birol Ünel, Pascale Schiller, Georg Friedrich, Joana Preiss	Drama	a.k.a. Die Unerzogenen
Vacation	Thomas Arslan	Angela Winkler, Karoline Eichhorn, Uwe Bohm	Drama	
Vater auf der Flucht	Franziska Meyer Price	Oliver Korittke, Eva Hassmann, Helena Siegmund-Schultze	Drama	
Verlassen	Christoph Stark	Martina Gedeck, Harald Krassnitzer, Janina Stopper	Drama	
Ein verlockendes Angebot	Tim Trageser	Christiane Paul, Devid Striesow, Richy Müller	Drama	
Vertraute Angst	Christiane Balthasar	Matthias Brandt, Johanna Gastdorf	Thriller	
Die Verzauberung	Wolfram Paulus	Christoph Waltz, Katharina Müller-Elmau, Heio von Stetten, Katharina Abt	Drama	
Video Kings	Daniel Acht, Ali Eckert	Fabian Busch, Wotan Wilke Möhring	Comedy	
The Visible and the Invisible	Rudolf Thome	Hannelore Elsner, Guntram Brattia, Hansa Czypionka, Rufus Beck	Drama	a.k.a. Das Sichtbare und das Unsichtbare
Vivere	Angelina Maccarone	Hannelore Elsner, Esther Zimmering, Kim Schnitzer	Drama	
Vollidiot	Tobi Baumann	Oliver Pocher	Comedy	
Vorne ist verdammt weit weg	Thomas Heinemann	Frank-Markus Barwasser, Peter Lohmeyer, Christiane Paul, Philipp Sonntag	Comedy	
The Vow	Dominik Graf	Mišel Matičević, Tanja Schleiff	Biography	a.k.a. Das Gelübde
War ich gut?	Christoph Schrewe	Marco Girnth, Ina Paule Klink, Jan Sosniok, Katja Woywood, Sonya Kraus	Comedy	
Was heißt hier Oma!	Ariane Zeller	Gaby Dohm, Tina Ruland, Florian Fitz, Rüdiger Vogler	Comedy	a.k.a. Who's the Grandma Here
Weißt was geil wär…?!	Mike Marzuk	Nadja Bobyleva, Axel Schreiber, Isaak Dentler	Comedy	
Wenn Liebe doch so einfach wär	Katinka Feistl	Yvonne Catterfeld, Stephan Luca, Sebastian Ströbel	Drama	
Why Men Don't Listen and Women Can't Read Maps	Leander Haußmann	Benno Fürmann, Jessica Schwarz, Uwe Ochsenknecht	Comedy	
Wiedersehen in Verona	Dirk Regel	Katharina Böhm, Christoph M. Ohrt, Ulrike C. Tscharre, Theresa Scholze, Mirko Lang	Comedy	
The Wild Soccer Bunch 4	Joachim Masannek	Jimi Blue Ochsenknecht, Wilson Gonzalez Ochsenknecht, Nick Romeo Reimann	Sport, Fantasy	a.k.a. The Wild Guys 4
Windland	Edward Berger	Joachim Król	Crime	
Das Wunder der Liebe	Thomas Jacob	Ruth Maria Kubitschek, Siegfried Rauch, Katja Woywood, Tina Ruland, Oliver Bootz	Drama	a.k.a. The Miracle of Love
Yella	Christian Petzold	Nina Hoss, Devid Striesow, Hinnerk Schönemann	Drama	
Youth Without Youth	Francis Ford Coppola	Tim Roth, Alexandra Maria Lara, Bruno Ganz	Drama, Fantasy, War	American-Romanian-German-French-Italian co-production
Der Zauber des Regenbogens	Dagmar Damek	Sandra Speichert, Erol Sander	Drama	
Zeit zu leben	Matti Geschonneck	Maja Maranow, Friedrich von Thun, Nicole Heesters, Katharina Böhm	Drama	
The Zürich Engagement	Stephan Meyer	Lisa Martinek, Christoph Waltz, Tim Bergmann	Comedy	
Zwei Wochen Chef	Annette Ernst	Felicitas Woll, Torben Liebrecht, Tatjana Alexander, Isabell Gerschke, Doris Kunstmann, Dietrich Mattausch	Comedy	a.k.a. 2 Wochen Chef
Das zweite Leben	Florian Gärtner	Rosemarie Fendel	Drama	

== 2008 ==
Title	Director	Cast	Genre	Notes
1:0 für das Glück	Walter Bannert	Thekla Carola Wied, Peter Sattmann, Eva Pflug	Comedy, Sport	a.k.a. Eins zu Null für das Glück a.k.a. 1–0 for Happiness
1st of May: All Belongs to You	Sven Taddicken, Jakob Ziemnicki, Carsten Ludwig, Jan-Christoph Glaser	Jacob Matschenz, Oktay Özdemir, Hannah Herzsprung, Peter Kurth, Maja Schöne	Anthology	a.k.a. Berlin: 1st of May
1½ Knights: In Search of the Ravishing Princess Herzelinde	Til Schweiger	Til Schweiger, Rick Kavanian, Julia Dietze, Thomas Gottschalk, Udo Kier	Comedy	
10 Seconds	Nicolai Rohde	Marie Bäumer, Sebastian Blomberg, Filip Peeters	Drama	a.k.a. Ten Seconds
80 Minutes	Thomas Jahn	Gabriel Mann, Josh Dallas, Natalia Avelon, Francis Fulton-Smith	Action thriller	a.k.a. Eighty Minutes
Absurdistan	Veit Helmer	Kristýna Maléřová, Max Mauff	Comedy	Entered into the 30th Moscow International Film Festival
Act of Violence	Lars Henning Jung	Vinzenz Kiefer, Tobias Schenke, Alice Dwyer	Drama	a.k.a. Höhere Gewalt
Adam Resurrected	Paul Schrader	Jeff Goldblum, Willem Dafoe, Joachim Król, Moritz Bleibtreu, Veronica Ferres, Juliane Köhler	Drama, War	American-German-Israeli co-production
Age and Beauty	Michael Klier	Henry Hübchen, Armin Rohde, Burghart Klaußner, Peter Lohmeyer	Drama	
Alone in the Dark II	Michael Roesch, Peter Scheerer	Lance Henriksen, Rick Yune, Danny Trejo, Jason Connery, Ralf Moeller	Horror	American-German co-production
The Anarchist's Wife	Peter Sehr, Marie Noëlle	María Valverde, Juan Diego Botto, Ivana Baquero, Nina Hoss, Jean-Marc Barr	Drama	Spanish-French-German co-production
The Architect	Ina Weisse	Josef Bierbichler, Hilde Van Mieghem, Sandra Hüller, Matthias Schweighöfer, Sophie Rois	Drama	
At Any Second	Jan Fehse	Sebastian Koch, Mina Tander, Wotan Wilke Möhring, Ronald Zehrfeld, Jenny Schily, Barbara Auer, Charly Hübner	Drama	
Avalanche	Jörg Lühdorff	Désirée Nosbusch, Vincent Perez, Eva Habermann	Disaster	a.k.a. Die Jahrhundertlawine. German-French-Austrian co-production
The Baader Meinhof Complex	Uli Edel	Moritz Bleibtreu, Martina Gedeck, Bruno Ganz, Johanna Wokalek, Alexandra Maria Lara, Heino Ferch, Nadja Uhl, Jan Josef Liefers	Drama	Nominated for Golden Globe Award for Best Foreign Language Film / nominated for the 2009 Academy Award for Best Foreign Language Film
Baching	Matthias Kiefersauer	Bernadette Heerwagen, Stefan Murr, Thomas Unger, Meike Droste	Drama	
Below the Earth's Surface	Sebastian Vigg	Liane Forestieri, Ercan Durmaz, Oliver Stritzel	Disaster	a.k.a. Abgrund – Eine Stadt stürzt ein
Berlin by the Sea	Wolfgang Eißler	Robert Stadlober, Anna Brüggemann, Jana Pallaske	Drama	
Berlin Calling	Hannes Stöhr	Paul Kalkbrenner, Rita Lengyel, Corinna Harfouch, Araba Walton, RP Kahl, Max Mauff, Henriette Müller	Drama, Music	
The Best Is Yet to Come	Rainer Kaufmann	Sophie von Kessel, Friedrich von Thun, Fabian Hinrichs, Marc Hosemann, Anneke Schwabe	Comedy	
The Best Place to Be	Marcus H. Rosenmüller	Anna Maria Sturm, Rosalie Thomass	Comedy	a.k.a. Beste Gegend
Bible Code	Christoph Schrewe	Cosma Shiva Hagen, Olivier Sitruk, Joachim Fuchsberger, James Faulkner	Thriller	German-French-Austrian co-production
Braams	Sven Taddicken	Jan-Gregor Kremp	Crime	a.k.a. Braams – Kein Mord ohne Leiche
The Bridge	Wolfgang Panzer	Franka Potente, François Goeske, Lars Steinhöfel	War	
Buddenbrooks	Heinrich Breloer	Armin Mueller-Stahl, Iris Berben, Jessica Schwarz, Mark Waschke, August Diehl	Drama	a.k.a. Buddenbrooks: The Decline of a Family
The Caesar Code	Carlo Rola	Heino Ferch, Dennenesch Zoudé, Judy Winter	Thriller	a.k.a. Und Jimmy ging zum Regenbogen
The Charlemagne Code	Ralf Huettner	Benjamin Sadler, Bettina Zimmermann, Fabian Busch, Hark Bohm	Adventure	a.k.a. Die Jagd nach dem Schatz der Nibelungen
Cherry Blossoms	Doris Dörrie	Elmar Wepper, Hannelore Elsner	Drama	
Chiko	Özgür Yıldırım	Denis Moschitto, Moritz Bleibtreu, Volkan Özcan, Fahri Yardım, Reyhan Şahin	Crime drama	
Cinderella for a Night	Anja Jacobs	Rike Schmid, Pasquale Aleardi, Esther Schweins, Jürgen Hentsch, Michael Gwisdek	Comedy	a.k.a. Küss mich, wenn es Liebe ist
Claudia – Das Mädchen von Kasse 1	Peter Stauch	Sophie Schütt, Ralf Bauer, Jan-Gregor Kremp	Comedy	
Cloud 9	Andreas Dresen	Ursula Werner	Drama	a.k.a. Cloud Nine
Come In and Burn Out	André Erkau	Maximilian Brückner, August Zirner, Johannes Allmayer	Comedy	a.k.a. Selbstgespräche
Coxless Pair	Jobst Oetzmann	Tino Mewes, Jacob Matschenz, Sophie Rogall, Lena Stolze, Alexandra Schalaudek	Drama	
Dangerous Students	Oliver Dommenget	Anja Kling, Thure Riefenstein	Crime	a.k.a. Der Amokläufer – Aus Spiel wird Ernst
Deadly Harvest	Oliver Schmitz	Theresa Scholze, Sebastian Ströbel, Tony Kgoroge	Thriller	Remake of Fleisch (1979)
Death in the Eifel	Johannes Grieser	Maria Simon, Christian Redl, Jacob Matschenz	Crime	
Dekker the Trucker	Sebastian Vigg	Mark Keller, Kaya Yanar, Nadeshda Brennicke	Action comedy	a.k.a. Dekker & Adi – Wer bremst verliert!
Dicke Liebe	Wilhelm Engelhardt	Viktoria Gabrysch, Nina Kronjäger, Barnaby Metschurat	Comedy	a.k.a. Tough Love
Don Quixote	Sibylle Tafel	Christoph Maria Herbst	Family	
Dr. Alemán	Tom Schreiber	August Diehl	Drama	German-Colombian co-production
Die dunkle Seite	Peter Keglevic	Melika Foroutan, Mišel Matičević	Thriller	
Eagle Eye	D. J. Caruso	Shia LaBeouf, Michelle Monaghan, Rosario Dawson, Michael Chiklis, Anthony Mackie, Billy Bob Thornton	Action thriller	American-German co-production
Einmal Toskana und zurück	Imogen Kimmel	Sabine Postel, Konstantin Wecker, Peter Sattmann	Comedy	
Evet, I Do!	Sinan Akkuş	Oliver Korittke, Lale Yavaş, Mürtüz Yolcu, Tim Seyfi, İdil Üner, Hülya Duyar	Comedy	
Far Cry	Uwe Boll	Til Schweiger, Udo Kier, Natalia Avelon, Ralf Moeller	Action	
Fast Track: No Limits	Axel Sand	Erin Cahill, Andrew Walker, Joseph Beattie, Alexia Barlier	Action	
Final Proclamation	Rainer Matsutani	Heiner Lauterbach, Gottfried John, Jean-Yves Berteloot	Thriller	a.k.a. The Papal Council a.k.a. Das Papst-Attentat a.k.a. Vaticangate
Die Frau aus dem Meer	Niki Stein	Anja Kling, Ulrich Tukur, Hanns Zischler	Thriller	
Die Frau des Frisörs	Jan Ruzicka	Muriel Baumeister, Nadeshda Brennicke, Dominique Horwitz	Comedy	
Freche Mädchen	Ute Wieland	Emilia Schüle, Selina Shirin Müller, Henriette Nagel, Anke Engelke, Piet Klocke	Comedy	a.k.a. Cheeky Girls
Freundschaften und andere Neurosen	Mark Schlichter	Christoph M. Ohrt, Harald Krassnitzer, Ann-Kathrin Kramer	Comedy	
Das Geheimnis im Wald	Peter Keglevic	Christoph Waltz, Pierre Besson, Sophie von Kessel	Crime	
Geliebte Clara	Helma Sanders-Brahms	Martina Gedeck, Pascal Greggory, Malik Zidi	Biography, Music	a.k.a. Clara a.k.a. Beloved Clara
Die Glücklichen	Jan Georg Schütte	Stephan Schad, Meret Becker, Susanne Wolff	Comedy	a.k.a. Lucky People
Gonger	Christian Theede	Sebastian Ströbel, Teresa Weißbach, Vadim Glowna, Bela B, Manuel Cortez	Horror	
A Good Boy	Torsten C. Fischer	Sebastian Urzendowsky, Klaus J. Behrendt	Drama	
A Grand Exit	Rainer Kaufmann	Bruno Ganz, Monica Bleibtreu	Comedy	a.k.a. Ein starker Abgang
The Great Tom	Niki Stein	Wolf-Niklas Schykowski, Sandra Borgmann, Aglaia Szyszkowitz	Drama	a.k.a. Der große Tom
Griechische Küsse	Felix Dünnemann	Alissa Jung, Manuel Cortez, Wanja Mues, Nele Kiper, Michael Degen	Comedy	
Hardcover	Christian Zübert	Wotan Wilke Möhring, Lucas Gregorowicz, Justus von Dohnányi	Crime comedy	
Heat Wave	Gregor Schnitzler	Susanna Simon, Johannes Brandrup, Rolf Kanies	Disaster	
Der Heckenschütze	Manfred Stelzer	Fabian Busch, Antonio Wannek, Stefanie Stappenbeck, Karl Kranzkowski, Alexander Scheer	Thriller	a.k.a. The Sniper
A Hero's Welcome	Brigitte Maria Bertele	Hanno Koffler, Petra Schmidt-Schaller, Maxim Mehmet	Drama	a.k.a. Nacht vor Augen
Hitman Zero	Robert Adrian Pejo	René Steinke, Sophie Schütt, Gojko Mitić	Thriller	a.k.a. Trapped a.k.a. Entführt – Ich hol dich da raus
Hunting for Love	Mike Eschmann	Muriel Baumeister, Pasquale Aleardi	Comedy	a.k.a. Eine bärenstarke Liebe. Swiss-German co-production
Hurenkinder	Andreas Kleinert	Nina Kunzendorf, Stefan Kurt, Hans Peter Hallwachs, Karin Baal	Drama	
Ich liebe den Mann meiner besten Freundin	Ulli Baumann	Suzan Anbeh, Doreen Jacobi, Clemens Schick, Adele Neuhauser	Drama	
Im Gehege	Kai Wessel	Robert Atzorn, Judith Rosmair, Axel Milberg, Eleonore Weisgerber	Thriller	
In Between Days	Lola Randl	Sylvana Krappatsch, André Jung, Samuel Finzi	Drama	a.k.a. The Visitor a.k.a. Days in Between a.k.a. Die Besucherin
In letzter Sekunde	Johannes Grieser	Sesede Terziyan, Peter Lohmeyer, Navíd Akhavan, Ercan Durmaz	Thriller	
Der indische Ring	Peter Sämann	Ruth-Maria Kubitschek, Uttara Baokar, Richa Saraswat, Florian Fitz, Franz Buchrieser, Mohan Bhandari, Tarun Khanna	Drama	a.k.a. The Indian Ring
Inkheart	Iain Softley	Brendan Fraser, Eliza Bennett, Paul Bettany, Helen Mirren, Andy Serkis, Jim Broadbent	Fantasy	American-German-British-Italian co-production
Innocence	Andreas Morell	Nadeshda Brennicke, Kai Wiesinger, Leslie Malton, Jacob Matschenz, Aylin Tezel	Drama	
The Invention of Curried Sausage	Ulla Wagner	Barbara Sukowa	Drama, War	a.k.a. The Invention of the Curried Sausage
Island of Light	Wolf Gremm	Christine Neubauer, Julia Hartmann, Ruth Maria Kubitschek, Jan Fedder, Martin Glade, Eckart von Hirschhausen	Drama	a.k.a. Summer Island
Jerichow	Christian Petzold	Benno Fürmann, Nina Hoss, Hilmi Sözer	Drama	
Ein Job	Christian Görlitz	Vanessa Redgrave, Victoria Malektorovych, Maxim Mehmet	Thriller	a.k.a. The Job
Killer Bees	Michael Karen	Janin Ullmann, Klaus J. Behrendt, Stephan Luca, Sonja Kirchberger, Paula Schramm	Horror, Disaster	a.k.a. Killer Swarm a.k.a. Die Bienen – Tödliche Bedrohung
Kleine Lüge für die Liebe	Dennis Satin	Linda de Mol, Robert Lohr	Comedy	
Krabat	Marco Kreuzpaintner	David Kross, Daniel Brühl, Christian Redl, Robert Stadlober, Paula Kalenberg, Daniel Steiner	Fantasy, Drama, Thriller	a.k.a. Krabat and the Legend of the Satanic Mill. Based on the children's novel Krabat written by German children's books author Otfried Preußler.
Krauts, Doubts & Rock 'n' Roll	Christian Görlitz	Maxim Mehmet, Andreas Schmidt, Anna Fischer, Susanne Lothar	Comedy, Music	a.k.a. Krauts, Doubts and Rock 'n' Roll a.k.a. Fleisch ist mein Gemüse
Küsse à la carte	Dietmar Klein	Janine Kunze, Heikko Deutschmann, Claudio Caiolo, Fabio Troiano, Manuel Cortez	Comedy	
The Legend of Brandner Kaspar	Joseph Vilsmaier	Franz Xaver Kroetz, Michael Herbig	Comedy, Fantasy	
Leo and Marie	Rolf Schübel	Wotan Wilke Möhring, Bernadette Heerwagen, Uwe Bohm, Suzan Anbeh	Drama	
Let's Do It in Finnish	Marco Petry	Jasmin Schwiers, Volker Bruch	Comedy, Music	
The Lie	Judith Kennel	Natalia Wörner, Uwe Bohm, Manfred Zapatka, Mark Waschke	Thriller	
Die Liebe ein Traum	Xaver Schwarzenberger	Florian David Fitz, Stefanie Dvorak, Johann von Bülow, Aglaia Szyszkowitz, Philippe Brenninkmeyer	Comedy	a.k.a. Love a Dream. German-Austrian co-production
Liebe für Fortgeschrittene	Walter Bannert	Heidelinde Weis, Günther Maria Halmer, Katharina Stemberger	Drama	German-Austrian co-production
Liesl Karlstadt & Karl Valentin	Jo Baier	Hannah Herzsprung, Johannes Herrschmann, Bettina Redlich	Biography	a.k.a. Liesl Karlstadt und Karl Valentin
The Lightship	Florian Gärtner	Jan Fedder, Axel Milberg, Tobias Schenke	Drama	a.k.a. The Fire Ship
Little Paris	Miriam Dehne	Sylta Fee Wegmann	Drama	
Long Shadows	Connie Walther	Franziska Petri, Ulrich Noethen	Thriller	a.k.a. Schattenwelt
A Long Way Home	Andreas Senn	Ken Duken, Ulrike Folkerts	Drama	a.k.a. Willkommen zu Hause
Lost City Raiders	Jean de Segonzac	James Brolin, Ian Somerhalder, Ben Cross, Bettina Zimmermann	Science fiction	
The Lost Samaritan	Thomas Jahn	Ian Somerhalder, Ruta Gedmintas, David Scheller	Thriller	
Love Greeting of an Angel	Jakob Schäuffelen	Marie Rönnebeck, Raphaël Vogt, Oliver Korittke	Drama	a.k.a. Liebesgruß an einen Engel
Love Trip Home	Sebastian Vigg	Wolke Hegenbarth, Julian Weigend, Oliver Bootz, Christine Kaufmann	Comedy	a.k.a. Liebesticket nach Hause
Love Under the Sign of the Dragon	Helmut Metzger	Erol Sander, Wong Li Lin	Drama	
Loyalty Points	Thomas Nennstiel	Christine Neubauer, Martin Lindow, Henning Baum	Comedy	a.k.a. Treuepunkte
The Loyalty Tester: Special Order Love	Markus Bräutigam	Jeanette Biedermann, Johannes Brandrup	Comedy	a.k.a. Die Treue-Testerin – Spezialauftrag Liebe
Manhunt	Laurent Jaoui	Franka Potente, Yvan Attal, Hanns Zischler	Biography	French-German co-production
Der Mann an ihrer Seite	Matthias Tiefenbacher	Stefanie Stappenbeck, Oliver Mommsen	Drama	
Mein Mann, der Trinker	Bodo Fürneisen	Robert Atzorn, Franziska Walser	Drama	
Mein Schüler, seine Mutter & ich	Andreas Linke	Uwe Ochsenknecht, Anica Dobra, Joel Basman	Comedy	a.k.a. Mein Schüler, seine Mutter und ich
Mein Traum von Venedig	Michael Kreindl	Thekla Carola Wied, Peter Sattmann	Comedy	a.k.a. My Dream of Venice
Meine fremde Tochter	Manfred Stelzer	Götz George, Alexander Scheer	Drama	
Meine Mutter, mein Bruder und ich!	Nuran David Calis	Erhan Emre	Drama	
Melodies of Spring	Martin Walz	Jan Henrik Stahlberg, Alexandra Neldel, Gedeon Burkhard, Jana Pallaske	Musical	a.k.a. Märzmelodie
The Miracle of Berlin	Roland Suso Richter	Veronica Ferres, Heino Ferch, Kostja Ullmann, Karoline Herfurth, Michael Gwisdek	Drama	
Mit einem Schlag	Vivian Naefe	Gisela Schneeberger, Peter Simonischek, Rüdiger Vogler	Drama	
Mogadischu	Roland Suso Richter	Thomas Kretschmann, Herbert Knaup, Nadja Uhl, Saïd Taghmaoui, Jürgen Tarrach, Christian Berkel	Historical drama	a.k.a. Mogadishu
The Moon and Other Lovers	Bernd Böhlich	Katharina Thalbach, Birol Ünel, Fritzi Haberlandt	Drama	Entered into the 30th Moscow International Film Festival
Mordshunger	Robert Adrian Pejo	Henry Hübchen, Bettina Zimmermann, Hans Werner Meyer	Thriller	
Morscholz	Timo Müller	Laurens Walter, Uwe Keller, Mélanie Fouché	Drama	
Das Musikhotel am Wolfgangsee	Stephan Pichl	Patrick Lindner, Mike Krüger, Sascha Hehn, Claudia Jung, Francine Jordi, Karl Moik	Musical comedy	Austrian-German-Swiss co-production
My Friend from Faro	Nana Neul	Anjorka Strechel, Lucie Hollmann, Manuel Cortez	Drama	a.k.a. To Faro
My Heart in Chile	Jörg Grünler	Hannelore Elsner, Franco Nero, Peter Haber, Bettina Zimmermann	Thriller	
My Mother, My Bride and I	Hans Steinbichler	Matthias Brandt, Monica Bleibtreu, Maria Popistașu	Drama	a.k.a. Die zweite Frau
My Mother's Tears	Alejandro Cardenas-Amelio	Érica Rivas, Rafael Ferro, Adrian Goessel, Fabian Busch, Alice Dwyer, Kristian Kiehling, Volkmar Kleinert	Drama	a.k.a. The Tears of My Mother a.k.a. Berlin-Buenos Aires
Narrenspiel	Markus F. Adrian	Wolfgang Menardi, Stephanie Schönfeld	Thriller	
A Night at the Grand Hotel	Thorsten Näter	Barbara Auer, Uwe Kockisch	Comedy	
North Face	Philipp Stölzl	Benno Fürmann, Florian Lukas, Johanna Wokalek, Ulrich Tukur	Historical fiction	a.k.a. Nordwand
November Child	Christian Schwochow	Anna Maria Mühe, Ulrich Matthes	Drama	
Nuit de chien	Werner Schroeter	Pascal Greggory, Bruno Todeschini, Jean-François Stévenin, Bulle Ogier, Sami Frey, Nathalie Delon	Drama	a.k.a. This Night. French-German-Portuguese co-production
Olivia and Jai	Dieter Kehler	Erol Sander, Eva Habermann, Mario Adorf, Gudrun Landgrebe, Navni Parihar	Drama	a.k.a. Rebecca Ryman: Wer Liebe verspricht
Otto; or Up with Dead People	Bruce LaBruce	Jey Crisfar, Marcel Schlutt	Horror	German-Canadian co-production
Outta Control	Nicole Weegmann	Ludwig Trepte, Jürgen Tonkel, Jenny Schily, Anneke Kim Sarnau, Leonard Lansink	Drama	a.k.a. Ihr könnt euch niemals sicher sein
Palermo Shooting	Wim Wenders	Campino, Dennis Hopper, Giovanna Mezzogiorno, Lou Reed	Drama	
Patchwork	Franziska Buch	Gabriela Maria Schmeide, Fritz Karl, Maria Schrader	Drama	
Peaceful Times	Neele Vollmar	Katharina Marie Schubert, Oliver Stokowski	Comedy	
Penthesilea Moabit	Rolf Teigler	Frank Dewitt, Hicran Kabak	Drama	
Perfect Hideout	Stephen Manuel	Billy Zane, Cristian Solimeno, Melinda Y. Cohen	Action	
A Piece of Me	Christoph Röhl	Ludwig Trepte, Karoline Teska	Drama	a.k.a. Ein Teil von mir
Plötzlich Millionär	Martin Gies	Uwe Steimle, Jürgen Tarrach	Comedy	
Polska Love Serenade	Monika Anna Wojtyllo	Claudia Eisinger, Sebastian Schwarz	Comedy	
Der Prinz von nebenan	Peter Stauch	Wolke Hegenbarth, Steffen Groth, Ingo Naujoks, Maike Bollow, Lena Amende, Bianca Hein	Comedy	
Punisher: War Zone	Lexi Alexander	Ray Stevenson, Dominic West	Superhero	American-Canadian-German co-production
Putzfrau Undercover	Ralf Huettner	Julia Koschitz, Katy Karrenbauer, Martina Hill, Alexander Beyer	Comedy	
Räuber Kneißl	Marcus H. Rosenmüller	Maximilian Brückner	Biography, Crime	
The Reader	Stephen Daldry	Kate Winslet, Ralph Fiennes, David Kross, Bruno Ganz	Romance, Drama	a.k.a. Der Vorleser. American-German co-production
The Red Baron	Nikolai Müllerschön	Matthias Schweighöfer, Joseph Fiennes, Til Schweiger, Lena Headey	War	
The Red Spot	Marie Miyayama	Yuki Inomata, Hans Kremer	Drama	a.k.a. Der rote Punkt; German-Japanese co-production
Remarque – Sein Weg zum Ruhm	Hanno Brühl	Max von Thun	Biography	
A Risk Worth Taking	Paul Seed	James Wilby, Tim Dutton, Muriel Baumeister	Drama	British-German co-production
Ein riskantes Spiel	Johannes Fabrick	Wotan Wilke Möhring, Tim Bergmann	Drama	
Robert Zimmermann Is Tangled Up in Love	Leander Haußmann	Tom Schilling, Maruschka Detmers	Comedy	a.k.a. Robert Zimmermann wundert sich über die Liebe
Die Rote Zora	Peter Kahane	Linn Reusse, Mario Adorf, Ben Becker, Dominique Horwitz	Family	a.k.a. The Outsiders of Uskoken Castle a.k.a. Red Zora
The Ruins	Carter Smith	Jonathan Tucker, Jena Malone, Shawn Ashmore, Laura Ramsey, Joe Anderson	Natural horror	American-Australian-German co-production
Run for Your Life!	Adnan G. Köse	Max Riemelt, Jasmin Schwiers, Uwe Ochsenknecht, Axel Stein	Drama	
The Russian Lover	Ulrich Stark	Iris Berben, Ronald Zehrfeld, Anna Brüggemann	Crime comedy	a.k.a. Der russische Geliebte
Schade um das schöne Geld	Lars Becker	Heike Makatsch, Uwe Ochsenknecht, Christian Ulmen, Armin Rohde, Cosma Shiva Hagen	Comedy	
Schokolade für den Chef	Manfred Stelzer	Götz George, Ludger Pistor, Irm Hermann	Comedy	
Sea of Lies	Jörg Grünler	Ann-Kathrin Kramer, Wolfgang Stumph, Thomas Sarbacher, Marion Mitterhammer	Thriller	a.k.a. Im Meer der Lügen. German-Austrian co-production
The Sea Wolf	Christoph Schrewe	Thomas Kretschmann, Florian Stetter	Drama	
The Secret of Anna	Jan Ruzicka	Jutta Speidel, Susanne Schäfer, Dietrich Hollinderbäumer, Peter Bongartz	Drama	a.k.a. Annas Geheimnis
The Secret of Loch Ness	Michael Rowitz	Lukas Schust, Hans Werner Meyer, Lisa Martinek, Thomas Fritsch	Family	a.k.a. Das Wunder von Loch Ness
The Secret of the Königssee	Marcus O. Rosenmüller	Yvonne Catterfeld, Hans Sigl	Thriller	
Sheep and Chips	Lars Jessen	Axel Prahl, Peter Jordan	Comedy	a.k.a. Die Schimmelreiter
Ship of No Return: The Final Voyage of the Gustloff	Joseph Vilsmaier	Kai Wiesinger, Valerie Niehaus, Heiner Lauterbach, Dana Vávrová	War, Disaster	a.k.a. The Crimson Ocean a.k.a. M/S Gustloff
The Sibyl Cipher	Carlo Rola	Iris Berben, Peter Simonischek, Nina Proll	Drama	a.k.a. Gott schützt die Liebenden
Sommerwellen	Dieter Kehler	Katja Weitzenböck, Michael Degen, Gaby Dohm, Christoph Grunert	Drama	
Speed Racer	The Wachowskis	Emile Hirsch, Christina Ricci, John Goodman, Susan Sarandon, Benno Fürmann, Richard Roundtree, Moritz Bleibtreu	Action, Sport	American-German-Australian co-production
Stille Post	Matthias Tiefenbacher	Ursula Karven, Sergej Moya, Axel Milberg, Isolda Dychauk	Drama	
The Stranger in Me	Emily Atef	Susanne Wolff, Johann von Bülow	Drama	a.k.a. Das Fremde in mir
Summer	Mike Marzuk	Jimi Blue Ochsenknecht, Sonja Gerhardt, Jannis Niewöhner	Comedy	
Der Tag, an dem ich meinen toten Mann traf	Matthias Luthardt	Franziska Petri, Pasquale Aleardi	Mystery	a.k.a. Memory
Talk to Me	Johannes Fabrick	Suzanne von Borsody, Hannes Jaenicke, Erika Marozsán	Comedy	a.k.a. Sleepless in Oldenburg
Tangerine	Irene von Alberti	Sabrina Ouazani, Nora Waldstätten, Alexander Scheer	Drama	
Teenage Angst	Thomas Stuber	Franz Dinda, Niklas Kohrt	Drama	
Ten: Umbra Mortis	Urs Egger	Tobias Moretti, Christoph Waltz, Steven Berkoff, Silke Bodenbender, Christian Redl	Thriller	a.k.a. Das Jüngste Gericht. German-Austrian co-production
The Things Between Us	Iris Janssen	Daniela Wutte, Christoph Jacobi	Drama	
Der Tote in der Mauer	Markus Imboden	Michael Mendl, Frank Giering, Devid Striesow, Anna Maria Mühe	Crime	
Transsiberian	Brad Anderson	Woody Harrelson, Emily Mortimer, Ben Kingsley	Thriller	British-German-Spanish co-production
Tropic Thunder	Ben Stiller	Ben Stiller, Jack Black, Robert Downey Jr., Steve Coogan, Jay Baruchel, Danny McBride, Brandon T. Jackson, Bill Hader, Nick Nolte	Satirical action comedy	American-British-German co-production
Tunnel Rats	Uwe Boll	Michael Paré	War	a.k.a. 1968 Tunnel Rats. Canadian-German co-production
U-900	Sven Unterwaldt	Atze Schröder	Comedy, War	
Up! Up! To the Sky	Hardi Sturm	Max Riemelt, Anneke Kim Sarnau, Katja Riemann, Armin Rohde	Comedy	a.k.a. Nicht von diesem Stern
Valkyrie	Bryan Singer	Tom Cruise, Kenneth Branagh, Bill Nighy, Terence Stamp, Thomas Kretschmann	War, Thriller	American-German co-production
Vater aus Liebe	Imogen Kimmel	Bettina Kupfer, Uwe Bohm, Tina Ruland, Michael Degen, Jonas Hämmerle	Drama	
Verrückt nach Emma	Ulrich Zrenner	Anja Kling, Armin Rohde, Anica Dobra	Crime comedy	
Vier Tage Toskana	Michael Keusch	Eva Habermann, Steffen Groth, Michaela May, Jytte-Merle Böhrnsen, Stephan Luca	Comedy	a.k.a. 4 Tage Toskana
Virus Undead	Wolf Wolff, Ohmuthi	Philipp Danne, Birthe Wolter, Anna Breuer	Horror	a.k.a. Beast Within
The Visit	Nikolaus Leytner	Christiane Hörbiger, Michael Mendl, Muriel Baumeister, Lisa Kreuzer, Rolf Hoppe	Drama	a.k.a. Der Besuch der alten Dame. German-Austrian co-production
Vom Atmen unter Wasser	Winfried Oelsner	Andrea Sawatzki, Adrian Topol, Thorsten Merten, Paula Kalenberg	Drama	
Waiting for Angelina	Hans-Christoph Blumenberg	Florian Lukas, Kostja Ullmann, Jana Pallaske, Gudrun Landgrebe, Barbara Auer	Comedy	
The Wall: The Final Days	Thomas Berger	Anja Kling, Heiner Lauterbach, Felicitas Woll, Hans Werner Meyer, Ronald Zehrfeld	Drama	a.k.a. Wir sind das Volk – Liebe kennt keine Grenzen
The Wave	Dennis Gansel	Jürgen Vogel, Max Riemelt, Jennifer Ulrich	Drama	
Die Weisheit der Wolken	Lars Becker	Ina Weisse, Tobias Schenke, Cosma Shiva Hagen, Axel Prahl, Ulrike Krumbiegel, Gila von Weitershausen, Manfred Zapatka, Sylvester Groth	Drama	
Weitertanzen	Friederike Jehn	Marie-Christine Friedrich, Barnaby Metschurat, Ingrid Caven, Stipe Erceg	Comedy	
Werther	Uwe Janson	Stefan Konarske, Hannah Herzsprung	Drama	a.k.a. The Sorrows of Young Werther
What if Death Do Us Part?	Ulrike Grote	Naomi Krauss, Eckhard Preuß, Ulrich Noethen, Monica Bleibtreu, Peter Jordan	Drama	
Without You I'm Nothing	Florian Eichinger	Peter Kurth, Martin Schleiß, Anna Brüggemann, Rosalie Thomass	Drama	a.k.a. Bergfest
A Woman in Berlin	Max Färberböck	Nina Hoss, Yevgeny Sidikhin	Drama, War	a.k.a. The Downfall of Berlin – Anonyma
A Year Ago in Winter	Caroline Link	Karoline Herfurth, Josef Bierbichler, Corinna Harfouch	Drama	a.k.a. Im Winter ein Jahr
Zwei Weihnachtsmänner	Tobi Baumann	Christoph Maria Herbst, Bastian Pastewka	Comedy	
Zwei Zivis zum Knutschen	Matthias Lehmann	Diana Amft, Denis Moschitto, Julian Sengelmann, Hilmi Sözer	Comedy	a.k.a. 2 Zivis zum Knutschen

== 2009 ==
Title	Director	Cast	Genre	Notes
12 Paces Without a Head	Sven Taddicken	Ronald Zehrfeld, Matthias Schweighöfer, Hinnerk Schönemann, Jacob Matschenz, Devid Striesow, Detlev Buck	Adventure comedy	a.k.a. Twelve Paces Without a Head
12 Winter	Thomas Stiller	Jürgen Vogel, Axel Prahl	Crime	a.k.a. Zwölf Winter
13 Semester	Frieder Wittich	Max Riemelt, Claudia Eisinger, Alexander Fehling, Robert Gwisdek	Comedy	
30 Karat Liebe	John Delbridge	Marion Kracht, Francis Fulton-Smith, Philippe Brenninkmeyer, Walter Kreye, Bongo Mbutuma	Drama	a.k.a. Dreißig Karat Liebe
30 Tage Angst	Thorsten Näter	Oliver Stokowski, Ann-Kathrin Kramer, Isolda Dychauk, Wolfgang Stumph, Stephanie Stumph, Cordula Trantow	Drama	a.k.a. Dreißig Tage Angst
40+ sucht neue Liebe	Andi Niessner	Nina Kronjäger, Oliver Stokowski	Comedy	
66/67: Fairplay Is Over	Carsten Ludwig, Jan-Christoph Glaser	Fabian Hinrichs, Christoph Bach, Melika Foroutan	Drama, Sport	a.k.a. 66/67: One Family Is Enough
Abducted	Matti Geschonneck	Heino Ferch, Nina Kunzendorf, Friedrich von Thun, Suzanne von Borsody, Matthias Brandt, Ulrich Thomsen, Hanns Zischler, Mark Waschke, Sibylle Canonica, Andrea Sawatzki	Thriller	
Africa My Home	Erhard Riedlsperger	Christine Neubauer, Dennenesch Zoudé, Bernhard Schir, Michael Roll	Drama	
Albert Schweitzer	Gavin Millar	Jeroen Krabbé, Barbara Hershey, Samuel West	Biography	German-South African co-production
All the Longing in the World	Wolf Gremm	Christine Neubauer, Erol Sander, Michael Mendl, Nirut Sirichanya	Crime	
All You Need Is Love: Meine Schwiegertochter ist ein Mann	Edzard Onneken	Helgi Schmid, Manuel Witting, Saskia Vester, Jenny Elvers, Jürgen Tonkel	Comedy	
Am Seil	Fabian Eder	Katharina Stemberger, Heio von Stetten	Drama	Austrian-German co-production
The Angel Maker	Christine Hartmann	Luisa Katharina Davids, Jonas Laux	Thriller	a.k.a. Wer hat Angst vorm schwarzen Mann? Austrian-German co-production
Army of the Silent	Roland Lang	Claudia Eisinger, Teresa Weißbach, Robert Gwisdek, Stefan Konarske, Dieter Hallervorden	Drama	a.k.a. La Isla Bonita
The Author of Himself: The Life of Marcel Reich-Ranicki	Dror Zahavi	Matthias Schweighöfer	Biography	a.k.a. Mein Leben – Marcel Reich-Ranicki
Der Bär ist los! Die Geschichte von Bruno	Xaver Schwarzenberger	Nadeshda Brennicke, Fritz Karl, Harald Krassnitzer, Herbert Knaup, Jarmo Mäkinen, Eero Milonoff	Comedy	Austrian-German co-production
Barfuß bis zum Hals	Hansjörg Thurn	Martin Brambach, Stefanie Höner, Constantin von Jascheroff, Christoph M. Ohrt	Comedy	a.k.a. Barefoot to the Neck
Being Mr. Kotschie	Norbert Baumgarten	Stefan Kurt, Claudia Michelsen, Ulrike Krumbiegel	Drama	a.k.a. Mensch Kotschie
Beloved Berlin Wall	Peter Timm	Felicitas Woll, Maxim Mehmet	Comedy	a.k.a. Liebe Mauer
Berlin 36	Kaspar Heidelbach	Karoline Herfurth, Sebastian Urzendowsky, Axel Prahl, August Zirner	Drama	
Between Today and Tomorrow	Fred Breinersdorfer	Gesine Cukrowski, Peter Lohmeyer	Drama	a.k.a. Eden Plaza
Beyond Remedy	Gerhard Hroß	Marie Zielcke, Rick Yune, David Gant	Horror	
Beyond the Wall	Friedemann Fromm	Katja Flint, Herbert Knaup, Henriette Confurius, Edgar Selge, Ulrike Krumbiegel	Drama	a.k.a. Behind the Wall
Bis an die Grenze	Marcus O. Rosenmüller	Katharina Böhm, Hans Werner Meyer, Götz Otto	Thriller	a.k.a. To the Edge
Die Blücherbande	Udo Witte	Armin Rohde, Jörg Schüttauf, Sebastian Bezzel, Michael Gwisdek, Horst Krause	Crime comedy	
Böses Erwachen	Urs Egger	Lisa Martinek, Uwe Ochsenknecht, Nina Proll, Max von Thun, Sophie Rois	Black comedy	Austrian-German co-production
The Boxer	Thomas Jahn	Josh Dallas, Stacy Keach, Kelly Adams, Henry Garrett, Leslie Malton	Drama	
Ceasefire	Lancelot von Naso	Matthias Habich, Thekla Reuten, Hannes Jaenicke, Max von Pufendorf	War	a.k.a. Waffenstillstand
Close to You	Almut Getto	Bastian Trost, Katharina Schüttler	Comedy	a.k.a. Very Close to You
Cloud Chasers	Edzard Onneken	Valerie Niehaus, Xaver Hutter, Max Tidof	Adventure	a.k.a. Super Storm a.k.a. Entscheidung in den Wolken
Crash Point: Berlin	Thomas Jauch	Peter Haber, Hannes Jaenicke	Disaster	a.k.a. Crashpoint – 90 Minuten bis zum Absturz
The Crocodiles	Christian Ditter	Nick Romeo Reimann, Fabian Halbig, Jacob Matschenz, Nora Tschirner	Family	a.k.a. Vorstadtkrokodile
Cry No More	Marcus O. Rosenmüller	Matt Battaglia, Christine Neubauer, Araba Walton	Thriller	a.k.a. Hot Trail
Cutlet for Three	Manfred Stelzer	Armin Rohde, Ludger Pistor	Comedy	a.k.a. Ein Schnitzel für drei
A Date for Life	Andi Niessner	Julia Stinshoff, Hannes Jaenicke, Uwe Ochsenknecht, Marion Mitterhammer	Comedy	a.k.a. Ein Date fürs Leben
Dawn of Evil: Rise of the Reich	Urs Odermatt	Tom Schilling, Götz George	Black comedy, Biography, History	a.k.a. Mein Kampf
The Day Will Come	Susanne Schneider	Iris Berben, Katharina Schüttler	Drama	a.k.a. Es kommt der Tag. German-French co-production
Desert Flower	Sherry Hormann	Liya Kebede	Drama	
Dinosaurier – Gegen uns seht ihr alt aus!	Leander Haußmann	Eva-Maria Hagen, Ezard Haußmann, Daniel Brühl, Nadja Tiller, Walter Giller, Ralf Wolter	Crime comedy	Remake of Lina Braake (1975)
The Dispensables	Andreas Arnstedt	Oskar Bökelmann, André Hennicke, Steffi Kühnert	Drama	
Distance	Thomas Sieben	Ken Duken, Franziska Weisz	Thriller	
Don't Be Afraid	Aelrun Goette	Michelle Barthel, Max Hegewald, Frank Giering	Drama	a.k.a. Keine Angst
The Door	Anno Saul	Mads Mikkelsen, Jessica Schwarz, Heike Makatsch	Mystery thriller	
Ein Dorf schweigt	Martin Enlen	Katharina Böhm, Inka Friedrich, Uwe Kockisch, Stephan Kampwirth	Drama, War	
Ein Dorf sieht Mord	Walter Weber	Lavinia Wilson, August Zirner, Corinna Harfouch, Thomas Thieme, Jochen Nickel	Thriller	
Dorfpunks	Lars Jessen	Cecil von Renner, Pit Bukowski, Axel Prahl	Comedy	
Dr. Hope	Martin Enlen	Heike Makatsch	Biography	
Die Drachen besiegen	Franziska Buch	Amelie Kiefer, Gabriela Maria Schmeide, Michael Fitz	Drama	
Durch diese Nacht	Rolf Silber	Oliver Stokowski, Katharina Böhm, Tim Bergmann, Bernadette Heerwagen	Drama	
Dutschke	Stefan Krohmer	Christoph Bach	Biography	a.k.a. Rudi Dutschke
The Echo of Guilt	Marcus O. Rosenmüller	Anna Loos, Daniel Morgenroth, Michael von Au, Judy Winter	Thriller	
Effi Briest	Hermine Huntgeburth	Julia Jentsch, Sebastian Koch, Mišel Matičević, Barbara Auer	Drama	
Ellas Geheimnis	Rainer Kaufmann	Hannelore Hoger, Rolf Lassgård, Chumani Pan, Mary Twala, Amelie Kiefer	Drama	a.k.a. Ella's Mystery a.k.a. Ella's Secret
Es liegt mir auf der Zunge	Kaspar Heidelbach	Jan Josef Liefers, Anna Loos	Biography	
Everyone Else	Maren Ade	Birgit Minichmayr, Lars Eidinger	Drama	a.k.a. Alle anderen
Die Ex bin ich	Katrin Rothe	Friederike Kempter, Maria Kwiatkowsky, Heike Warmuth	Drama	
Factor 8	Rainer Matsutani	Muriel Baumeister, Oliver Mommsen, André Hennicke, Emilia Schüle, François Goeske, Gesine Cukrowski	Disaster	
Ein Fall von Liebe	Jorgo Papavassiliou	Francis Fulton-Smith, Mariella Ahrens, Floriane Daniel	Drama	
The Farmer and the Stewardess	Uwe Wilhelm	Claudine Wilde, Timothy Peach, Siegfried Rauch, Walter Kreye	Comedy	a.k.a. Schwarzwaldliebe a.k.a. Black Forest Love
Fatal Rescue	Stephen Manuel	Steve Guttenberg	Drama	
Fire!	Raoul Heimrich	Gary Dourdan, Cosma Shiva Hagen, Ken Duken, Florentine Lahme, Ralph Herforth	Action thriller	German-Swiss co-production
Flug in die Nacht – Das Unglück von Überlingen	Till Endemann	Ken Duken	Drama	
Frau Böhm sagt Nein	Connie Walther	Senta Berger, Lavinia Wilson	Drama	
Die Frau, die im Wald verschwand	Oliver Storz	Stefan Kurt, Matthias Brandt, Karoline Eichhorn	Drama	a.k.a. The Woman Who Vanished in the Forest
Fresh Breeze	Imogen Kimmel	Günther Maria Halmer, Teresa Weißbach, Floriane Daniel	Drama	
Freunde von früher	Tim Moeck	Dominic Raacke, Sergej Moya, Anna König	Drama	
Die Freundin der Tochter	Josh Broecker	Katrin Sass, Esther Zimmering, Edgar Selge	Drama	
Friends Forever	Jesper Møller, Tony Loeser	—N/a	Animated	a.k.a. Mollywoop. German-French-Italian co-production
Für meine Kinder tu’ ich alles	Annette Ernst	Lisa Martinek, Mimi Fiedler, Sarah Masuch, Jasmin Schwiers, Aleksandar Jovanovic, Günther Kaufmann	Drama	
Gangs	Rainer Matsutani	Jimi Blue Ochsenknecht, Wilson Gonzalez Ochsenknecht, Emilia Schüle, Jannis Niewöhner	Crime	
Germany 09: 13 Short Films About the State of the Nation	Fatih Akin, Wolfgang Becker, Sylke Enders, Dominik Graf, Martin Gressmann, Christoph Hochhäusler, Romuald Karmakar, Nicolette Krebitz, Dani Levy, Angela Schanelec, Hans Steinbichler, Isabelle Stever, Tom Tykwer, Hans Weingartner	Josef Bierbichler, Benno Fürmann, Eva Habermann, Helene Hegemann, Sandra Hüller, Dani Levy, Denis Moschitto, Hans-Michael Rehberg, Anneke Kim Sarnau, Jasmin Tabatabai	Anthology	
Ghosted	Monika Treut	Inga Busch, Huan-Ru Ke, Hu Ting-ting, Jack Kao	Drama	German-Taiwanese co-production
Gletscherblut	Thomas Kronthaler	Thomas Unger, Tim Bergmann, Lisa Martinek, Günther Maria Halmer, Simon Schwarz, Lisa Kreuzer	Drama	
Gravity	Maximilian Erlenwein	Jürgen Vogel, Fabian Hinrichs, Nora Waldstätten	Crime drama	
The Gruffalo	Max Lang, Jakob Schuh	—N/a	Animated	British-German co-production
Ein halbes Leben	Nikolaus Leytner	Josef Hader, Matthias Habich, Franziska Walser	Crime drama	Austrian-German co-production
Hand in Hand	Thomas Berger	Corinna Harfouch, Margarita Breitkreiz	Drama	
Hangtime	Wolfgang Groos	Max Kupfer, Mišel Matičević, Mirjam Weichselbraun	Drama	
Happily N'Ever After 2	Steven E. Gordon, Boyd Kirkland	—N/a	Animated	American-German co-production
Haus und Kind	Andreas Kleinert	Marie Bäumer, Stefan Kurt, Stephanie Schönfeld, Gudrun Ritter	Comedy	
Heart of Fire	Luigi Falorni	Letekidan Micael	Drama	
Heute keine Entlassung	Thomas Nennstiel	Peter Sattmann, Mariele Millowitsch, Jürgen Tarrach	Comedy	
Hilde	Kai Wessel	Heike Makatsch, Dan Stevens	Biography	a.k.a. Hildegard Knef
Hitler vor Gericht	Bernd Fischerauer	Johannes Zirner, Peter Fricke, Heinrich Schmieder, Alexander Held, Johannes Silberschneider	Docudrama, History	a.k.a. Hitler on Trial
Hoffnung für Kummerow	Jan Ruzicka	Henry Hübchen, Dagmar Manzel, Uwe Kockisch	Comedy	
Hotel for Dogs	Thor Freudenthal	Emma Roberts, Jake T. Austin, Kyla Pratt, Lisa Kudrow, Kevin Dillon, Don Cheadle	Family comedy	American-German co-production
I've Never Been Happier	Alexander Adolph	Devid Striesow, Nadja Uhl, Jörg Schüttauf, Floriane Daniel, Elisabeth Trissenaar	Crime comedy	
Inglourious Basterds	Quentin Tarantino	Brad Pitt, Christoph Waltz, Mélanie Laurent, Diane Kruger, Daniel Brühl, Til Schweiger, Gedeon Burkhard, August Diehl, Ken Duken	War	American-German co-production
Impact	Michael Rohl	David James Elliott, Natasha Henstridge, Benjamin Sadler, James Cromwell	Disaster	Canadian-German co-production
The International	Tom Tykwer	Clive Owen, Naomi Watts, Armin Mueller-Stahl, Ulrich Thomsen	Thriller	American-German co-production
The Invisible Frame	Cynthia Beatt	Tilda Swinton	Documentary	
John Rabe	Florian Gallenberger	Ulrich Tukur, Steve Buscemi, Daniel Brühl	Historical drama, War	
Kaifeck Murder	Esther Gronenborn	Benno Fürmann, Alexandra Maria Lara, Michael Gwisdek	Thriller	a.k.a. Hinter Kaifeck
Kill Your Darling	Christian Theede	Philipp Danne, Heinz Werner Kraehkamp, Sylta Fee Wegmann, Fahri Yardım	Horror	
Kinder des Sturms	Miguel Alexandre	Felicitas Woll, Wotan Wilke Möhring, Magali Greif, Sophie Rois	Drama, War	a.k.a. Children of the Storm
Kopf oder Zahl	Benjamin Eicher, Timo Joh. Mayer	Heinz Hoenig, Ralf Richter, Jana Pallaske, Martin Semmelrogge, Mark Keller, Claude-Oliver Rudolph, Tyron Ricketts, Afrob, Harris, Jenny Elvers	Crime	
The Korean Wedding Chest	Ulrike Ottinger		Documentary	
Ladylike	Vanessa Jopp	Monica Bleibtreu, Gisela Schneeberger, Günther Maria Halmer	Comedy	
Die Lebenslüge	Peter Sämann	Christine Neubauer, Bernhard Bettermann	Drama	a.k.a. The Great Lie
Lenz	Andreas Morell	Barnaby Metschurat	Drama	
Liebe in anderen Umständen	Hansjörg Thurn	Ulrike Folkerts, Christoph M. Ohrt, Daniel Roesner, Isabell Gerschke	Comedy	
Liebe ist Verhandlungssache	Sven Bohse	Aglaia Szyszkowitz, Heikko Deutschmann, Nadja Tiller	Comedy	a.k.a. Love Is the Bottom Line
Liebe macht sexy	Michael Rowitz	Simone Thomalla, Kai Schumann, Helen Schneider	Comedy	
Liebe verlernt man nicht	Bettina Woernle	Katrin Sass, Stephan Luca	Drama	
Like It or Not	Ben Verbong	Katharina Marie Schubert, Senta Berger, Julia-Maria Köhler, Christiane Paul, Anna Böger	Drama	a.k.a. Ob ihr wollt oder nicht!
Lila, Lila	Alain Gsponer	Daniel Brühl, Hannah Herzsprung, Henry Hübchen	Comedy	a.k.a. My Words, My Lies – My Love
Lilly the Witch: The Dragon and the Magic Book	Stefan Ruzowitzky	Alina Freund, Pilar Bardem, Anja Kling, Ingo Naujoks	Family	
Little White Lies	Marcus H. Rosenmüller	Markus Krojer	Drama	a.k.a. The Pearl Color
Live Wire	Zoltan Paul	Hanno Koffler, Anna Fischer, Robert Stadlober, Harald Krassnitzer, Sunnyi Melles	Comedy	a.k.a. Unter Strom
Losing Balance	Felix Fuchssteiner	Elisa Schlott	Drama	a.k.a. Draußen am See
Love in Lion City	Heidi Kranz	Lara Joy Körner, Jason Chan, Wong Li Lin, Diana Körner	Drama	a.k.a. Love in the Lion City
Lucky Fritz	Stephen Manuel	Corey Feldman	Comedy	
Lulu and Jimi	Oskar Roehler	Jennifer Decker, Ray Fearon	Drama	
Der Mann auf der Brücke	Rolf Silber	Peter Lerchbaumer, Stephan Kampwirth, Claudia Michelsen	Comedy	
Der Mann aus der Pfalz	Thomas Schadt	Thomas Thieme, Renée Soutendijk, Claus Theo Gärtner	Biography, History	a.k.a. Helmut Kohl
Männersache	Gernot Roll	Mario Barth	Comedy	
Mein Flaschengeist und ich	Andreas Senn	Torben Liebrecht, Jasmin Schwiers, Sky du Mont	Comedy, Fantasy	
Mein Mann, seine Geliebte und ich	Dagmar Hirtz	Mariele Millowitsch, Natalia Wörner, Harald Krassnitzer	Comedy	
Mein Nachbar, sein Dackel & ich	Dirk Regel	Ann-Kathrin Kramer, Günther Maria Halmer	Comedy	a.k.a. Mein Nachbar, sein Dackel und ich
Melancholie der Engel	Marian Dora	Peter Martell, Carsten Frank	Horror	a.k.a. The Angels' Melancholia a.k.a. The Angel's Melancholy
Men in the City	Simon Verhoeven	Christian Ulmen, Florian David Fitz, Wotan Wilke Möhring, Nadja Uhl, Til Schweiger	Comedy	a.k.a. Männerherzen
Men of the North	Lars Jessen	Peter Heinrich Brix, Ulrike Kriener, Bjarne Mädel, Gerburg Jahnke	Comedy	a.k.a. Butter bei die Fische
Mine	Detlef Bothe	Detlef Bothe, Leni Wesselman	Thriller	a.k.a. Mein
Miss Stinnes Motors Round the World	Erica von Moeller	Sandra Hüller, Bjarne Henriksen	Adventure, Biography	a.k.a. Fraulein Stinnes Travels the World
Mommy Comes Over	Isabel Kleefeld	Senta Berger, Anja Kling, Jella Haase, Walter Kreye	Comedy	
Mord ist mein Geschäft, Liebling	Sebastian Niemann	Rick Kavanian, Nora Tschirner, Christian Tramitz, Bud Spencer, Franco Nero	Crime comedy	a.k.a. Killing Is My Business, Honey
Mörder kennen keine Grenzen	Jorgo Papavassiliou	Stephan Luca, Mina Tander, Petra Kleinert, Alexander Scheer, Michael Gwisdek	Crime, Science fiction	
The Murder Farm	Bettina Oberli	Julia Jentsch, Monica Bleibtreu	Drama, Horror	a.k.a. Tannöd
Murder on Amrum	Markus Imboden	Hinnerk Schönemann, Irina Potapenko, Barbara Rudnik, Thomas Thieme, Roeland Wiesnekker	Thriller	
My Beautiful Neighbor	Peter Kahane	Isabella Parkinson, Joachim Bißmeier, Jörg Schüttauf	Drama	a.k.a. Meine schöne Nachbarin
My Son, My Son, What Have Ye Done	Werner Herzog	Michael Shannon, Willem Dafoe, Chloë Sevigny, Udo Kier	Drama	American-German co-production
Nichts als Ärger mit den Männern	Matthias Steurer	Jule Ronstedt, Stephan Luca, Rüdiger Vogler, Heidelinde Weis, Götz Otto, Anian Zollner, Billie Zöckler	Comedy	
The Night a Village Vanished	Oliver Dommenget	Anna Loos, Thure Riefenstein, Horst Janson	Historical drama	a.k.a. Böseckendorf – Die Nacht, in der ein Dorf verschwand
Night Rush	Markus Welter	Stipe Erceg, Nils Althaus, Lena Dörrie	Crime	a.k.a. Im Sog der Nacht. Swiss-German co-production
Ninja Assassin	James McTeigue	Rain, Naomie Harris, Rick Yune, Sho Kosugi	Action	American-German co-production
Oh, What a Mess	Dirk Regel	Natalia Avelon, Johannes Zirner, Rolf Hoppe, Marianne Sägebrecht, Gudrun Landgrebe	Comedy	a.k.a. So ein Schlamassel
Operation Guardian Angel	Peter Fratzscher	Silke Bodenbender, Benjamin Sadler, Vadim Glowna	Thriller	a.k.a. Auftrag Schutzengel
Pandorum	Christian Alvart	Dennis Quaid, Ben Foster	Science fiction	German-British co-production
Parkour	Marc Rensing	Christoph Letkowski, Nora von Waldstätten, Marlon Kittel, Constantin von Jascheroff, Georg Friedrich, Arved Birnbaum	Drama	a.k.a. Parkour: Way of Life
Phantom Pain	Matthias Emcke	Til Schweiger, Jana Pallaske, Stipe Erceg	Drama	
Pianomania	Lilian Franck, Robert Cibis		Documentary	German-Austrian co-production
Pink	Rudolf Thome	Hannah Herzsprung, Cornelius Schwalm, Florian Panzner, Guntram Brattia, Christina Hecke	Drama	
Pope Joan	Sönke Wortmann	Johanna Wokalek, John Goodman	Drama	German-British-Italian-Spanish co-production
Pretty Mama	Berno Kürten	Birge Schade, Harald Schrott, Hannelore Hoger, Oliver Stokowski	Comedy	
Rabbit Without Ears 2	Til Schweiger	Til Schweiger, Nora Tschirner, Matthias Schweighöfer, Ken Duken, Uwe Ochsenknecht	Comedy	a.k.a. Zweiohrküken
Rampage	Uwe Boll	Brendan Fletcher, Michael Paré	Thriller	Canadian-German co-production
Résiste – Aufstand der Praktikanten	Jonas Grosch	Hannes Wegener, Katharina Wackernagel, Devid Striesow	Comedy	
Romeo und Jutta	Jörg Grünler	Wolfgang Stumph, Katja Riemann	Comedy	a.k.a. Romeo & Jutta
Romy	Torsten C. Fischer	Jessica Schwarz	Biography	a.k.a. Romy Schneider. German-French co-production
The Room in the Mirror	Rudi Gaul	Kirstin Fischer, Eva Wittenzellner	Drama, War	
Rosanna's Daughter	Franziska Buch	Veronica Ferres, Fritz Karl, Mathilde Bundschuh	Drama	
Salami Aleikum	Ali Samadi Ahadi	Navíd Akhavan, Anna Böger, Wolfgang Stumph, Michael Niavarani	Comedy	
Same Same but Different	Detlev Buck	David Kross, Apinya Sakuljaroensuk	Drama	
Saturn Returns	Lior Shamriz	Chloe Griffin, Tal Meiri	Drama	Israeli-German co-production
Saviors in the Night	Ludi Boeken	Veronica Ferres, Armin Rohde	Drama, War	a.k.a. Army of Saviours a.k.a. Among Peasants
Schatten der Gerechtigkeit	Hans-Günther Bücking	Yvonne Catterfeld, Richy Müller	Thriller	
Schaumküsse	Udo Witte	Christine Neubauer, Bernhard Bettermann, Oliver Bootz, Edith Hancke	Comedy	a.k.a. Meringue Kisses
Schuldig	Nils Willbrandt	Thekla Carola Wied, Effi Rabsilber, Jürgen Tarrach, Carin C. Tietze, Carlo Ljubek	Thriller	a.k.a. Guilty
Schutzlos	René Heisig	Carolina Vera, Matthias Brandt, Maximilian Brückner	Drama	
Sea of Death	Hans Horn	Lavinia Wilson, Fahri Yardım	Science fiction	a.k.a. Tod aus der Tiefe
Sea Wolf	Mike Barker	Sebastian Koch, Tim Roth, Neve Campbell	Drama	German-Canadian co-production
Shoot the Duke	Stephen Manuel	Stephen Baldwin, Bettina Zimmermann, Thomas Heinze	Action	
Sisi	Xaver Schwarzenberger	Cristiana Capotondi	Romance, Biography	German-Italian-Austrian co-production
Sleeping Songs	Andreas Struck	Stefan Rudolf	Drama	a.k.a. Schläft ein Lied in allen Dingen
Sleepless	Isabel Kleefeld	Senta Berger	Thriller	
Smoke Screen	Michael Keusch	Suzan Anbeh, Christoph Kottenkamp, Dietrich Mattausch	Drama	a.k.a. Longing for New Zealand a.k.a. Sehnsucht nach Neuseeland
Sometime in August	Sebastian Schipper	Marie Bäumer, Milan Peschel	Drama	a.k.a. Mitte Ende August
Ein Sommer in Long Island	Sibylle Tafel	Petra Schmidt-Schaller, Max von Thun, Marc Hosemann	Drama	
Ein Sommer mit Paul	Claudia Garde	Matthias Brandt, Max Schmuckert	Drama	
Soul Kitchen	Fatih Akın	Adam Bousdoukos, Birol Ünel, Moritz Bleibtreu, Wotan Wilke Möhring, Anna Bederke, Pheline Roggan, Dorka Gryllus	Comedy	
Spring Awakening	Nuran David Calis	Wilson Gonzalez Ochsenknecht, Constanze Wächter, Leon Pfannenmüller, Justus von Dohnányi	Drama	
Der Staat ist für den Menschen da	Bernd Fischerauer	Johannes Silberschneider, Hans-Michael Rehberg, Wilfried Klaus	Docudrama, History	a.k.a. Government for the People
Der Stinkstiefel	Thomas Nennstiel	Leonard Lansink, Josefine Preuß, Barbara Rudnik	Comedy	
Storm	Hans-Christian Schmid	Kerry Fox, Anamaria Marinca, Stephen Dillane, Rolf Lassgård	Drama	German-Danish-Dutch co-production
Summertime Blues	Marie Reich	François Goeske, Sarah Beck, Zoe Moore, Karoline Eichhorn	Comedy	
Tango im Schnee	Gabi Kubach	Ursela Monn, Peter Bongartz, Wolfgang Winkler	Drama	a.k.a. Tango in the Snow. German-Austrian co-production
Tender Parasites	Oliver Schwabe, Christian Becker	Robert Stadlober, Maja Schöne, Sylvester Groth	Drama	
Thanksgiving	Rainer Kaufmann	Herbert Knaup, August Zirner, Ulrich Noethen, Thure Riefenstein	Crime comedy	a.k.a. Erntedank
This Is Love	Matthias Glasner	Jens Albinus, Duyen Pham, Corinna Harfouch, Jürgen Vogel	Drama	
Tierisch verliebt	Ariane Zeller	Valerie Niehaus, Gregor Törzs	Drama	
Der Tiger oder Was Frauen lieben!	Niki Stein	Herbert Knaup, Ben Becker, Susanne Lothar, Stefanie Stappenbeck, Katharina Müller-Elmau	Comedy	
Totentanz	Corbinian Lippl	Gabriel Raab, Rosalie Thomass, Michael Mendl	Drama	
Die Treuhänderin	Horst Königstein	Johanna Christine Gehlen	Docudrama, Biography	a.k.a. Die Treuhänderin – Ein Porträt der Birgit Breuel
Der Typ, 13 Kinder & ich	Josh Broecker	Julia Brendler, Tim Bergmann, Zora Holt	Comedy	a.k.a. Der Typ, 13 Kinder und ich
Über den Tod hinaus	Andreas Senn	Silke Bodenbender, Charly Hübner, Thomas Sarbacher	Drama	
The Uninvited	The Guard Brothers	Elizabeth Banks, Emily Browning, Arielle Kebbel, David Strathairn	Psychological horror	American-Canadian-German co-production
Upstairs	Robert Adrian Pejo	Luke Perry, Kelly Harrison	Thriller	
Vacation with Dad	Mark von Seydlitz	Julia Stinshoff, Lambert Hamel	Comedy	a.k.a. Chaperoned a.k.a. Urlaub mit Papa
Der verlorene Sohn	Nina Grosse	Katja Flint, Kostja Ullmann	Drama	
Vicky the Viking	Michael Herbig	Jonas Hämmerle, Waldemar Kobus, Günther Kaufmann	Family, Adventure	a.k.a. Wickie the Mighty Viking. Based on the German-Austrian-Japanese Anime Television series of the same name.
Vision	Margarethe von Trotta	Barbara Sukowa, Heino Ferch, Hannah Herzsprung	Biography	a.k.a. Vision: From the Life of Hildegard von Bingen
Volcano	Uwe Janson	Matthias Koeberlin, Katharina Wackernagel, Heiner Lauterbach, Sonja Gerhardt, Katja Riemann, Armin Rohde, Yvonne Catterfeld	Disaster	
Von ganzem Herzen	Berno Kürten	Gudrun Landgrebe, Christian Kohlund	Comedy	
Wallace Line	Franz Müller	Marie-Lou Sellem, Àlex Brendemühl, Katharina Derr, Tim Hoffmann	Drama	a.k.a. Love of the Children
Was glücklich macht	Matthias Tiefenbacher	Peter Sattmann, Jutta Speidel, Katharina Lorenz	Comedy	
Wedding Fever in Campobello	Neele Vollmar	Lino Banfi, Christian Ulmen, Mina Tander	Comedy	a.k.a. Maria, He Doesn't Like It a.k.a. Maria, ihm schmeckt's nicht!
What You Don't See	Wolfgang Fischer	Ludwig Trepte, Frederick Lau, Alice Dwyer	Thriller	
When We Own The World	Judith Keil, Antje Kruska	Vincent Krüger, Christian Blümel, Willi Gerk	Drama	
Where to with Dad?	Tim Trageser	Dieter Mann, Anna Loos, Hans-Jochen Wagner, Jutta Wachowiak, Julia Koschitz	Drama	
Whiskey with Vodka	Andreas Dresen	Henry Hübchen, Corinna Harfouch	Comedy	
The White Ribbon	Michael Haneke	Christian Friedel, Burghart Klaußner, Ulrich Tukur, Susanne Lothar	Drama	German-Austrian co-production
Who's G.	Sharon von Wietersheim	Max Tidof, Elena Uhlig, Oliver Korittke, Fritz Karl	Comedy	a.k.a. Auf der Suche nach dem G.
Within the Whirlwind	Marleen Gorris	Emily Watson, Ulrich Tukur, Ian Hart	Drama	a.k.a. Journey into the Whirlwind a.k.a. Into the Whirlwind a.k.a. Stalin: Reign of Terror. German-Belgian-Polish co-production
Woche für Woche	Martin Gies	Tanja Wedhorn, Hans-Jochen Wagner	Drama	
Die zwei Leben des Daniel Shore	Michael Dreher	Nikolai Kinski	Drama	a.k.a. The Two Lives of Daniel Shore
