= 1969 in Germany =

- Decades: 1940s; 1950s; 1960s; 1970s; 1980s
- See also: Other events of 1969; History of Germany • Timeline • Years

Events in the year 1969 in Germany.

== Incumbents ==
- President
  - Heinrich Lübke (until 30 June 1969)
  - Gustav Heinemann (from 1 July 1969)
- Chancellor
  - Kurt Georg Kiesinger (until 21 October 1969)
  - Willy Brandt (from 21 October 1969)

== Events ==
- 22 February - Germany in the Eurovision Song Contest 1969
- 5 March - 1969 West German presidential election
- 23 June - Bonn Agreement
- 25 June - 26 July - 19th Berlin International Film Festival
- 5 September - Bielefeld University was established.
- 28 September - 1969 West German federal election
- 22 October - The First Brandt cabinet led by Willy Brandt was sworn in.

== Births ==
- January 3 – Michael Schumacher, racing driver
- January 15 – Meret Becker, actress
- January 24 – Annette Klug, fencer
- March 28 – Ilke Wyludda, discus thrower
- April 11 – Caren Miosga, journalist
- April 20 – Marietta Slomka, journalist
- May 14 – Sabine Schmitz, racing driver and television personality (died 2021)
- May 25 – Jörg Roßkopf, table tennis player
- June 14 – Steffi Graf, tennis player
- June 15 – Oliver Kahn, football player
- July 5 – Ansgar Brinkmann, politician
- July 10 – Jonas Kaufmann, opera singer
- July 16 – Sahra Wagenknecht, politician
- July 19 – Sabine Bau, fencer
- July 21 – Isabell Werth, equestrian
- July 22 – Ronny Weller, weightlifter
- August 3 – Ingo Oschmann, comedian
- August 21 – Oliver Geissen, television presenter
- August 28 – Christoph Ahlhaus, politician
- September 9 – Sandra Wagner-Sachse, archer
- October 1 – Thorsten Schäfer-Gümbel, politician
- October 10 – Torsten May, boxer
- October 19 – Dieter Thoma, ski jumper
- October 30 – Thomas Johannes Mayer, opera singer (died 2025)
- November 22 – Katrin Krabbe, athlete
- December 22 – Eyck Zimmer, chef
- December 25 – AnNa R., singer

== Deaths ==
- January 13 - Helmut Weiss, German film director (born 1907)
- February 18 - Gisela Arendt, German swimmer (born 1918)
- February 22 - Johannes Dieckmann, German politician (born 1893)
- February 26 - Karl Jaspers, German psychiatrist and philosopher (born 1883)
- March 7 - Wilhelm von Apell, German general (born 1892)
- April 21 - Rudolf Amelunxen, German politician (born 1888)
- May 2 - Franz von Papen, German politician, Chancellor of Germany (born 1879)
- July 5 - Walter Gropius, German architect (born 1883)
- July 25 - Otto Dix, German painter (born 1891)
- 5 August — Duke Adolf Friedrich of Mecklenburg, German nobleman, explorer and politician (born 1873)
- August 6 - Theodor W. Adorno, German philosopher (born 1903)
- August 8 - Otmar Freiherr von Verschuer, German physician (born 1896)
- August 17
  - Ludwig Mies van der Rohe, German architect (born 1886)
  - Otto Stern, German physicist and Nobel laureate in Physics (born 1888)
- September 12 - Robert Geritzmann, German politician (born 1893)
- September 20 - Eva Aschoff, German bookbinder and calligrapher (born 1900)
- October 22 - Fritz Steinhoff, German politician (born 1897)
- November 6 - Max Knoll, German electrical engineer (born 1897)
- November 25 - Hans Reiter, German physician (born 1881)
- December 2 - Otto Dix, German painter (born 1891)
- December 5 - Claude Dornier, German airplane builder (born 1884)
- December 8 - Karl Fiehler, German politician (born 1895)
- December 19 - Rolf Dahlgrün, German politician (born 1908)
- December 22 - Armin von Gerkan, German archaeologist (born 1885)

== See also ==
- 1969 in German television
