= 1967 in Germany =

- Decades: 1940s; 1950s; 1960s; 1970s; 1980s
- See also: Other events of 1967; History of Germany • Timeline • Years

Events in the year 1967 in Germany.

== Incumbents ==
- President – Heinrich Lübke
- Chancellor – Kurt Georg Kiesinger

== Events ==
- Germany in the Eurovision Song Contest 1967
- April 22 - The Free Socialist Party/Marxist-Leninists political party is founded.
- June 23 - July 4 - 17th Berlin International Film Festival
- July 2 - East German general election, 1967
- September 29 - The electronic music group Tangerine Dream was founded by Edgar Froese in West-Berlin.
- Date unknown - In 1967, a majority share of the German company Braun AG was acquired by the Boston, Massachusetts-based conglomerate Gillette Group.
- Date unknown - The first hydraulic breaker "Hydraulikhammer HM 400" was invented by German company Krupp.

== Births ==
- January 5 - Markus Söder, German politician
- January 20 - Wigald Boning, German actor, singer, writer and television presenter
- January 25 - Nicole Uphoff, German equestrian
- February 7 - Kurt Kleinschmidt, German politician
- February 15 - Jan Hecker, German lawyer and diplomat (died 2021)
- March 8 - Udo Quellmalz, German judoka
- March 20 - Stephan Kampwirth, German actress
- April 7 - Alex Christensen, German singer, DJ and composer
- April 20 - Ingo Appelt, German comedian
- April 25 – Georg Maier, German politician
- May 10 - Antje Harvey, German cross country skier and biathlete
- May 14 - Tillmann Uhrmacher, German DJ, musician and radio host (died 2011)
- May 15 - Andrea Jürgens, German singer (died 2017)
- May 23 - Wotan Wilke Möhring, German actor
- May 27 - Kai Pflaume, German television presenter
- June 4 - Marcus Weinberg, German politician
- June 16 - Jürgen Klopp, German football manager
- June 24
  - Michael Kessler, German actor and comedian
  - Richard Kruspe, German musician
- June 28 - Lars Riedel, German discus thrower
- June 30 - Silke Renk, German javelin thrower
- July 1 - Peter Plate, German singer
- July 11 - Berni Huber, German alpine skier
- July 28 - Jakob Augstein, German journalist
- August 25 - Eckart von Hirschhausen, German physician and television presenter
- September 5 - Matthias Sammer, German football player
- September 7 - Natalia Wörner, German actress
- September 21 - Vera Int-Veen, Gernab television presenter
- September 25 - Armin Baumgarten, German painter and sculptor
- September 28 - Steffen Zesner, German swimmer
- October 4 - Steffen Grosse, German politician
- October 10 - Bernhard Bauer, German alpine skier
- October 19 - Alexander Ebner, German social scientist and university professor
- October 27 - Natascha Kohnen, German politician
- October 28 - Martin Brambach, German actor
- November 22 - Boris Becker, German tennis player
- November 7 - Olaf Schubert, German comedian

== Deaths ==
- January 7 - Carl Schuricht, German conductor (born 1880)
- January 11 - Wolfgang Zeller, German composer (born 1893)
- January 29 - Marten von Barnekow, German equestrian (born 1900)
- January 31 - F. K. Otto Dibelius, German bishop of the Evangelical Church in Berlin-Brandenburg (born 1880)
- February 28 — Gerhard Roßbach, German Freikorps leader and paramilitary (born 1893)
- March 29 - Fritz Schäffer, German politician (born 1888)
- April 19 — Konrad Adenauer, German politician, former Chancellor of Germany (born 1876)
- May 9 — Oskar Hergt, German politician (born 1869)
- May 27 - Paul Henckels, German actor (born 1885)
- June 2 — Benno Ohnesorg, German student (born 1940)
- July 9 - Eugen Fischer, German physician (born 1874)
- July 21 - Thomas Dehler, German politician (born 1897)
- July 30 - Alfried Krupp von Bohlen und Halbach, German industrialist (born 1907)
- 28 August — Christian Stock, German politician (born 1884)
- 31 August - Trude Hesterberg, German actress (born 1892)
- 27 October - Theodor Steltzer, German politician (born 1885)
- 30 November - Josias, Hereditary Prince of Waldeck and Pyrmont (born 1896)
- 30 November - Heinz Tietjen, German conductor (born 1881)

== See also ==
- 1967 in German television
