= 1962 in Germany =

- Decades: 1940s; 1950s; 1960s; 1970s; 1980s
- See also: Other events of 1962; History of Germany; Timeline; Years

Events in the year 1962 in Germany.

== Incumbents ==
- President – Heinrich Lübke
- Chancellor – Konrad Adenauer

== Events ==
- 16-17 February - North Sea flood of 1962
- 2 February - Germany in the Eurovision Song Contest 1962
- 28 February – Oberhausen Manifesto
- 22 June – 3 July 12th Berlin International Film Festival
- 8 October – Spiegel affair begins, when an article in Der Spiegel questions the adequacy of Germany's defence capability.
- 25 November – The 1962 Bavarian state election took place. The Christian Social Union in Bavaria (CSU) achieved a majority under Minister-President Alfons Goppel.
- 14 December – The Fifth Adenauer cabinet, led by Konrad Adenauer, is sworn in.

== Births ==
- 5 January – Ralf Meister, German Lutheran theologian, former General Superintendent (regional bishop) of Berlin, and Landesbischof of the Evangelical-Lutheran Church of Hanover
- 9 January – André Wohllebe, German canoeist (died 2014)
- 19 January – Monika Grütters, German politician
- 31 January – Frank Wieneke, German judoka
- 8 February – Martin Wuttke, German actor
- 13 February – Christiane Weber, German fencer
- 25 February – Birgit Fischer, German kayaker
- 4 March – Stephan Reimertz, German historian and author
- 9 March – Rolf Saalfrank, German shot putter
- 10 March – Sepp Daxenberger, politician (died 2010)
- 12 March – Andreas Köpke, footballer
- 17 March – Rudi Spring, German composer (died 2025)
- 24 March – Irina Meszynski, German discus thrower
- 26 March – Susanne Daubner, German television presenter
- 1 April – Stefanie Tücking, German radio and television presenter (died 2018)
- 24 April – Heike Kemmer, equestrian
- 28 April – Susanne Klatten, German business woman
- 29 April – Stephan Burger, German bishop of Roman Catholic Church
- 18 May – Sandra, German singer
- 21 May – Uwe Rahn, German football player
- 31 May – Sebastian Koch, German actor
- 3 June – Dagmar Neubauer, German sprinter
- 10 June – Ralf Schumann, German sport shooter
- 22 June – Campino, German singer
- 24 June – Christine Neubauer, German actress
- 9 July – Jan Degenhardt, German lawyer and folk-singer
- 15 July – Jens Bullerjahn, German engineer and politician (died 2022)
- 21 July – Gabi Bauer, German journalist
- 28 July – Torsten Gütschow, German football player
- 9 August – Annegret Kramp-Karrenbauer, German politician
- 23 August – Jürgen Tonkel, German actor
- 30 September – Kathrin Schneider, German politician
- 9 October – Durs Grünbein, German poet
- 25 October – Martin Haase, German linguist
- 30 October – Stefan Kuntz, German football player
- 1 November – Ulf Timmermann, German athlete
- 6 November – Georg Uecker, German actor
- 28 November – Andreas Behm, German weightlifter
- 30 November – Heinrich Deichmann, German entrepreneur
- 1 December – Detlev Buck, German actor, film producer and screenwriter
- 5 December – Marion Kracht, German actress
- 14 December – Bela B., German singer and musician
- 31 December – Katy Karrenbauer, German actress

== Deaths ==
- 1 January – Hans von Salmuth, German general (born 1888)
- 7 February – Clara Nordström, Swedish-born German writer and translator (born 1886)
- 8 March – Hans Felber, Wehrmacht general and Knight's Cross recipient (born 1889)
- 5 April – Käte Selbmann, German politician (b. 1906)
- 11 May – Hans Luther, German politician, Chancellor of Germany (born 1879)
- 18 May – Sandra, singer
- 19 May – Gabriele Münter, German painter (born 1877)
- 26 May – Karl Rapp, German founder and owner of the Rapp Motorenwerke GmbH in Munich.(born 1882)
- 1 June – Adolf Eichmann, German Nazi SS-Obersturmbannführer (lieutenant colonel) (born 1906)
- 15 June – Wolrad, Prince of Schaumburg-Lippe, German nobleman (born 1887)
- 18 June – Friederich-Karl Burckhardt, German World War I flying ace (born 1889)
- 25 July – Helene Weber, German politician (born 1881)
- 9 August – Hermann Hesse, German writer (born 1877)
- 20 August – Kurt Schumacher, German politician (born 1895)
- 1 September – Hans-Jürgen von Arnim, German general (born 1889)
- 10 September – Rudolf Petersen, German politician (born 1878)
- 25 September – Herbert Koch, German archaeologist (born 1880)
- 21 October – Karl Elmendorff, German conductor (born 1891)
- 14 November – Wilhelm Lachnit, German painter (born 1899)
- 13 December – Rudolf Wissell, German politician (born 1869)

== See also ==
- 1962 in German television
