= 1973 in Germany =

- Decades: 1950s; 1960s; 1970s; 1980s; 1990s
- See also: Other events of 1973; History of Germany • Timeline • Years

Events in the year 1973 in Germany.

== Incumbents ==
- President – Gustav Heinemann
- Chancellor – Willy Brandt

== Events ==
- 21 February – Germany in the Eurovision Song Contest 1973
- 1 March – Launch of the Volkswagen Passat, a large family hatchback based on the front-wheel drive running gear of the Audi 80. It is similar in concept to the Renault 16 from France and also competes with traditional saloons like the Ford Taunus and Opel Ascona.
- 30 May – Chancellor Brandt is briefed on the espionage activities of his aide, Günter Guillaume.
- 22 June–3 July – 23rd Berlin International Film Festival
- 18 September – The two German Republics, the Federal Republic of Germany (West Germany) and the German Democratic Republic (East Germany), are admitted to the United Nations.
- 11 December – Treaty of Prague
- Date unknown: German company Gerry Weber was founded.

== Births ==
- 5 January – Robert Babicz, Polish-born music producer, mastering engineer, and live performer
- 26 January – Jörn Weisbrodt, German arts administrator
- 24 February – Philipp Rösler, politician and physician (official date)
- 8 April – Christof May, theologian and priest (died 2022)
- 22 April – Max Herre, singer
- 28 April – Elisabeth Röhm, actress
- 1 May – Mike Jesse, footballer
- 2 May – Florian Henckel von Donnersmarck, film director
- 20 May – Kaya Yanar, comedian
- 1 June – Heidi Klum, model, television host, businesswoman, fashion designer and television producer
- 22 June – Sonya Kraus, German television presenter and actress
- 23 June – Steffen Dittes, German politician
- 24 June – Alexander Beyer, actor
- 28 June – Andre Lange, German Olympic bobsledder
- 15 July - Yasemin Şamdereli, actress
- 14 August – Thyra von Westernhagen, German noblewoman and landowner
- 25 August – Fatih Akin, German film director, screenwriter and producer
- 29 August – Thomas Tuchel, German football player and manager
- 10 September – Deniz Yücel, German journalist
- 1 October – Devid Striesow, German actor
- 2 December – Jan Ullrich, German professional road bicycle racer
- 28 December – Marc Blume, German sprinter

== Deaths ==
- 2 February - Max Brauer, German politician (born 1887)
- 11 February - J. Hans D. Jensen, German nuclear physicist (born 1907)
- 10 March — Robert Siodmak, German film director (born 1900)
- 20 March — Adolf Strauss, German general (born 1879)
- 8 April — Viktor de Kowa, German actor and singer (born 1904)
- 7 May — Walter von Keudell, German politician (born 1884)
- 26 May — Karl Löwith, German philosopher (born 1897)
- 28 May – Hans Schmidt-Isserstedt, German conductor and composer (born 1900)
- 8 June – Emmy Göring, German actress (born 1893)
- 9 June – Erich von Manstein, German commander of the Wehrmacht (born 1887)
- 18 June — Theodor Krancke, Kriegsmarine admiral and Knight's Cross recipient (born 1893)
- 26 June — Hans Schlemmer, Wehrmacht general and Knight's Cross recipient (born 1893)
- 2 July – Ferdinand Schörner, German field marshal (born 1892)
- 7 July – Max Horkheimer, German philosopher and sociologist (born 1895)
- 13 July – Willy Fritsch, German actor (born 1901)
- 6 July – Otto Klemperer, German conductor (born 1885)
- 1 August – Walter Ulbricht, East German politician (born 1893)
- 12 August – Karl Ziegler (1898-1973), chemist, Nobel Prize in Chemistry laureate (born 1898)
- 15 September – Herbert Albert, German conductor (born 1903)
- 10 October — Hermann Reinecke, Wehrmacht general and convicted war criminal (born 1888)
- 6 December – Friedrich Panse, German psychiatrist (born 1899)
- 14 December – Josef Magnus Wehner, German poet and playwright (born 1891)

== See also ==
- 1973 in German television
