= 1974 in Germany =

- Decades: 1950s; 1960s; 1970s; 1980s; 1990s
- See also: Other events of 1974; History of Germany • Timeline • Years

Events in the year 1974 in Germany.

== Incumbents ==
- President
  - Gustav Heinemann (until 30 June 1974)
  - Walter Scheel (from 1 July 1974)
- Chancellor
  - Willy Brandt (until 7 May 1974)
  - Walter Scheel (Acting; 7–16 May 1974)
  - Helmut Schmidt (from 16 May 1974)

== Events ==
- Germany in the Eurovision Song Contest 1974
- 29 March - Launch of the Volkswagen Golf, a front-wheel drive hatchback which is planned to replace the Beetle.
- 2 April - Westfalenstadion is opened in Dortmund.
- 24 April - Guillaume Affair
- 16 May - The First Schmidt cabinet led by Helmut Schmidt was sworn in.
- 23 May - West German presidential election, 1974
- 13 June-7 July - 1974 FIFA World Cup, held in West Germany
- 21 June - 2 July - 24th Berlin International Film Festival
- 7 October - East German Republic Day Parade of 1974

== Births ==
- January 1 - Marco Schreyl, German television presenter
- January 4 - Danilo Hondo, German cyclist
- January 21 - Kim Dotcom, German-Finnish internet activist
- January 22 - Annette Frier, German comedian
- January 30 - Maren Eggert, German actress
- January 31 - Ralf Akoto, German judoka
- March 5 - Barbara Schöneberger, German actress and television presenter
- March 20 - Janine Kunze, German actress
- March 28 - Matthias Koeberlin, German actor
- March 21 - Klaus Lederer, German politician
- April 1 - Sandra Völker, German swimmer
- April 7 - Ronny Ostwald, German athlete
- May 23 - Manuela Schwesig, German politician
- June 6 - Dunja Hayali, German journalist
- June 9 - Benjamin Heisenberg, German film director
- April 1 - Sandra Völker, German swimmer
- July 14 - Martina Hill, actress, comedian and impersonator
- July 22 - Franka Potente, German actress
- July 28 - Axel Bernstein, German politician (died 2017)
- August 19 - Anja Knippel, German runner
- August 22 - Peter Tauber, German politician
- September 9 - Philipp Kadelbach, German film director
- September 17 - Bianca Shomburg, German singer
- September 25 - Timo Hoffmann, German boxer
- September 26 - Andreas Scheuer, German politician
- October 29 - Hansjörg Schmidt, German politician
- November 9 - Sven Hannawald, German ski jumper
- November 9 - Kurt Krömer, German comedian and television presenter
- December 4 - Manuela Henkel, German cross-country skier

== Deaths ==
- January 26 - Johanna Langefeld, German guard, supervisor of three Nazi concentration camps (born 1900)
- January 27 - Leo Geyr von Schweppenburg, German general (born 1886)
- February 13 - Adolf Arndt, German politician (born 1904)
- February 24 - Robert A. Stemmle, German film director and screenwriter (born 1903)
- April 20 - Richard Huelsenbeck, German poet and writer (born 1892)
- May 24 - Konrad Frey, German gymnast (born 1909)
- June 24 - Gero Wecker, German film producer (born 1923)
- July 29 - Erich Kästner, German author, poet, screenwriter and satirist (born 1899)
- August 14 — Arnulf Klett, German lawyer and politician (born 1905)
- October 10 - Marie Luise Kaschnitz, German writer (born 1901)
- October 27- Rudolf Dassler, German founder of the sportswear company Puma (born 1898)
- November 9 — Holger Meins, German cinematography student (born 1941)
- November 16 - Walther Meissner, German physicist (born 1882)
- December 3 - Hans Leibelt, German film actress (born 1885)
- December 14 — Kurt Hahn, German educator (born 1886)
- December 19 — Bernd von Brauchitsch, German air force officer (born 1911)

== See also ==
- 1974 in German television
