= 1972 in Germany =

- Decades: 1950s; 1960s; 1970s; 1980s; 1990s
- See also: Other events of 1972; History of Germany • Timeline • Years

Events in the year 1972 in Germany.

== Incumbents ==
- President – Gustav Heinemann
- Chancellor – Willy Brandt

== Events ==
- 19 February – Germany in the Eurovision Song Contest 1972
- 1 April – German company SAP SE is founded.
- 19 May – Three out of six bombs explode in the Axel Springer AG media company offices in Hamburg, injuring 17; the Red Army Faction claims responsibility.
- 24 May – A Red Army Faction bomb explodes in the Campbell Barracks of the U.S. Army Supreme European Command in Heidelberg, West Germany; three U.S. soldiers (Clyde Bonner, Ronald Woodard and Charles Peck) are killed.
- 2 June – Andreas Baader, Jan-Carl Raspe, Holger Meins and some other members of the Red Army Faction are arrested in Frankfurt am Main, after a shootout.
- 15 June – Ulrike Meinhof and Gerhard Müller of the Red Army Faction are arrested in a teacher's apartment in Langenhagen, West Germany.
- 23 June - 4 July – 22nd Berlin International Film Festival
- 30 June - 8 October – documenta 5
- 14 August – 1972 Königs Wusterhausen air disaster
- 26 August–10 September – 1972 Summer Olympics in Munich.
- 5 September – Munich massacre: Members of the Palestinian terrorist group Black September kill two members of the Israeli Olympic team and take another nine hostage.
- 29 October – Lufthansa Flight 615 is hijacked and threats are made to be blown up if the three surviving perpetrators of the Munich massacre are not released from prison in West Germany. The demands are accepted, leading to fierce condemnation by Israel.
- 19 November – West German federal election, 1972
- 15 December – The Second Brandt cabinet led by Willy Brandt was sworn in.
- 21 December – The Basic Treaty is signed by Federal Republic of Germany and German Democratic Republic.
- Transit Agreement
- Date unknown
  - German company Fielmann is founded.
  - German company SAP AG is founded.
  - Kadir Nurman introduces a sandwich made with döner kebab meat as a fast-food item in Berlin.

== Births ==
- 2 January – Britt Hagedorn, German television presenter
- 15 February – Michelle, German singer
- 22 February – Claudia Pechstein, German speedskater
- 10 March – Mark Waschke, German actor
- 1 April – Björn Höcke, (AfD) German politician
- 4 April – Bastian Pastewka, German actor and comedian
- 9 April – Bernard Ackah, German-Ivorian mixed martial artist and comedian
- 16 April – Andreas Dittmer, German canoeist
- 10 May – Katja Seizinger, German alpine ski racer
- 23 May – Nadja Uhl, German actress
- 14 June – Matthias Ettrich, German computer scientist
- 20 June – Simon Verhoeven, German actor and film director
- 22 June – Michael Wendler, German singer
- 1 July – Steffi Nerius, German athlete
- 10 July – Christoph Hochhäusler, German film director
- 3 September – Tim Lobinger, German pole vaulter
- 18 October – Helge Braun, German politician
- 1 November – Mario Barth, German comedian
- 3 November – Hubertus Heil, German politician
- 4 December – Marc Bator, German journalist
- 16 December – Julia Klöckner, German politician
- 28 December – Florian Pronold, German politician

== Deaths ==
- 6 January - Walther von Axthelm, German general (born 1893)
- 25 January - Erhard Milch, German field marshal of Luftwaffe (born 1892)
- 20 February — Maria Goeppert-Mayer, Germann theoretical physicist, and Nobel laureate in Physics (born 1906)
- 27 March — Raimund Schelcher, German actor (born 1910)
- 6 April — Heinrich Lübke, German politician, former President of Germany (born 1894)
- 26 April — Johann Reichhart, German executioner (born 1893)
- 14 May - Theodor Blank, German politician (born 1905)
- 23 June — Werner Klingler, German film director and actor (born 1903)
- 25 June - Günther Simon, German actor (born 1925)
- 2 July — Eduard Zuckmayer, German writer and playwright (born 1890)
- 20 July — Friedrich Flick, German entrepreneur and industrialist (born 1883)
- 1 August - Erwin Madelung, German physicist (born 1881)
- 21 August – Heinz Ziegler, German general (born 1894)
- 29 August — Lale Andersen, German singer (born 1905)
- 29 September - Max Nosseck, German film director (born 1902)
- 4 October — Karl Theodor Freiherr von und zu Guttenberg, German politician (born 1921)
- 25 November - Hans Scharoun, German architect (born 1893)
- 9 December - William Dieterle, German actor and film director (born 1893)
- 20 December - Günter Eich, German author (born 1907)
- 24 December - Ernst Kreuder, German writer (born 1903)

== See also ==
- 1972 in German television
