= 1970 in German television =

This is a list of German television related events from 1970.

== Events ==
- 16 February - Katja Ebstein is selected to represent Germany at the 1970 Eurovision Song Contest with her song "Wunder gibt es immer wieder". She is selected to be the fifteenth German Eurovision entry during Ein Lied für Amsterdam held at the HR Studios in Frankfurt.

== Debuts ==
=== ARD ===
- 4 January – Like a Tear in the Ocean (1970)
- 18 January – Die Berufe des Herrn K (1970)
- 5 February – Die Baumwollpflücker (1970)
- 10 March – Die Reiter von Padola (1970)
- 30 March – Tage der Rache (1970)
- 9 April – Wie ein Blitz (1970)
- 4 September – Die Kriminalnovelle (1970)
- 23 September – Der Fall von nebenan (1970–1975)
- 28 September – Drei im Morgenland (1970)
- 30 September – Recht oder Unrecht (1970)
- 2 October – Toni und Veronika (1970–1971)
- 6 November – Merkwürdige Geschichten (1970–1971)
- 29 November – Tatort (1970–Present)
- 30 November – Der schwarze Graf (1970–1973)
- 30 December – Drüben bei Lehmanns (1970–1973)
- 31 December – Hamburg Transit (1970–1974)

=== ZDF ===
- 8 January – 11 Uhr 20 (1970)
- 20 March – Maximilian von Mexiko (1970)
- 2 April – Miss Molly Mill (1970)
- 3 April – Meine Tochter - Unser Fräulein Doktor (1970)
- 28 April – Mensch bleiben, sagt Tegtmeier (1970)
- 10 July – Ehen vor Gericht (1970–1984)
- 13 September – Hauptbahnhof München (1970)
- 28 September – Der Kurier der Kaiserin (1970–1971)
- 6 October – Bäng Bäng (1970–1971)

=== DFF ===
- 13 February – Botschafter morden nicht (1970)
- 13 April – Die Flamme (1970)
- 28 August – Denn ich sah eine neue Erde (1970)
- 12 September – Jeder stirbt für sich allein (1970)
- 15 December – Zollfahndung (1970–1971)

== Television shows ==
=== 1950s ===
- Tagesschau (1952–present)

=== 1960s ===
- heute (1963-present)

== Ending this year ==
- Polizeifunk ruft (since 1966)

== Births ==
- 25 August - Matthias Opdenhövel, journalist & TV host
