= 1889 in Germany =

- Decades: 1860s; 1870s; 1880s; 1890s; 1900s
- See also: Other events of 1889; History of Germany • Timeline • Years

Events in the year 1889 in Germany.

== Incumbents ==
=== National level ===
- Emperor – Wilhelm II
- Chancellor – Otto von Bismarck

=== State level ===
==== Kingdoms ====
- King of Bavaria – Otto
- King of Prussia – Wilhelm II
- King of Saxony – Albert
- King of Württemberg – Charles

==== Grand Duchies ====
- Grand Duke of Baden – Frederick I
- Grand Duke of Hesse – Louis IV
- Grand Duke of Mecklenburg-Schwerin – Frederick Francis III
- Grand Duke of Mecklenburg-Strelitz – Frederick William
- Grand Duke of Oldenburg – Peter II
- Grand Duke of Saxe-Weimar-Eisenach – Charles Alexander

==== Principalities ====
- Schaumburg-Lippe – Adolf I, Prince of Schaumburg-Lippe
- Schwarzburg-Rudolstadt – George Albert, Prince of Schwarzburg-Rudolstadt
- Schwarzburg-Sondershausen – Karl Günther, Prince of Schwarzburg-Sondershausen
- Principality of Lippe – Woldemar, Prince of Lippe
- Reuss Elder Line – Heinrich XXII, Prince Reuss of Greiz
- Reuss Younger Line – Heinrich XIV, Prince Reuss Younger Line
- Waldeck and Pyrmont – George Victor, Prince of Waldeck and Pyrmont

==== Duchies ====
- Duke of Anhalt – Frederick I, Duke of Anhalt
- Duke of Brunswick – Prince Albert of Prussia (regent)
- Duke of Saxe-Altenburg – Ernst I, Duke of Saxe-Altenburg
- Duke of Saxe-Coburg and Gotha – Ernst II, Duke of Saxe-Coburg and Gotha
- Duke of Saxe-Meiningen – Georg II, Duke of Saxe-Meiningen

==== Colonial Governors ====
- Cameroon (Kamerun) – Julius Freiherr von Soden (2nd term) to 26 December, then Eugen von Zimmerer (acting governor) (2nd term)
- German East Africa (Deutsch-Ostafrika) – Hermann Wissmann (commissioner) (1st term)
- German New Guinea (Deutsch-Neuguinea) – Reinhold Kraetke (Landeshauptleute of the German New Guinea Company) to 31 October, then Fritz Rose (acting commissioner) from 1 November
- German South-West Africa (Deutsch-Südwestafrika) – Heinrich Ernst Göring (acting commissioner)
- Togoland – Eugen von Zimmerer (commissioner)
- Wituland (Deutsch-Witu) – Gustav Denhardt (resident)

== Events ==
- 13 April – German company Rheinmetall was founded.
- 14 June – Treaty of Berlin over Samoa
- 3 October – German company K+S was founded.

=== Undated ===
- Old Age and Disability Insurance Bill of 1889

== Births ==
- 8 January – Paul Hartmann, German actor (died 1977)
- 22 January – Willi Baumeister, German painter, scenic designer, professor of art and typographer (died 1955)
- 1 February – Rudolf Bauer, German-American painter (died 1953)
- 8 February – Siegfried Kracauer, German author, journalist, sociologist and (died 1966)
- 3 March – Carl Vincent Krogmann, German banker and politician (died 1978)
- 19 April – Otto Georg Thierack, German politician and jurist (died 1946)
- 20 April – Adolf Hitler, German Führer and politician (died 1945)
- 12 May – Otto Frank, German businessman (died 1980)
- 23 May – Erich Engels, German screenwriter, producer and film director (died 1971)
- 25 May – Günther Lütjens, German general (died 1941)
- 11 June – Otto Dessloch, German Luftwaffe general and Knight's Cross recipient (died 1977)
- 8 July – Hans Felber, German infantry general and Knight's Cross recipient (died 1962)
- 20 July – Erich Pommer, German film producer and executive (died 1966)
- 27 July – Hans von Opel, German industrialist (died 1948)
- 29 July – Ernst Reuter, German politician (died 1953)
- 21 September – Annemarie Steinsieck, German actress (died 1977)
- 26 September – Martin Heidegger, German philosopher (died 1976)
- 3 October – Carl von Ossietzky, German journalist and pacifist (died 1938)
- 7 October:
  - Erich Büttner, German painter (died 1936)
  - Hans Tropsch, German chemist (died 1935)
- 16 October – Reinhold Maier, German politician (died 1971)
- November 1 – Hannah Höch, German artist (died 1978)
- 29 November – Margarete Haagen, German actress (died 1966)
- 30 November – Hans Bischoff – German entomologist (died 1960)
- 24 December – Friedrich-Karl Burckhardt, World War I German flying ace (died 1962)

== Deaths ==
- 19 January – Alexander von Monts, German admiral (born 1832)
- 14 March – Friedrich Theodor von Frerichs, German pathologist (born 1819)
- 26 March – C.F. Theodore Steinway, German piano maker (born 1825)
- 5 August – Fanny Lewald, poet and actor (born 1811)
- 21 December – Friedrich August von Quenstedt, geologist (born 1809)
- 26 December – Hermann von Thile, diplomat (born 1812)
- 27 December – Ernst Christian Friedrich Schering, apothecary and industrialist (born 1824)
