= 1968 in Germany =

- Decades: 1940s; 1950s; 1960s; 1970s; 1980s
- See also: Other events of 1968; History of Germany • Timeline • Years

Events in the year 1968 in Germany.

== Incumbents ==
- President – Heinrich Lübke
- Chancellor – Kurt Georg Kiesinger

== Events ==
- Germany in the Eurovision Song Contest 1968
- May 30 - German Emergency Acts
- June 21 - July 2 - 18th Berlin International Film Festival
- June 27-October 4 - 4. documenta
- Neue Nationalgalerie opened in Berlin.

== Births ==
- January 2 – Matthias Berger, German politician
- January 11 – Benjamin List, German organic chemist, recipient of Nobel Prize in Chemistry
- February 27 - Samuel Kummer, German organist (died 2024)
- March 6 - Smudo, German singer
- April 6 - Oliver Korittke, German actor
- April 8 - Gabriele Fähnrich, German gymnast
- April 20 - Jens Weidmann, German economist, president of the Deutsche Bundesbank, and Chairman of the Board of the Bank for International Settlements
- April 21 - Tita von Hardenberg, German journalist and television presenter
- April 25 - Thomas Strunz, German football player
- April 29 - Michael Herbig, German film actor and director
- April 29 - Jürgen Vogel, German actor
- May 1 - Oliver Bierhoff, German football player
- May 2 - August François von Finck, German businessman
- May 5 - Peter Frank, German lawyer
- May 9 - Hardy Krüger Jr., German actor
- May 19 - Sonja Zietlow, German television presenter
- June 8 - Torsten Gutsche, German canoeist
- June 29 - Tilo Kummer, German politician
- July 16 - Marcel Machill, German journalist
- August 2 - Stefan Effenberg, German football player
- August 17 - Anja Fichtel, German fencer
- August 31 – Alexander Haugg, German actor
- September 11 - Andreas Tews, German boxer
- September 23 - Gabriele Reinsch, German athlete
- September 29 - Svenja Schulze, German politician
- October 13 - Kay Bluhm, German canoeist
- October 18 - Michael Stich, German tennis player
- November 19
  - Katarina Barley, German politician
  - Anja Vanrobaeys, Belgian politician
- November 21 - Inka Bause, German actress, singer and television presenter
- November 24 - Martin Schneider, German footballer
- December 18 - Mario Basler, German footballer
- December 30 - Thomas D, German singer

== Deaths ==
- January 2 - Cuno Hoffmeister, German astronomer (born 1892)
- February 23 - Emil Hirschfeld, German athlete (born 1903)
- February 28 - Hans Lohmeyer, German politician and jurist (born 1881)
- April 16 — Albert Betz, German physicist and a pioneer of wind turbine technology (born 1885)
- May 25 - Georg von Küchler, German field marshal (born 1881)
- May 30 - Louis, Prince of Hesse and by Rhine (born 1908)
- June 18 - Nikolaus von Falkenhorst, German general (born 1885)
- June 23 — Andreas von Aulock, Imperial Army officer and Wehrmacht general (born 1893)
- July 1 - Fritz Bauer, German judge (born 1903)
- July 19 - Käthe Kruse notable pioneer of German doll-making (born 1883)
- July 20 - Joseph Keilberth, German conductor (born 1908)
- July 28 - Otto Hahn, German chemist (born 1879)
- December 16 - Jürgen Moll, German football player (born 1939)
