= Saalfrank =

Saalfrank is a surname. Notable people with the surname include:

- Andrew Saalfrank (born 1997), American baseball player
- Rolf Saalfrank (born 1962), German shot putter
