= 1971 in Germany =

- Decades: 1950s; 1960s; 1970s; 1980s; 1990s
- See also: Other events of 1971; History of Germany; Timeline; Years

Events in the year 1971 in Germany.

== Incumbents ==
- President – Gustav Heinemann
- Chancellor – Willy Brandt

== Events ==
- 27 February – Germany in the Eurovision Song Contest 1971
- 14 March – West Berlin state election, 1971
- 21 March – Rhineland-Palatinate state election, 1971
- 27 May – Dahlerau train disaster
- 6 June – We've had abortions! in magazine Stern
- 26 June-July 6 - 21st Berlin International Film Festival
- 3 September – Four Power Agreement on Berlin
- 14 November – East German general election, 1971
- Date unknown
  - University of Bremen is founded.
  - University of Kassel is founded.
  - Dalli, Dalli by Hans Rosenthal is first broadcast, on ZDF.

== Births ==
- 3 January – Tarek Al-Wazir, German politician
- 8 January – Mike Süsser, German chef and author
- 26 January
  - Hubert Aiwanger, German politician (d. 2026)
  - Rick Kavanian, German actor, comedian and author
- 29 January – Jörg Albertz, German footballer
- 19 March – Nadja Auermann, German model
- 11 April – Oliver Riedel, German musician
- 29 April – Anja Karliczek, German politician
- 13 August
  - Moritz Bleibtreu, German actor
  - Heike Makatsch, German actress
- 23 July – Cornelia Pfohl, German archer
- 19 August – Guido Cantz, German television presenter
- 3 September – Mirja Boes, German comedian and actress
- 2 October – Xavier Naidoo, German singer
- 18 October – Jan Wagner, German writer
- 19 October – David Wagner, German soccer player and manager
- 30 October – Fredi Bobic, German football player
- 10 November – Nina Kunzendorf, German actress
- 18 November
  - Ilka Bessin, German comedian
  - Oliver Ruhnert, German politician and football manager
- 5 December – Karl-Theodor zu Guttenberg, German politician
- 24 December – Katrin Lange, German politician
- 30 December – Manuela Schmermund, German Paralympic sport shooter

=== Full date unknown ===
- Martin Klimas, photographer

== Deaths ==
- 14 January – Heinrich Anacker, German author (born 1901)
- 25 January – Hermann Hoth, German general (born 1885)
- 25 April – Erich Engels, German screenwriter, producer and film director (born 1889)
- 11 May – Hans Carste, German composer and conductor (born 1909)
- 6 May – Helene Weigel, German actress (born 1900)
- 13 May – Hubert von Meyerinck, German actor (born 1896)
- 3 June – Heinz Hopf, German mathematician (born 1894)
- 21 June – Ludwig Schmidseder, German composer (born 1904)
- 26 June – Johannes Frießner, German general (born 1892)
- 7 August – Günther Rittau, German film director (born 1893)
- 17 August – Wilhelm List, German field marshal (b. 1880)
- 1 November
  - Walther Kittel, Wehrmacht general (born 1887)
  - Gertrud von Le Fort, German writer of novels, poems and essays (born 1876)
- 14 November – Paul Klinger, German actor (born 1907)
- 10 December – Gotthard Heinrici, German general (born 1886)
- 11 December – Gustav Ehrhart, German chemist (born 1894)
