= 1887 in Germany =

- Decades: 1860s; 1870s; 1880s; 1890s; 1900s
- See also: Other events of 1887; History of Germany • Timeline • Years

Events in the year 1887 in Germany.

== Incumbents ==
=== National level ===
- Emperor – William I
- Chancellor – Otto von Bismarck

=== State level ===
==== Kingdoms ====
- King of Bavaria – Otto
- King of Prussia – William I
- King of Saxony – Albert
- King of Württemberg – Charles

==== Grand Duchies ====
- Grand Duke of Baden – Frederick I
- Grand Duke of Hesse – Louis IV
- Grand Duke of Mecklenburg-Schwerin – Frederick Francis II
- Grand Duke of Mecklenburg-Strelitz – Frederick William
- Grand Duke of Oldenburg – Peter II
- Grand Duke of Saxe-Weimar-Eisenach – Charles Alexander

==== Principalities ====
- Schaumburg-Lippe – Adolf I, Prince of Schaumburg-Lippe
- Schwarzburg-Rudolstadt – George Albert, Prince of Schwarzburg-Rudolstadt
- Schwarzburg-Sondershausen – Charles Gonthier, Prince of Schwarzburg-Sondershausen
- Principality of Lippe – Woldemar, Prince of Lippe
- Reuss Elder Line – Heinrich XXII, Prince Reuss of Greiz
- Reuss Younger Line – Heinrich XIV, Prince Reuss Younger Line
- Waldeck and Pyrmont – George Victor, Prince of Waldeck and Pyrmont

==== Duchies ====
- Duke of Anhalt – Frederick I, Duke of Anhalt
- Duke of Brunswick – Prince Albert of Prussia (regent)
- Duke of Saxe-Altenburg – Ernst I, Duke of Saxe-Altenburg
- Duke of Saxe-Coburg and Gotha – Ernst II, Duke of Saxe-Coburg and Gotha
- Duke of Saxe-Meiningen – Georg II, Duke of Saxe-Meiningen

==== Colonial Governors ====
- Cameroon (Kamerun) – Julius Freiherr von Soden (1st term) to 13 May, then Jesko von Puttkamer (1st term) to 4 October, then Eugen von Zimmerer (1st term)
- German East Africa (Deutsch-Ostafrika) – Karl Peters (administrator)
- German New Guinea (Deutsch-Neuguinea) – Gustav von Oertzen (commissioner) to January; also Georg Freiherr von Schleinitz (Landeshauptleute of the German New Guinea Company)
- German South-West Africa (Deutsch-Südwestafrika) – Heinrich Ernst Göring (acting commissioner)
- Togoland – Ernst Falkenthal (commissioner) to May, then from July Jesko von Puttkamer (acting commissioner) (1st term)
- Wituland (Deutsch-Witu) – Gustav Denhardt (resident)

== Events ==
- 21 February – German federal election, 1887
- 18 June – Reinsurance Treaty in Berlin
- 29 September – Football club Hamburger SV was founded.

=== Undated ===
- The Petri dish is created by German bacteriologist Julius Richard Petri.
- Heinrich Hertz discovers the photoelectric effect on the production and reception of electromagnetic waves in radio, an important step towards the understanding of the quantum nature of light.
- Adolf Gaston Eugen Fick invents the contact lens, made of a type of brown glass.
- Physikalisch-Technische Reichsanstalt is founded.
- Friedrich Loeffler creates Löffler's serum, a coagulated blood serum used for the detection of the bacteria.

== Births ==
- 1 January – Wilhelm Canaris, German Imperial admiral and head of the German Abwehr (died 1945)
- 3 January – August Macke, German painter (died 1914)
- 7 January – Thomas Wimmer, German politician (died 1964)
- 29 January – Prince August Wilhelm of Prussia, German nobleman (died 1949)
- 6 February – Josef Frings, German cardinal of Roman Catholic Church (died 1978)
- 8 February – Heinrich Spoerl, German author (died 1955)
- 20 March – Walther Kittel, Wehrmacht general (died 1971) in Metz, modern-day France
- 21 March – Erich Mendelsohn, German architect (died 1953)
- 2 April – Louise Schroeder, German politician (died 1957)
- 19 April – Wolrad, Prince of Schaumburg-Lippe, German nobleman (died 1962)
- 2 June – Gottlieb Hering, Nazi concentration camp commandant (died in 1945)
- 13 June – Bruno Frank, German author, poet, dramatist and humanist (died 1945)
- 20 June – Kurt Schwitters, German artist (died 1958)
- 23 June – Ernst Rowohlt, German publisher (died 1960)
- 22 July – Gustav Ludwig Hertz, physicist, Nobel Prize laureate (died 1975)
- 25 July – Carl Freiherr von Langen, German equestrian (died 1934)
- 8 August – Gertrud Morgner, German politician (died 1978)
- 9 August – Hans Oster, German general in the Wehrmacht of Nazi Germany who was also a leading figure of the German resistance (died 1945)
- 22 August – Lutz Graf Schwerin von Krosigk, German politician (died 1977)
- 3 September – Max Brauer, German politician (died 1973)
- 22 September – Hans Schlossberger, German physician (died 1960)
- 23 September – Wilhelm Hoegner, German politician (died 1980)
- 10 November – Hans Ehard, German politician (died 1980)
- 11 November – Walther Wever, German general, pre-World War II Luftwaffe commander (died 1936)
- 24 November – Erich von Manstein, German commander of the Wehrmacht,(died 1973)
- 6 December – Heinrich von Vietinghoff, German general (died 1952)
- 28 December – Walter Ruttmann, German director (died 1941)

== Deaths ==
- 17 July – Walther Otto Müller, German botanist (born 1833)
- 14 August – Adolf Pansch, German anatomist (born 1841)
- 29 September – Bernhard von Langenbeck, German surgeon (born 1819)
- 17 October – Gustav Kirchhoff, German physicist (born 1824)
