= 1971 in German television =

This is a list of German television related events from 1971.

== Events ==
- 3 April – West German's entrant Katja Ebstein finishes third at the Eurovision Song Contest 1971 in Dublin.

== Debuts ==
=== ARD ===
- 24 January – The German Lesson (1971)
- 7 March – Die Sendung mit der Maus (1971–Present)
- 16 May – The Woman in White (1971)
- 18 July – Operation Walküre (1971)
- 11 September – The New Adventures of Vidocq (1971–1973)
- 30 November – Das Messer (1971)
- 25 December – Peer Gynt (1971)

=== ZDF ===
- 13 January – Diamantendetektiv Dick Donald (1971)
- 13 February - Disco (1971–1982)
- 21 February – Tingeltangel (1971)
- 27 April – Quentin Durward (1971)
- 13 August – Gestrickte Spuren (1971)
- 17 September – The Eddie Chapman Story (1971, TV film)
- 31 October – Narrenspiegel (1971)
- 5 December – Der Seewolf (1971)

=== DFF ===
- 8 January – Rottenknechte (1971)
- 27 June – Polizeiruf 110 (1971–Present)
- 13 August – Tod eines Millionärs (1971)
- 11 September – Die Verschworenen (1971)
- 17 October – Verwandte und Bekannte (1971)

== Ending this year ==
- Königlich Bayerisches Amtsgericht (since 1969)
- Der Kurier der Kaiserin (since 1970)
- Die Unverbesserlichen (since 1965)
