= Bonn Agreement =

Bonn Agreement could refer to

- Bonn Agreement (Afghanistan)
- Bonn Agreement (1969)
- Bonn Agreement (religion)

== See also ==
- Bonn Convention
