= 1976 in Germany =

- Decades: 1950s; 1960s; 1970s; 1980s; 1990s
- See also: Other events of 1976; History of Germany • Timeline • Years

Events in the year 1976 in Germany.

== Incumbents ==
=== West Germany ===
- President – Walter Scheel
- Chancellor – Helmut Schmidt

=== East Germany ===
- Head of State – Willi Stoph (until October 29), Erich Honecker (starting October 29)
- Head of Government – Horst Sindermann (until October 29), Willi Stoph (starting October 29)

== Events ==
- January 2-5 – Gale of January 1976: storm and storm floods in Belgium, UK and Germany
- February 1 – Germany in the Eurovision Song Contest 1976
- June 25 – July 6 – 26th Berlin International Film Festival
- July 1 – Mitbestimmungsgesetz
- October 3 – West German federal election, 1976
- October 17 – East German general election, 1976
- December 16 – The Second Schmidt cabinet was sworn in. It is again a Social–liberal coalition (SPD/FDP) led by Helmut Schmidt (SPD).

== Births ==
- January 6 – Judith Rakers, German journalist
- January 9 – Simon Gosejohann, German comedian and television presenter
- January 21 – Alexander Bommes, German handball player and journalist
- January 21 – Kerstin Kowalski, German rower
- March 12 – Andreas Erm, German race walker
- April 6 – Anke Rehlinger, German politician
- April 11 – Ruth Moschner, German television presenter
- April 25 – Rainer Schüttler, German tennis player
- April 29 – Stephanie Aeffner, German politician (died 2025)
- May 3 – Alexander Gerst, German astronaut
- May 25 – Sandra Nasić, German singer
- June 10 – Georg Friedrich, Prince of Prussia, German nobleman
- June 12 – Katja Husen, German biologist and politician (died 2022)
- June 19 – Abdoul Thiam, German footballer
- June 30 – Christine Schürrer, German serial killer
- July 10 – Lars Ricken, German football player
- July 15 – Diane Kruger, German actress
- July 20 – Florian Panzner, German actor
- August 4 – Manja Schüle, German politician
- September 26 – Michael Ballack, German football player
- November 2 – Mike Leon Grosch, German singer
- November 12 – Judith Holofernes, German singer
- December 8 – Dominic Monaghan, German-born British actor

== Deaths ==
- January 18 – Friedrich Hollaender, German film composer and author (born 1896)
- February 1 – Werner Heisenberg, German physicist (born 1901)
- February 1 – Hans Richter, German painter and graphic artist (born 1888)
- February 11 – Alexander Lippisch, German aeronautical engineer, a pioneer of aerodynamics (born 1894)
- February 14 – Gertrud Dorka, German archaeologist, prehistorian and museum director (born 1893)
- February 25 – Paul May, German film director (born 1909)
- March 27 – Georg August Zinn, German politician (born 1901)
- April 1 – Max Ernst, German painter (born 1891)
- April 13 – Traugott Herr, German general (born 1890)
- May 9 — Ulrike Meinhof, German terrorist (born 1934)
- May 12 – Rudolf Kempe, German conductor (born 1910)
- May 26 – Martin Heidegger, German philosopher (born 1889)
- June 18 – Karl Adam, German rowing coach (born 1912)
- July 1 – Anneliese Michel, German woman (born 1952)
- July 5 – Anna Hübler, German pair skater (born 1885)
- July 7 – Gustav Heinemann, German politician, former President of Germany (born 1899)
- July 24 – Julius Döpfner, German cardinal of Roman Catholic Church (born 1913)
- July 30 – Rudolf Bultmann, German Lutheran theologian and professor of New Testament at the University of Marburg (born 1884)
- August 10 – Paul Lücke, German politician (born 1914)
- September 9 – Gottlob Bauknecht, German businessman (born 1892)
- August 10 – Karl Schmidt-Rottluff, German painter (born 1884)
- October 3 – Hermann Pünder, German politician (born 1888)
- October 18 – Paul Schmidt, German engineer (born 1898)
- October 21 – Theodor Koch, German engineer and weapons manufacturer (born 1905)
- November 8 – Gottfried von Cramm, German tennis player (born 1909)
- November 30 – Fritz Rasp, German actor (born 1891)
- November 30 – Armin Zimmermann, German admiral (born 1917)
- 14 – Friedrich Foertsch, German general (born 1900)

=== Date unknown ===
- Alice von Pechmann, German interior decorator (born 1882)

== See also ==
- 1976 in German television
