= 1977 in Germany =

- Decades: 1950s; 1960s; 1970s; 1980s; 1990s
- See also: Other events of 1977; History of Germany • Timeline • Years

Events in the year 1977 in Germany.

== Incumbents ==
- President – Walter Scheel
- Chancellor – Helmut Schmidt

== Events ==
- 1 January - the city of Lahn, Hesse is formed out of the cities of Giessen, Wetzlar and 14 other Central Hessian municipalities
- Germany in the Eurovision Song Contest 1977
- 24 June-2 October: documenta 6
- 24 June - 5 July - 27th Berlin International Film Festival
- 5 September-18 October: Kidnapping and murder of Hanns-Martin Schleyer
- 13 October - Lufthansa Flight 181 was hijacked by four members of the Popular Front for the Liberation of Palestine,
- German Autumn
- East German coffee crisis

== Births ==
- January 15 - Ronald Zehrfeld, German actor
- February 16 - Thomas Rupprath, German swimmer
- February 22 - Jessica Wahls, German pop singer
- February 22
  - Claudia Hiersche, German actress
  - Timo Rose, German actor, director, and producer
- March 4 - Daniel Klewer, German footballer
- March 7 - Mitja Zastrow, German-born Dutch swimmer
- April 2 - Michael fassbender, German and Irish actor
- May 2 - Jan Fitschen, German athlete
- May 3 - Nicola Thost, German snowboarder
- May 5 - Jessica Schwarz, German actress
- May 30 - Katharina Slanina, German politician
- July 18 - Martin Kohlmann, German politician
- July 21 - Danny Ecker, German pole vaulter
- August 2 - Florian Stetter, German actor
- August 3 - Kristina Schröder, German politician
- August 29 - Jo Weil, German actor
- October 16 - Björn Otto, German pole vaulter
- November 18 – Arne Landgraf, German rower
- November 28 - Claus von Wagner, German comedian and cabaret performer
- December 19 - Samy Deluxe, German singer

== Deaths ==
- January 6 - Hanns Lilje, Lutheran bishop (born 1899)
- January 18 - Carl Zuckmayer, German writer and playwright (born 1896)
- February 22 - Otto Graf, German actor (born 1896)
- March 4 - Lutz Graf Schwerin von Krosigk, German politician (born 1887)
- April 7 Karl Ritter, German film producer (born 1888)
- April 7 - Siegfried Buback, Attorney General of Germany (born 1920)
- May 5 - Ludwig Erhard, politician (born 1897)
- May 5 - Erich Campe, German boxer (born 1912)
- May 13 — Otto Deßloch, German Luftwaffe general and Knight's Cross recipient (born 1889)
- June 16 - Wernher von Braun, German, later American, aerospace engineer, and space architect (born 1912)
- June 16 - Werner Eggerath, German politician and writer (born 1900)
- June 30 - Paul Hartmann, German actor (born 1889)
- July 30 - Jürgen Ponto, German bankier (born 1923)
- August 4 - Ernst Bloch, German philosopher (born 1885)
- August 28 - Peter Altmeier, politician (born 1899)
- August 29 - Annemarie Steinsieck, actress (born 1889)
- September 3 - Erna Herchenröder, trade unionist and politician (born 1903)
- September 7 - Edgar Basel, German boxer (born 1930)
- October 10 - Lea Grundig, German painter (born 1906)
- October 18 - Hanns Martin Schleyer, business executive and employer and industry representative (born 1915)
- October 26 - Elisabeth Flickenschildt, German actress (born 1905)
- November 2 - Hans Erich Nossack, German writer (born 1901)
- December 22 - Karl John, German actor (born 1905)
