= Türkiz Talay =

Turkish-German actress (born 1974)

- Born: Türkiz Talay; April 8, 1974 (age 52); West Berlin, West Germany.
- Years active: 1987–present
- Website: www.tuerkiz-talay.de

Türkiz Talay (born April 8, 1974) is a Turkish-German actress.

== Filmography ==
Film
Year	Film	Role	Notes
2010	Ayla	Hülya	
2006	Goldene Zeiten	Soapdarstellerin #2	Credited as Tükiz Talay
1999	Alte Zeiten	Nadja	

=== Television ===
Year	Film	Role	Notes
2006	Hammer & Hart	Yüksel	
2006	Türkisch für Anfänger	Frau Sismanoglu	3 episodes
2003	Im Namen des Gesetzes	Tanja Schulz	
2003	Fliege kehrt zurück		
2002	Küstenwache	Maria Ehrlich	1 episode
2002	S.O.S. Barracuda	Maria Rodriguez	2 episodes
2002	Alles getürkt!	Nihan Karagöz	
2000	Codename: Puma	Fatma	
2000	At Your Own Risk	Melah Taskin	1 episode
1999	Die Kommissarin	Meryem	1 episode
1998	Die Schule am See	Carla	1 episode
1997	Gegen den Wind	Rebecca	1 episode
1996	SK-Babies	Nesrin Üstünkaya	6 episodes
1995	Frauenarzt Dr. Markus Merthin	Gül	1 episode
1987	Moskito - Nichts sticht besser!		
