= Dennenesch Zoudé =

German actress (born 1966)

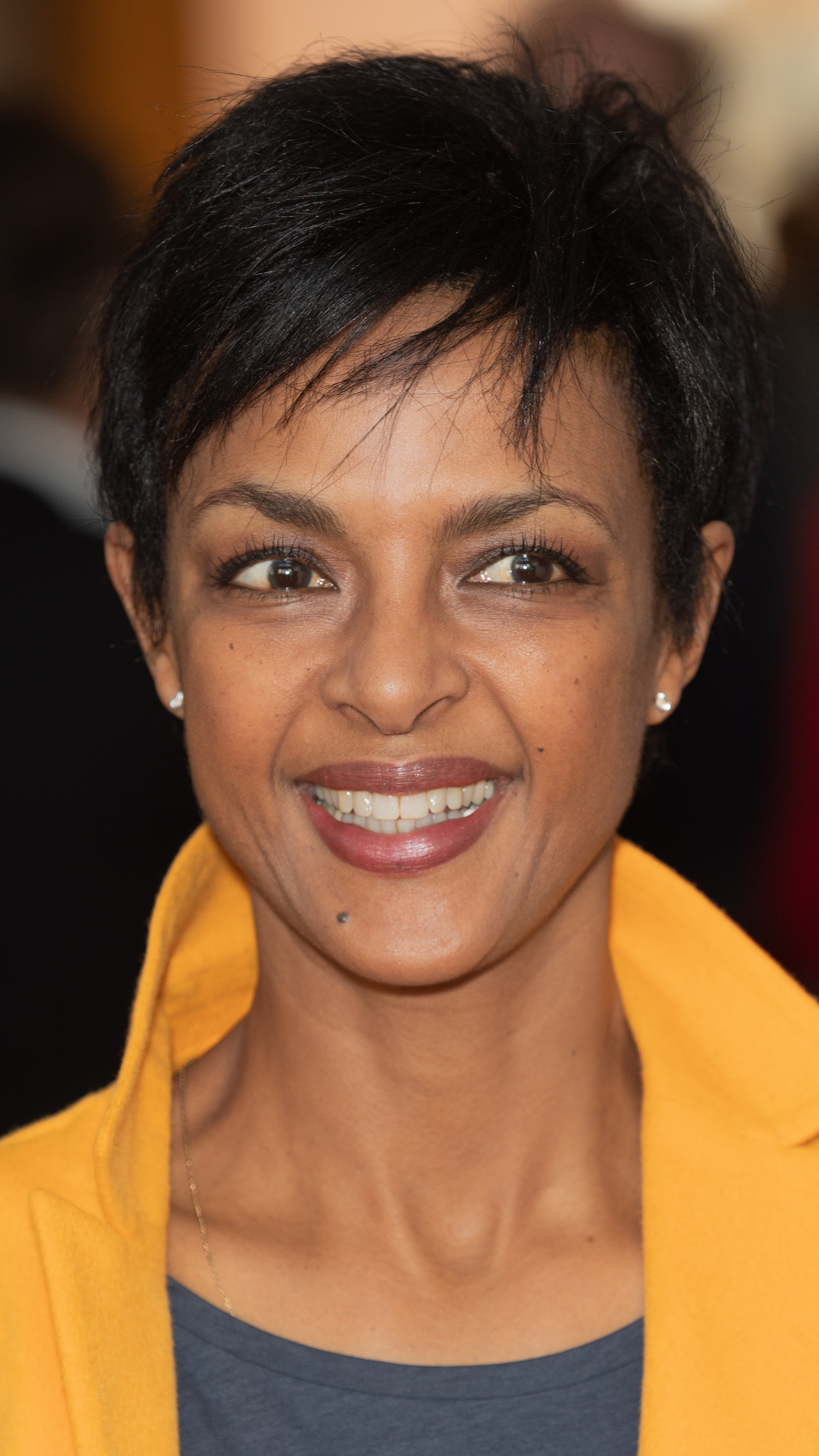
- Born: 14 December 1966 (age 59); Addis Abeba, Ethiopian Empire
- Occupation: Actress
- Years active: 1986 — present
- Website: Dennenesch Zoudé

Dennenesch Zoudé (born 14 December 1966) is a German actress. Zoudé is a board member of Deutsche Filmakademie (The German Film Academy). She was married to German film director Carlo Rola and lives in Berlin.

== Life ==
Dennenesch Zoudé was born in Addis Abeba, Ethiopia. When she was two (1968) her family moved to West Berlin, Germany. After finishing High School she trained to be a business correspondent, as was her parents' wish. Afterwards she started working as a secretary in a contracting firm in Berlin. Later, she trained to become an actress at the Neighborhood Playhouse School of the Theatre in New York City. Additionally, Zoudé took singing lessons with Cullen Maiden and Veronika Fischer.

From 1996 to 2000 Dennenesch Zoudé was in a relationship with author and TV presenter Roger Willemsen. In 2001 she started dating Carlo Rola, a German director, producer and screenwriter. They got married on October 6, 2009, in New York City, which was also Rola's birthday. In 2016 Carlo Rola died of sudden cardiac death.

Since February 24, 2020 Zoudé is a board member of Deutsche Filmakademie (The German Film Academy).

== Work ==
In 1995/96 Dennenesch Zoudé became famous for appearing in the German TV show Gegen den Wind. Her first role in a play was in 1996, in the play Lysistrata directed by Jürgen Benecke. In 1999 Zoudé played in Hemingway`s The Fifth Column at the Ernst Deutsch Theater, directed by Christian Kohlund. In 2002 and 2003 she was the love interest in the Berlin Everyman Festival in Jedermann by Brigitte Grothum.

In 2006 Dennenesch Zoudé portrayed the female lead in the TV drama Meine Mutter tanzend. It is the story about the hardships mother and daughter face while trying to get to know each other. Zoudé's character, the adopted Stella Ahrens, wants to find out more about her family heritage and finds her biological mother – a white cashier at a supermarket. The actress was also starring in the 2008 remake of Und Jimmy ging zum Regenbogen, based on the book of the same name, alongside Heino Ferch. The director of the film was her late husband Carlo Rola.

Since then she has been a part of various, mostly German, productions, her most recent being the Netflix mini series Unorthodox.

== Social involvement ==
From 2006 to 2010 Zoudé was a Special Ambassador for United Buddy Bears at several events. Additionally, promoted the Stiftung Lesen by being a Reading Ambassador.

As of 2015 Dennenesch Zoudé is a patron of the Fairchance Foundation, which offers aid programs for immigrant children in Germany to help their integration.
