= 1962 in German television =

This is a list of German television related events from 1962.

== Events ==
- 17 February - Conny Froboess is selected to represent Germany at the 1962 Eurovision Song Contest with her song "Zwei kleine Italiener". She is selected to be the seventh German Eurovision entry during Deutsche Schlager-Festspiele held at the Kurhus in Baden-Baden.

== Debuts ==
- 3 January – Das Halstuch (1962)

== Television shows ==
=== 1950s ===
- Tagesschau (1952–present)

=== 1960s ===
- Der schwarze Kanal (1960–1989)

== Birth ==
- 8 February – Martin Wuttke, actor
- 1 April – Stefanie Tücking, radio and television presenter (died 2018)
- 24 June – Christine Neubauer, actress

== See also ==
1962 in Germany
