= Gegen den Wind =

- Genre: Action
- Country of origin: Germany
- No. of seasons: 4
- No. of episodes: 52

Production
- Running time: 50 minutes

Original release
- Release: 1995 – 1999

Gegen den Wind (Against the Wind) is a German television series which ran from 1995 to 1999.

== Cast ==
- Ralf Bauer as Nik Andersen
- Hardy Krüger junior as Sven Westermann
- Alexander Haugg as Knut
- Henry van Lyck as John Westermann
- Daniela Ziegler as Christine Andersen
- Dennenesch Zoudé as Sarah
- Hendrik Martz as Tjard
- Antonio Putignano as Rocky
- Katrin Weisser as Martina
- Ivana Kansy as Iwana
- Patrick Harzig as Dennis
- Eva Habermann as Paula
- Detlef Bothe
- Türkiz Talay
- Bianca Amato
