= 1959 in German television =

This is a list of German television related events from 1959.

== Events ==
- 11 March – West Germany's Kessler Twins finish 8th at the 1959 Eurovision Song Contest in Cannes.

== Debuts ==
=== ARD ===
- 17 January – Gesucht wird Mörder X (1959)
- 12 February – As Far as My Feet Will Carry Me (1959)
- 11 September – Wir richten ein (1959–1964)
- 5 October – Der Andere (1959)
- 11 November – Wer nicht hören will, muß fernsehen... (1959–1960)

=== DFF ===
- 20 August – Blaulicht (1959–1968)
- 14 September – Professor Flimmrich (1959–1991)

== Ending this year ==
- Haare hoch! (since 1958)

== Networks and services ==
=== Launches ===
Network	Type	Launch date	Notes	Source
[[]]	Cable and satellite			

=== Conversions and rebrandings ===
Old network name	New network name	Type	Conversion Date	Notes	Source
YoungTV	AB3	Cable and satellite	6 October		

=== Closures ===
Network	Type	End date	Notes	Sources
[[]]	Cable and satellite			
