= 1978 in Philippine television =

The following is a list of events affecting Philippine television in 1978. Events listed include television show debuts, finales, cancellations, and channel launches, closures and rebrandings, as well as information about controversies and carriage disputes.

== Premieres ==
Date	Program	Notes
April 16	PBA on GTV on GTV 4	
May 5	Voltes V on GMA 7	
May 7	GMA Supershow on GMA 7	
September 21	Tadhana on GMA 7, RPN 9, IBC 13	Television film Philippine's first feature-length animated film
October 3	Iskul Bukol on IBC 13	

=== Unknown ===
- Basta Barkada on RPN 9
- Spiritual Vignettes on RPN 9
- The DPI Mid-Day Report on GTV 4
- Brocka Presents on GTV 4
- Friends with TVJ and Charo on GTV 4
- Metro Magazine on GTV 4
- Ice Hockey on GTV 4
- Pelikulang Pansabado on GTV 4
- Visions 1990 on GMA 7
- Coffee with Us on GMA 7 Cebu
- News at Seven Cebu on GMA 7 Cebu
- Eight Is Enough on GMA 7
- The Love Boat on GMA 7
- Daimos on GMA 7
- Three's Company on GMA 7
- Lucan on IBC 13

== Returning or renamed programs ==
Show	Last aired	Retitled as/Season/Notes	Channel	Return date
Philippine Basketball Association	1977 (RPN; season 3: "Invitational Championship")	Same (season 4: "All-Filipino Conference")	GTV	April 16
Philippine Basketball Association	1978 (season 4: "All-Filipino Conference")	Same (season 4: "Open Conference")	GTV	July 30
Philippine Basketball Association	1978 (season 4: "Open Conference")	Same (season 4: "Invitational Championship")	GTV	November 25

== Programs transferring networks ==
Date	Show	No. of seasons	Moved from	Moved to
April 16	Philippine Basketball Association	4	RPN	GTV

== Finales ==
=== Unknown ===
- Makulay ang Daigdig ni Nora on RPN 9
- Kumpletos Recados on RPN 9
- Ariel and Co. after Six on BBC 2
- The DPI Mid-Day Report on GTV 4
- The Morning Show on GTV 4
- Dulansining on GTV 4
- Starliner... Man and Woman on GTV 4
- Friends with TVJ and Charo on GTV 4
- Metro Magazine on GTV 4
- Pamantayan ng Talino on GTV 4
- Chess Today on GTV 4
- Last Full Show on GTV 4
- Pelikulang Pansabado on GTV 4
- Premiere Theater on GTV 4
- Visions 1990 on GMA 7
- Chico and the Man on GMA 7
- Donny & Marie on GMA 7
- The Mary Tyler Moore Show on GMA 7
- Ito ang Inyong Tia Dely on IBC 13
- Barok-an Subdivision on IBC 13
- Enter JJ on IBC 13
- Lucan on IBC 13

== Births ==
- May 11 – Judy Ann Santos, television and film actress
- June 17 – KC Montero, television actor and host
- August 17 – Vanessa del Bianco
- November 6 – Jolina Magdangal, singer, television and film actress

== See also ==
- 1978 in television
