= Kaiser Wilhelm Bridge =

Swing bridge in Wilhelmshaven, Germany

Coordinates: 53°30′49″N 8°08′07″E

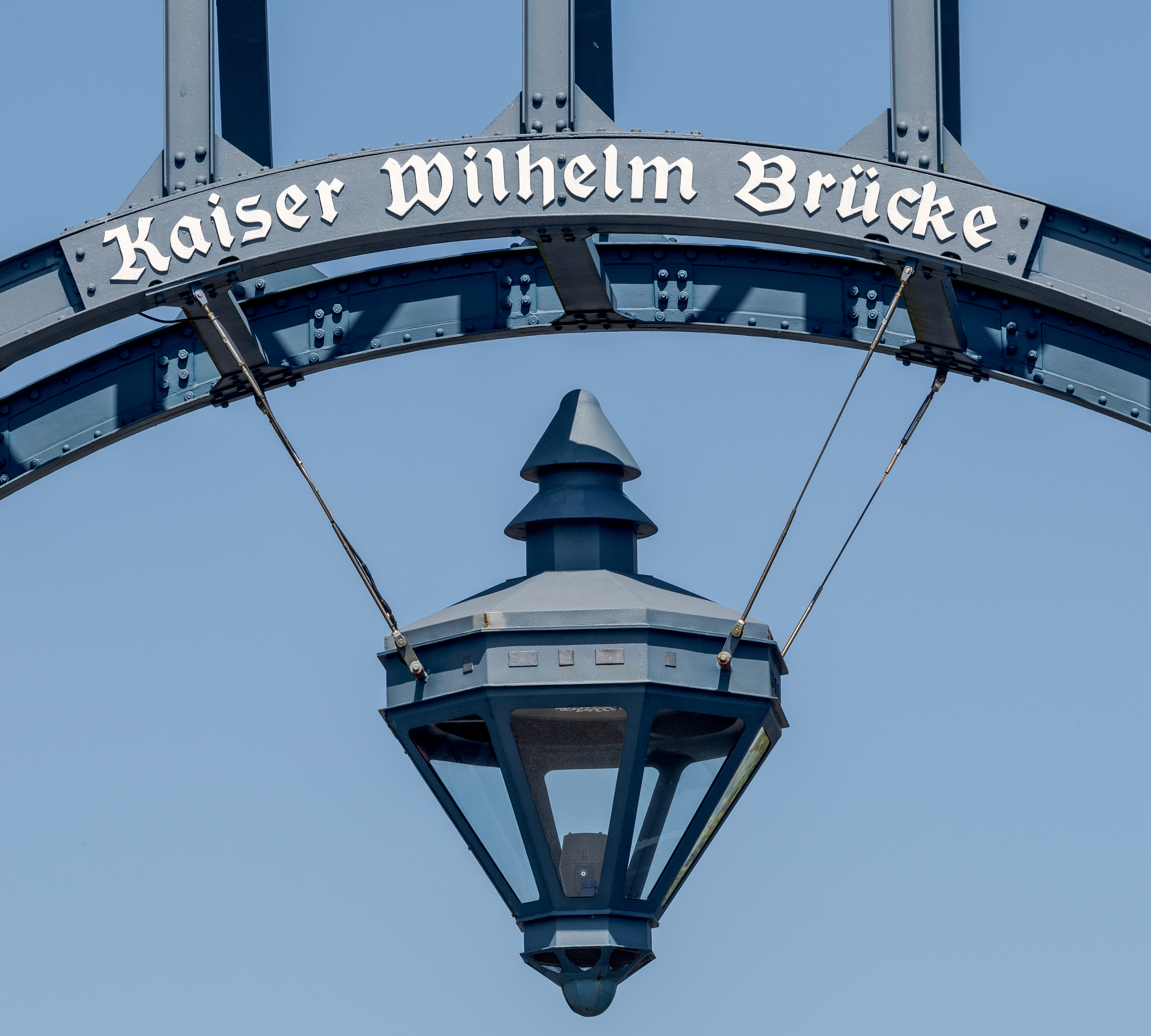

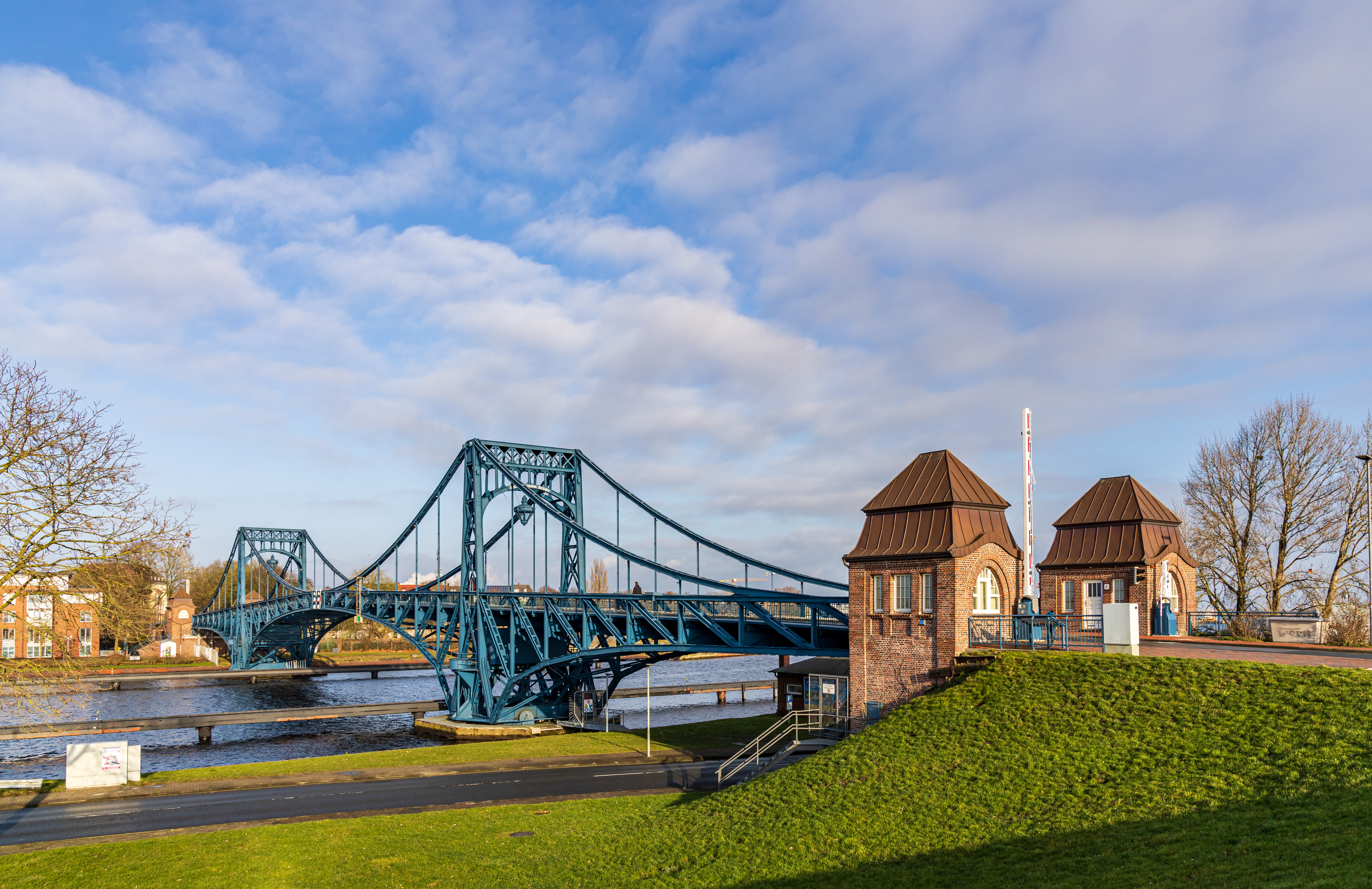
Kaiser Wilhelm Bridge in Wilhelmshaven

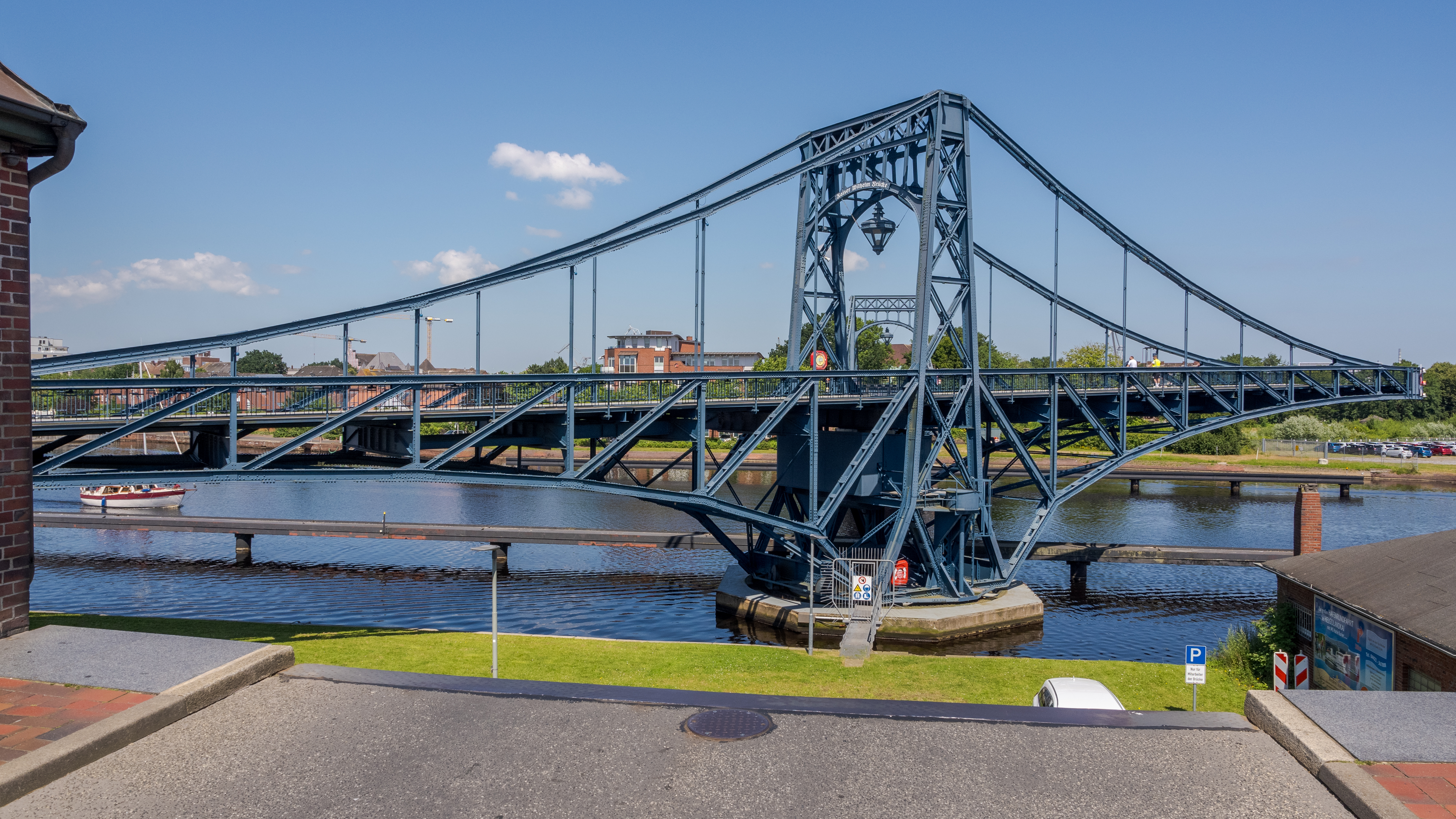
Opened bridge

The Kaiser Wilhelm Bridge (German: Kaiser-Wilhelm-Brücke, 'Emperor William Bridge') is a swing bridge in Wilhelmshaven, Germany, and the town's landmark.

== Location ==
The Kaiser Wilhelm Bridge connects the beach (Südstrandpromenade) with the South Quarter.

== History ==
Construction began in 1905, and at its completion in 1907 it was Europe's longest swing bridge. The design scheme was created by Ernst Troschel, construction was executed by MAN Nuremberg.

In 1998 the rotary mechanics of the southern part of the bridge were damaged when a tugboat collided with a frigate and had to be partially repaired. In 2003, a cargo ship rammed and slightly damaged the bridge.

From September 2010 to September 2013, the bridge was closed to the public for repairs.

== Specifications ==
The bridge has a length of 159 metres (522 ft) and a width of 8 m. The two pillars are 20.4 m tall. The maximum passage height is 9.00 m at + 1.10 m medium water-level in the harbour, the passage width is 58.60 m.

On the bridge the road traffic can only drive one way at the same time. It is controlled by traffic lights. Before it tilts out the bridge is blocked for the whole traffic by light signals and pikes.

== Postage stamp ==
In 2007, Deutsche Post released a 1.45-euro stamp to commemorate the centennial of the bridge.
