= Unter einem Dach =

- Country of origin: West Germany

Original release
- Network: ARD
- Release: 12 December 1974 – 21 December 1976

Unter einem Dach is a West German television series.

== See also ==
- List of German television series
