= Gertrud Morgner =

German politician (1887–1978)

- Born: Gertrud Müller; 8 August 1887; Gera, Principality of Reuss-Gera, German Empire
- Died: 20 July 1978 (aged 90); Berlin, East Germany
- Occupation: Political activist exiled in Kazakhstan
- Political party: SPD; Spartacus League; KPD; CPSU; SED
- Spouse: Edwin Morgner
- Children: Hildegard "Hilde" Morgner / Guddorf (1907-1980)

Gertrud Morgner (born Gertrud Müller: 8 August 1887 – 20 July 1978) was a German politician and, especially as a young woman, women's rights campaigner. She was a co-founder of the Jena branch of the Communist Party.

In 1932 she emigrated with her husband to the Soviet Union. Her husband was arrested in 1941; the circumstances of his death remain unknown. Gertrud was refused permission to leave the Soviet Union till 1954, when she returned to what had by this time become the German Democratic Republic (East Germany) where she found she had acquired a certain official celebrity, honoured as a "[Communist] party veteran".

== Life ==
=== Family provenance and early years ===
Gertrud Müller was born in Gera, in the Principality of Reuss-Gera. Her father was a weaver. She trained for work in garment manufacturing and, in 1907, married the trades official Edwin Morgner (1884–1943). Their daughter, Hildegard (1907–1980) was born later in the same year, after which the family relocated to Jena, where Edwin Morgner found work as a lathe operator with Carl Zeiss AG. Edwin Morgner had been a member of the Social Democratic Party (SPD) since 1902 and in 1908 a significant prohibition on female participation in politics was lifted. Gertrud Morgner joined the SPD in 1909 and began to work for the party in Jena on an honorary (i.e. unpaid) basis. Between 1909 and 1913 she was a member of the local party executive and head of its women's committee for Jena. In 1916 she joined the Spartacus League, an anti-war group headed by Karl Liebknecht and Rosa Luxemburg (and others less well remembered) which had originated as a faction within the SPD. By this time she had become active as a distributor of pamphlets and organiser of women's demonstration opposing the war, as a result of which she was excluded from the SPD, though it is not clear from available sources whether this happened before or after she joined the Spartacus League. The next year the SPD itself broke apart, primarily because of acute opposition among party activists to what amounted to a parliamentary truce operated by the party leadership in the Reichstag for the duration of the war. Morgner was among many former SPD members who joined the breakaway faction, which now became identified as the Independent Social Democratic Party ("Unabhängige Sozialdemokratische Partei Deutschlands" / USPD).

=== Middle years: political activism ===
Germany's military defeat was followed by a series of revolutionary outbursts across the country. In an ad hoc election held in the city's market place Gertrud Morgner was elected deputy chair of the Soldiers' and Workers' Council in Jena. Edwin and Gertrud Morgner both took part in the three day founding party conference of the Communist Party of Germany which opened in Berlin on 30 December 1918. Edwin Morgner was at this time a member of the works council at Carl Zeiss, and on 11 January 1919, at a meeting conducted in the "Zum Löwen" trades union building, the Morgners, with 39 other comrades, founded a Jena branch of the new Communist Party. Gertrud Morgner was elected to the executive of Jena's local Communist Party and for a time she also served as a member of the party leadership team for Thuringia ("KPD-Bezirksleitung Thüringen").

She took part in the "March Action", identified as a member of the "revolutionary committee", during the first part of 1921 and therefore became a "wanted person" in central Germany. In order to avoid possible punishment she relocated to Berlin where she lived illegally (i.e. without taking action to register her presence/residence with the city authorities).

Keen to reduce the risk of further violence, in 1922 the government issued a widespread amnesty to those involved in the previous year's insurrectionary activity, and in 1922 Morgner felt able to "resurface", active between 1922 and 1926 in the Communist Party's national women's leadership ("Reichsfrauenleitung") and working in the party central committee's propaganda department. Between 1927 and 1929 she was employed as secretary to Emil Höllein. Höllein was a Communist member of the national parliament (Reichstag). Morgner was not merely his secretary during this time but also his mistress. However, on 18 August 1929 Emil Höllein unexpectedly died. After this, during a period of intensifying social and political tensions in Germany, Morgner led a Communist Party operational cell ("KPD-Betriebszelle").

=== Emigration to the Soviet Union ===
In March 1932 Emil and Gertrud Morgner emigrated to the Soviet Union where Gertrud worked heading up the women's activist section of the foreigners' department and clubs. She also became a member of the Communist Party of the Soviet Union. In June 1941 she was appointed to an editorial position with Moscow Radio. However, her husband's time in Moscow was working out less well and in September 1941 he was arrested by the security services. Gertrud Morgner was now excluded from the Communist Party. She was later evacuated/exiled to Kazakhstan. Here she worked in garment making in Ossakarowka. It was only in 1949 that she was informed that her husband had already died in prison by 31 January 1943.

=== Return to East Germany ===
After war ended in May 1945, a large area round Berlin was administered as the Soviet occupation zone, relaunched in October 1949 as the Soviet sponsored German Democratic Republic (East Germany), a one-party state with institutions closely modeled on those of the Soviet Union itself. However, the ruling party was known not as the Communist Party but as the Socialist Unity Party ("Sozialistische Einheitspartei Deutschlands" / SED). Far from Berlin or Moscow, Gertrud Morgner was still being told, as late as June 1953, that her application to return to East Germany had been rejected because the Central Party Control Commission ("Zentrale Parteikontrollkommission") of the SED back in East Germany had her listed as an "expelled member of the Communist Party".

In May 1954 Gertrud Morgner was permitted to travel to East Germany, where she became an SED party member. She became active in the Democratic Women's League ("Demokratischer Frauenbund Deutschlands" / DFD), the National Front and the (East German) Peace Council. In East Germany she found herself honoured as a party veteran, but at the same time her fate and that of her husband in the Soviet Union were not to be subjects for public discussion. Privately she let her friends know of the way in which her soul had been deeply and irrecoverably shattered by the arrest and subsequent death of her husband.

=== Death and burial ===
Gertrud Morgner lived the final part of her life in the party central committee's retirement home in Berlin-Köpenick. She died on 20 July 1978. Her body was buried in the "Pergolenweg" section of the Friedrichsfelde Main cemetery. This cemetery was the one reserved for the bodies of East German political leaders and national heroes.

== Awards and honours ==
- 1959 Honorary citizenship of Jena
- 1972 Patriotic Order of Merit in gold
- 1977 Patriotic Order of Merit gold clasp
