= Blaulicht =

- Country of origin: East Germany
- No. of episodes: 33

Original release
- Release: 20 August 1959 – 27 October 1968

Blaulicht (Blue Light) is an East German crime television drama series, whose 33 episodes were based on crime case files. The opening theme music is Henry Mancini's composition, Peter Gunn.
