= Eyck Zimmer =

English chef (born 1969)

Eyck Zimmer (born 22 December 1969, Erfurt, German Democratic Republic) is a German chef. He was awarded the Chef of the Year in Great Britain 2006 and the Chef of the Year in Portugal 2008. Eyck's initial training was at the Erfurter Hof, part of the Interhotel chain. He then worked in a number of well-known hotels in Europe, Palasthotel (East Berlin), Grand Hotel Regina (Grindelwald, Switzerland), The Dorchester (Mayfair, London), The Berkeley (London), The Lanesborough (London), Claridge's (London), The Ritz (London), Choupana Hills in Madeira and the Lowry Hotel in Manchester, UK. Andel's Berlin Hotel, Germany. From 2010 to 2014 he held the position of Chef de Cuisine at the Hong Kong Jockey Clubs Derby Restaurant. and Bar in Hong Kong SAR. Eyck returned 2014 in the capacity of Culinary Director to the andels hotel Berlin with its skykitchen restaurant, gaining 1* Michelin the same year. After that he was the Chef de Cuisine at the Adlon in Berlin Germany for a short period of time. Currently he is the Culinary Director at the Square Nine Hotel in Belgrade Serbia, a small luxury five star hotel and member of the Leading Hotels of the World.

The French Republic awarded Eyck on the 21 July 2014 Ordre du Mérite Agricole (The Order of Agricultural Merit) for his contribution to French gastronomy.

== Awards and honors ==
- Chevalier Ordre du Mérite Agricole
- Meilleur Ouvrier de Grande Bretagne (now Master of Culinary Arts) in 2000 in the United Kingdom.
- Second Prize at the International Final of the 2002 Prix Pierre Taittinger Culinaire International Paris, France.
- Twice UK representative at the Bocuse d'Or in Lyon France, 8th place (2003)& 2005
- Chef Award - Competition, Craft Guild of Chefs, United Kingdom
- Twice winner (2004 & 2008) of the Grand Prix de Cuisine at Le Trophée International de Cuisine et Pâtisserie in Paris, France
- Manchester Chef of the Year in 2006 and Winner of Restaurant of the Year 2006 (Manchester Tourist Board)
- National Chef of the Year, United Kingdom in 2006
- Best Chef Mentor Northern Hospitality Award 2008
- Portuguese Chef of the Year in 2008
- Member of the Academie Culinaire de France
- Disciples of Escoffier Hong Kong-Asia
