= Ehen vor Gericht =

German television series

- Country of origin: Germany

Ehen vor Gericht is a German television series.

== See also ==
- List of German television series
