= 1978 in Dutch television =

This is a list of Dutch television related events from 1978.

== Events ==
- 22 February – Harmony are selected to represent Netherlands at the 1978 Eurovision Song Contest with their song "'t Is OK". They are selected to be the twenty-third Dutch Eurovision entry during Nationaal Songfestival held at Congresgebouw in The Hague.
- 22 April – Israel wins the Eurovision Song Contest with the song "A-Ba-Ni-Bi" by Izhar Cohen and the Alphabeta. The Netherlands finish in thirteenth place with the song "'t Is OK" by Harmony.

== Television shows ==
=== 1950s ===
- NOS Journaal (1956–present)
- Pipo de Clown (1958–present)

=== 1970s ===
- Sesamstraat (1976–present)

== Births ==
- 24 October – Christophe Haddad, Belgian-born actor.
