= Jan Degenhardt =

German Lawyer and folk-singer

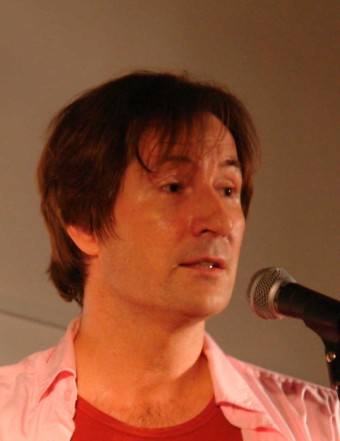

Background information
- Born: 9 July 1962 (age 64); Saarbrücken, Saarland, Germany
- Origin: Greifswald, Mecklenburg-Vorpommern, Germany
- Genres: Singer, songwriter
- Instruments: Singing, guitar
- Years active: 1999–present
- Label: Conträr Musik
- Website: www.j-degenhardt.de

Jan Degenhardt (born 9 July 1962) is a German lawyer and folk-singer. His father was the political poet, writer, singer and lawyer Franz Josef Degenhardt.

== Life and career ==
Born in Saarbrücken, he studied jurisprudence in Hamburg from 1983 to 1990. After that he moved to Greifswald and worked as a docent at the Grone-school and the University of Greifswald until 1993. 1992 Degenhardt established as a lawyer in Greifswald.

In 1999, he published his first album with the title „Aufbruch". His same-named Song gets to the highscore list of the SFB in 2000. The same year he reached the second place at "Deutscher FolkFörderpreis".

After a promotion tour Jan Degenhardt published his second album called Stimmen hinter'm Spiegel in summer 2004. The contained song Marathon Berlin reached the 9th place at the Liederbestenliste of the society for German-language music.

In February 2011, his third album named Schamlos was chosen as CD of the month in June. The same month the song "Demokratie" reached the 8th place at the Liederbestenliste, even in July, it moved to second position.

Beside his father Franz Josef Degenhardt his brother Kai Degenhardt makes music, too.

== Discography ==
- 1999 Aufbruch
- 2004 Stimmen hinter'm Spiegel
- 2011 Schamlos
- 2023 Inshallah

== Honors and awards ==
- Deutscher FolkFörderpreis 2000
- Schamlos CD of the month at Liederbestenliste June 2011
