= 1961 in German television =

This is a list of German television related events from 1961.

== Events ==
- 25 February – Lale Andersen is selected to represent Germany at the 1961 Eurovision Song Contest with her song "Einmal sehen wir uns wieder". She is selected to be the sixth German Eurovision entry during Die Schlagerparade held at the Kurhus in Bad Homburg vor der Höhe.
- 18 March – Luxembourg wins the Eurovision Song Contest with the song "Nous les amoureux" by Jean-Claude Pascal. Germany finish in thirteenth place with Lale Andersen's song "Einmal sehen wir uns wieder".

== Debuts ==
=== ARD ===
- 10 January – Funkstreife Isar 12 (1961–1963)
- 24 January – Adieu, Prinzessin (1961)
- 27 February – Zu viele Köche (1961)
- 12 March – Hotel Victoria (1961–1968)
- 26 March – Das Fernsehgericht tagt (1961–1978)
- 13 May – Heinz Erhardt Festival (1961–1963)
- 18 May – Zeit der Schuldlosen (1961)
- 26 May – Inspector Hornleigh Intervenes (1961)
- 13 June – Die merkwürdigen Erlebnisse des Hansjürgen Weidlich (1961–1963)
- 22 September – Die Rückblende (1961–1963)
- 4 October – Gestatten, mein Name ist Cox (1961–1965)
- 22 October – Musik aus Studio B (1961–1976)
- 8 December – Komische Geschichten mit Georg Thomalla (1961–1971)
- Unknown – Unternehmen Kummerkasten (1961–1962)

=== DFF ===
- 24 October – Geheime Front durchbrochen (1961–1962)

=== International ===
- 20 March – (United States) The Huckleberry Hound Show (1958–1961) (Das Erste)

== Television shows ==
=== 1950s ===
- Tagesschau (1952–present)

== Networks and services ==
=== Launches ===
Network	Type	Launch date	Notes	Source
ARD 2	Cable and satellite	Unknown		
