= Rentner haben niemals Zeit =

- Country of origin: East Germany

Rentner haben niemals Zeit ("Retirees never have time") is an East German television series.

== See also ==
- List of German television series
