= Alexander Ebner =

German political scientist

Alexander Ebner (born 19 October 1967) is a German social scientist and Professor of Social Economics, esp. Economic Sociology and Political Economy at the Goethe University Frankfurt. His main research fields are Entrepreneurship and Innovation, Governance and Public Policy, Regional Development, and the History of Economics.

== Background ==
Alexander Ebner received his diploma degrees in political sciences and economics from the Goethe University Frankfurt. His first appointment was as a research assistant at the Institute of Economic and Social Geography at the Goethe University. From 1998 to 2001, he was research and teaching assistant at the Professorship of Economics, esp. Economic Theory (Chair: Prof. Dr. Bertram Schefold) at the Faculty of Economics and Business Administration at the Goethe University. He awarded a doctorate in economics with a dissertation thesis on the theory of entrepreneurship and innovation (Dr. rer. pol., summa cum laude) by the same institution in 2002. Subsequently, he was an assistant professor (C1) at the Krupp-Chair of Public Finance and Fiscal Sociology at the University of Erfurt. His habilitation in 2008 was based on the interdisciplinary habilitation thesis "Governance and Public Policy".

International teaching experiences include the EuroFaculty at the Latvian University in Riga and the European Business School in Wiesbaden, among others. International research affiliations include the Berkeley Center on Law, Business and the Economy at the University of California, Berkeley as well as at the Institute of Southeast Asian Studies in Singapore. Between 2006 and 2009, he held the position of an Affiliate Professor at Grenoble Ecole de Management. From 2008 to 2009, Alexander Ebner was an Associate Professor of Political Economy at the School of Humanities and Social Sciences at the Jacobs University Bremen. Since July 2009 he has held the Professorship of Social Economics, esp. Economic Sociology and Political Economy at Goethe University Frankfurt. In addition, he is the Founding Director of the Schumpeter Center for Cluster, Entrepreneurship and Innovation at Goethe University.

== Research and teaching ==
The emphasis in research and teaching is core areas of political economy and economic sociology. His theoretical position refers to the new institutionalism in the social sciences with a focus on the matter of entrepreneurship, innovation, governance and development. Current research projects address subjects such as institutional transformations in the relationship between states and markets, regional cluster strategies, transnational entrepreneurship, and cultural aspects of socio-economic change. Since August 2010, Alexander Ebner is Director of the Schumpeter Center for Cluster, Entrepreneurship and Innovation at the Goethe University Frankfurt. The mission of this research center is applied research on industrial and regional development.

Alexander Ebner is a member of the following professional associations: Verein für Socialpolitik/German Economic Association (committee for evolutionary economics and committee for the history of economics, elected member), German Sociological Association (section on economic sociology), Deutsche Vereinigung für Politische Wissenschaft (German Association for Political Sciences) (section on political economy). At the international level he is a member in the Society for the Advancement of Socio-Economics (SASE) and the International Joseph A. Schumpeter Society, among others. In 2012, he co-founded the European Network on Knowledge, Innovation and Development (Eur-KInD).

== Bibliography (selection) ==
- “Embedded Entrepreneurship: The Institutional Dynamics of Innovation”, London und New York: Routledge, 2012 (forthcoming).
- “Innovationsstrategien und Regionalentwicklung: Theorie und Empirie regionaler Innovationsprozesse”, Wiesbaden: Verlag für Sozialwissenschaften, 2012 (forthcoming).
- (ed.) “Innovationssysteme: Technologie, Institutionen und die Dynamik der Wettbewerbsfähigkeit”, Wiesbaden: Verlag für Sozialwissenschaften, 2009 (with B. Blättel-Mink). http://www.springer-vs.de/Buch/978-3-531-14937-0/Innovationssysteme.html
- (ed.) “The Institutions of the Market: Organisations, Social Systems, and Governance”, Oxford and New York: Oxford University Press, 2008 (with N. Beck). http://ukcatalogue.oup.com/product/9780199231423.do?keyword=The+Institutions+of+the+Market%3A+Organisations%2C+Social+Systems%2C+and+Gov&sortby=bestMatches
- (ed.) “Innovation zwischen Markt und Staat: Die institutionelle Dynamik des wirtschaftlichen Wandels”, Baden-Baden: Nomos, 2007 (with K. Heine und J. Schnellenbach). http://www.nomos-shop.de/Ebner-Heine-Schnellenbach-Innovation-zwischen-Markt-Staat/productview.aspx?product=9378
- (ed.) “Institutioneller Wandel, Marktprozesse und dynamische Wirtschaftspolitik”, Marburg: Metropolis, 2004 (with D. Fornahl und M. Lehmann-Waffenschmidt). http://www.metropolis-verlag.de/Institutioneller-Wandel%2C-Marktprozesse-und-dynamische-Wirtschaftspolitik/468/book.do
- (ed.) “Werner Sombart: Nationalökonomie als Kapitalismustheorie. Ausgewählte Schriften”, Marburg: Metropolis, 2002 (with H. Peukert). http://www.metropolis-verlag.de/Nationaloekonomie-als-Kapitalismustheorie/407/book.do
