= Der Fall von nebenan =

- Starring: Ruth Maria Kubitschek
- Country of origin: Germany

Der Fall von nebenan is a German television series.

== See also ==
- List of German television series
