= East German Republic Day Parade of 1974 =

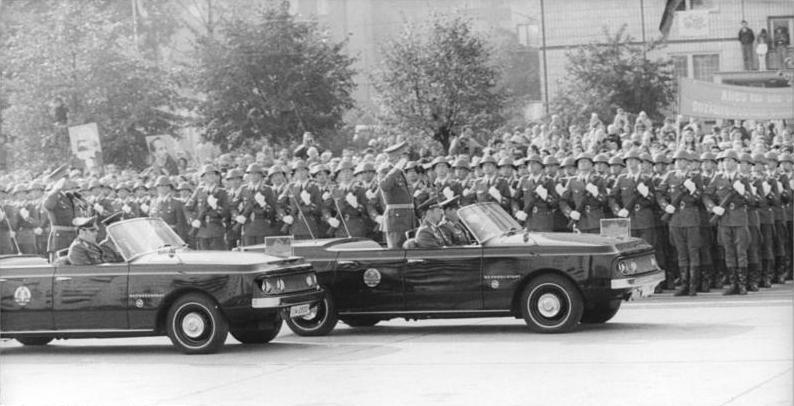
The reviewing officers during the 25th anniversary parade in 1974.

The East German Republic Day Parade of 1974 was a military parade of the National People's Army on Karl-Marx-Allee in East Berlin on 7 October 1974, the GDR's Republic Day, commemorating the 25th anniversary of the establishment of East Germany. This parade was held in the presence of Soviet Leader Leonid Brezhnev.

== Gallery ==
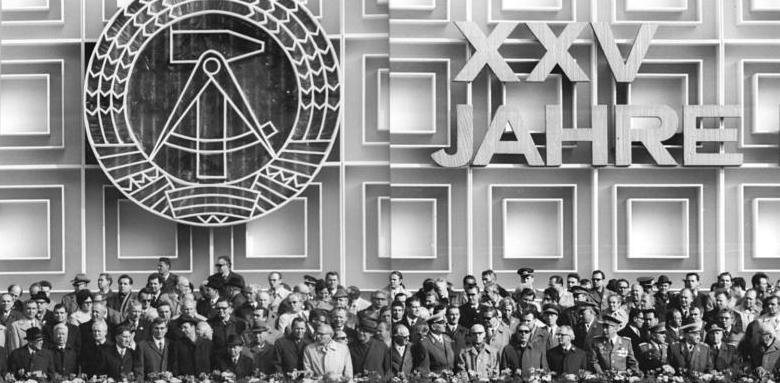

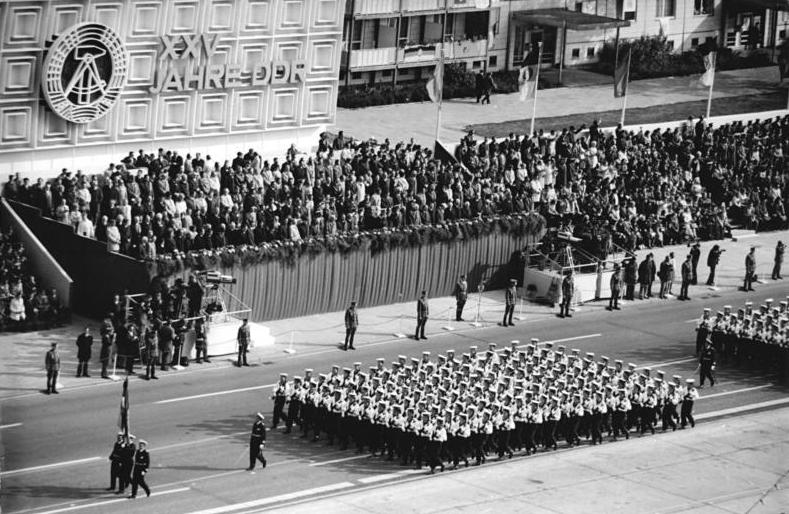

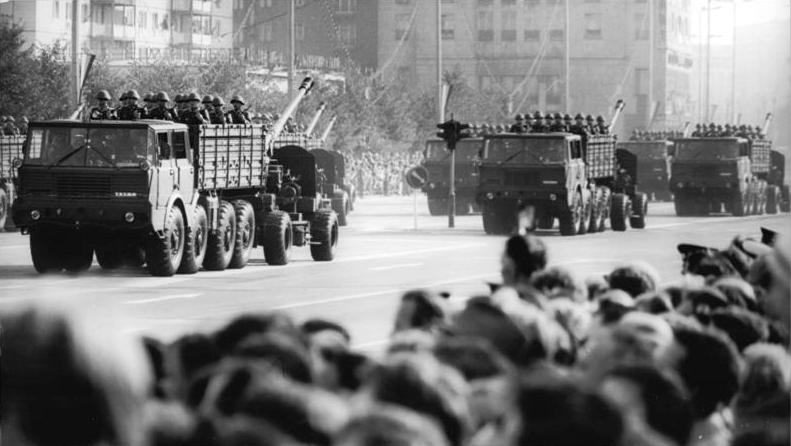

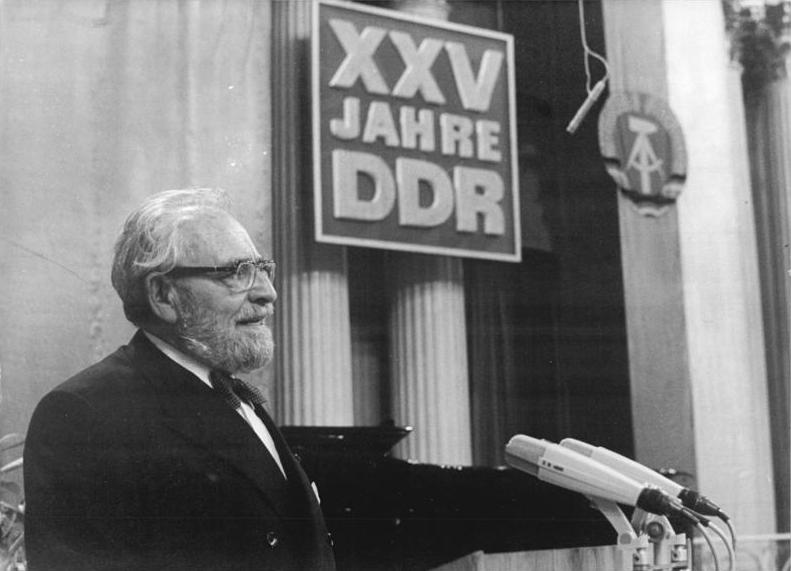

== See also ==
- 25 Jahre DDR - Ehrenparade der NVA - 1974
- Nationale Volksarmee parade rehearsal 1974
- Public holidays in Germany
