= Jacob Friedrich Behrend =

German jurist (1833–1907)

Jacob/Jakob Friedrich Behrend (13 September 1833 in Berlin – 9 January 1907) was a German jurist. His father was Friedrich Jakob Behrend, a German physician.

He finished his studies in his native city at the university. He became "Gerichtsassessor" in 1859; but, deciding upon a scholastic career, he became privatdozent at the Berlin University in 1864. The first-fruit of his research was the Magdeburger Fragen, edited by him, and published in Berlin, 1865. This 300-page treatise is a critical treatment of the manuscripts which are in existence under this name, and are traced by him to a Prussian origin of about the period from 1386 to 1402, and dealing with the "Schöffen-Recht." The next product of his industry in the same direction was Ein Stendaler Urtheilsbuch aus dem 14ten Jahrhundert, Berlin, 1868. This consists of thirty-one decisions of the Magdeburger Schöffenstuhl, published for the first time from a manuscript in the Royal Library, Berlin. Each decision is furnished with an exhaustive commentary. It was received by juridical scholars as a perfect model of such work.

Behrend became associate professor of jurisprudence at Berlin University in 1870. In the following year he assumed the editorial management of the Zeitschrift für die Deutsche Gesetzgebung und für Einheitliches Deutsches Recht. In 1873 Felix Dahn was associated with him in this magazine, the title of which was changed in 1875 to Zeitschrift für Gesetzgebung und Rechtspflege in Preussen. A treatise by him, Zum Prozess der Lex Salica, appeared in the Festgaben für A. W. Heffter, Berlin, 1873; and in the same year he issued his masterly contribution to the literature of the law of stock corporations, Ein Gutachten über die Aktiengesellschaften, which was published in the Schriften des Vereins für Social-Politik, Leipzig, 1873. That year was memorable, too, for his having received a call from the University of Greifswald as professor of jurisprudence, which he accepted.

His next important production, and probably his most substantial contribution of permanent value, to legal literature is the Lex Salica, Nebst den Capitularien zur Lex Salica, bearbeitet von Alf. Boretius, xxiii. 164, Berlin, 1874. The scholarly and exhaustive manner in which Behrend proposed the task of editing critically the manuscripts of this code of laws of the early Franks is attested by the fact that a revised and enlarged edition was issued twenty-three years later; viz., at Weimar in 1897.

In 1880 the publication of Behrend's Lehrbuch des Handelsrechts, designed to be comprised in two volumes, was begun in serial form by the issue of the first Lieferung of 192 pages. Its great importance was immediately recognized as being the first comprehensive scientific exposition of German commercial law. The production of this vast undertaking was, however, a slow process. In sixteen years six parts were issued, completing the first volume of nearly 1,000 pages. Another of Behrend's works worthy of mention is Anevang und Erbengewere, Berlin, 1885. In 1888 he received the appointment of "Reichsgerichtsrath" in Leipzig, a judicial position in the highest court in Germany. The Order of the Red Eagle (second class) was conferred upon Behrend in October 1900.
