= 1966 in German television =

This is a list of German television related events from 1966.

== Debuts ==
=== ARD ===
- January – Father Brown (1966–1972)
- 8 February – Die Gentlemen bitten zur Kasse (1966)
- 1 July – (United States) The Flintstones (1960–1966)
- 12 September – The White Horses (1966–1967)
- 17 September – Raumpatrouille – Die phantastischen Abenteuer des Raumschiffes Orion (1966)
- 5 December – Polizeifunk ruft (1966–1970)

=== ZDF ===
- 19 October – Cliff Dexter (1966–1968)
- 25 December – Treasure Island (1966–1967)

=== DFF ===
- 26 November – Schatten über Notre Dame (1966)

== Television shows ==
=== 1950s ===
- Tagesschau (1952–present)

=== 1960s ===
- heute (1963–present)
- Raumpatrouille (1966)

== Births ==
- 21 February – Axel Bulthaupt, TV host
- 15 May – Husam Chadat, actor (born in Syria)
