= Alfred Kirchhoff =

German geographer and naturalist

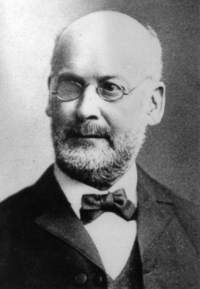

Alfred Kirchhoff (23 May 1838 in Erfurt – 8 February 1907 in Mockau) was a German geographer and naturalist.

== Biography ==
He was educated at Jena and Bonn, and for several years was an instructor at schools in Mülheim an der Ruhr and Erfurt. From 1871 to 1873 he was a lecturer on geography at the Kriegsakademie of Berlin, and in the latter year was appointed to the chair of geography in the University of Halle. He was an editor of the Anleitung zur deutschen Landes- und Volksforschung.

He was elected member of the Academy of Sciences Leopoldina in 1878 and of the Royal Society of Arts and Sciences in Gothenburg in 1888.

== Selected writings ==
- Schulbotanik (1865) – School botany.
- Die Südseeinseln und der Südseehandel, 1880 – The South Sea islands and trade.
- Schulgeographie, 1882 – School geography.
- Allgemeine Erdkunde: Pflanzen- und Tierverbreitung, with Julius von Hann and Eduard Bruckner (1899) – General geography; plant and animal distribution.
- Mensch und Erde; Skizzen von den Wechselbeziehungen zwischen beiden (3rd edition 1910); later translated into English as "Man and earth; the reciprocal relations and influences of man and his environment"; London, G. Routledge & sons, limited (1914).
- Unser Wissen von der Erde. Allgemeine Erdkunde und Länderkunde, in collaboration with other scholars (1886–93) – Our knowledge of the Earth. General and regional geography.
- Volapük : easy method of acquiring the universal language (constructed by Johann Martin Schleyer, prepared for the English-speaking public on the basis of Alfred Kirchhoff's "Hilfsbuch"; with the addition of a key to the exercises and a Volapük-English and English-Volapük vocabulary, by Klas August Linderfelt).
