= 1978 in German television =

This is a list of German television related events from 1978.

== Events ==
- 22 April – West Germany's representative Ireen Sheer finishes in sixth place at the 1978 Eurovision Song Contest in Paris.

== Debuts ==
=== ARD ===
- 2 January –
  - MS Franziska (1978)
  - Mein lieber Mann (1978)
- 3 January – Wenn die Liebe hinfällt (1978)
- 19 January – Detektiv Harvey (1978–1979)
- 11 February –
  - Zwei himmlische Töchter (1978)
  - Die Gimmicks (1978)
- 13 February – Anton Keil, der Specialkommissär (1978)
- 24 February – Uncle Bräsig (1978–1980)
- 26 February – Die Geschichte von Felix und Frauke (1978)
- 28 March – Der rostrote Ritter (1978)
- 4 April – Oh, This Father (1978–1981)
- 19 April – Ausgerissen! Was nun? (1978)
- 4 June – Lady Audley's Secret (1978)
- 31 July – Karschunke & Sohn (1978)
- 14 August – Jauche und Levkojen (1978–1980)
- 11 September – Die Kur (1978)
- 17 November – Unternehmen Rentnerkommune (1978–1979)
- 4 October – Lean Times (1978–1979)
- 16 October – Drei Damen vom Grill (1978–1992)
- 26 December – Sachrang (1978)

=== ZDF ===
- 2 January –
  - Schulbus 13 (1978)
  - SOKO München (1978–2020)
- 13 January – Geschichten aus der Zukunft (1978–1980)
- 21 January – Die Straße (1978)
- 2 February – Mirjam und der Lord vom Rummelplatz (1978)
- 25 March – Spannende Geschichten (1978)
- 26 March – Ein Mann will nach oben (1978)
- 10 April – Heiter bis wolkig (1978–1979)
- 16 November – Kläger und Beklagte (1978–1979)
- 19 November – Wallenstein (1978)
- 8 December – Kidnapped (1978)
- 20 December – Die nächste Party kommt bestimmt (1978–1980)

=== DFF ===
- 17 February – Schauspielereien (1978)
- 19 May – Gefährliche Fahndung (1978)
- 8 September Ein Zimmer mit Ausblick (1978)
- 8 November Marx und Engels - Stationen ihres Lebens (1978–1980)
- 2 December Rentner haben niemals Zeit (1978–1979)

== Ending this year ==
- Aus dem Logbuch der Peter Petersen (since 1977)
- Eichholz und Söhne (since 1977)
