= Hansjörg Schmidt =

German politician

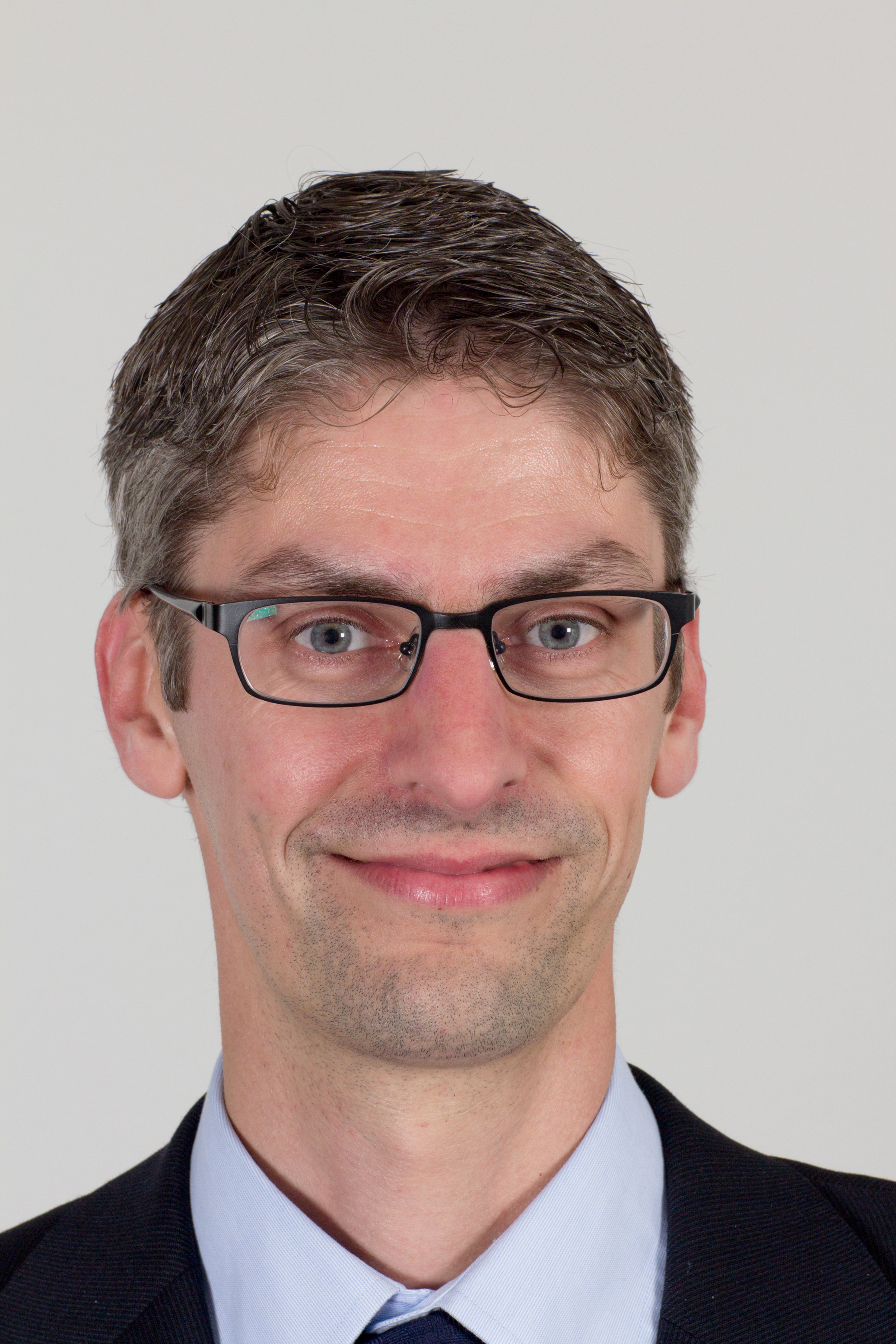
- Hansjörg Schmidt in June 2011

Member of the Hamburg Parliament
- Incumbent
- Assumed office 7 March 2011

Personal details
- Born: October 29, 1974 (age 51) Hamburg, Germany
- Party: SPD
- Website: hansjoerg-schmidt.de

Hansjörg Schmidt (born 29 October 1974) is a German Social Democratic politician and Member of the Hamburg Parliament since 7 March 2011.

== Life and work ==
After his final exams and computer science studies Schmidt founded the software company WICE GmbH in 2001 together with four of his fellow students. Currently, Schmidt is the chief marketing officer of WICE GmbH.

== Political career ==
Schmidt has been a member of the SPD in Hamburg-Mitte since 1997, and was their deputy parliamentary group leader between 2001 and 2008. Since 2008, he has been the parliamentary group leader and SPD's speaker in the urban planning commission of Hamburg. Schmidt ran for the 2008 Hamburg state election in voting district 1 (Hamburg-Mitte), and received 8.0 percent of the votes in his district. He was elected to Parliament at the election of 2008. A rerun for the 2011 Hamburg state election was successful and Schmidt gathered 10.2 percent of the votes in the same district. Since 7 March 2011 Hansjörg Schmidt has been a Member of the Hamburg Parliament.
