= 1955 in German television =

This is a list of German television related events from 1955.

== Debuts ==
=== ARD ===
- 26 November - Unheimliche Begegnungen (1955-1957)

=== DFF ===
- 2 November - Da lacht der Bär' (1955-1965)

== Television shows ==
=== 1950s ===
- Tagesschau (1952–present)

== Ending this year ==
- Kinderbücher für Erwachsene (since 1954)
