= Abdoul Thiam =

German footballer

Personal information
- Full name: Abdoul Salem Thiam
- Date of birth: 19 June 1976 (age 50)
- Place of birth: Berlin, Germany
- Height: 1.96 m (6 ft 5 in)
- Position: Defender

Youth career
- SV Tasmania-Gropiusstadt 1973
- TSV Rudow

Senior career*
Years	Team	Apps	(Gls)
1997–2001	Hertha BSC II		
2001–2003	Eintracht Braunschweig	63	(3)
2003–2005	Rot Weiss Ahlen	42	(0)
2005–2006	SV Darmstadt 98	18	(1)
2006–2008	Tennis Borussia Berlin	24	(2)
2008–2009	Hilalspor Berlin		
- * Club domestic league appearances and goals

Abdoul Thiam (born 19 June 1976) is a German former footballer.

At the height of his career, Thiam played 73 games for Eintracht Braunschweig and Rot Weiss Ahlen in the 2. Fußball-Bundesliga.
