= 1976 in German television =

This is a list of German television related events from 1976.

== Events ==
- 1 February – Tony Marshall was selected to represent Germany at the 1976 Eurovision Song Contest with his song "Der Star". He was chosen as the twenty-first German Eurovision entry during Ein Lied für Den Haag, held at the HR Studios in Frankfurt, but was later disqualified when it was discovered that the song had been performed publicly prior to the national final. The Les Humphries Singers, the runners-up performing "Sing Sang Song", were subsequently promoted and announced as the twenty-first German Eurovision entry.

== Debuts ==
=== ARD ===
- 23 February – Plattenküche (1976–1980)
- 25 February – Lobster (1976)
- 16 March – Freiwillige Feuerwehr (1976)
- 8 June – Inspektion Lauenstadt (1976)
- 27 July – Schaurige Geschichten (1976)
- 3 September – Die Unternehmungen des Herrn Hans (1976–1977)
- 4 September – Vater Seidl und sein Sohn (1976–1978)
- 13 September – Direktion City (1976–1982)
- 26 October – Die Ilse ist weg (1976)
- 1 December – Notarztwagen 7 (1976–1977)
- 2 December – Hans und Lene (1976–1977)
- 19 December – Der Winter, der ein Sommer war (1976)
- Unknown – Karl, der Gerechte (1976)
- Unknown – Partner gesucht (1976)
- Unknown – Schicht in Weiß (1976)
- Unknown – Pariser Geschichten (1976–1979)

=== ZDF ===
- 7 January – Gesucht wird... (1976–1978)
- 25 January – Der Knabe mit den 13 Vätern (1976)
- 28 January – Geburtstage (1976)
- 1 April – Der Anwalt (1976–1978)
- 7 April – Ein Fall für Stein (1976)
- 7 July – Zwickelbach & Co. (1976)
- 15 July – Wege ins Leben (1976)
- 21 July – Block 7 (1976)
- 21 October – Den lieben langen Tag (1976)
- 12 November – Notsignale (1976)
- 28 December – Michel Strogoff (1976–1977)

=== DFF ===
- 8 October – Die Lindstedts (1976)
- 31 December – Maxe Baumann (1976–1982)

== Television shows ==
=== 1950s ===
- Tagesschau (1952–present)

=== 1960s ===
- heute (1963-present)

== Ending this year ==
- Der Kommissar (since 1969)

== Births ==
- 27 December - Sabine Heinrich, TV & radio host
