= Christof May =

German Catholic theologian and priest (1973–2022)

- Christof May, in 2018
- Born: 8 April 1973; Hadamar, Hesse, West Germany
- Died: 8 June 2022 (aged 49); Eschenau, Runkel, Hesse, Germany
- Education: Hochschule Sankt Georgen; Pontifical Gregorian University
- Occupations: Priest; Educator

Ecclesiastical career
- Church: Catholic Church
- Ordained: 2000
- Congregations served: St. Bonifatius, Wiesbaden; St. Anna, Braunfels
- Offices held: Regens of the Diocese of Limburg

Christof May (8 April 1973 – 8 June 2022) was a German Catholic theologian and priest. He worked for the Diocese of Limburg, as Regens of the seminary, as Bischofsvikar responsible for development of the church, and as Domkapitular in the cathedral chapter. He advocated for changes in the Catholic Church.

== Life ==
May was born in Hadamar on 8 April 1973 and grew up in Hintermeilingen. He completed school with the Abitur at the Fürst-Johann-Ludwig-Schule in Hadamar, and then served in the Stabsmusikkorps of the Bundeswehr in Siegburg. Beginning in 1993, he studied philosophy and theology at the Sankt Georgen Graduate School of Philosophy and Theology in Frankfurt, and at the Pontifical Gregorian University in Rome. He was consecrated as a priest by Bishop Franz Kamphaus in Sant'Ignazio in Rome in 2000. He achieved the doctorate in Rome in 2004, with a dissertation "Pilgern: Menschsein auf dem Weg", about pilgrimage as a way to be human.

May worked as chaplain in Königstein and Kronberg from March 2004, and from September 2004 as chaplain in St. Bonifatius, Wiesbaden. He focused on the Kirchorte St. Michael and Heilige Familie, and developed from 2006 a concept named City-Pastoral. From September 2008, he was parish priest for St. Anna in Braunfels, later becoming dean for the regions Wetzlar and Lahn-Dill-Eder. From 2011, he was rector of the Bischof-Blum-Kolleg in Limburg an der Lahn. In spring 2018, May was appointed Regens of the Limburg seminary, responsible for the training of future priests, and Bischofsvikar, assisting the bishop in matters of church development. From 1 December 2019, he was also Domkapitular in the Limburg cathedral chapter, a group of seven priests counseling the bishop, and responsible for the services at the cathedral.

On 4 October 2020, May held a streamed service for Erntedankfest (harvest festival) from the chapel of the Bischofshaus Limburg. In his sermon, he advocated for changes in the church, such as admitting homosexual couples, and divorced and remarried couples to the sacraments, common eucharist for couples from different Christian denominations, and the ordination of women. When a parish from the Westerwald region placed the sermon on its website, it was viewed around 170,000 times.

On 7 June 2022, he met with his Bishop, Georg Bätzing, and was informed of accusations of abusive behaviour towards several people. As required by the guidelines of the German Bishops' Conference for dealing with sexual abuse, Bätzing released May from all duties during investigation and clarification of the allegations. According to Frankfurter Neue Presse, May disappeared in the afternoon on 8 June; after extensive search by the police, his body was found on 9 June in a forest near Eschenau. The public prosecutor's office in Limburg confirmed that he had died on 8 June 2022 by suicide, at age 49.

The diocese first informed its staff, saying: "The death of Christof May affects us all. We have lost a dedicated and much appreciated pastoral worker." ("Der Tod von Christof May trifft uns alle. Wir haben einen engagierten und sehr geschätzten Seelsorger verloren.") The president of the assembly of the diocese, Gerhard Glas, said that May made decisive contributions in the synodal bodies ("... in den synodalen Gremien Entscheidendes geleistet"), and summarised: "Er war ein echter Hoffnungsträger." ("He was a real bearer of hope.") The requiem was held 24 June 2022 at the church of his home-town. Bishop Bätzing wrote in an obituary that May was a well-versed theologian ("theologisch versiert"), clever and full of ideas in his care for people ("pastoral klug und ideenreich"), who promoted the Christian message with great dedication and joy. He summarised that May produced ideas and motivation, thinking first of what people needed, and was "advocating for a spiritual renewal of the Church in the light of the Gospel" ("Er war ein Ideengeber und Motivator, der vom Menschen her dachte und im Lichte des Evangeliums für eine geistliche Erneuerung der Kirche eintrat").

== Publications ==
- Pilgern. Menschsein auf dem Weg. In: Studien zur systematischen und spirituellen Theologie. No. 41. Echter, Würzburg 2004, ISBN 3-429-02617-2.
- Mit dem Rad Glauben erfahren: Firmradkurs. Pro Business Berlin, 2006, ISBN 978-3-939-53343-6.
- Jung, entschieden, christlich: Lebenskompass. Butzon & Bercker, 2010, ISBN 978-3-766-61353-0.

=== As co-author ===
- Eckhard Nordhofen, Matthias Theodor Kloft, Burkhard Jürgens: Wege des Pilgerns. Bischöfliches Ordinariat Limburg 2005, ISBN 978-3-921-22132-7.
- Philippa Rath, Burkhard Hose: Frauen ins Amt! Männer der Kirche solidarisieren sich. Herder 2020, ISBN 978-3-451-39253-5.
