= Ein Fall für Stein =

- Starring: Volkert Kraeft
- Country of origin: Germany

Ein Fall für Stein is a German television series.

== See also ==
- List of German television series
