= 1969 in German television =

This is a list of German television related events from 1969.

== Events ==
- 22 February - Siw Malmkvist is selected to represent Germany at the 1969 Eurovision Song Contest with her song "Primaballerina". She is selected to be the fourteenth German Eurovision entry during Ein Lied für Madrid held at the HR Studios in Frankfurt.

== Debuts ==
=== Domestic ===
- 3 January – Der Kommissar (1969–1976) (ZDF)
- 13 January – Königlich Bayerisches Amtsgericht (1969–1971) (ZDF)
- 29 January – Salto Mortale (1969–1972) (ARD)
- 19 March –Percy Stuart (1969–1972) (ZDF)
- 14 December – Hotel Royal (TV film, ZDF)

== Television shows ==
=== 1950s ===
- Tagesschau (1952–present)

=== 1960s ===
- heute (1963-present)
