= Alexander Haugg =

German actor (born 1968)

Alexander Christopher Haugg (born 31 August 1968 in Hamburg, West Germany) is a German actor who became known in Germany for his role in the TV series Gegen den Wind.

He was trained as an actor by former German actress, dancer and singer Margot Höpfner.

Since 2002 he has been living in Berlin and has joined several theatre and TV-productions.
