= 1974 in German television =

This is a list of German television related events from 1974.

== Events ==
- 7 July - West Germany beat the Netherlands 2-1 to win the 1974 World Cup at Munich.

== Debuts ==
=== ARD ===
- 21 January – Gemeinderätin Schumann (1974)
- 2 May – Die Fälle des Herrn Konstantin (1974–1977)
- 1 June – Lokalseite unten links (1974–1977)
- 9 October – Die Powenzbande (1974)
- 26 November – Münchner Geschichten 1974–1975)
- 12 December – Unter einem Dach (1974–1976)
- 14 December – Härte 10 (1974–1975)

=== ZDF ===
- 7 January –
  - Engadiner Bilderbogen (1974)
  - Zwischenstationen (1974)
- 12 January – Hauptsache, die Kohlen stimmen (1974)
- 7 February – Alexander und die Töchter (1974)
- 20 February – Sergeant Berry (1974–1976)
- 7 April – Der kleine Doktor (1974)
- 19 May – Hier kocht der Chef (1974)
- 22 August – Der Herr Kottnik (1974)
- 28 August – Dr. med. Mark Wedmann - Detektiv inbegriffen (1974)
- 15 October – Das Blaue Palais (1974–1976)
- 20 October – Derrick (1974–1998)
- 26 November – Die lieben Haustiere (1974)

=== DFF ===
- 2 May – Maria und der Paragraph (1974)
- 27 October – Der Leutnant vom Schwanenkietz (1974)

== Television shows ==
=== 1950s ===
- Tagesschau (1952–present)

=== 1960s ===
- heute (1963-present)

== Births ==
- 5 March – Barbara Schöneberger, actress, singer & TV host
- 22 July – Franka Potente, actress
