= 1967 in German television =

This is a list of German television related events from 1967.

== Events ==
- 25 August - Color TV was introduced. At 10:57, Willy Brandt, then Foreign Minister and Vice-Chancellor, pushed a mock red button at the 25th International Radio Exhibition in West Berlin. West Germany became the first country in Europe, and only third worldwide after United States and Japan to introduce color television. The first television show broadcast in color is game show Der Goldene Schuss, hosted by Vico Torriani. Only less than 6000 television sets nationwide were able to display color, at a high cost of 2000-4000 Marks.

== Debuts ==
=== Domestic ===
- 15 September - Graf Yoster (1967–1977) (ARD)

== Television shows ==
=== 1950s ===
- Tagesschau (1952–present)

=== 1960s ===
- heute (1963-present)

== Births ==
- 22 January - Jenny Jürgens, singer, actress & TV host
