= Rolf Saalfrank =

German shot putter (born 1962)

Rolf Saalfrank (born 9 March 1962 in Würzburg) is a retired West German shot putter.

He finished sixth at the 1987 European Indoor Championships with a throw of 19.41 metres. He represented the sports club LAC Quelle Fürth, and won the bronze medal at the West German championships in 1986 (19.24 m). He set his personal best of 19.51 metres at 3 August 1986.
