= Der Kurier der Kaiserin =

- Created by: Hans Dieter Schreeb; Hans Georg Thiemt
- Starring: Klausjürgen Wussow
- Country of origin: Germany
- No. of seasons: 2
- No. of episodes: 26

Original release
- Network: ZDF
- Release: 28 September 1970 – 1971

Der Kurier der Kaiserin is a German Television series. It was produced by ZDF and ORF and was broadcast from 1970 to 1971. German actor Klausjürgen Wussow portrays a courier for the Austrian ruler Maria Theresa in the period before and during the Seven Years' War.
