= Königlich Bayerisches Amtsgericht =

- Country of origin: Germany

Königlich Bayerisches Amtsgericht (Royal Bavarian District Court) is a German comedy television series. It was produced by ZDF in the years 1968 to 1972 and contains 52 episodes.

It is set in the fictional town of Geisbach in Lower Bavaria, a province of the Kingdom of Bavaria, in itself a part of the German Empire, shortly before World War I and revolves around the court proceedings of the local Königlich Bayerisches Amtsgericht.

Almost all actors speak with a Bavarian dialect.

The series features many famous Bavarian actors like Gustl Bayrhammer, Hans Baur and Max Grießer.
