= Stefanie Tücking =

German presenter (1962–2018)

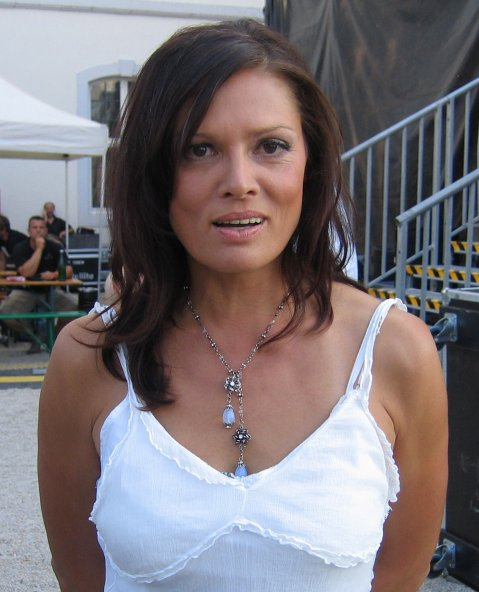
- Tücking in 2009
- Born: 1 April 1962; Kaiserslautern, West Germany
- Died: 1 December 2018 (aged 56); Baden-Baden, Germany
- Occupations: TV presenter, radio personality

Stefanie Tücking (1 April 1962 – 1 December 2018) was a German radio and television presenter.

== Career ==
Tücking was born in Kaiserslautern. She won the Golden Camera award at the age of 24 for her work on the ARD music show Formel Eins (Formula One), where she served as the show host between January 1986 and December 1987. After her breakthrough with Formel Eins, she worked for the German broadcaster Südwestrundfunk (SWR) as a television and radio presenter until her death.

== Death ==
Tücking died unexpectedly during the night of 1 December 2018 in Baden-Baden at age 56. The cause of death was a pulmonary embolism. She was found by a friend in her bed. Tücking had no known health or substance-related problems. According to her father, they visited a Christmas market on Thursday and on Friday (30 November) evening she was on air with her radio for the last time.
