= 1972 in German television =

This is a list of German television related events from 1972.

== Events ==
- 19 February - Mary Roos is selected to represent Germany at the 1972 Eurovision Song Contest with her song "Nur die Liebe läßt uns leben". She is selected to be the seventeenth German Eurovision entry during Ein Lied für Edinburgh held at the SFB Studios in Berlin.

== Debuts ==
=== ARD ===
- 16 January – Einmal im Leben – Geschichte eines Eigenheims (1972)
- 4 April – Privatdetektiv Frank Kross (1972)
- 9 April – Die rote Kapelle (1972)
- 4 July – Butler Parker (1972–1973)
- 21 July – Die Schöngrubers (1972)
- 25 October – Sonderdezernat K1 (1972–1982)
- 27 October – Fußballtrainer Wulff (1972–1973)
- 29 October – Eight Hours Don't Make a Day (1972–1973)
- 29 November – Alexander Zwo (1972–1973)
- 13 December - Musikladen (1972-1984)
- Unknown – Clochemerle (1972)

=== ZDF ===
- 26 January – Semesterferien (1972)
- 6 February – Die Abenteuer des braven Soldaten Schwejk (1972)
- 6 December – Im Auftrag von Madame (1972–1975)

== Television shows ==
=== 1950s ===
- Tagesschau (1952–present)

=== 1960s ===
- heute (1963-present)

== Ending this year ==
- Father Brown (since 1966)
- Percy Stuart (since 1969)
- Salto Mortale (since 1969)
- Beat-Club (since 1965)

== Births ==
- 25 September - Steven Gätjen, American-born TV host
