= 1973 in German television =

This is a list of German television related events from 1973.

== Events ==
- 21 February - Gitte is selected to represent Germany at the 1973 Eurovision Song Contest with her song "Junger Tag". She is selected to be the eighteenth German Eurovision entry during Ein Lied für Luxemburg held at the HR Studios in Frankfurt.

== Debuts ==
=== ARD ===
- 15 January – Ein Herz und eine Seele (1973–1976)
- 17 January – Unter Ausschluß der Öffentlichkeit (1973)
- 23 January – Lawinenpatrouille (1973)
- 2 April – Lemmi und die Schmöker (1973–1983)
- 4 April – Frühbesprechung (1973)
- 23 April – Bauern, Bonzen und Bomben (1973)
- 4 May – Neues vom Kleinstadtbahnhof (1973)
- 24 July – Klimbim (1973–1979)
- August – Ein Fall für Männdli (1973–1975)
- 21 September – Die Kriminalerzählung (1973)

=== ZDF ===
- 1 January – Die merkwürdige Lebensgeschichte des Friedrich Freiherrn von der Trenck (1973)
- 7 January – Peter ist der Boß (1973)
- 18 January – Drei Partner (1973)
- 8 April – Hallo - Hotel Sacher... Portier! (1973–1974)
- 17 April – Lokaltermin (1973)
- 19 April – Sechs unter Millionen (1973)
- 2 July – Der Bastian (1973)
- 18 July – Polizeistation (1973)
- 24 July – Der Nervtöter (1973)
- 1 October – Alles Gute, Köhler (1973)
- 17 October – Mordkommission (1973–1975)
- 8 November – Zwischen den Flügen (1973)

=== DFF ===
- 16 September – Eva und Adam (1973)
- 11 November – Stülpner-Legende (1973)
- 23 December – Das unsichtbare Visier (1973–1979)
- 25 December – Clown Ferdinand (1973–1975)

=== International ===
- 8 January - (United States) Sesame Street (1969-present)

== Television shows ==
=== 1950s ===
- Tagesschau (1952–present)

=== 1960s ===
- heute (1963-present)

=== 1970s ===
- Disco (1971-1982)
- Musikladen (1972-1984)
