= Bonn Agreement (1969) =

1969 European environmental agreement

The Bonn Agreement is a European environmental agreement.

Following several oil spills in 1969, the coastal nations of the North Sea formed the Bonn Agreement to ensure mutual cooperation in the avoidance and combating of environmental pollution.

The agreement was revised in 1983 to include the European Union and again in 2001 to allow Ireland to join.

Members of the Bonn Agreement are Belgium, Denmark, the European Community, France, Germany, Ireland, the Netherlands, Norway, Sweden, United Kingdom and Spain.
