= 1907 in Germany =

- Decades: 1880s; 1890s; 1900s; 1910s; 1920s
- See also: Other events of 1907; History of Germany • Timeline • Years

Events in the year 1907 in Germany.

== Incumbents ==
=== National level ===
- Emperor – Wilhelm II
- Chancellor – Bernhard von Bülow

=== State level ===
==== Kingdoms ====
- King of Bavaria – Otto
- King of Prussia – Wilhelm II
- King of Saxony – Frederick Augustus III
- King of Württemberg – William II

==== Grand Duchies ====
- Grand Duke of Baden – Frederick I then Frederick II
- Grand Duke of Hesse – Ernest Louis
- Grand Duke of Mecklenburg-Schwerin – Frederick Francis IV
- Grand Duke of Mecklenburg-Strelitz – Adolphus Frederick V
- Grand Duke of Oldenburg – Frederick Augustus II
- Grand Duke of Saxe-Weimar-Eisenach – William Ernest

==== Principalities ====
- Schaumburg-Lippe – George, Prince of Schaumburg-Lippe
- Schwarzburg-Rudolstadt – Günther Victor, Prince of Schwarzburg-Rudolstadt
- Schwarzburg-Sondershausen – Karl Günther, Prince of Schwarzburg-Sondershausen
- Principality of Lippe – Leopold IV, Prince of Lippe
- Reuss Elder Line – Heinrich XXIV, Prince Reuss of Greiz (with Heinrich XIV, Prince Reuss Younger Line as regent)
- Reuss Younger Line – Heinrich XIV, Prince Reuss Younger Line
- Waldeck and Pyrmont – Friedrich, Prince of Waldeck and Pyrmont

==== Duchies ====
- Duke of Anhalt – Frederick II, Duke of Anhalt
- Duke of Brunswick – vacant to 28 May, then Duke John Albert of Mecklenburg (regent)
- Duke of Saxe-Altenburg – Ernst I, Duke of Saxe-Altenburg
- Duke of Saxe-Coburg and Gotha – Charles Edward, Duke of Saxe-Coburg and Gotha
- Duke of Saxe-Meiningen – Georg II, Duke of Saxe-Meiningen

==== Colonial Governors ====
- Cameroon (Kamerun) – Otto Gleim (acting governor) (2nd term) to 1 July, then Theodor Seitz (3rd term)
- Kiaochow (Kiautschou) – Oskar von Truppel
- German East Africa (Deutsch-Ostafrika) – Georg Albrecht Freiherr von Rechenberg
- German New Guinea (Deutsch-Neuguinea) – Albert Hahl (2nd term)
- German Samoa (Deutsch-Samoa) – Wilhelm Solf
- German South-West Africa (Deutsch-Südwestafrika) – Friedrich von Lindequist to 20 May, then Bruno von Schuckmann
- Togoland – Johann Nepomuk Graf Zech auf Neuhofen

== Events ==
- 25 January – The 'Hottentot election', so called because of the nationalist atmosphere whipped up during the campaign, sees the Social Democratic Party of Germany gain half a million votes and yet lose half of their seats.
- May – A separate Imperial Colonial Office is set up distinct from the Auswärtiges Amt.
- 15 July – An experimental train is reported to reach 81 mph and reach 98 mph maximum
- 6 October – The Deutscher Werkbund is established in Munich.
  - Edeka is founded as a purchasing co-operative.
- The Herero and Namaqua Genocide reaches its climax in this year.

=== Undated ===
- Arsphenamine is first synthesised in 1907 in Paul Ehrlich's lab by Alfred Bertheim.

== Architecture ==
- Kaiser-Wilhelm-Brücke, a swing bridge is opened in Wilhelmshaven.

== Arts ==
- Oscar Straus's opera Ein Walzertraum receives its premiere.

== Diplomacy ==
- 18 October – Germany is among the signatories of the Hague Convention of 1907.

== Education ==
- The University of Mannheim is established.

== Science ==
- Eduard Buchner is awarded the Nobel Prize in Chemistry.

== Sport ==
- May – 1907 World Wrestling Championships held in Frankfurt
- 13–14 June – 1907 Kaiser Preis motor race is held.
- Freiburger FC are crowned German football champions for the first time.
- The Rund um die Hainleite cycling race in Erfurt is held for the first time.

== Transport ==
- 5 October – The SMS Dresden is launched.

== Births ==
- 4 January – Willy Busch, footballer (died 1982)
- 16 January – Martin Scherber, composer (died 1974)
- 18 January – Lina Haag, World War II resistance fighter (died 2012)
- 20 January – Manfred von Ardenne, physicist (died 1997)
- 25 January – Helmut Weiss, film director (died 1969)
- 1 February – Günter Eich, author (died 1972)
- 7 February – Kurt Hasse, equestrian (died 1944)
- 19 February – Rudolf von Beckerath, organ builder (died 1976)
- 23 February – Hans-Jürgen von Blumenthal, German resistance member (died 1944)
- 11 March:
  - Heinz Brandt, equestrian and officer (died 1944)
  - Helmuth James Graf von Moltke, jurist (died 1945)
  - Konrad Wolff, musicologist (died 1989)
- 12 March – Josef Stangl, Bishop of Würzburg (died 1979)
- 13 March – Ludwig Biermann, astronomer (died 1986)
- 17 March – Franz Kartz, boxer
- 20 March – Helmut Echternach, theologian (died 1988)
- 24 March – Josef Lanzendörfer, bobsledder
- 30 March:
  - Friedrich August Freiherr von der Heydte, Luftwaffe officer (died 1994)
  - Rudolf Krause, racing driver (died 1987)
- 7 April – Friedrich Wegener, pathologist (died 1990)
- 8 April – Walter Leinweber, ice hockey player (died 1997)
- 16 April – August Eigruber, Nazi Gauleiter (died 1947)
- 30 April – Karl-Lothar Schulz, General (died 1972)
- 8 May – Wolf Graf von Baudissin, General (died 1993)
- 9 May – Baldur von Schirach, head of the Hitler Youth (died 1974)
- 11 May:
  - Hermann Behrends, Schutzstaffel officer (died 1948)
  - Eva Schulze-Knabe, painter (died 1976)
- 14 May – Hans von der Groeben, diplomat (died 2005)
- 17 May – Ulrich Biel, CDU politician (died 1996)
- 22 May – Werner Müller, ethnologist (died 1990)
- 27 May
  - Alois Kratzer, ski jumper (died 1990)
  - Herbert Seifert, mathematician (died 1996)
- 2 June – Willy Langkeit, general (died 1996)
- 6 June – Ernst Gaber, rower (died 1975)
- 7 June – Hilarius Breitinger, Franciscan (died 1974)
- 14 June – Paul Klinger, actor (died 1971)
- 22 June – Eberhard Koebel, German youth leader and writer (died 1955)
- 25 June:
  - J. Hans D. Jensen, nuclear physicist (died 1973)
  - Hugo Strauß, rower (died 1941)
- 26 June – Friedrich Asinger, chemist (died 1999)
- 1 July – Fabian von Schlabrendorff, jurist and German resistance member (died 1980)
- 2 July – Ernst Kupfer, Luftwaffe officer (died 1943)
- 7 July – Walter Dieminger, space scientist (died 2000)
- 8 July – Otto Kranzbühler, judge (died 2004)
- 11 July – Adalbert von Blanc, Kriegsmarine officer (died 1976)
- 14 July – Maria Matray, screenwriter and actress (died 1993)
- 17 July – Winfried Mahraun, diver (died 1973)
- 13 August – Alfried Krupp von Bohlen und Halbach, industrialist (died 1967)
- 30 August – Hans Georg Rupp, judge (died 1989)
- 6 September – Ilse Schwidetzky, anthropologist (died 1997)
- 9 September – Joachim Sadrozinski, officer (died 1944)
- 10 September – Dorothea von Salviati, member of the royal family (died 1972)
- 15 September – Alfred Delp, priest and philosopher (died 1945)
- 18 September – Jakob Brendel, wrestler (died 1964)
- 19 September – Heinrich Trettner, general (died 2006)
- 20 September – Nicolaus von Below, adjutant to Adolf Hitler (died 1983)
- 22 September – Hermann Schlichting, engineer (died 1982)
- 23 September – Herbert Kappler, police chief (died 1978)
- 25 September – Otto Weiß, Luftwaffe officer (died 1955)
- 29 September – Helmut Lemke, CDU politician (died 1990)
- 9 October – Horst Wessel, Nazi Party activist (died 1930)
- 12 October – Wolfgang Fortner, composer (died 1987)
- 17 October – Herbert Böhme, poet (died 1971)
- 19 October – Paul Klingenburg, water polo player (died 1964)
- 22 October:
  - Emilie Schindler, humanitarian (died 2001)
  - Günther Treptow, opera singer (died 1981)
- 24 October – Albert Hoffmann, Nazi Gauleiter (died 1972)
- 9 November – Louis Ferdinand, Prince of Prussia, son of Kaiser Wilhelm II (died 1994)
- 10 November – Hans Herbert Fiedler, opera singer (died 2004)
- 15 November – Claus von Stauffenberg, German resistance member and leader of the 20 July plot (died 1944)
- 22 November – Gustav Adolf Scheel, physician (died 1979)
- 24 November – Friedrich Geiger, car designer (died 1996)
- 30 November – Anton Biersack, composer (died 1982)
- 9 December – Max Deuring, mathematician (died 1984)
- 12 December – Ilse Fürstenberg, actress (died 1976)
- 13 December – Theodor Wisch, SS commander (died 1995)
- 16 December – Hanns Scharff, interrogator (died 1992)
- 20 December – Leny Marenbach, actress (died 1984)
- 23 December – Georg Haentzschel, pianist (died 1992)
- 27 December:
  - Sebastian Haffner, journalist (died 1999)
  - Johann Trollmann, boxer (died 1943)
- 28 December
  - Franz Ehrlich, architect (died 1984)
  - Erich Mielke, politician (died 2000)
  - Heinz Förstendorf, field hockey player (died 1988)
- 31 December – Walter Huppenkothen, lawyer (died 1978)

== Deaths ==
- 9 January – Marie of Saxe-Altenburg, Queen of Hanover (born 1818)
- 30 January – Ludwig Woltmann, German zoologist (born 1871)
- 5 February – Ludwig Thuille, composer (born 1861)
- 8 February – Alfred Kirchhoff, German geographer (born 1838)
- 14 February – Adolf Seel, painter (born 1829)
- 17 February – Wilhelm von Bezold, physicist (born 1837)
- 24 February – Otto Goldschmidt, composer (born 1829)
- 6 March – Karl Heinrich von Boetticher, FKP politician (born 1833)
- 13 March – Fritz Scheel, conductor (born 1852)
- 20 March – Ottomar Rosenbach, physician (born 1851)
- 25 March – Ernst von Bergmann, surgeon (born 1836)
- 1 April – Johann Friedrich Jaennicke, entomologist (born 1831)
- 30 April – Julius Langbehn, art historian (born 1851)
- 3 May – Hermann Tietz, merchant (born 1837)
- 13 May – Prince Moritz of Saxe-Altenburg, nobleman (born 1829)
- 30 May – Ottomar Anschütz, inventor (born 1846)
- 5 July – Kuno Fischer, philosopher (born 1824)
- 13 July – Heinrich Kreutz, astronomer (born 1854)
- 10 August – Hermann Ende architect (born 1829)
- 13 August – Hermann Carl Vogel, astronomer (born 1841)
- 13 September – Jacob Friedrich Behrend, jurist (born 1833)
- 28 September – Frederick I, Grand Duke of Baden, nobleman (born 1826)
- 3 October – Alfred Reisenauer, pianist (born 1863)
- 10 October – Adolf Furtwängler, archaeologist (born 1853)
- 12 November – Prince Arnulf of Bavaria, nobleman and General (born 1852)
- 16 November – Gustav Hertzberg, historian (born 1826)
- 21 November – Paula Modersohn-Becker, painter (born 1876)
- 25 November – Heinrich Dernburg, jurist (born 1829)
- 30 November – Ludwig Levy, German architect (born 1854)
- 21 December – Klara Hitler, mother of Adolf Hitler (born 1860)
