= Violent Shit II: Mother Hold My Hand =

- VHS cover. ----
- Directed by: Andreas Schnaas
- Written by: Andreas Schnaas
- Produced by: Blood Pictures; Reel Gore Productions
- Starring: Anke Prothmann; Andreas Schnass
- Cinematography: Steve Aquilina
- Edited by: Steve Aquilina
- Music by: Jens C. Moller
- Production company: Reel Gore Productions
- Distributed by: Intervision Picture Corp.
- Release date: 1992
- Running time: 82 minutes
- Country: Germany
- Language: German

Violent Shit II: Mother Hold My Hand is a 1992 German slasher film written and directed by Andreas Schnaas, who also plays the film's protagonist, Karl Berger, Jr. It is the sequel to Schnaas earlier film, Violent Shit, and follows the son of that film's villain as he embarks on a killing spree through the German countryside at the behest of his demented mother, portrayed by Anke Prothmann.

== Plot ==
Set roughly twenty years after the events of its predecessor, the film opens with Karl Berger, Jr., son of the previous film's antagonist, using a machete to kill the sole survivor of a drug deal gone wrong. The film then switches to Hamburg reporter Paul Glas, who is meeting with an informant known as "Mr. X" to discuss a series of recent murders Glas believes are connected to the killing spree Karl, Sr. went on two decades ago. After showing Glas top-secret photographs of several victims, Mr. X tells the reporter everything the authorities know about the murders.

Switching to two years ago, Karl, Jr. is shown being given a machete as a birthday present by his adoptive mother, a decrepit old woman and Karl, Sr.'s lover, who discovered and buried the original Karl's remains, and took in the son he gave birth to, intent on raising him to be the ultimate killing machine in order to avenge his father's death. Sent out to fulfill his destiny, Karl attacks a quintet of campers, killing two and taking the other three back home, where he mutilates and tortures them to death for the amusement of his mother, who drinks the victims' blood and allows her son to perform cunnilingus on her as a reward for his good work.

Embarking on a homicidal rampage, and occasionally returning home to rest and be told perverted bedtime stories by his mother, Karl murders a pair of fishermen, a group of construction workers, a jogger, and a young couple. Karl's spree culminates in him breaking into a pornographic theatre, where he guns down the manager and over a dozen patrons. Upon returning home after this mass shooting, Karl discovers his mother has been decapitated, her severed head informing him "your father's back" before expiring.

In the present day, Mr. X tells Glas that the police eventually discovered the killer's cabin, which had an old woman's head and at least fifteen dismembered bodies in it. When asked by Glas if the man responsible was ever caught, Mr. X says no, and bids Glas goodbye, reminding him that he absolutely must not publish the pictures he had given him. Leaving shortly after Mr. X does, Glas rips up the photographs, deeming the story he has been told too twisted to tell the public.

== Cast ==
- Andreas Schnass as Karl Berger, Jr.
- Anke Prothmann as Mother
- Alexander Jurkat
- Claudia von Bihl as Shovel Victim
- Maik Kaninck
- Marc Trinkhaus
- Sven Peterson
- Winni Holl
- Giang Le as Gangster
- Son Le as Gangster
- A. Judge
- Lars Brinkmann
- Isabel Ottermann
- Jan Boberg
- Astrid X.
- Tanja Tittenbach
- Boris Draeger
- Dirk Bonny
- Ole Mueckenburg
- Matthias Bern
- Joachim Neumann
- Alexander Ali Reich
- Lars Laikarski
- Lonzo Karsten
- Jan Opitz
- Oliver Durke
- Andreas Rohlfing
- Henry Peter
- Torsten Stickel Stegmann
- Henna "Serial Killer" Peschel
- Matthias Muetze Beck
- Claudio Lugo
- Scotty Pampers
- Oliver Mund
- Juergen Kiene
- Uwe Depping
- Joerg Hardy Hartwigsen
- Hagen van de Viven

== Reception ==
On its page detailing the works of Andreas Schnass, the exploitation film database The Worldwide Celluloid Massacre deemed the film "worthless" and described its attempts at humor as "lame". 1000 Misspent Hours gave the film one and a half stars out of a possible five, stating that while Violent Shit 2 "actually represents a considerable improvement over what writer/director Andreas Schnaas had done previously" it is still "fucking dreadful" and "never [has] any real plot, most of the dialogue is almost completely irrelevant, and cinematographer Steve Aquilina is so hapless that he can't keep the action framed correctly even with a widescreen aspect ratio".

Conversely, Soiled Sinema wrote, "It can be nauseating, but it has a camp aspect that mocks the attitude it seems to be glorifying. This is what elevates it from something like the August Underground films. At one point the killer is carrying a corpse singing 'I am the Greatest, I am the Best' and the film ends with goofy, blood-soaked outtakes and rainbow-colored titles! The film is mostly a loose collection of gritty, fetishistic murder sequences, but told with a furious lack of artistry and pretension and sporting a bizarre, complex psychology that makes it a supreme B-Movie in my book. I actually hated this film until watching it after Giuseppe Andrews' similar work Period Piece. Violent Shit II is a fun, confessional, dirty little movie made for no one's entertainment but its filmmakers, and it works." The review ended with the summation "I enjoyed Violent Shit II. Why? Because it constantly entertains."

== DVD release ==
Violent Shit II was included in two unsubtitled, Region 2-exclusive box sets containing it, and its predecessor and sequel. The first set was released by Astro Records & Filmworks, and the second one by Independ'Or Video; both are out of print.

It was announced in 2010 that Synapse Films would be releasing the first three Violent Shit films in a DVD box set with Zombie '90: Extreme Pestilence, another film by Andreas Schnaas.
