= Eva Habermann =

German actress

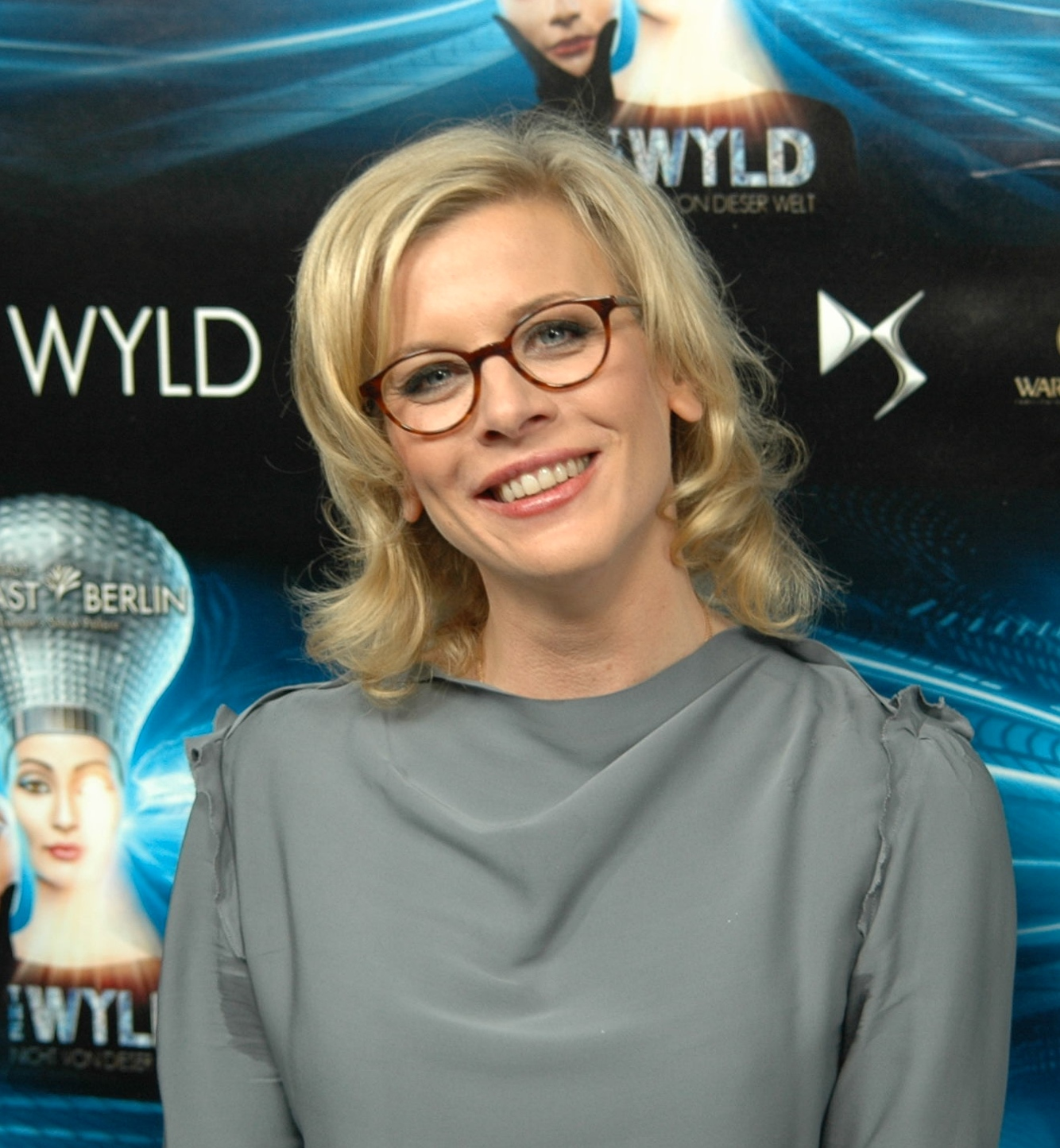
- Habermann in 2014
- Born: 16 January 1976 (age 50); Hamburg, West Germany (now Germany)
- Occupation: Actress
- Known for: Zev Bellringer in Lexx

Eva Felicitas Habermann (born 16 January 1976) is a German actress who has appeared in numerous films and television series. She is best known for playing the role of Zev Bellringer in the science fiction series Lexx.

== Career ==
While studying for her senior high school diploma, Habermann received singing and dancing lessons. Soon after graduation, she obtained her first television role in Lexx. She also moderated the children's Pumuckl TV broadcast on German television (1995/1996). Habermann appeared in the ZDF series Rosa Roth, the ARD series Gegen den Wind and the Rosamunde Pilcher film Two Sisters.

Due to the two-year hiatus between seasons one and two of Lexx, and scheduling conflicts, she was unable to commit to the second season although she agreed to appear in the first two episodes, allowing the writers to end her character properly.

In 1999, she took drama lessons and played in such German series as Tatort, Der Ermittler, Die Kommissarin and Wilde Engel.In 2005, she was in the new episodes of the twenty-year-old series The Black Forest Clinic and in 2006 she was seen in the TV movie In Heaven You Write Love Differently alongside Erol Sander.

In 2008, she played again with Sander the role of Olivia O'Rourke in the film Olivia and Jai by Rebecca Ryman. Her comedy roles included Angel Express (1999), Feuer, Eis & Dosenbier (2002) and Angst (2003).

In The Clown: Payday (2005) she played the role of Leah Diehl. She appeared alongside Xenia Seeberg, who had succeeded her on Lexx.

In 2020, she appeared in the horror movie Cyst as nurse Patricia.

== Filmography ==
=== Films ===
- Star Command (1996, TV film), as Ensign Johanna Pressler
- Hochwürdens Ärger mit dem Paradies (His Reverence’s Trouble with Paradise) (1997, TV film), as Lisa Helwig
- Geisterstunde – Fahrstuhl ins Jenseits (Witching Hour – Elevator to the Beyond) (1997, TV film), as Anne
- Rosamunde Pilcher: Zwei Schwestern (Rosamunde Pilcher: Two Sisters) (1997, TV film), as Laurie
- The Hairdresser and the Millionaire (1998, TV film), as Anna Gunther
- Angel Express (1998), as Svenja
- Tricked (2000, TV film), as Maureen
- Witness to a Kill (2001), as Monica IMDb link
- Feuer, Eis & Dosenbier (Fire, Ice & Canned Beer) (2002), as Heidi
- Jenseits des Regenbogens (Beyond the Rainbow) (2002, TV film), as Tina Berger
- Angst (2003), as Laura
- Inga Lindström: Sehnsucht nach Marielund (Inga Lindström: Longing for Marielund) (2004, TV film), as Lena Lagerberg
- Barbara Wood: Curse This House (2004, TV film), as Leyla Bolton
- Casting About (2005), as herself
- The Clown: Payday (2005), as Leah Diehl
- Im Tal der wilden Rosen: Was das Herz befiehlt (In the Valley of Wild Roses: What the Heart Commands) (2006, TV film), as Sarah Ripley
- Im Himmel schreibt man Liebe anders (In Heaven, Love Is Spelled Differently) (2006, TV film), as Emily Seehauser
- Utta Danella: Tanz auf dem Regenbogen (Utta Danella: Dance on the Rainbow) (2007, TV film), as Hanna Stetten
- Rebecca Ryman: Olivia and Jai (2008, TV film), as Olivia O'Rourke
- Ossi's Eleven (2008), as Nina Schneider
- Vier Tage Toskana (Four Days in Tuscany) (2008, TV film), as Valerie Dorn
- Germany 09 (2009)
- Bauernfrühstück – Der Film (2011), as Martha Pansegrau
- Rosamunde Pilcher: Englischer Wein (Rosamunde Pilcher: English Wine) (2011, TV film), as Hannah Powell
- Mara and the Firebringer (2015), as Sigyn
- The Terror Stalkers (2015), as Ingrid
- Rhein-Lahn Krimi: Jammertal (Rhine-Lahn Mystery: Valley of Woe) (2017), as Polizistin Elfi
- Under ConTroll: Possessed by a Monster (2019), as Vanessa Majer
- Sky Sharks (2020), as Diabla Richter
- Cyst (2020), as nurse Patricia
- Der Spiegel (2023)

=== TV series ===
- Immenhof (Someone's Garden) (18 episodes, 1994–1995), as Melanie
- Gegen den Wind (Against the Wind) (1 episode, 1995), as Paula
- First Love – Die große Liebe (The Great Love) (1 episode, 1997), as Ricky
- Lexx (6 episodes, 1997–1998), as Zev Bellringer
- Inspector Rex (Episode: Das letzte Match, 1998), as Karin Klein
- Rosa Roth (Episode: Wintersaat (Winter at the Time), 1999), as Carmen
- Die Strandclique (That Beach Crew) (39 episodes, 1999–2002), as Viola Kimmling
- Code Name: Eternity (Episode: Lose Your Dreams, 2000), as Dr. Rosalind Steiner
- Tatort (Crime Scene) (Episode: Verhängnisvolle Begierde (Fatal Desire), 2001), as Sonja Wasberg
- Wilde Engel (Wild Angel) (9 episodes, 2002–2003), as Lena Heitmann
- Der Landarzt (The Country Doctor) (Episode: Hauptverhandlung (Main Hearing), 2007), as Jennifer Struck
- Our Farm in Ireland (8 episodes, 2007–2010), as Erin O'Toole
- Alarm für Cobra 11 – Die Autobahnpolizei (Alarm for Cobra 11 – The Highway Police) (Episode: Dog Days, 2012), as Sabine Weber
