= Karl the Butcher vs. Axe =

- Film poster
- Directed by: Andreas Schnaas; Timo Rose
- Written by: Andreas Schnaas; Timo Rose
- Release date: 1 May 2010 (Weekend of Fear Festival)
- Running time: 75 minutes
- Country: Germany
- Languages: German; English

Karl the Butcher vs. Axe is a 2010 horror comedy film directed by Andreas Schnaas and Timo Rose. It is the fifth appearance of Schnaas' Karl the Butcher character, the lead antagonist in his Violent Shit film series.

== Plot ==
2023 and Karl the Butcher Jr (Schnaas) returns from hell after 25 years, and is on a mission to kill a new mass murderer, Axe (Rose). The world he returns to, however, is in devastation, with civilization split between violent factions: the Gang Loco, The Others, the tyrant Queen Scara, The Black Monks, and the nomadic Axe and his sister Vendetta, whose family history is unknown.

== Cast ==
- Andreas Schnaas as Karl the Butcher
- Timo Rose as Axe
- Magdalèna Kalley as Vendetta
- Eileen Daly as Queen Scara
- Eleanor James as She-Maa
- Marysia Kay as Mathra
