= Nikos the Impaler =

- Directed by: Andreas Schnaas
- Written by: Ted Geoghegan
- Produced by: Andreas Schnaas; Joe Zaso
- Starring: Joe Zaso; Felissa Rose; Andreas Schnaas
- Distributed by: RatPack Independent Films
- Release date: March 8, 2003 (Weekend of Fear Festival)
- Running time: 126 minutes
- Language: English
- Budget: $40,000 USD

Nikos the Impaler is a 2003 splatter film directed by and starring German director Andreas Schnaas. It follows a reincarnated Romanian barbarian (Schnaas) as he wreaks havoc on modern day New York City. It was released in some territories as Violent Shit 4.

== Synopsis ==
College professor Frank Heller (Joe Zaso) and his girlfriend Sandra (Felissa Rose) lead a ragtag group of museum patrons in a race for their lives. After a botched robbery attempt spills blood on the ancient mask of Nikos a lu Unziceanu (Schnaas), the barbarian returns to kill off virtually anyone who crosses his path. After wiping out the denizens of the art museum, the maniac turns his sights on a health club, gay bar, movie theater, and video store.

== Cast ==
- Joe Zaso as Frank Heller
- Felissa Rose as Sandra Kane
- Andreas Schnaas as Nikos
- Brenda Abbandandolo as Daisy
- Joseph Michael Lagana as Pete
- Joe Lattanzi as Ryan

== Crew ==
- Andreas Schnaas: Director
- Ted Geoghegan: Screenwriter
- Joe Zaso: Producer
- C.C. Becker: Producer

== Production information ==
- The film was shot in New York City and parts of Long Island on a budget of US$40,000 and was released direct-to-DVD.
- The name Nikos was also the killer's name in Andreas Schnaas' 1999 film, Anthropophagous 2000. Schnaas played Nikos in both movies.
- Cameos in the film include Debbie Rochon, Lloyd Kaufman, Darian Caine, Tina Krause, and musician Bela B. of Die Ärzte.
