= Feuer, Eis & Dosenbier =

- Theatrical release poster
- Directed by: Mathias Dinter
- Written by: Mathias Dinter; Martin Ritzenhoff
- Produced by: Mischa Hofmann; Philip Voges
- Starring: Axel Stein; Rick Kavanian; Eva Habermann; Herbert Fux; Christoph M. Ohrt; Thorsten Feller; Andreas Elsholz
- Cinematography: Stephan Schuh
- Edited by: Alexander Dittner
- Music by: Ralf Wengenmayr
- Production companies: Hofmann & Voges Entertainment; Warner Bros. Film Gmbh
- Distributed by: Warner Bros. Pictures
- Release date: 22 February 2002
- Running time: 83 minutes
- Country: Germany
- Language: German
- Box office: $3,070,158

Feuer, Eis & Dosenbier (lit; Fire, Ice and Canned Beer) is a 2002 German stoner comedy film written and directed by Mathias Dinter and co-written by Martin Ritzenhoff.

== Cast ==
- Axel Stein as Josch
- Rick Kavanian as Türlich
- Eva Habermann as Heidi
- Herbert Fux as Alm-Öhi
- Christoph M. Ohrt as Tronald Dump
- Thorsten Feller as Falco
- Andreas Elsholz as Franz

== Reception ==
Filmspiegel gave the film a negative review, writing: "If there's anything honest and good to be gained from Feuer, Eis & Dosenbier, it's that the trailers bluntly convey the film's quality, guaranteeing that it will appeal to audiences who find animal flatulence and booger projectiles funny. Otherwise, please, please stay home." Filmdienst was similarly negative, stating: "A dull comedy mix with slightly parodic interludes. The occasionally crude and tasteless film unashamedly promotes the culture of vulgarity and fun by primarily targeting the funny bones and base instincts of a young male audience."
