= Darren Shahlavi =

British actor (1972–2015)

- Born: Darren Majian Shahlavi; 5 August 1972; Stockport, Cheshire, England
- Died: 14 January 2015 (aged 42); Los Angeles, California, U.S.
- Occupations: Actor; martial artist; stuntman
- Years active: 1991–2015
- Spouse: Luriana Undershute (m. 2000–2003)

Darren Majian Shahlavi (5 August 1972 – 14 January 2015) was an English actor, martial artist and stuntman.

Shahlavi was known primarily for in martial arts films such as Bloodmoon, Tai Chi Boxer, the 2010 film Ip Man 2, Beyond the Limits, 300, Watchmen, The Final Cut, BloodRayne, and In the Name of the King: A Dungeon Siege Tale.

== Early life ==
Shahlavi was born to Iranian immigrant parents at Stockport, Cheshire, England, on 5 August 1972. At the age of 7, he started studying Judo in a rented acting theatre, where he would arrive early to peek at the actors performing. After discovering the films of Bruce Lee and Jackie Chan, he dreamed of appearing in action films. He began training in Shotokan Karate at the age of 14 under Sensei Dave Morris and Horace Harvey; and later boxing, kickboxing and Muay Thai at Master Toddy's gym in Manchester.

At 16, Shahlavi started to pursue a career in film and got the attention of Hong Kong action cinema expert Bey Logan in the early 1990s. According to Logan's commentary on the Tai Chi Boxer DVD, Shahlavi spent time at Logan's home watching, studying and copying martial art films from Logan's personal collection. In an interview with the Persian Mirror, Shahlavi mentioned that Logan wrote a script for him to star in, and off he went to Malaysia. On arrival, however, it became apparent that no money was in place, and Logan's partner Mark Houghton put Shahlavi to work as a stuntman. Shahlavi later moved to Hong Kong to pursue his acting career.

== Film career ==
After moving to Hong Kong in the mid-1990s to pursue a career in action cinema, Shahlavi was discovered by famed martial arts choreographer and director Yuen Woo-ping, who signed him to play the bad guy opposite Jacky Wu in Tai Chi Boxer. At the time, Shahlavi was working as a nightclub bouncer and a bodyguard for visiting celebrities.

After Tai Chi Boxer was released in Hong Kong cinemas, Seasonal Films Corporation boss Ng See-yuen and director Tony Leung Siu-hung saw potential in Shahlavi and signed him for their Hong Kong and United States film Bloodmoon (1997). The film, in which Shahlavi plays the villain opposite stars Gary Daniels and Chuck Jeffreys, remains a favourite with hardcore martial arts film fans.

Toward the end of his career, Shahlavi moved into the horror genre. He worked with German gore and splatter filmmaker Olaf Ittenbach, whose films are often banned for their extreme violence. Shahlavi starred in and choreographed fights in the films Legion of the Dead and Beyond the Limits, which are difficult to get in uncut form.

Shahlavi had done stunts in studio films such as Universal Studios The Chronicles of Riddick, 20th Century Fox's Night at the Museum and Warner Bros' 300 often making an on-screen cameo as an inside joke such as the sleeping guard who can't fight in In the Name of the King: A Dungeon Siege Tale in which he was the stunt double for Ray Liotta for the fighting scenes with Jason Statham which were choreographed by Ching Siu-tung. In an interview, Shahlavi had expressed a desire to get back to making martial arts films after completing work on a film with action star Mark Dacascos, and also appeared on Intelligence, and as a guest star on the American series Reaper.

In 2010, Shahlavi landed a major role in the film Ip Man 2 starring Donnie Yen, Sammo Hung, Lynn Hung and Huang Xiaoming, as the villain Taylor "The Twister" Milos. Although he appeared only in the latter part of the film, he served as the film's main antagonist, his boxing fight with Hung and eventual defeat by Yen forming the film's climax.

Shahlavi appeared in the psychological dark thriller film Red Riding Hood, and appeared in Mortal Kombat: Legacy as Kano. He played Devon in the 2013 film The Package alongside Dolph Lundgren and WWE Hall of Famer Stone Cold Steve Austin. Shahlavi played Cazel in the 2013 film The Marine 3: Homefront, along with Neal McDonough and WWE star Mike "The Miz" Mizanin. Shahlavi appears in his final film in the 2016 film Kickboxer: Vengeance as Eric Sloane, remake of the 1989 film Kickboxer (1989 film), along with Alain Moussi, Dave Bautista and original Kickboxer film star Jean-Claude Van Damme.

== Death ==
On 14 January 2015, Shahlavi died in his sleep at the age of 42 from a heart attack caused by atherosclerosis.

== Filmography ==
=== Movies ===
- The Turbulent Affair (1991)
- Hero's Blood (1991)
- Guns & Roses (1993)
- All New Human Skin Lanterns (1993) as Baggio
- Tai Chi Master (1993)
- Deadly Target (1994)
- Angel on Fire (1995)
- Only the Strong Survive (1995)
- Sixty Million Dollar Man (1995) as Bodyguard
- Guardian Angels (1995) as Gangster 2
- Tai Chi Boxer (1996) as Smith
- Bloodmoon (1997) as The Killer
- Techno Warriors (1998) as Twister
- Lethal Combat (1999) as Twister
- Hostile Environment (1999) as Rocky
- G.O.D. (2001) as Hitman No. 3
- Le6ion of the Dead (2001) as Peter
- Xtreme Warriors (2001)
- I Spy (2002) as Cedric Mills
- Tai Chi Master (2003)
- Sometimes a Hero (2003) as Russ Fortus
- Beyond the Limits (2003) as Dennis
- Jiminy Glick in Lalawood (2004) as Johnny Stompanato
- Summer Storm (2004) as Jimmy Ward
- Alone in the Dark (2005) as John Dillon
- BloodRayne (2005) as Priest
- Slither (2006) as Brenda's Husband
- 300 (2006) as Persian
- In the Name of the King: A Dungeon Siege Tale (2007) as Gatekeeper
- Alien Agent (2007) as Kaylor
- Watchmen (2009) as NY SWAT
- Ip Man 2 (2010) as Taylor "The Twister" Miller
- Born to Raise Hell (2010) as Costel
- Red Riding Hood (2011) as Sabre Man
- Tactical Force (2011) as Storato
- The Package (2013) as Devon
- The Marine 3: Homefront (2013) as Cazel
- Pound of Flesh (2015) as Goran
- Tomorrowland (2015) as Tough Guard
- Kickboxer: Vengeance (2016) as Eric Sloane

=== Television ===
- The Final Cut (2004) as Karim
- The Survivors Club (2004) as Eddie Como
- 1-800-Missing as Intelligence Officer in the episode We Are Coming Home in 2005
- Merlin's Apprentice as Chester in 2006
- Reaper as Dash Ariell in Magic in 2007
- Bionic Woman as Machete in the episode Faceoff in 2007
- Intelligence as Sam in 2 episodes in 2007
- Sanctuary as Ennis Camden in the episode Warriors in 2008 and Jason in the episode Pavor Nocturnus in 2009
- Smallville (2009) as Mexican thug in the episode Echo
- Human Target as Eladio Lopez in the episode A Problem Like Maria
- Metal Hurlant Chronicles (2011) as Adam in the episode King's Crown
- Mortal Kombat: Legacy (2011) as Kano
- Aladdin and the Death Lamp (2012) as Aladdin
- True Justice (2012) as Bohan Popovich (3 episodes)
- Arrow (2012) as Constantine Drakon in Pilot
- Borealis (2013) as Sergei
- Big Thunder (2013) as Clyde
- Survival Code (2013) as Sergei
- High Moon (2014) as Indian Assassin

=== Video games ===
- Medal of Honor (2010) as Tier 1 Operator

=== Stunt work ===
- The Turbulent Affair (1991)
- Hero's Blood (1991)
- Angel on Fire (1995)
- Sometimes a Hero (2003) as stunt co-ordinator
- Beyond the Limits (2003) as stunt co-ordinator
- The Chronicles of Riddick (2004) as stunt double for Colm Feore
- Blade: Trinity (2004)
- 300 (2006) as utility stunts
- Night at the Museum (2007) as a Roman Stunt actor
- In the Name of the King: A Dungeon Siege Tale (2007) as stunt double for Ray Liotta
- Postal (2007) as a stunt player
- Night at the Museum: Battle of the Smithsonian (2009) as a Roman Centurion stunt actor
- Smokin' Aces 2: Assassins' Ball (2010)
- Repo Men (2010)
- The Stranger (2010) as a Stunt actor for Mexican Cop No. 3
- Mission: Impossible – Ghost Protocol (2011)

=== Miscellaneous crew ===
- Guns & Roses (1993) as an assistant to producer
- Hostile Environment (1999) as a fight choreographer in his own scenes
- Le6ion of the Dead (2001) as a fight choreographer
- G.I. Joe: The Rise of Cobra (2009) as a motion capture actor
- Dragon Age: Origins (2009) as a motion capture actor
- EA Sports MMA (2010) as a motion capture actor
