= Xenia Seeberg =

German actress

- Born: Anke Wesenberg; 4 April 1967 (age 59); Geldern, West Germany (now Germany)
- Years active: 1994–present
- Known for: Xev Bellringer in Lexx

Xenia Seeberg (born Anke Wesenberg; 4 April 1967) is a German film and television actress. She is perhaps best known for her role as Xev Bellringer in the science fiction television series Lexx.

== Early life ==
Seeberg was born on 4 April 1967. She achieved a bachelor's degree in Latin and philosophy at university. She later attended Lee Strasberg's drama school in New York City.

== Career ==
Seeberg became known as an actress in her native Germany. Her roles include the television series Geliebte Schwestern and the horror film Beyond the Limits. In 1998 she was cast in the role of Xev Bellringer in the German-Canadian science fiction series Lexx, replacing fellow German actress Eva Habermann. She portrayed the role for three seasons and 55 episodes.

Seeberg is also a singer. She made her debut in 1996 on the EMI Electrola label with her maxi single "Heartbeat". Several of her songs, including "Heartbeat", have appeared on compilations such as Dance Fever (1996), Dancemania 4 (1997) and Absolute Music 20 (1999). She is the lead singer of the band Vertikals.

In April 2005, Seeberg appeared on the cover of the German edition of Playboy.

== Personal life ==
From 2003 to 2011, she was married to actor Sven Martinek. They have one son Philip-Elias (born 2005). She was in a relationship with the music manager Sven Kilthau-Lander from 2011 to 2014. She speaks German, English, and French. She studied theater at the Lee Strasberg school.

== Filmography ==
- Mafia, Pizza, Razzia (1997, short film)
- Knockin' on Heaven's Door (1997)
- Geliebte Schwestern (1997, TV series, 4 episodes)
- Lexx (1998–2002, TV series, 55 episodes)
- Total Recall 2070 (1999, TV series) - episode 18 "Assessment"
- Schwarz & McMurphy (2001, TV film)
- Hellchild - The World of Nick Lyon (anthology film, episode "Hilda Humphrey", 2002)
- Beyond the Limits (2003)
- Lord of the Undead (2004)
- The Clown: Payday (2005)
- So, You've Downloaded a Demon (2007)
- 80 Minutes (2008)
- Annihilation Earth (2009)
- Tatort: Der Hammer (2014, TV series episode)
