= Violent Shit III =

Violent Shit III: Infantry of Doom
- Directed by: Andreas Schnaas
- Written by: Andreas Schnaas
- Produced by: Steve Aquilina; Andrew Teixera
- Starring: Andreas Schnaas; Marc Trinkhaus; Uwe Grüntjes; Winni Holl
- Music by: Gregor Adolf Hartz
- Distributed by: Germany: Astro Video
- Release date: 21 March 1999
- Running time: 85 minutes
- Country: Germany
- Language: German

Violent Shit III: Infantry of Doom (Zombie Doom in North America) is a 1999 German shot-on-video action/splatter/comedy film by German director Andreas Schnaas. It stars Andreas Schnaas, Marc Trinkhaus, Uwe Grüntjes, and Winni Holl.

== Plot ==
A group of friends become lost on the open ocean and somehow end up on an island, lorded over by Karl and Karl Sr. Karl's metal-masked mercenaries hunt down the group, but two vengeful ninja brothers step in to help. The groups gather what weapons they can find and face off against the tyrant, his father, and their infantry of doom.

The film opens with three men, Ron, Mark, and Peter, abandoning their boat in the middle of the ocean and happening upon an uncharted island. After being captured by a gang of masked men, the three awaken to find themselves tied to crucifixes in the middle of a large militia camp. The trio are then introduced to the leader of the militia, Karl Berger, Jr. (better known to his men as The Meister). Karl and his aging father Karl Sr. oversee a series of gruesome executions before threatening the three trespassers' lives. After spitting in Karl's face, Peter is stripped of his shirt and stakes are driven through his ribcage. The two remaining friends and a traitor named Leon are turned loose in the forest to be hunted down by Karl's army of trained killers.

After Ron and Mark learn of the Meister's horrific experiments, the three begin searching for weapons. Meanwhile, Karl's hired surgeon Dr. Senius is working on a breed of hideously deformed super soldiers that are going to replace the fallen ones in battle. After being disgusted with Senius' overall progress, Karl threatens Senius with death if he doesn't have the first batch ready within 24 hours. The next day, Leon tells the men of an armory located nearby. Using handmade spears, the three kill two guards and severely injure one before taking off with their weapons. The surviving guard is punished for his disobedience by Karl when his spinal cord is torn from his anus with a large meat hook. Senius' first batch of super-soldiers are turned loose in the woods. After a run-in with the super-soldiers, Ron and Mark part with Leon, who acquires the help of two comrades named Son and Giang. After quickly dispatching the soldiers, the three look for Ron and Mark. Ron and Mark meet their ends at a small pond when a group of infantrymen ambushes them. After their corpses arrive back at the base in poor condition (with Ron's body split in half at the waist and the upper left corner of his head missing and Mark's head split in two down the middle), Senius orders that the soldiers responsible be punished right away. Karl lines them up and shoots them in the head one by one with a sawed-off double-barrel shotgun. When the third soldier runs from his execution, Karl shoots him in the kneecap. Karl then drowns him in a nearby puddle while Senius listens and licks his lips. Then Karl deploys a heavily trained gang of assassins called the Black Demons to hunt down the remaining traitors and kill them. After briefly confronting the ninjas and killing them, Son, Giang, and Leon plan a full-scale attack on the camp at sundown.

After reaching the main gates disguised as Black Demons with a prisoner, the two guards on patrol demand to know why Leon's still alive. Son and Giang then kill them both and advance on the camp. After slitting a soldier's throat, Leon steals his RPG, oversees the fight from on top of a hill, and assists the two others in killing off the soldiers. After running low on ammo, Leon joins Son and Giang on the ground below. Leon confronts a soldier wielding a machete and is impaled. With what energy he has left, Leon takes his killer's revolver and shoots him. Leon drops dead. Son hides outside of Senius' tent and slices off his nose with a sword. Senius stumbles back into his tent, where an unfinished super-soldier asphyxiates him in his open torso and subsequently tears off his head. Senius is finished when his headless body runs outside headless and Giang performs a coup de grâce with an Uzi. Both Son and Giang find Leon's body and hunt down Karl Sr. and Karl in an act of vengeance. When they are found trying to escape the disaster, the two Karls are confronted by Son and Giang, who kill their remaining troops. Son and Giang then engage in hand-to-hand combat with Karl Sr. and his son. After Son gets the best of him, Karl Sr. calls upon his bodyguard, a hockey-masked commando with a mechanical arm. After a short scuffle, Son detaches the bodyguard's artificial arm and impales him with it. Giang and Karl continue to fight until Giang backflips over him, rams his fist through Karl's body from behind, and places a hand grenade in his mouth. Karl's head explodes, and he drops a rocket launcher. With the rocket launcher, Giang tells Son to get out of the way. After Son dives for cover, Giang proceeds to shoot Karl Sr. with the rocket launcher, immolating him. The two exchange a high five before the credits roll.

== Production ==
Violent Shit III was filmed outside of Hamburg, Germany in 1993, but due to financial concerns, it was not officially released until six years later.

== Soundtrack ==
The teaser trailer for the film features the songs You Can't Always Get What You Want by The Rolling Stones and Surprise! You're Dead! by Faith No More. Additionally, a techno instrumental called Blasphemic Beats plays over the closing credits accompanied by scenes from previous Violent Shit films.

The film's soundtrack was composed by Gregor Adolph Hartz:

1. Prologue - Landing
2. Main Title
3. Senius At Work
4. The Meister
5. Guillotine Enforcement
6. Hook Guards - Face Off
7. End of Peter
8. Enter Leon - Runaway
9. Cave Carnage
10. Spear Attack
11. Ass Off
12. Dawn of the Zombies
13. Continuity Jackets
14. Marc and Ron Die
15. Ninja Action
16. Battle Action
17. Leon's Theme
18. E.R. Carnage
19. Final Duel
20. Final Duel II
21. Meister Finale
22. End of Trilogy
23. I.O.A. Animali (by Gregorius)
24. Blasphemic Beats (by D.J. ATxT)

== Connections to VS and VS2 ==
None of the Violent Shit films are connected in a linear fashion, although Violent Shit III does feature the original film's Karl Sr. (now played by longtime collaborator Marc Trinkhaus) and the sequel's Karl Jr. (again played by Schnaas). Karl Jr. again wears his trademark metal mask, while Karl Sr. appears to have become a cyborg zombie.

== Release ==
It was released in the United States by Shock-O-Rama under the title Zombie Doom. It was later released on DVD in 2002 along with another Andreas Schnaas film; Zombie '90: Extreme Pestilence.
