= Beyond the Limits (film) =

2003 film

- Official DVD Cover
- Directed by: Olaf Ittenbach
- Written by: Olaf Ittenbach; Thomas Reitmair
- Produced by: Yazid Benfeghoul; Olaf Ittenbach; Frank Geiger
- Starring: Darren Shahlavi; Xenia Seeberg; Timo Rose; Matthias Hues
- Cinematography: Stefan Biebl
- Edited by: Eckard Zerzawy
- Music by: Les Gilles
- Production companies: IMAS Filmproduktion; brave new work Filmproduktions
- Distributed by: Laser Paradise
- Release date: 23 March 2003
- Running time: 100 minutes
- Country: Germany
- Languages: English; German

Beyond the Limits is a 2003 horror-thriller film directed by Olaf Ittenbach and stars Xenia Seeberg, Darren Shahlavi and Timo Rose.

== Plot ==
A young reporter interviews a gravedigger, Vivian Frederick, who tells her about the recently deceased mobster Robert Downing and the attempt to steal an ancient relic with occult powers that ends in a bloodbath. The relic, itself, has been here since the Middle Ages and preserves a terrible secret.

== Cast ==
- Darren Shahlavi as Dennis
- Russell Friedenberg as Tom Brewster
- Hank Stone as James Flynn
- David Creedon as David Deming
- Joe Cook as Paul Pattuchi
- Christopher Kriesa as Frederick
- Kimberly Liebe as Vivian
- Natacza Boon as Annabelle Branagh
- James Matthew-Pyecha as Jimmie Levinson
- Simon Newby as Mortimer
- Daryl Jackson as Robert Downing
- Twin as Courtney
- Saskia Lange as Marianne
- Mehmet Yilmaz as Christopher
- Matthias Rimpler as Brad
- Jeff Motherhead as Howard
- Marika Elena David as Denise
- Melanie Sigl as Laura
- Thomas Reitmair as Rick
- Xenia Seeberg as Clarice
- Timo Rose as Knight
- Matthias Hues as Big Blonde Knight

== Awards ==
Olaf Ittenbach won 2003 the Golden Glibb at Weekend of Fear in Nuremberg, Germany for his film.

== Release ==
The film was released on 23 March 2003 as the Direct-to-video project.
