= Angel Express =

1998 film

- Directed by: RP Kahl
- Written by: RP Kahl
- Produced by: RP Kahl; Dieter Nobbe
- Starring: Chris Hohenester; Wilfried Hochholdinger; Dave Allert; RP Kahl
- Cinematography: Sönke Hansen
- Edited by: Silke Botsch; Matz Müller
- Music by: Claus Pieper Genlog; Olli Kuntzer
- Release date: 1998 (Gijón International Film Festival)
- Running time: 82 minutes
- Country: Germany
- Language: German

Angel Express is a German film made in 1998, written and directed by RP Kahl.

== Cast ==
- Dave Allert as Jan C.
- Sanna Englund
- Arno Frisch as Doctor
- Eva Habermann as Svenja
- Wilfried Hochholdinger as N. K.
- Chris Hohenester as Iris von Than
- Doreen Jacobi as Tanja
- RP Kahl as Patrick
- Ulrike Panse as Liv
- Niels Bruno Schmidt
- Laura Tonke as Jil
