= Premutos: The Fallen Angel =

1997 film

- Directed by: Olaf Ittenbach
- Written by: Olaf Ittenbach
- Produced by: Olaf Ittenbach; Michael Müller; André Stryi
- Cinematography: Michael Müller
- Edited by: Ulf Albert
- Music by: A.G. Striedl
- Production company: IMAS Filmproduktion
- Release date: 1997
- Running time: 106 minutes
- Country: Germany
- Language: German

Premutos: The Fallen Angel (German: Premutos – Der gefallene Engel) is a 1997 comedy horror splatter film written by, directed by, and starring Olaf Ittenbach. The film follows the carnage that ensues when a man accidentally resurrects Premutos, an evil fallen angel who takes over his body and then proceeds to summon an army of the living dead to do his bidding. The film was released with an English dub on DVD through Shock-O-Rama Cinema in 2002. It features the full, uncut version of the film and a "making of" documentary.
