= Joe Zaso =

American actor and filmmaker (born 1970)

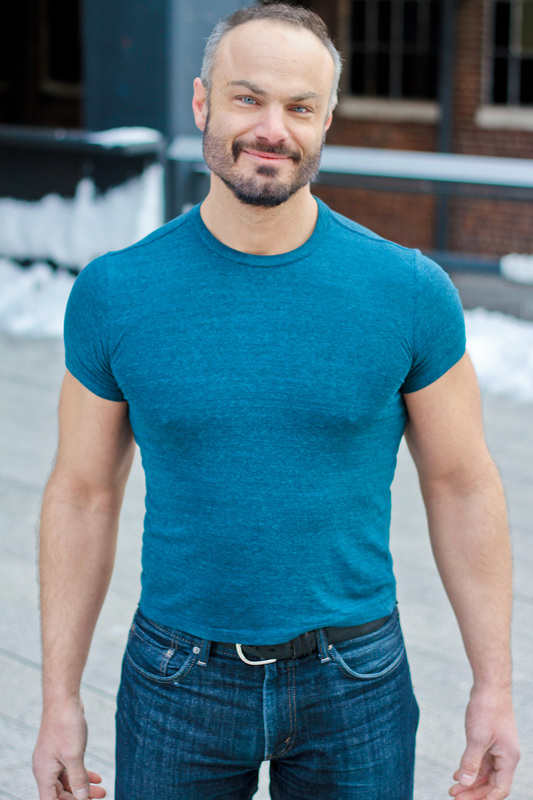
- Born: Joseph Zaso; November 20, 1970 (age 55); Queens, New York City, U.S.
- Occupations: Actor and filmmaker

Joseph Zaso (born November 20, 1970) is an American actor and filmmaker.

He is a b-movie regular and has been involved in the low budget science fiction and horror industry since 1990. Zaso, an avid bodybuilder, is usually cast as muscular villains.

== Career ==
Zaso was born in Queens, New York City. He formed his own film production company Cinema Image Productions in 1986 and since then he has primarily produced and acted in horror films. Zaso broke into the film industry with the horror musical It's Only a Movie (1990), which he wrote, directed, and appeared in. He followed it up with several producing jobs, including the Italian giallo-inspired Five Dead on the Crimson Canvas.

He teamed up with New York City director Kevin Lindenmuth on several pictures, including Alien Agenda: Endangered Species (1998), Rage of the Werewolf (1999), and Addicted to Murder 3: Blood Lust (2000). He also worked with German horror director Andreas Schnaas on both Demonium (2001) and Nikos (2003).

Zaso has also appeared as an extra in the film Dragon: The Bruce Lee Story (1993) and on the popular daytime TV series, All My Children.

Zaso also appeared in the Martin Scorsese film, The Wolf of Wall Street and the HBO Feature film, The Normal Heart.

Zaso also appeared as real-life mobster Angelo Sepe in the Fox Nation docudrama The Great American Heist which concerned the 1978 Lufthansa Heist at JFK airport.

== Filmography ==
- Screambook (1984)
- Screambook II: The Next Issue (1985)
- Maligno (1986)
- It's Only a Movie! (1990)
- Frankenstein Reborn (1993) - Short film
- Five Dead on the Crimson Canvas (1996)
- Guilty Pleasures (1997)
- Creaturealm: From the Dead (1998)
- Evil Streets (1998)
- Alien Agenda: Endangered Species (1998)
- Rage of the Werewolf (1999)
- Addicted to Murder 3: Blood Lust (2000)
- Date with a Vampire (2001)
- Demonium (2001)
- Nikos (2003)
- The Adventures of Young Van Helsing: The Quest for the Lost Scepter (2004)
- And Then They Were Dead... (2004)
- Red Midnight (2005)
- Demon Resurrection (2005)
- Angel's Blade (2006)
- Barricade (2007)
- Darkness Surrounds Roberta (2007)
- Funland (2008)
- Timo Rose's Beast (2008)
- Virus X (2010)
- BearCity (2010)
- Perry St (2010) - Short film
- Braincell (2010)
- Revenge of the Egg (2011) - Short film
- CAFE HIMBO (2011-2012) - Web-Series
- Supernaturalz (2012)
- Animal Attraction (2012) - Short film
- Can You Survive a Horror Movie? (2012) - TV Special
- The Wolf of Wall Street (2013)
- Jack Attack (2013) - Short film
- The Normal Heart (2014)
- Tales of Poe (2014)
- Mauvaises Tetes (2015) - Short film
- Hotel Bleu (2016)
- The Great American Heist (2022) - Docudrama
