= Stefan Grabiński =

Polish writer (1887–1936)

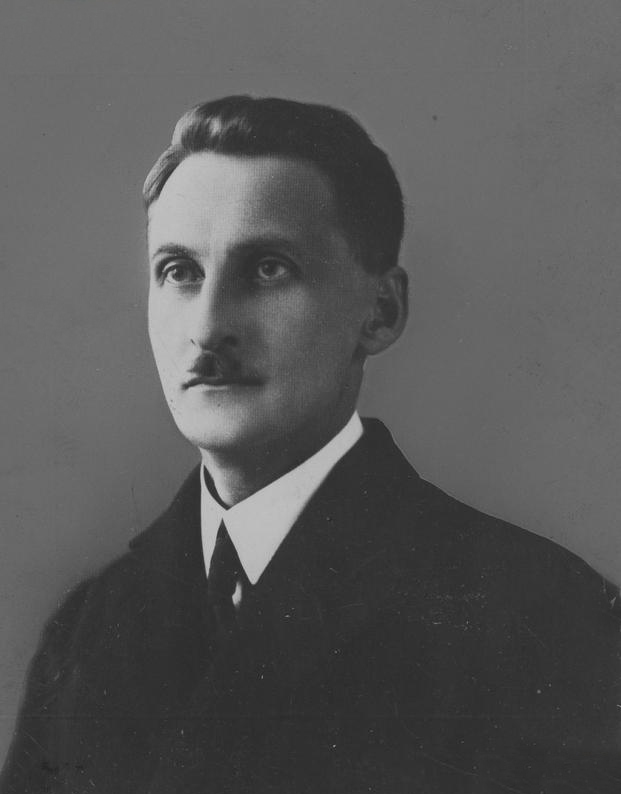
- Grabiński c. 1920–1930
- Born: Stefan Grabiński; 26 February 1887; Kamionka Strumiłowa, Austrian Galicia, Austrian Empire (now Kamianka-Buzka, Ukraine)
- Died: 12 November 1936 (aged 49); Lwów, Second Polish Republic (now Lviv, Ukraine)
- Education: Lviv University
- Occupations: Short-story writer; Novelist
- Writing career
- Pen name: Stefan Żalny
- Period: Early 20th-century
- Genre: Horror

Stefan Grabiński (26 February 1887 – 12 November 1936) was a Polish writer of fantastic literature and horror stories. He was very interested in parapsychology, magic and demonology and in the works of the German Expressionist filmmakers. He is sometimes likened to Edgar Allan Poe and H. P. Lovecraft, although his works are often surreal or explicitly erotic in a way that sets him apart from both.

== Biography ==
Grabiński was born in Kamionka Strumiłowa, then part of Poland (present-day Kamianka-Buzka, Ukraine), situated by the Bug River. His family was well off as his father, Dionizos, was a local judge, but Stefan's childhood was marred because of his proneness to various illnesses. He often read while lying in bed, which made him slightly reclusive and nurtured his bias in favor of dark fantasy and mysticism. After his father's death, the family moved to Lviv.

He graduated from the local high school in 1905, then studied Polish Literature and philology at the former Jan Kazimierz University, which is presently the Ivan Franko National University of Lviv. While a student there, he discovered that he had tuberculosis, which was common in his family.

Demon Ruchu (1919)

As he was an ardent pantheist, fond of Christian mysticism and Eastern religious texts, as well as Theosophy and demonology, this discovery only enhanced his occult worldview and approach to writing. Upon graduating in 1911, he began work as a secondary school teacher in Lviv. During this time, he also traveled extensively, visiting Austria, Italy, and Romania. From 1917 to 1927, he was a teacher in Przemyśl.

He first began to write short fiction in 1906 and his mother was his first reader and critic. A collection of short stories, Exceptions: In the Dark of Faith (Z Wyjątków. W Pomrokach Wiary), written under the pen name Stefan Żalny (Żalny means 'doleful') became his self-published debut in 1909. These tales have never been judged highly. The general opinion being that his hyperbolical, at times anachronistic literary style couldn't be appreciated by the majority of his readers. His second volume of short stories, On the Hill of Roses (Na Wzgórzu Róż), was published nine years later, and received modest critical approval.

However, this book impressed Polish decadent writer and literary critic Karol Irzykowski. They became good friends, and Irzykowski supported Grabiński's career. In 1920, Grabiński presented a collection of his mystic railway stories called The Motion Demon (Demon Ruchu). Eventually, the following collections of short stories appeared: Pilgrim’s Madness (Szalony Pątnik, 1920), An Incredible Story (Niesamowita Opowieść) and The Book of Fire (Księga Ognia, 1922). His longest prose work, Passion (Namiętność), written in 1930, was inspired by his trip to Italy, most notably Venice.

The symbolic imagery of Grabiński's works was embodied by eerie creatures, such as incubi, witches, doppelgängers, spirits of various sorts, and mysterious messages from the underworld. His fiction is usually considered bizarre because it is permeated with magic, occult eroticism, parapsychological effects, and Oriental mysticism.

A quote from his short story "Saturnin Sektor", is said to reflect his usual state of mind: "I cannot free myself from that strong, commanding voice which speaks to me, or from that mysterious power which pushes aside objects, contemptuous of their size; I am still wearied by endless monotonous roads that led nowhere. That is why I am not a perfect spirit, only an 'insane person', someone who arouses in normal people pity, contempt or fear. But I do not complain. Even like this, I am better off than those of healthy mind.”

His tuberculosis worsened and he was forced to spend more time seeking treatment. In 1931, he settled in the resort and spa town of Brzuchowice (now Briukhovychi) where, despite some recent financial return for his writings, he increasingly fell into obscurity and was abandoned by most of his friends. In 1936, he died in extreme poverty in Lviv and is buried there at Janowski Cemetery.

== Reception ==
His work was largely forgotten until after World War II. In 1949 two of his short stories were reprinted in a collection edited by Julian Tuwim. In 1950s, some of his works were reprinted, and literary historian Artur Hutnikiewicz wrote a monograph on his work. Later his stories were promoted by the science-fiction critic, Marek Wydmuch and some appeared in the Stanisław Lem Collection, published by Wydawnictwo Literackie. In an interview, Lem admits the influence of Grabiński's horror stories on his early works, including "Terminus".

In the 1980s some of his works were translated to German. At that time a number of his stories have been translated into English by Miroslaw Lipinski, first self-published or published in small press, until in 1993 they were released by Dedalus Press as The Dark Domain. Further stories of his have been translated since: In Sarah's House: Stories (2007), The Motion Demon (2005), On the Hill of Roses (2012) and Masters of the Weird Tale: Stefan Grabinski (2021).

He has been referred to as "Polish Poe" or "Polish Lovecraft".

His story "Szamota's Mistress" was adapted to film as part of a B Movie trilogy called Evil Streets.

== Bibliography ==
=== Novels ===
- Salamandra (Salamander) (1924)
- Cień Bafometa (Baphomet's Shadow) (1926)
- Klasztor i morze (The Cloister and the Sea) (1928)
- Wyspa Itongo (Itongo Island) (1936)

=== Short stories ===
- "Puszczyk" (The Tawny Owl) (1906)
- "Szalona zagroda" (The Frenzied Farmhouse) (1908)
- "Wampir" (The Vampire) (1909)
- "Pomsta ziemi" (The Earth's Revenge) (1909)
- "Klątwa" (The Curse) (1909)
- "Podzwonne" (Death Knell) (1909)
- "Na wzgórzu róż" (On the Hill of Roses) (1909)
- "Sad umarłych" (The Orchard of the Dead) (1909)
- "W willi nad morzem" (At the Villa by the Sea) (1912)
- "Cień" (Shadow) (1913)
- "Czad" (Fumes) (1913)
- "W domu Sary" (At Sara's House) (1915)
- "Szary pokój" (The Grey Room) (1915)
- "Po stycznej" (On a Tangent) (1918)
- "Zez" (Strabismus) (1918)
- "Problemat Czelawy" (The Problem of Czelawa) (1918)
- "Ślepy tor" (The Siding) (1918)
- "Projekcje" (Projection) (1919)
- "Pani z Białego Kasztelu" (The Lady from the White Castle) (1919)
- "Ksenia" (Ksenia) (1919)
- "Maszynista Grot" (Engine Driver Grot) (1919)
- "Błędny pociąg" (The Wandering Train) (1919)
- "Sygnały" (Signals) (1919)
- "Smoluch" (The Sloven) (1919)
- "Ultima Thule" (Ultima Thule) (1919)
- "Saturnin Sektor" (Saturnin Sektor) (1920)
- "Fałszywy alarm" (False Alarm) (1920)
- "Król Nenufar" (King Nenufar) (1920)
- "Cud Żywii" (The Miracle of Zywia) (1921)
- "Za rychło" (Too Soon) (1921)
- "Biały Wyrak" (White Wyrak) (1922)
- "Muzeum dusz czyśćcowych" (The Museum of Purgatorial Spirits) (1922)
- "Dziwna stacja" (The Strange Station) (1922)
- "Zemsta żywiołakow" (Vengeance of the Elementals) (1922)
- "Kochanka Szamoty" (Szamota's Mistress) (1922)
- "Strych" (The Attic) (1930)
- "Pojednanie" (Reconciliation) (1930)
- "Zmora" (Nightmare) (1930)
- "Projekcje" (Projections) (1930)

=== Collections ===
- Z wyjątkow. W pomrokach wiary (From the Unusual. In the Shadows of Belief) (1909)
- Na wzgórzu róż (On the Hill of Roses) (1918)
- Demon ruchu (The Motion Demon) (1919)
- Szalony pątnik (Mad Pilgrim) (1920)
- Niesamowita opowieść (An Eerie Tale) (1922)
- Księga ognia (The Book of Fire) (1922)
- Namiętność (Passion) (1930)

=== Plays ===
- Willa nad morzem (Ciemne siły) (Dark Forces)
- Zaduszki (All-Souls' Day)

== Titles in English ==
Translated by Mirosław Lipinski:

- The Dark Domain, Dedalus Classics (1993) ISBN 1-909232-04-1
- On the Hill of Roses, Hieroglyphic Press (2012) ISBN 1-908876-03-4
- The Motion Demon, CreateSpace (2013) ISBN 1-4664-1976-8
- Passion, NoHo Press (2014) ISBN 0-615-97850-9
- Masters of the Weird Tale (2022) ISBN 978-1-61347-289-7

Translated by Wiesiek Powaga:

- In Sarah's House, CB Editions (2007) ISBN 0-955-72853-3
- The Dedalus Book of Polish Fantasy (2006) ISBN 978-1-873982-90-7 Contains two stories by Grabiński

Translated by Anthony Sciscione:

- Orchard of the Dead and Other Macabre Tales (2023) ISBN 978-1-960241-05-4

Translated by Ian Stephenson:

- The Salamander, Stelaro Editions (2026) ISBN 979-8-2543-2688-5
- The Shadow of Baphomet, Stelaro Editions (2026) ISBN 979-8-2556-1299-4

== See also ==
- List of horror fiction authors
