= Garden of Love (film) =

- Directed by: Olaf Ittenbach
- Written by: Olaf Ittenbach; Thomas Reitmair
- Produced by: Yazid Benfeghoul; Ricky Goldberg; Leo Helfer
- Starring: Natacza Boon; James Matthews-Pyecka; Daryl Jackson; Bela B. Felsenheimer
- Cinematography: Holger Fleig
- Edited by: Eckart Zerzawsky
- Music by: Albert G. Striedl; Thomas Reitmair
- Release date: 2003
- Running time: 85 minutes
- Country: Germany
- Language: English

Garden of Love, also released on home video as The Haunting of Rebecca Verlaine, is a 2003 German horror film directed by Olaf Ittenbach and written by Ittenbach and Thomas Reitmair. The film follows Rebecca Verlaine, the survivor of a massacre during her childhood, who years later experiences visions connected to the killings.

== Plot ==
As a child, Rebecca Verlaine is the sole survivor when the members of the Verlaine commune are massacred on Christmas Eve. Seriously wounded, she falls into a coma. When she awakens two years later, she has no memory of the attack and is raised by her aunt and uncle while believing that they are her parents.

Ten years later, Rebecca begins experiencing disturbing visions of the dead. As she investigates her forgotten childhood and returns to the place where the massacre occurred, she gradually uncovers the circumstances surrounding the killings and the connection between the apparitions and her past.

== Cast ==
- Natacza S. Boon as Rebecca Verlaine
- James Matthews as Thomas Munster
- Daryl Jackson as David Riven
- Bela B. Felsenheimer as Gabriel Verlaine
- Donald Stewart as Don Creedon
- Alexandra Thom-Heinrich as Barbara Creedon
- Jean-Luc Julien as Medic
- Anika Julien as young Rebecca
- Jeff Motherhead as Roger
- Kayla Motherhead as Melanie

== Production ==
The film was shot on Super 16 mm in a 1.85:1 aspect ratio with Dolby SR sound. Holger Fleig served as director of photography and Eckart Zerzawsky edited the film. The score was composed by Albert G. Striedl and Thomas Reitmair.

Ittenbach and Thommy Opatz created the film's special effects. According to a 2026 review of the film's Blu-ray release, the production had a 26-day shooting schedule and a limited budget.

== Release ==
Filmportal records a German DVD release on 20 December 2004. The film was released on home video in several territories under the title The Haunting of Rebecca Verlaine; DVD editions included releases by MTI in the United States, 20th Century Fox in Australia and Metrodome in the United Kingdom.

Unearthed Films released the film on Blu-ray in the United States on 3 February 2026. The edition used the original Garden of Love title and featured a restoration from the original camera negative as well as making-of material, behind-the-scenes footage, outtakes and other supplements.

== Reception ==
Dennis Seuling of The Digital Bits praised the film's practical effects and performances, writing that Ittenbach made effective use of the limited budget and that the film distinguished itself from other independent horror productions.

Ariel Powers-Schaub of Ghouls Magazine praised the practical effects and editing, particularly the way Rebecca's visions and the ghosts are incorporated into individual shots. She was more critical of the dialogue and performances, describing them as uneven, but recommended the film to viewers interested in gore cinema.

A review at Mondo Digital similarly highlighted the film's practical gore and ghost effects while criticizing the performances and dialogue, and described the film as combining a ghost story with dark comedy and a murder mystery.
