= Unsere Farm in Irland =

2007 television series

- Starring: Eva Habermann
- Country of origin: Germany

Unsere Farm in Irland is a German television series set in an Irish rural location, concerning the move to Ireland of a doctor from a German city.

== See also ==
- List of German television series
