= Barricade (2007 film) =

2007 film

- Theatrical release poster by Jason Beam Studios
- Directed by: Timo Rose
- Written by: Timo Rose; Ted Geoghegan
- Produced by: Timo Rose; Joe Zaso; Ted Geoghegan; John Orth
- Starring: Raine Brown; Joe Zaso; André Reissig; Thomas Kercmar; Manoush; Timo Rose; Andreas Pape
- Cinematography: Timo Rose; Mathias Jakubski
- Edited by: Timo Rose
- Music by: John Roome (main theme); Timo Rose
- Distributed by: Cinema Image Productions
- Release date: 23 February 2007
- Running time: 94 minutes
- Languages: English; German

Barricade is a 2007 horror–splatter feature film directed by Timo Rose, written by Timo Rose and Ted Geoghegan, and starring American actors Raine Brown and Joe Zaso and Germany's André Reissig, Thomas Kercmar, Manoush, and Andreas Pape.

== Plot ==
The film follows three friends, Nina (Brown), Michael (Zaso) and David (Reissig), as they travel to the Black Forest of Germany. While there, the trio are attacked by a family of deformed mountain people who murder and cannibalize anyone who ventures into their secluded territory.

== Cast ==
- Raine Brown as Nina
- Joe Zaso as Michael
- André Reissig as David
- Thomas Kercmar as Dirk Dermot/The Father
- Manoush as The Mother
- Timo Rose as Marc
- Andreas Pape as The Freak/Sean
- Sebastian Gutsche as Goliath
- Stefan Lenger as Lillite Ceaser
- Tanja Karius as Marcy
- Ellen Tanumihardja as Tamara
- Dirk Glücks as Andre

== Production ==
Barricade was shot in Germany in 2006.

== Reception ==
Andrew Rose of HorrorSociety wrote that the story has been done many times before but never as violently, which makes it preferable to The Hills Have Eyes and Wrong Turn.
