= Timo Rose =

German filmmaker

- Rose (left) on the set of his film The Legend of Moonlight Mountain (2005)
- Born: 22 February 1977 (age 49); Rellingen, West Germany
- Occupations: Film director; screenwriter; film producer; film editor; cinematographer; actor; musician; journalist
- Years active: 1992–present

Timo Rose (born 22 February 1977) is a German filmmaker. The founder of the Sword of Independence Filmworks production company (later Germaica/Rosecalypse Films and Records), he is best known for his work in the science fiction and underground horror genres.

== Films ==
Rose is best known for his Mutation trilogy, which involves a toxic chemical created by Nazis and rediscovered in modern times. The second and third chapters in this film trilogy were re-edited in 2006 into an FX-heavy "special edition" entitled Mutation: Annihilation.

A large majority of his earlier FX work was done by German director/effects technician and close friend Olaf Ittenbach, although Rose currently does most of his own under his "Rosecalypse SFX" banner.

Substantially younger than many of his contemporaries, Rose bases much of his filmmaking on the brutality of early Andreas Schnaas and Olaf Ittenbach features. In the decade since he began creating films, he has directed more features than any other filmmakers in the German movie scene.

Since his 2004 film Lord of the Undead, starring Debbie Rochon, Rose has made it a point to film at least a portion of each of his films in English. Many of his more recent films, such as Barricade, Fearmakers, and Beast, have been shot primarily in English, with minimal German interspersed throughout.

== Inspiration ==
Rose's films are heavily influenced by modern, hyperkinetic action movies and video games. Some films even go so far as recreating scenes and character profiles from popular horror-themed video games (such as "Goldman" in the Mutation films, who is directly lifted from the Sega shooter House of the Dead 2). His penchant for practical gore effects are extremely reminiscent of the early works of German contemporaries Andreas Schnaas and Olaf Ittenbach.

== Music ==
Rose has released several rap CDs under the stage name King Hannibal and takes part in numerous live performances throughout Germany. His albums, which mix traditional rap with metal have all been successful in Germany's upstart hip hop industry. His latest music project, King and Prinzessa, was with Magdalena Kalley, his then-girlfriend who had also appeared in several of his films.

== Social media persona ==
As a journalist, Rose is also known on social media platforms, including Twitter, by the nom de plume KDM, which is short for Königreich der Monster (transl. "Kingdom of Monsters").

== Filmography (as director) ==
- The Evil Day (1992)
- Das Letzte Grab (1996)
- Die Rache des Mark S. (1997)
- Mutation (1999)
- Midnight's Calling (2000)
- Psycho Jack (2001)
- Mutation 2 – Generation Dead (2001)
- Rout City (2002)
- Mutation III: Century of the Dead (2002)
- Rigor Mortis – The Final Colours (2003)
- Space Wolf (2003)
- Lord of the Undead (2004)
- The Legend of Moonlight Mountain (2005)
- Mutation: Annihilation (2006)
- Barricade (2007)
- Fearmakers (2008)
- Beast (2008)
- Game Over (2009)
- Unrated (2009) – co-directed with Andreas Schnaas
- Karl the Butcher vs. Axe (2009) – co-directed with Andreas Schnaas
- Unrated 2 – Scary as hell (2011) – co-directed with Andreas Schnaas
- Reeperbahn (2016)
- Virus of the Dead (2018) - "Home Alone" segment
- Winnie the Pooh: Master of Puppets (2023)
- Game of Death: The six doors to Hell (2024)
- Dark Secrets: Game of Death Chapter 2 (2025)
- Bloodlines: Game of Death Chapter 3 (2027)
