= The Dedalus Book of Polish Fantasy =

Anthology of Polish speculative fiction

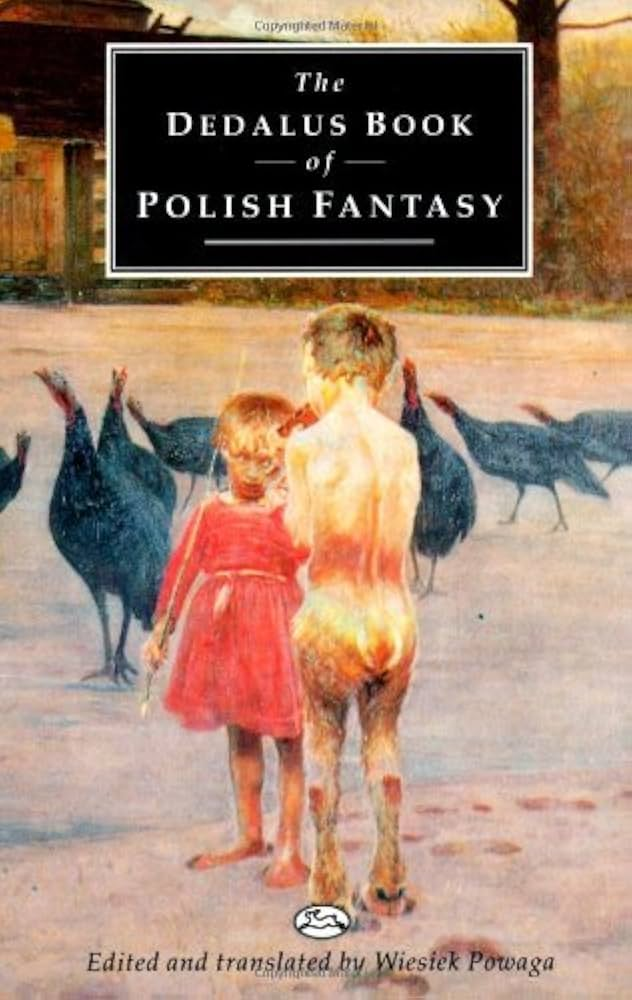
- Cover of the book (based on Sztuka w zaścianku by Jacek Malczewski, 1896)
- Editor: Wiesiek Powaga
- Language: English
- Genre: speculative fiction
- Publisher: Dedalus Books
- Publication date: 1996
- Publication place: United Kingdom
- Media type: anthology

The Dedalus Book of Polish Fantasy is a 1996 anthology of Polish speculative fiction, edited and translated by Wiesiek Powaga and published in the United Kingdom by Dedalus Books as part of its Dedalus Books of Fantasy series of European literary fantasy anthologies.

The anthology brings together nineteen selections by eighteen Polish authors, from nineteenth- and twentieth-century Polish literature, including short stories and excerpts from longer works by Witold Gombrowicz, Stefan Grabiński, Sławomir Mrożek, Władysław Reymont, Bruno Schulz, and Jacek Dukaj. It explores representations of evil, frequently through the devil or other demonic figures, in works ranging from Gothic fiction and surrealism to dystopian satire and science fiction. Reviewers praised the collection's literary range and its presentation of a distinctive Polish tradition of fantastic writing.

== Contents ==
The Dedalus Book of Polish Fantasy contains nineteen selections from Polish literature of the nineteenth and twentieth centuries. They include self-contained short stories as well as excerpts from novels and longer narratives, among them Tadeusz Miciński's Xiądz Faust, Reymont's The Vampire, Schulz's Kometa, and Jarosław Iwaszkiewicz's Mother Joanna of the Angels. Some stories appeared in English translation for the first time in this anthology. The works range from nineteenth-century historical and supernatural fiction, such as Lucjan Siemieński's The Shadow of Queen Barbara, to later fantastic and science-fiction stories by Marek S. Huberath and Dukaj.

In his introduction, Dialogue with the Devil, Powaga presents the devil and other personifications of evil as the collection's central motif. He places Polish fantastic fiction between Eastern and Western literary traditions and emphasizes its recurring tensions between damnation and redemption. The motif appears in varied forms: in Mrożek's Co-Existence, for example, the Devil pays a familiar, almost domestic visit to a parish priest. The anthology also encompasses Gothic fiction, surrealist writing, satire, and science fiction. The volume also includes short biographies of its contributors.

Huberath's The Greater Punishment, first published in Nowa Fantastyka in 1991, received the Janusz A. Zajdel Award for Best Story in 1992, four years before its inclusion in the anthology.

The book's cover incorporates an 1896 painting by the Polish symbolist artist Jacek Malczewski.

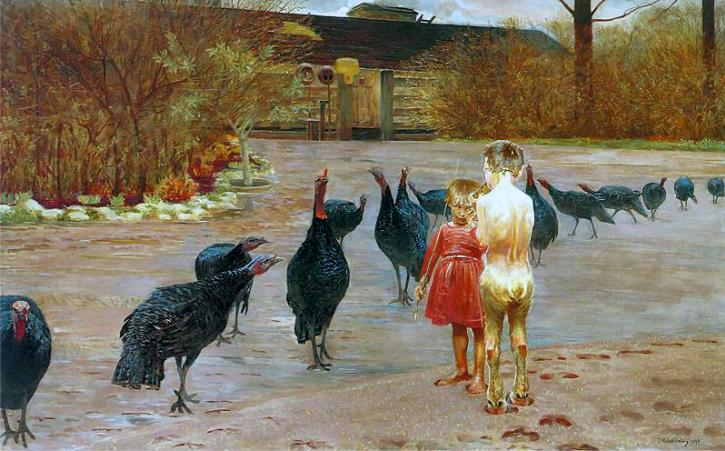
The 1896 painting Sztuka w zaścianku (transl. Art in the manor) by Jacek Malczewski, on which the book cover is based.

=== The stories ===
Sources:

- Sławomir Mrożek, Co-Existence (Koegzystencja, 1985)
- Andrzej Szczypiorski, The Lady with the Medallion (Dama z medalionem, 1972)
- Marek S. Huberath, The Greater Punishment (Kara większa, 1991)
- Tadeusz Miciński, Father Faust (excerpt from Xiądz Faust, 1913)
- Franciszek Mirandola, Strange Street (Ulica Dziwna, 1919)
- Władysław Reymont, The Vampire (excerpt from Wampir, 1911)
- Lucjan Siemieński, The Shadow of Queen Barbara (Cień królowej Barbary, 1835)
- Jan Barszczewski, The Head Full of Screaming Hair (Włosy krzyczące na głowie, 1982)
- Henryk Rzewuski, I Am Burnin'! (Ja gorę, 1982)
- Stefan Grabiński, The Grey Room (Szary pokój, 1918)
- Stefan Grabiński, The Black Hamlet (Czarna Wólka, 1922)
- Kornel Makuszyński, The Gentleman with a Goatee (Pan z kozią bródką, 1925)
- Witold Gombrowicz, Dinner at Countess Kotłubay's (Biesiada u hrabiny Kotłuba, 1928; the story's title has also been translated into English as Dinner at Countess Pavahoke’s)
- Bruno Schulz, Father Experiments (excerpt from Kometa, 1938)
- Jarosław Iwaszkiewicz, Mother Joanna of the Angels (excerpt from Matka Joanna od Aniołów, 1946)
- Bruno Jasieński, The Legs of Isolda Morgan (Nogi Izoldy Morgan, 1923)
- Wiktor Woroszylski, The White Worms (Białe robaki, 1972)
- Andrzej Bursa, Dragon (Smok, 1958)
- Jacek Dukaj, The Golden Galley (Złota Galera, 1990)

== Reception ==
The Polish folk devil Boruta, in an 1876 woodcut after a drawing by Michał Elwiro Andriolli.

George Hyde reviewed the anthology for The Times Literary Supplement in October 1996. He praised Powaga's selection and regarded it as evidence of the persistence of modernism in Polish literature. Although not all the works were modernist, Hyde argued that the anthology showed how Polish modernism had been anticipated in Romantic and Baroque writing. He also emphasized Polish literature's resistance to conventional reality and its tendency to blur the distinction between the real and the symbolic. For Hyde, the anthology's particular achievement was to bring together unfamiliar works in a variety of genres, including confessional writing, Gothic fiction, travelogues and dystopian satire, through their common concern with evil.

Hyde contrasted what he saw as English readers' greater concern with right and wrong with the more immediate conflict between good and evil in Polish fantastic fiction. He cited the everyday familiarity of the Devil's visit in Mrożek's Co-Existence and found little of the psychological rationalization of evil that he associated with Freudian thought; instead, he characterized the collection's Devil by the expression "disinterested malice". He considered the exaggerated manners of the dinner guests in Gombrowicz's Dinner at Countess Kotłubay's a forerunner of the writer's later novel Trans-Atlantyk (1953). Hyde also interpreted the excerpt from Reymont's The Vampire as suggesting a connection between exile and vampirism.

Florence Waszkelewicz Clowes reviewed the anthology for the Polish American Journal. She traced its depictions of devils and demons from Polish folklore, particularly the folk legend of Pan Twardowski, beginning with Romantic literature concerned with Poland's national suffering, drawing particular attention to Reymont's The Vampire and Siemieński's The Shadow of Queen Barbara as examples of older supernatural tales. Discussing more recent writing of the communist period, which she found increasingly fantastic, absurd and surrealist, Clowes highlighted Dukaj's The Golden Galley and its futuristic portrayal of an authoritarian organization reminiscent of the KGB and the Society of Jesus. She noted that some stories were appearing in English for the first time.

Chris Gilmore reviewed the anthology for the British fantasy and science fiction magazine Interzone. He praised it for introducing him to a distinctive but relatively isolated Polish literary tradition, observing that, apart from Mrożek, its authors had previously been unfamiliar to him. Gilmore regarded most of the selections as being of high quality, although he found some nineteenth-century Gothic stories conventional and some surrealist and expressionist pieces dated. He also identified several lapses in English-language editing. He considered temptation and the Fall the anthology's unifying themes, noting the variety of forms assumed by the Devil, including a drunken man in Mirandola's Strange Street, a beautiful woman in Woroszylski's The White Worms, and an elderly reptile in Bursa's Dragon.

Gilmore interpreted Dragon as an allegory of communism, but rejected such a reading of Huberath's The Greater Punishment, which depicts a prison camp in Purgatory without the Devil appearing in person. He regarded the seriousness of Huberath's theology, even amid dark humour, as characteristic of Polish fantastic fiction and a significant difference from Western European and American traditions. He suggested that this outlook might be connected with Poland's history of Russian and German oppression. Among the other selections, he compared the psychological horror of Jasieński's The Legs of Isolda Morgan to the work of Edgar Allan Poe, found Grabiński's The Grey Room reminiscent of M. R. James, and described Gombrowicz's Dinner at Countess Kotłubay's as a satire of snobbery and vegetarianism. He particularly appreciated Dukaj's The Golden Galley for its unusual combination of space opera, black magic and anti-bureaucratic satire. Despite his reservations about some selections and their editing, Gilmore considered the anthology excellent value and recommended it.

== See also ==
- The Dark Domain – a collection of short stories by Stefan Grabiński, published by Dedalus a few years earlier
