= Andreas Schnaas =

German director and actor

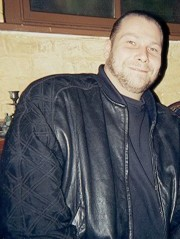
- Schnaas in 1994
- Born: 1 April 1968 (age 58); Hamburg, West Germany
- Occupations: Film director, actor
- Years active: 1989–present
- Spouse: Sonja Schnaas

Andreas Schnaas (born 1 April 1968) is a German director and actor working exclusively in the horror genre. Since he first appeared on the film scene in 1989, he has become a leader in Germany's ultra-violent low-budget horror film industry. He was one of the first in a series of maverick directors making underground movies who began a sustained revival of German horror cinema post World War II.

== Early life ==
Schnaas was born in Hamburg and embraced cinema at a very young age. Since many of the local theaters in his city did not care about how young their patrons were, he was exposed to violent martial arts, zombie films, and splatter very early on in his life. Schnaas' parents were not always pleased with his choice of entertainment, but recognized his artistic talents and vivid imagination. He used this imagination, compounded with his love of horror, to make his first film at age 12. The film, titled Hunted, featured Schnaas and his friend ruthlessly killing an elderly man, who was played by his grandfather. His father filmed the feature, as well as many other movies that the boys made over the next several years. It was not until 1989, however, that Schnaas mustered together five thousand Deutsche Mark—enough to make his first full-length feature.

== Filmmaking ==
Shot with his friends over four "extremely long" weekends, Schnaas' gory tale of "Karl the Butcher", entitled Violent Shit, went on to become Germany's first direct-to-video horror film. An immediate success, the film quickly appeared in American video stores and throughout the rest of Europe. The German government banned Violent Shit immediately after its release. When asked where he came up with such a vulgar title for his film, the director once explained that a pen pal in New Zealand once playfully told him, "All you're making is violent shit", and it stuck. That pen pal grew into producer Ant Timpson, the creator of the ABCs of Death films.

Still spiraling off Violent Shit's unexpected success, Schnaas created his homage to the undead with Zombie 90 – Extreme Pestilence (1990), the English version of which is regarded by some genre fans to have the most hilarious dubbing ever put to celluloid. The following year, he decided to continue the story of Karl with Violent Shit 2: Mother Hold My Hand, eventually releasing it in 1992. Due to an intense fan interest through his official website, Schnaas decided to continue the Violent Shit series, filming the third chapter of the trilogy the next year. Budget constraints kept the film from being released for years, but it eventually saw the light of day in 1999 under the title Violent Shit III: Infantry of Doom (or Zombie Doom in the US). Schnaas also played the killer, Karl, in all three films.

His following film was Der Kelch – Goblet of Gore of 1996, although various issues kept it shelved until 2005. As a homage to Italian director Joe D'Amato, he then remade the classic slasher film Anthropophagous, changing the title to Anthropophagous 2000 (1999). It was also in 1999 that Schnaas began preparing for his next film, which he would release as his "millennium shocker". The movie, Demonium (2001), was his first 35 mm project, made with completely professional actors and shot in English.

In 2003 Schnaas directed his first film in the United States, Nikos, featuring Joe Zaso and Felissa Rose. After that, he created the zombie action film Don't Wake the Dead (2006) and, in 2009, directed two films with fellow German auteur Timo Rose—Unrated and Karl vs Axe—the latter of which being the latest chapter in his Violent Shit series.

At least one of his regular collaborators has gone on to mainstream success in the horror genre. Writer-director Ted Geoghegan, whose We Are Still Here became one of 2015's most critically acclaimed horror films, wrote his first two screenplays with Schnaas.

== Filmography ==
- Gejagt (1984)
- Blutiger Vollmond (1985)
- Horror Game (1988)
- Violent Shit (1989) – director/actor
- Zombie '90: Extreme Pestilence (1991) – director/actor
- Violent Shit II: Mother Hold My Hand (1992) – director/actor
- Goblet of Gore (1996) – director
- Diabolica (1999) – actor
- Mutation (1999) – actor
- Violent Shit III: Infantry of Doom (1999) – director/actor
- Anthropophagous 2000 (1999) – director/actor
- Dämonenbrut (2000) – actor
- Midnight's Calling (2000) – actor
- Demonium (2001) – director
- Fog² – Revenge of the Executed (2002) – actor
- Parts of the Family (2003) – actor
- Nikos (2003) – director/actor
- Don't Wake the Dead (2006) – director
- Unrated (2009) – co-director (with Timo Rose)/actor
- Angel of Death 2: The Prison Island Massacre (2009) – actor
- Karl the Butcher vs. Axe (2010) – co-director (with Timo Rose)/actor
- Necronos – Tower of Doom (2010) – actor
- Game Over (2010) – actor
- The 4th Reich (2011) – actor
- Unrated II (2011) – co-director (with Timo Rose)
- The Suffering of Monique (2024)
