= Evil Streets =

- Directed by: Terry R. Wickham & Joseph F. Parda
- Written by: Terry R. Wickham; Joseph F. Parda; Michael Thomas-Knight
- Produced by: Terry R. Wickham; Joe Zaso; Joseph F. Parda; Michael Thomas-Knight
- Starring: SaRenna Lee, Joe Zaso, Tina Krause
- Music by: Jay Alvino; Hollis Higgins
- Production companies: Cinema Image Productions; Knight Productions
- Distributed by: MantaRay Pictures
- Release date: April 17, 1998
- Running time: 72 minutes
- Country: United States
- Language: English

Evil Streets is a 1998 American B movie indy horror film co-directed by Terry R. Wickham and Joseph F. Parda, starring SaRenna Lee, Joe Zaso, and Tina Krause. The film is a horror anthology focused around three tales of urban terror, desire, and hell in New York City.

The film is best known for the appearance of the large breasted adult model SaRenna Lee, and the film marked Lee's mainstream acting debut.

== Plot ==
The first story ("The Downfall of Johnny Garrett") begins with a young lady named "Sheila" (Nicole Bryl) getting revenge on street thug "Johnny Garrett" (Steve Rodriguez), who raped her, by contacting the spirit of her dead friend "Wendy" (Hillary Epstein).

The second tale ("Szamota's Mistress") concerns an obsessed man named "Jerry Szamota" (Joe Zaso) who carries out his infatuation with "Jane K." (Tina Krause) to a maddening degree of love. The segment is based on short story of the same name by Polish author Stefan Grabiński (Kochanka Szamoty, eng. Szamota's Mistress).

The last episode ("Stalk") stars big-bust model (SaRenna Lee) as exotic dancer "Misty", who becomes the stalking target of a muscular fanatic (David Greggo).

== Cast ==
- SaRenna Lee - "Misty"
- Joe Zaso - "Jerry Szamota"
- Tina Krause - "Jane K."
- Nicole Bryl - "Sheila"
- (Long Island rock band Voodoo Storm vocalist) Steve Rodriguez - "Johnny Garrett", a 1970s-style gang leader
- body builder David Greggo - "The Man"
- John Leone - "Jack/Club owner"

== Production ==
=== Development and themes ===
In 1996, guitarist/author Michael Knight asked Terry Wickham if he would be interested in directing a short film based on a short story Knight had written called “The Downfall of Johnny Garrett”. Two years prior, Wickham had directed a music video for Knight’s song “The Phoenix” off his album called "Dreamscapes". Knight’s idea was that there was evil on the streets of the city, and he wanted to represent it with three films. Knight's short story was adapted for film, and the original story only had two lines of dialogue in it. It ended up being filmed as a short, 15-minute segment in Evil Streets. The original story was themed like an old DC horror comics tale, a simple revenge story with a lot of visual aspects to it. Wickham's inspiration for one scene's shot in “The Downfall of Johnny Garrett” came from John Carpenter’s The Fog.

One of the portions of the film came from Wickham’s friend Joseph F. Parda, who Wickham knew as a manager at a video rental store in Carle Place, New York. Parda would go on to work with producer/actor Joe Zaso and indie horror film star Tina Krause to create the David Lynch-like episode “Szamota’s Mistress.”

=== Pre-production ===
Wickham had wanted to work with big-bust star SaRenna Lee on a feature film called Perishing Hearts after seeing her in Score Magazine, and he "made it clear to SaRenna he wouldn’t write one word without her coming onboard, because she was the only person he’d make the movie with". Lee then agreed to do the film.

Open auditions were held at Mr. Electric Studios in Massapequa on October 25, 1996 for “The Downfall of Johnny Garrett”, which is where Wickham cast Steve Rodriguez. Wickham had already worked with Rodriguez, having directed Rodriguez's band’s “Fetish” music video.

=== Filming ===
Wickham directed two episodes (“The Downfall of Johnny Garrett” and “Stalk”) and Parda directed “Szamota’s Mistress” (with Joe Zaso serving as producer) in the anthology.

The segment “The Downfall of Johnny Garrett” was shot in eight days in Bellerose, Deer Park, East Meadow, Garden City, Queens Village, Massapequa, Merrick, Stonybrook, Uniondale, Wantagh, and New York City, New York, with the first night of shooting being on October 18, 1996. Scenes were filmed under the Bellerose Train Station on October 28, 1996, in an industrial park in Garden City Park (after the production had gotten kicked out of Roosevelt Raceway), at Hillary Epstein’s residence in Deer Park, NY on November 3, 1996, behind Mr. Electric Studios in Massapequa, NY on November 2, 1996, and behind Michael Knight's (at the time) music studio in Massapequa, NY. The crew had to utilize some unorthodox lighting by using lights that were actually powered by car batteries in some scenes, since they had little to no access to the electric grid. The crew was actually cut in half early on in the filming in order to minimize drawing the attention of the local police while shooting.

Two of Michael Knight's friends (John Hoelzer & Ben Guzik) set up props and did the arm and bone prosthetics for an "arm chop" that occurs in “The Downfall of Johnny Garrett” and helped with lighting and as a production assistant respectively. Special effects artist Craig Lindberg set up the blood pump for the "arm chop", and Jason Alvino did the dead woman’s make up.

The shoot for the rest of the movie was in 1997, and publicity photos were shot in an industrial park in Garden City Park, New York. One set ("Misty's Dressing Room") was actually built inside Wickhams's in-law's garage in Massapequa, New York. The climax scene of "Stalk" was filmed in Cold Spring Harbor High School's basement.

"Szamota's Mistress" was filmed in black & white.

== Release ==
The movie's Spring 1998 premiere was held at the Malverne Cinema 4 Theatre in Malverne, New York, and the movie appeared at the 1998 Chiller Theatre Convention, where some of the cast and crew were interviewed for a local cable television show.

== Critical response ==
=== Audience response ===
The movie has received widely-varying reviews online, and the film has some gore in each part of the anthology, with the last of the three stories having a good deal of nudity.

== Home media ==
The movie was produced directly-to-VHS and sold by mail order for two years following its release.
