= The Dark Domain =

1933 short story collection by Stefan Grabiński

- Editor: Miroslaw Lipinski
- Language: English
- Genre: speculative fiction
- Publisher: Dedalus Books
- Publication date: 1993
- Publication place: United Kingdom
- Media type: short story collection

The Dark Domain is a 1993 short story collection by Stefan Grabiński, translated to English by Miroslaw Lipinski and published in the United Kingdom by Dedalus Books for their Dedalus European Classics series.

== Contents ==
The book marked the first time Grabiński's works were published in English, (Note: While The Dark Domain has been called Grabiński's debut in English, it is more correct to say this was his debut in a major press. Lipinski begun translating Grabiński's works in 1980s and self-published his first two translations of his stories - "The Area" and "Strabismus" - in 1986, in The Grabiński Reader, a work described as "a home-printed journal". Subsequently he published more of his translations in that format, as well as in what Jarvis described as "small press anthologies".) over 60 years after his death. (Note: Grabiński died in 1936.) It has no direct Polish language analog as the selection of 11 stories (published between 1918 and 1922) was original to this 1993 collection. The book also contains an introduction by the translator and editor (Miroslaw Lipinski) and an afterward essay by Madeleine Johnson.

Three years later Deadalus Books also published The Dedalus Book of Polish Fantasy, an English language anthology containing two other stories by Grabiński, neither of which was present in The Dark Domain.

The stories in the volume include:

- "A Tale of the Gravedigger" ("Opowieść o grabarzu (Gawęda zaduszna)", 1918)
- "Fumes" ("Czad", 1919)
- "In the Compartment" ("W przedziale", 1919)
- "Saturnin Sektor" ("Saturnin Sektor", 1920)
- "Szamota's Mistress" ("Kochanka Szamoty (Kartki ze znalezionego pamiętnika)", 1919)
- "Strabismus" ("Zez", 1918)
- "The Area" ("Dziedzina", 1918)
- "The Glance" ("Spojrzenie", 1921)
- "The Motion Demon" ("Demon ruchu", 1919)
- "The Wandering Train" ("Błędny pociąg (Legenda kolejowa)", 1919)
- "Vengeance of the Elementals" ("Zemsta żywiołaków", 1922)

== Reception ==
China Miéville reviewed the collection for The Guardian. He called reading the book a "revelatory experience" of reading works by an author who "is shockingly undertranslated", and commended the translator for rendering the author's "intense style... without contortions or stiltedness". Regarding Grabiński's stories, he noted they are "so contemporary, so trendy", effectively postmodernist, pointing to "fluid gender identities, the discombobulated subject, schizophrenic time". He drew attention to four specific stories out of eleven contained in the volume. He described "The Wandering Train", about a rogue, roaming train, as one of the best stories in the collection and "The Area", about the materialization of writers' fantasies - as Grabiński's "most celebrated story". About "The Glance", in which scarred protagonist is cursed with too-precise seeing, he wrote that "Nowhere is [a] commonplace materiality more brilliantly made strange" than in that story. He also commented on the issue of sexuality, referring to the writer's directness in seeing the train as "unsubtle phallic symbols", and addressing "the sexuality of train travel", seen "In the Compartment" story. He concluded by writing that "We, connoisseurs of the weird, demand Grabinski's collected works, in English".

David James Buckley, writing for The Observer, noted that "alternative selves claw at awkwardly maintained sanity in the horrific psychological fantasies" featured in the stories present in the volume, which offer "the pleasure of myths we can crack and skillfully chilling denouements".

Charles de Lint writing for The Magazine of Fantasy and Science Fiction commented that in the stories presented here, the "sense of time and place is evocatively rendered, while losing none of its relevance to a contemporary audience". He suggested that Grabiński's prose "will appeal to those who admire the work of Poe, Aickman and Clark Ashton Smith".

Eileen Tollett briefly commented on the volume in the review section of the journal Translation Review calling the selection exciting, and an introduction for "English readers to one of Europe's important authors of fiction".

Brian Stableford reviewed it in his book News of the Black Feast and Other Random Reviews, seeing it as a collection of psychological horror stories. For the best stories in the collection, he selected "Saturnin Sektor", which deals with theories of time, as well as "Strabismus" and the "Vengeance of the Elementals” (about firemen). He concludes that despite translation problems, "there is ample evidence in this volume... to demonstrate that Grabinski was a highly accomplished writer, whose work certainly deserves to be firmly established within the canon of supernatural greats."

While Stableford found fault with the translation, which he felt was poor, Stefan Dziemianowicz in his review for The New York Review of Science Fiction, positively commented on the quality of translation.

The book also received an entry by Timothy J. Jarvis in Matt Cardin's encyclopedia Horror Literature through History, who noted that the book "received extremly [sic?] positive reviews, especially in the weird fiction scene".

Additional reviews were penned by Robert M. Price for the Crypt of Cthulhu, and Douglas E. Winter for Worlds of Fantasy & Horror, among others.

== Analysis ==
Neil Barron included this collection in his 1999 book (Fantasy and horror: a critical and historical guide to literature, illustration, film, TV, radio, and the Internet), writing that the short stories presented here reflect the philosophical thinking of the era of their origins. According to Barron, "the power of Grabinski’s fiction resides in its delineation of obsessive characters" and their "psychologically rich treatments", as well as in his "renderings of a dark Gothic landscape that is both internal and external".

John Clute writing for The Encyclopedia of Fantasy noted that Grabiński "was personally obsessed by trains – at least one tale in The Dark Domain unmistakably sexualizes their thrust and motion". Stableford referred to the story in question (“In the Compartment”) as "fervently erotic". Likewise, Miéville observed that Grabiński's focus is on the fear caused by modernity and that "his trains are bloated with meaning". Barron likewise noted that the stories demonstrate the author's "opposition to mechanism and determinism".

According to Stableford, "the most striking features of the work... are the author's obsessively repetitive use of doppelgänger figures and his fascination with trains", noting, in the context of the former, the recurring motif of how the stories protagonists have to deal with personifications of their personalities. He also observed that Grabowski has little sympathy for his characters, whose suffering and doom are a form of "poetic justice", although it is not always clear what crimes they committed. Some critics, as well as the translator of the stories, see influences of Henri Bergson in them; however Stableford writes that there are other influences in play, although he as well acknowledges Bergson's influence (which he sees as particularly prominent in the “Saturnin Sektor“). Lipinski also talks about influences of Heraclitus, Plato and Maurice Materlinck.

Jarvis commented on "The Area", seeing its protagonist as an alter ego of Grabiński, a commentary on his own writing style, and perhaps even an expression of fear concerning the process of creating fiction.

Tollett saw the stories as based in the Polish Catholic tradition, which "engendered in its literature a lively awareness of the Devil and a love of the supernatural and the fantastic". Lipinski, however, wrote that "Grabinski tended to stay away from using the rich Polish folklore tradition... his eyes were turned toward the West rather than the East", and his references are pan-European rather than Polish or Slavic.

== See also ==
- Polish speculative fiction
