= Anthropophagous 2000 =

1999 film

- DVD released by Laser Paradise
- Directed by: Andreas Schnaas
- Written by: Karl-Heinz Geisendorf
- Screenplay by: Karl-Heinz Geisendorf
- Story by: Karl-Heinz Geisendorf
- Based on: Antropophagus by Joe D'Amato and George Eastman
- Produced by: Sonja Schnaas
- Starring: Oliver Sauer; Cornelia De Pablos; Andreas Stoek; Sybille Kohlhase; Achim Kohlhase
- Cinematography: Marc Trinkhaus
- Edited by: Karl-Heinz Geisendorf; Marc Trinkhaus
- Music by: Marc Trinkhaus
- Production company: Anthroproject
- Distributed by: Astro Distribution
- Release date: 9 April 1999 (Germany)
- Running time: 78 minutes
- Country: Germany
- Language: German

Anthropophagous 2000 is a 1999 German horror film directed by Andreas Schnaas and written by Karl-Heinz Geisendorf. It is a remake of Antropophagus, a 1980 Italian horror film written and directed by Joe D'Amato and co-written by George Eastman. A direct-to-video release, the film stars Oliver Sauer, Cornelia De Pablos, Andreas Stoek, Sybille Kohlhase, and Achim Kohlhase as a group of friends who, while on vacation in the Italian countryside, are hunted by Nikos Karamanlis, a mad cannibalistic killer played by Schnaas.

== Plot ==
While out yachting, Nikos Karamanlis is stranded at sea with his pregnant wife, Martha, and their daughter, Vicky. After Vicky dies of injuries she sustained while their ship was sinking, Nikos attempts to convince Martha they should cannibalize her body to ensure their own survival. Martha violently objects and, during a struggle, Nikos accidentally stabs her. Nikos eats his wife's and daughter's bodies, which allows him to survive long enough for his raft to float back to his hometown, a village on the outskirts of Borgo San Lorenzo, in Tuscany, Italy. Driven insane by guilt over his actions, Nikos moves into a cave and becomes a serial killer, murdering and consuming people with the reluctant aid of his sister, Irena.

Nikos wipes out his entire village and begins targeting outsiders, including a vacationing couple, Mary and Stuart, and a pair of campers named Hank and Allan. Mary and Stuart's friends, Georg Stockmann, Rita, Marc, Vincent, and Caroll, experience trouble with their RV just outside the village, which they find abandoned except for scattered corpses, Mary's blind sister, Auriet, and Irena, who, while fleeing from Georg, leaves behind the written message, "Go away." Nikos kills Vincent, brings Caroll to his cave, and moves the RV while Irena commits suicide in front of Georg, Rita, Marc, and Auriet.

Georg finds Nikos's journal, and while he is reading it, Carroll's husband, a surgeon named Stan, arrives in the village and is greeted by Marc. The two men go off in search of Carroll. Nikos kills Marc and follows Stan to the cave, where he reveals his traumatic past to Stan and Carroll before killing them, cutting the latter open with a rock and tearing out and eating her and Stan's unborn child. Nikos kills Auriet and Rita and gets into a fight with Georg. After Georg shoots him several times in the torso, Nikos, in a fit of madness, rips out and gnaws on his own innards before trying to drown Georg. While dunking Georg in a pool, Nikos is overcome by visions of Martha and is overpowered by Georg, who beats and decapitates him with a shovel as the suicidal Nikos pleads with Georg to "release me."

An unknown amount of time later, an Interpol agent named Doctor Steven Bauers is brought to Nikos's cave after being informed by two fellow agents they have still not located Georg. Bauers finds Georg's cellphone and Nikos's journal, which chronicles everything up until Nikos was killed by Georg. As Bauers wonders how the journal got into the cave and who added the extra entries to it, he is shot in the face by an unseen assailant, presumably Georg.

== Cast ==
- Oliver Sauer as Georg Stockmann
- Cornelia De Pablos as Rita
- Andreas Stoek as Marc
- Sybille Kohlhase as Auriet/Irena Karamanlis
- Achim Kohlhase as Doctor Stan
- André Sobottka as Vincent
- Britt B. as Caroll
- Cordula Krüger as Martha Karamanlis
- Sandra Berg as Vicky Karamanlis
- Dirk Thies as Vagabound
- Joe Neumann as Doctor Steven Bauers
- Jens Bauhuf as Agent Marsh Güldenbaum
- Bernd Meissner as 1st Interpol Agent
- Carsten De Jonge as Hank
- Karl-Heinz Geisendorf as Allan
- Maja Carstens as Mary
- Sven Carstens as Stuart
- Andreas Schnaas as Nikos Karamanlis

== Reception ==
While Sean Leonard of Horror News criticized the film's technical aspects, dialogue, and numerous plot holes, he concluded, "Anthropophagous 2000 is not going to change the world of film, or even the world of horror. But, much like Goblet of Gore, it is non-stop splatter and gore and non-stop fun." Similarly, Ian Jane of Rock! Shop! Pop!, despite being critical of the film's acting and lack of atmosphere, wrote, "This won't win over those who can't get into what Schnaas has been doing for the better part of the last quarter of a century but for those who do, or just anyone who appreciates low budget gore filled goofiness, this is a pretty fun watch."

Sam Kench of Looper dismissed the film as "the definition of a disposable exploitation cash grab" in which "a high level of effort cannot be found."
