= Zev Bellringer =

Fictional character from TV series Lexx

- Lexx character
- First appearance: "I Worship His Shadow"
- Last appearance: "Yo Way Yo"
- Created by: Paul Donovan
- Portrayed by: Eva Habermann (season 1); Xenia Seeberg (seasons 2-4)

In-universe information
- Gender: Female
- Occupation: Love slave
- Significant other: Kai
- Nationality: From planet B3K

Zev Bellringer (later known as Xev Bellringer) is a fictional character from the science fiction television series Lexx. The character was portrayed by two main actresses during the series' run, and the character had three distinct incarnations. Zev was briefly played in the pilot episode by Lisa Hynes, before transforming into a form portrayed by German actress Eva Habermann. Habermann played Zev for the entirety of season one and the first two episodes of season two before departing the series, and was subsequently replaced by Xenia Seeberg.

== Background ==
Zev was born on the planet B3K, where she was sold by her parents to the Wife Bank. During her initial years, Zev was raised by computers that taught her to become a perfect wife. As a result, the character became overweight and was rejected by her bridegroom. Zev was then sentenced to become a love slave by being run through a device called the Lusticon, intended to transform her into a beautiful and brainless servant. Before the process could be successfully completed, a carnivorous reptile called a cluster lizard attempted to eat her but was fused to her DNA in the process. This enabled Zev to free herself. She then substituted the detached robot head of a 790 robot in the machine to be subjected to brainwashing. This prompted the robot to fall in love with her.

Zev's character died early in the second season in the episode "Terminal", but was re-animated in the next episode by the character Lyekka as a present for Stanley Tweedle. The character was renamed Xev (the pronunciation remaining the same) and was thereafter portrayed by a different actress, Xenia Seeberg. During the series' run the character has had feelings for Kai, which remained unrequited throughout the series. Seeberg has described the character as being one of the more moral characters of the show, but that her aspect as a potential love slave still factored heavily into the character's motivations.

After her transformation in the first episode, the character has the ability to transform into a cluster lizard. Cluster lizards are very vicious reptilian creatures resembling centipedes that can curl up into a wheel-like shape and travel at considerable speeds. Otherwise they resemble by appearance a small Sandworm. They reproduce in mating cycles every seven years and are used as a form of capital punishment by His Divine Shadow.
