= Black Past (film) =

1989 West German splatter film

- Home video cover
- Directed by: Olaf Ittenbach
- Written by: Olaf Ittenbach
- Starring: Olaf Ittenbach; Andrea Arbter; André Stryi
- Release date: 1989
- Running time: 85 minutes
- Country: West Germany
- Language: German
- Budget: DM 10,000 (est.)

Black Past is a 1989 West German splatter film written and directed by Olaf Ittenbach. A shot-on-video film produced on an estimated budget of DM 10,000, its plot follows Tommy (Ittenbach), a young man who encounters a cursed mirror.

== Reception ==
A reviewer for Filmdienst gave the film a negative review.
