= Sanna Englund =

German actress and model (born 1975)

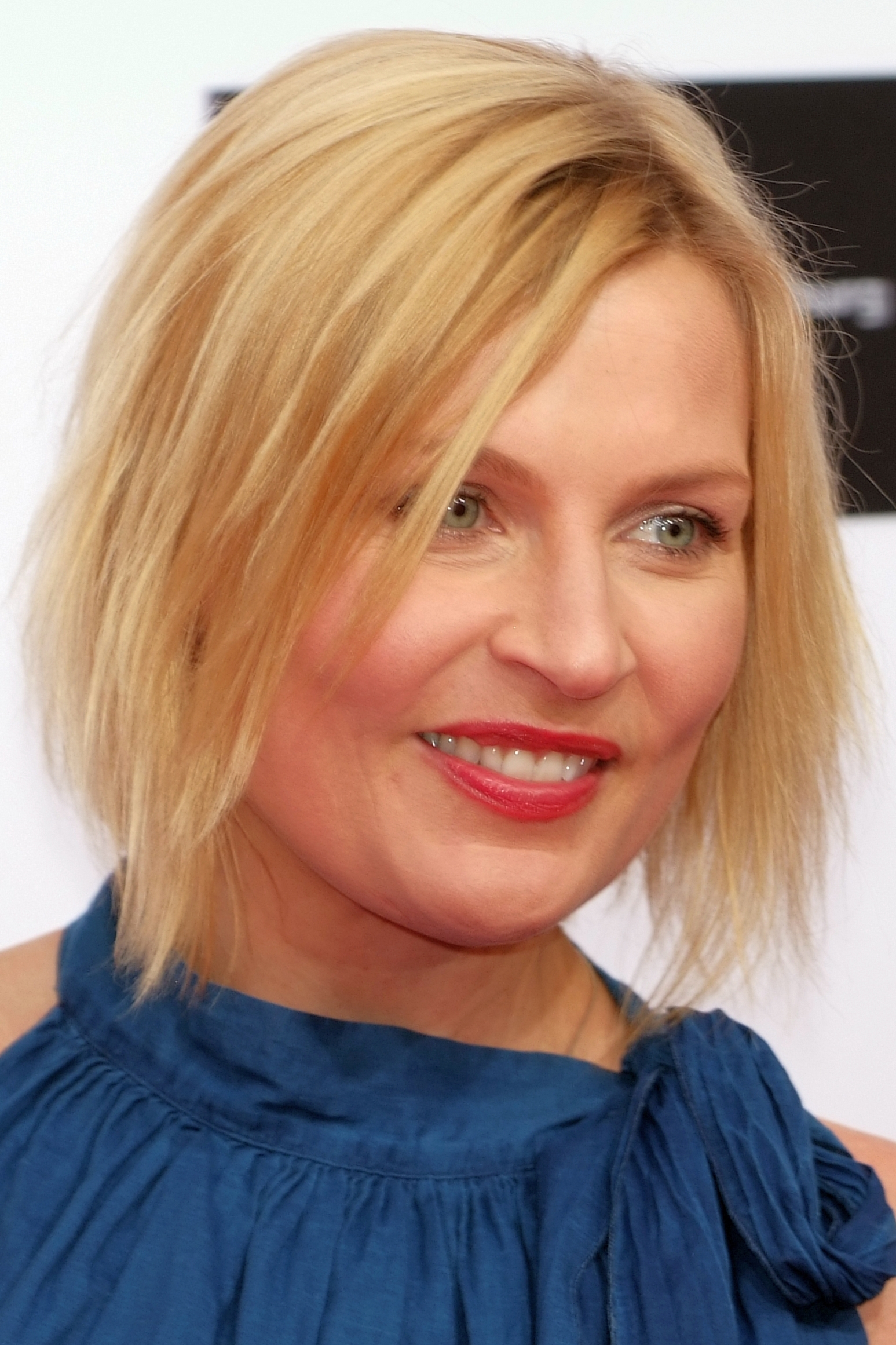
- Englund at the award show for the Studio Hamburg Nachwuchspreis in 2012
- Born: 18 April 1975 (age 51); Heidelberg
- Occupation: Actress
- Years active: 1997–present
- Known for: Notruf Hafenkante
- Website: www.englund.de

Sanna Englund (born 18 April 1975 in Heidelberg, Germany) is a German actress and model.

As of 2009 Englund was single.

== Filmography ==
- 1998: Angel Express
- 1999: Himmelskörper
- 2000: Leinen los
- 2000: Die Cleveren
- 2001–2003: Hinter Gittern – Der Frauenknast (episodes 153-245)
- 2001: Lätta (TV advertisement)
- 2001: Heute ist nicht gestern
- 2002: Hallo Robbie!
- 2002: Leipzig Homicide – Seitensprung
- 2003: Ruhige Lage, nette Aussicht
- 2003: Großstadtrevier
- 2002: Cologne's Finest 3
- 2003: Otto Versand (TV advertisement)
- 2003: Berlin, Berlin – Daily Talk
- 2003: Die Wache – Zahn um Zahn
- 2004–2005: St. Angela (episodes 236-275)
- 2005: Abschnitt 40 – Terroristen
- 2005: Balko – Totalschaden
- 2005: Verliebt in Berlin (episodes 6–10)
- 2005: Auftauchen
- 2005: Du Darfst (TV advertisement)
- 2005: Mörderspiel
- 2005: KomA
- 2005: Liebesleben – Freier Fall
- 2006: Alarm für Cobra 11 – Die Autobahnpolizei – Volles Risiko
- 2006: Die Sitte – Schichtwechsel
- 2006: Schmetterlinge im Bauch
- 2006: Blackout – Die Erinnerung ist tödlich – Unter Brüdern
- 2006–2008: Zwei Herzen und zwölf Pfoten
- Seit 2006: Notruf Hafenkante
- 2007: R. I. S. – Die Sprache der Toten – Vermisst
- 2007: GSG 9 – Ihr Einsatz ist ihr Leben – Ich, der Feind
- 2007: Der Kriminalist
- 2008: Die Anwälte – Entmündigung
- 2009: Der Dicke – Gefährliches Spiel
- 2011: Küstenwache – Ein tödliches Spiel
- 2011: Alarm für Cobra 11 – Die Autobahnpolizei – Mitten ins Herz
- 2013: Der Landarzt – Amtshilfe
- 2013: Kripo Holstein – Mord und Meer – Todesengel in Weiß (as Veronica Nater)
