= Dard Divorce =

2007 German horror film

- DVD cover
- Directed by: Olaf Ittenbach
- Written by: Olaf Ittenbach
- Produced by: Olaf Ittenbach; Michael Kraetzer; Mike Neun
- Starring: Martina Ittenbach; Daryl Jackson; Jaymes Butler; Barrett Jones; Kamary Phillips
- Cinematography: Burhan Özdal
- Edited by: Eckart Zerzawy
- Music by: Konstantinos Kalogeropoulos
- Production companies: IMAS Filmproductions; I-ON New Media
- Release date: 2007
- Running time: 87 minutes
- Country: Germany
- Language: English

Dard Divorce is a 2007 German horror film written and directed by Olaf Ittenbach. It stars Martina Ittenbach, Daryl Jackson, Jaymes Butler, Barrett Jones and Kamary Phillips. The film follows a woman whose bitter divorce and custody dispute develops into a series of abductions, murders and torture connected to stolen drugs and money.

== Plot ==
Nathalie Stein, a family-law attorney, is going through a bitter divorce from her husband Tim and hopes to obtain sole custody of their two children, Jeremy and Elisabeth. Tim picks up the children for a visit but fails to return them. Nathalie's dog also disappears, and she discovers a message written in blood bearing the word "Dard", which is explained in the film as the Persian word for "pain".

Nathalie contacts the police and arranges to meet Tim and the children, but they do not appear. Later that night, Tim suddenly arrives at her house severely injured. Before apparently dying, he tells Nathalie that the children have been abducted. When Detective James Gates arrives, however, Tim's body has disappeared and the scene has been cleaned, leaving no evidence to support Nathalie's account.

Police officer Phil Warren subsequently arrives and reveals himself to be corrupt. He overpowers Nathalie and tells her that Tim became involved with a Persian gangster named Moha and stole a large amount of cash and cocaine after a drug deal. Warren claims that Jeremy has been killed and threatens Elisabeth in an attempt to force Nathalie to reveal where Tim hid the money and drugs. He tortures Nathalie, but she eventually escapes and kills him.

A man named Daniel then arrives and says that he had been following Warren. He tends to Nathalie's injuries and gives her a different version of events, claiming that Tim became involved in the drug deal by chance. Daniel subsequently reveals that he also wants the missing money and drugs. He drugs and tortures Nathalie, but she manages to fight back and kill him.

Gates then contacts Nathalie and reveals that he too is corrupt. He uses Elisabeth as a hostage and orders Nathalie to locate the stolen property. Remembering the circumstances of her dog's disappearance, Nathalie realizes that a clue contained in one of Tim's old children's songs points to the hiding place. Gates shoots Elisabeth in the shoulder after Nathalie moves unexpectedly, but Nathalie manages to shoot Gates when he enters the house.

Nathalie goes to a nearby cornfield, where she discovers that Tim is still alive and has Jeremy with him. Tim reveals his own involvement in the drug transaction and the theft of the money and cocaine. He attempts to kill Nathalie, but Elisabeth shoots him from behind. Nathalie survives with her two children.

== Cast ==
- Martina Ittenbach as Nathalie Stein
- Daryl Jackson as Daniel
- Jaymes Butler as Police Officer Phil Warren
- Barrett Jones as Tim
- Kamary Phillips as Detective James Gates
- Gideon Jackson as Jeremy
- Henora Jackson as Elisabeth
- Kami Esfahani as Moha
- Christopher Kriesa as Lawyer Jake
- Torsten Mühlbach as Lover
- Olaf Ittenbach as Guy on Street

== Production ==
Dard Divorce was produced by Olaf Ittenbach, Michael Kraetzer and Mike Neun for IMAS Filmproductions and I-ON New Media. Burhan Özdal served as cinematographer, Eckart Zerzawy edited the film and Konstantinos Kalogeropoulos composed the score.

Part of the production took place in the United States. In November 2006, Dread Central reported that the American portion of the shoot had wrapped several weeks earlier and that the film had entered post-production.

The film was made in English. In an interview conducted during the production period, Martina Ittenbach described Dard Divorce as a psychological thriller involving a custody dispute, organized crime and extreme violence, and said that the production was expected to be completed during 2007.

== Release ==
Dard Divorce had its world premiere in the official feature-film selection of the 2007 San Sebastián Horror and Fantasy Film Festival in Spain. Contemporary coverage described the screening as the film's world premiere.

The festival catalogue listed the film at 90 minutes, while later uncut home-video and digital versions are generally listed at approximately 87 minutes.

Two censored DVD editions were released in Germany in March and April 2008. According to Schnittberichte, both the SPIO/JK-approved edition and the FSK-rated edition contained cuts, with one German release running approximately 73 minutes. A contemporary review of the 73-minute version noted that approximately fourteen minutes of material were absent and argued that the cuts substantially affected the continuity of the film.

The I-ON New Media DVD was added to Germany's index of media harmful to minors on 31 July 2008. The edition remained listed by the Federal Agency for Child and Youth Protection in the Media in its published 2025 index.

Massacre Video subsequently released the film uncut on Blu-ray in North America in 2024. The edition used a new 1080p master and included the making-of documentary and several early Ittenbach short films.

== Reception ==
Reviewing the film for Horror News, Sean Leonard criticized the sound mix and described some of the gore as unrealistic and campy, but praised the amount of gore and brutality and the portrayal of Nathalie as an active protagonist who fights back against her attackers.

The reviewer for OutNow, who evaluated the heavily shortened 73-minute German DVD version, was considerably more negative. The review argued that the removal of numerous violent scenes also removed information necessary to follow the story, leaving characters injured or dead without sufficient explanation. The reviewer therefore considered it impossible to fairly judge the complete film on the basis of that version.

Bryan Schuessler of Horror Society, reviewing an uncut version, responded more positively to the film's practical gore effects and recommended it to viewers of extreme horror, describing the elaborate violence as the principal attraction of the film.
