= Geliebte Schwestern =

- Country of origin: Germany

Production
- Production company: Columbia TriStar Film und Fernseh Produktions GmbH

Geliebte Schwestern is a German television series.

== See also ==
- List of German television series
