= Casting About =

- Directed by: Barry J. Hershey
- Produced by: Lewis Wheeler
- Cinematography: Allie Humenuk
- Edited by: Marc Grossman
- Production company: Moving Still Productions
- Distributed by: Kino International
- Release dates: 22 June 2005 (Sydney Film Festival); 11 May 2007 (United States)
- Running time: 86 minutes
- Language: English

Casting About is a 2005 American film about casting for a feature film. Arising from the efforts to fill the female leads of a yet-to-be-made theatrical film titled Moving Still, this behind-the-scenes documentary tracks the deliberations and creative process of casting. It includes footage taken from the auditions of 350 actresses in Berlin, Boston, Chicago, London and Los Angeles that depict the attempts of a director to find performers for three characters and the struggle of the actors to win roles in his film. The film is directed by Barry Hershey and produced by Lewis Wheeler.

== Synopsis ==
350 professional actresses responding to calls from casting directors in five cities present themselves for three major roles in a dramatic film to be set in the late 1940s. They converse with the film’s writer/director about their background, training, professional experience and skills. They then perform prepared pieces from established works, followed by their presentation of the character in readings from the script of the project, all the while guided and evaluated by the director. Before the project was placed on hold, the casting footage was intended to be integrated into the theatrical film itself as a reflection of its themes of fiction overlapping reality, voyeurism and intimacy.

== Reception ==
Matt Zoller Seitz of The New York Times wrote: Casting About is "A solid documentary about how art is made...". Kenneth Turan of the Los Angeles Times called it "A fascinating and surprisingly involving film... remarkable... made with awe and admiration, a tribute to people whose life work is as much a calling as a career." Gerald Peary of The Boston Phoenix wrote "...this lovely, almost embarrassingly intimate documentary... What raw, exposed moments! The tryouts reveal so much!" Richard Kuipers of Variety considered that: "The acting process is joyously celebrated in Casting About, a captivating documentary... that pays uplifting tribute to acting traditions and female spirit in equal measure." Ty Burr of The Boston Globe wrote: "Still, the film's a striking piece of work that, in the end, is just an inspired stunt." Frank Scheck of The Hollywood Reporter described the film as "A simultaneously dispiriting and inspiring portrait of the auditioning process…"
