= Filmspiegel =

Biweekly film magazine in Germany (1947–1991)

- Categories: Film magazine
- Frequency: Biweekly
- Founded: 1947
- Final issue: 1991
- Country: East Germany; Germany
- Based in: Berlin
- Language: German
- ISSN: 0015-1734
- OCLC: 879706175

Filmspiegel (German: Film Mirror) was a biweekly magazine which featured articles about cinema and related fields, including teaching approaches towards drama. It was started in East Germany in 1947, and following the reunification it continued to be published until 1991.

== History and profile ==
The magazine was launched in 1947 with the title Neue Film Welt (German: New Film World). It was restarted by a decree of the ruling party of East Germany, Socialist Unity Party, with the title Filmspiegel in 1954. Its headquarters was in Berlin. The magazine was published in black and white until the 1970s when it began to use colour printing.

Filmspiegel covered a wide range of topics, including drama schools and teaching approaches. It played a significant role in the development of the stardom concept in the East German cinema. Due to the restrictions on the paper quota the magazine published limited number of copies, but had a high level of readership. Filmspiegel folded in 1991.
