= Tina Krause =

American actress

- Born: Cristina Krause; July 29, 1970 (age 55); Queens, New York, USA
- Occupations: Film actress Film director Film producer
- Years active: 1994–present

Tina Krause (born July 29, 1970) is an American film actress, producer, director, and model.

== Career ==
Referred to as a 'B Movie Queen', and an 'Indie Horror Queen', the bulk of her film work has been with shoestring-budget independent producers of horror films and erotic spoofs. In an interview at Horror Society, she states that she was "discovered" at Chiller Theatre (by Aven Warren and Gary Saul of Wave Productions), and has been acting "ever since". Her first feature was Sorority Slaughter in 1994. By the time she was in her 30s, she had become a "huge fan favorite".

Krause has appeared in over 78 independent, direct-to-video features, including Penny Dreadful, The Drunken Dead Guy, The Thirsting, Zombiegeddon, and Play Dead. She also worked several times with RedLetterMedia, including on The Recovered, Feeding Frenzy, and The Grabowskis. Tina Krause has also done some fetish modeling, sometimes under the stage name Mia Copia. She is in Horrotica which began its principal filming in the New York–New Jersey area in June 2009. In 2011 she portrayed Sally in Richard Chandler's Christmas comedy film Scrooge in the Hood, which is a parody of Charles Dickens' A Christmas Carol. In 2015, Tina starred alongside fellow scream queens Erika Smith and Rachael Robbins in The Fappening.

Tina Krause is also known as a film director, with her most significant work being Limbo, a 1999 feature horror film inspired by her own nightmares and hallucinations accidentally caused by a drugged chocolate and partly meant to be a statement against overuse of sexploitation in horror films and prejudice against women as directors.

Besides acting and directing, Tina Krause also works as a production designer, cinematographer, and bartender.

== Partial filmography ==
- Sorority Slaughter (1994)
- Rana, Queen of the Amazon (1994)
- Rana and the Vengeance of Ilsa von Todd (1994)
- Female Mercenaries on Zombie Island (1995)
- Sorority Slaughter 2 (1996)
- Danger in Blue (1996)
- Curse of the Swamp Creature 2 (1997)
- Bloodletting (1997)
- The Hypnotic Murders (1998)
- Psycho Sisters (1998)
- Dead Students Society (1998)
- The Vampire's Seduction (1998)
- Evil Streets (1998)
- Scary Sexy Disaster Movie (1999)
- Eaten Alive: A Tasteful Revenge (1999)
- Crimson Nights (1999)
- Cannibal Doctor (1999)
- Limbo (1999)
- Misty's Secret (2000)
- Dinner for Two (2000)
- Danger in Blue 2 (2000)
- Crimson Nights: Vampire's Seduction 2 (2000)
- International Necktie Strangler (2000) (as Mia Copia)
- Strawberry Estates (2001)
- Shoot the Girls (2001) (as Mia Copia)
- Blood For the Muse (2001)
- Hayride Slaughter (2001)
- Witchouse 3: Demon Fire (2001)
- The Vegas Showgirl Strangler (2002)
- Revenge of the Necktie Strangler (2002)
- An Erotic Vampire in Paris (2002) (as Mia Copia)
- Machines of Love and Hate (2003)
- Vampire Vixens (2003) (as Mia Copia)
- Zombiegeddon (2003)
- Silver Mummy (2004)
- And Then They Were Dead (2004)
- Bikini Girls on Dinosaur Planet (2005) (as Mia Copia)
- Penny Dreadful (2005)
- Thirsting (2006)
- Cross the Line (2007)
- Blood Oath (2007)
- Catching the Fever (2008)
- Survive! (2009)
- Cross the Line (2010)
- Feeding Frenzy (2010)
- She Wolf Rising (2010)
- Scrooge in the Hood (2011)
- When Death Calls (2012)
- The O.C. Club (2012)
- The Fappening (2015)
- Hollywood Warrioress: War of the Gods (2019)

== Recognition ==
In their review of the film Thirsting (aka Lilith), Sci-Fi Universe wrote, "Most actresses are unknown. Only Tina Krause has earned a solid reputation, particularly through her performances in films produced by rogues fantastic Seduction Cinema".
