= Olaf Ittenbach =

German film director

Olaf Ittenbach (born 27 February 1969) is a German film director, actor and special effects artist known for his work in German underground horror films.

== Filmography ==
- Black Past (1989)
- The Burning Moon (1992)
- Premutos: The Fallen Angel (1997)
- Riverplay (2000)
- Legion of the Dead (2001)
- Beyond the Limits (2003)
- Garden of Love (2003)
- Chain Reaction (2006)
- Familienradgeber (2006)
- Dard Divorce (2007)
- Familienradgeber 2 (2009)
- No Reason (2010)
- Legend of Hell (2012)
- Savage Love (2012)
- 5 Seasons (2015)
- Levizia (2024)
