= Violent Shit =

- VHS released by Burning Moon Home Video
- Directed by: Andreas Schnaas
- Written by: Andreas Schnaas
- Produced by: The Violent Shitters
- Starring: Karl Inger; Gabi Bäzner; Wolfgang Hinz; Volker Mechter; Christian Biallas
- Cinematography: Steve Aquilina
- Edited by: Steve Aquilina
- Music by: Micky Engels
- Production company: Reel Gore Productions
- Distributed by: Blood Pictures
- Release date: 1989 (West Germany)
- Running time: 73 minutes
- Country: West Germany
- Language: German

Violent Shit is a 1989 West German shot-on-video horror film written and directed by Andreas Schnaas. Shot on the low-fi Video-8 format, it was the first film in a series centered on the killer Karl the Butcher.

== Plot ==
A young boy named Karl Berger Sr. (a surname given in the sequel) murders his abusive mother with a meat cleaver after she beats him for returning home late. Twenty years later, in the mid-1970s, the imprisoned Karl is being transported to an unspecified location by the police, but manages to kill the officers and escape into the wilderness, somehow acquiring a cleaver in the process. Over the course of several days, Karl commits a series of murders across the countryside, mutilating and occasionally cannibalizing his victims. After one double homicide, Karl faints and flashes back to the day he murdered his mother, revealing he had been coerced into killing her by a demon (which a line of dialogue indicates might be his father) he had encountered in the cellar after being locked in it.

At one point, Karl also encounters an apparition of Jesus crucified in the forest, which he hacks open, and crawls inside. After this encounter, Karl commits an additional dual murder outside a church then collapses in a field. His skin (which had been inexplicably decaying throughout the film) rots off, and he dies by ripping himself open, revealing a baby covered in blood.

== Cast ==
- Karl Inger as Karl Berger Sr. (as K. The Butcher Shitter)
- Gabi Bäzner
- Wolfgang Hinz as Wolfgang
- Volker Mechter
- Christian Biallas
- Uwe Boldt
- Marco Hegele
- Lars Warncke
- Werner Knifke
- Andreas Schnaas as Landscaper #2
- Steve Aquilina
- Bettina X.
- Maren Y.
- Beate Z.

== Production ==
Schnaas made Violent Shit with a group of friends over a series of weekends in 1989. The film was shot on the low-fi Video-8 format using standard-definition video equipment.

== Release ==
Violent Shit was released directly to home video. Mondo Digital has described it as Germany's first straight-to-video horror film and credits the success of the film with leading to a sequel several years later.

=== Home media ===
The first three films in the series were released together in Germany by Astro Records and were later issued in a 20th-anniversary edition by Independ'Or.

On April 11, 2017, Synapse Films released The Violent Shit Collection, a three-disc, all-region DVD set in North America. The collection contains the first three films, Violent Shit 4.0: Karl the Butcher vs. Axe, and Schnaas's Zombie '90: Extreme Pestilence as a bonus feature. The first three Violent Shit films were remastered by their original owners for the release.

== Reception ==
Later reviews focused on the film's rudimentary production values and emphasis on graphic gore. HorrorNews.net criticized the film's thin plot, sound and camerawork, while praising its gore sequences and what the reviewer considered its creativity given the limited production resources.

Nathaniel Thompson of Mondo Digital described the film as a "nearly plotless VHS wonder" and criticized its technical execution, while noting its extensive practical gore effects.

Brett Gallman of Oh, the Horror! similarly noted the amateur nature of the production but praised its graphic violence and Schnaas's willingness to push the film's gore effects to extremes.

== Sequels and reboot ==
Schnaas followed the film with Violent Shit II: Mother Hold My Hand in 1992 and Violent Shit III: Infantry of Doom in 1999. He later co-directed Violent Shit 4.0: Karl the Butcher vs. Axe with Timo Rose, released in 2010.

A separate reboot, Violent Shit: The Movie, directed by Luigi Pastore, was released in 2015. Schnaas appears in the film as the Hamburg informant Paul Glas and is credited alongside Steve Aquilina for the film's underlying story.
