= Women Make Film =

Documentary film by Mark Cousins

- Directed by: Mark Cousins
- Written by: Mark Cousins
- Narrated by: Adjoa Andoh, Jane Fonda, Kerry Fox, Thandiwe Newton, Tilda Swinton, Sharmila Tagore, Debra Winger
- Distributed by: BFI Player
- Release date: 1 September 2018 (Venice Film Festival)
- Running time: 14 hours (divided into 40 chapters)
- Countries: United Kingdom, Ireland
- Language: English

Women Make Film is a documentary film by the British-Irish filmmaker and film critic Mark Cousins. The film premiered on 1 September 2018 at the Venice Film Festival, and was released on the BFI Player in May 2020.

The film is divided into 40 chapters over 14 hours and features the work of 183 directors.

== Background ==
In the 1990s, Cousins curated a season of documentary films and realised later he had only included a single film made by a woman. This got him interested in finding and highlighting women filmmakers from around the world and throughout film history, eventually leading to the creation of this documentary. The premise of the film is that it is not about women filmmakers or institutional sexism; rather it is a documentary about film itself, and it explores 40 different aspects of filmmaking, drawing from a wide range of films as examples, all of which are made by women.

The academic Laura Mulvey curated the inaugural Women's Film Event at the Edinburgh film festival in 1972, the blurb for their event stated that "A festival of men's films would be simply absurd. It's because so few women have been able to make films that this festival exists". Mulvey said of Women Make Film that "The amazing extent of the work, with over a thousand clips, has the potential to bring women directors out of gender categorisation and into film history as such. But it also offers an unprecedented opportunity to enjoy women's cinematic vision and reflect on the way women have seen and indeed made the world through film – a source of wonder and of speculation!"

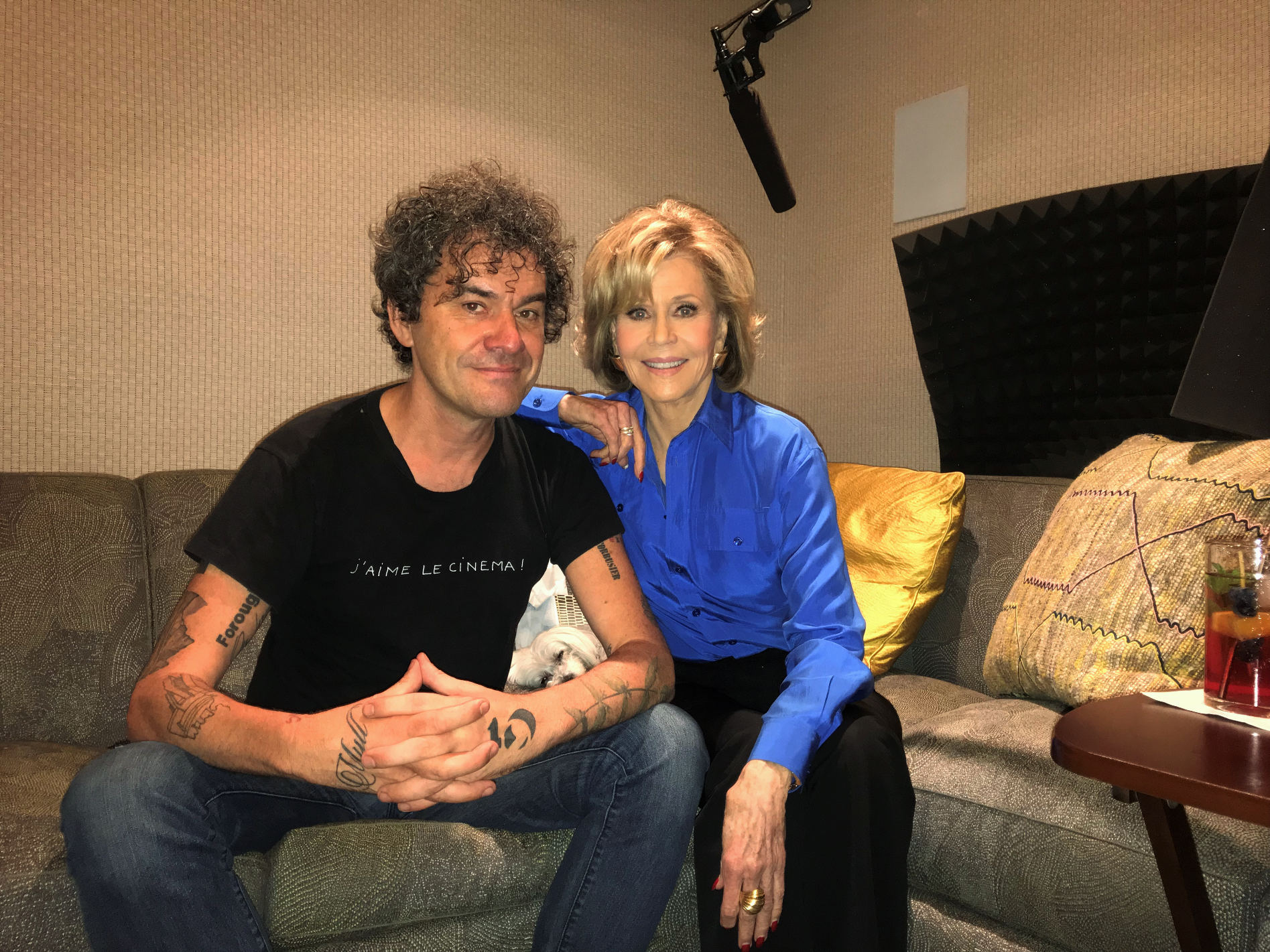
Mark Cousins with Jane Fonda at the recording of her voice over for Women Make Film, 2018

The documentary is narrated by Adjoa Andoh, Jane Fonda, Kerry Fox, Thandiwe Newton, Tilda Swinton, Sharmila Tagore and Debra Winger.

The Birds' Eye View charity hosted weekly viewing parties and Facebook Live responses and debates on the documentary from women filmmakers for audiences at home during the COVID-19 pandemic lockdowns of 2020.

== List of chapters ==
All films are feature films unless otherwise noted.

=== Introductions ===
- A byahme mladi (We Were Young) (Bu, 1961) – Binka Zhelyazkova
- Ty i ya (You and Me) (SU, 1971) – Larisa Shepitko
- On the 12th Day... (GB, 1955, short) – Wendy Toye
- Korotkiye vstrechi (Brief Encounters) (SU, 1967) – Kira Muratova

=== Openings ===
- Dōngfāng Hóng (The East Is Red) (Ch, 1965) – Wang Ping
- First Comes Courage (US, 1943) – Dorothy Arzner
- Samt al-qusūr (The Silences of the Palace) (Tu, 1994) – Moufida Tlatli
- Strange Days (US, 1995) – Kathryn Bigelow
- Harlan County U.S.A. (US, 1976, documentary) – Barbara Kopple
- Innocence (Innocence) (F, 2004) – Lucile Hadžihalilović
- L'Avenir (Things to Come) (F, 2016) – Mia Hansen-Løve
- Je, tu, il, elle ("I, You, He, She", F/B, 1974) – Chantal Akerman
- All for Mary (GB, 1955) – Wendy Toye
- Sweetie (Au, 1989) – Jane Campion
- Däumlienchen (Thumbelina) (GB, 1954, animation short) – Lotte Reiniger
- Le Bonheur ("Happiness", F, 1965) – Agnès Varda
- Faunovo velmi pozdní odpoledne (The Very Late Afternoon of a Faun) (Cz, 1983) – Věra Chytilová
- The Black Dog (GB, 1989, animation) – Alison de Vere
- Melancholian 3 huonetta (The 3 Rooms of Melancholia) (Fi, 2004) – Pirjo Honkasalo
- Roozi ke zan shodam (The Day I Became a Woman) (Ir, 2000) – Marziyeh Meshkini
- Textê Reş (Blackboards) (Ir, 2000) – Samira Makhmalbaf
- Attenberg (Gr, 2010) – Athina Rachel Tsangari
- Mein Stern (Be My Star) (De, 2001) – Valeska Grisebach
- Die Besucherin (In Between Days) [de] (De, 2008) – Lola Randl
- Pora umierac (Time to Die) (Pl, 2007) – Dorota Kędzierzawska
- Butter on the Latch (US, 2013) – Josephine Decker
- Ostatni etap (The Last Stage) (Pl, 1948) – Wanda Jakubowska
- La ciénaga (The Swamp) (Ar, 2001) – Lucrecia Martel

=== Tone ===
- Merrily We Go to Hell (US, 1932) – Dorothy Arzner
- Wanda (US, 1970) – Barbara Loden
- Pet Sematary (US, 1989) – Mary Lambert
- Tank Girl (US, 1995) – Rachel Talalay
- On the 12th Day... (GB, 1955, short) – Wendy Toye
- By the Sea (US, 2015) – Angelina Jolie
- Peel (Au, 1982, short) – Jane Campion
- Beau Travail (F, 1999) – Claire Denis
- Olivia (The Pit of Loneliness) (F, 1951) – Jacqueline Audry
- Mädchen in Uniform (Girls in Uniform) (De, 1931) – Leontine Sagan
- Dva v odnom (Two in One) (Ua, 2007) – Kira Muratova
- American Psycho (US, 2000) – Mary Harron
- A New Leaf (US, 1971) – Elaine May
- Betoniyö (Concrete Night) (Fi, 2013) – Pirjo Honkasalo

=== Believability ===
- Warum ist Frau B. glücklich? (Why Is Mrs B. Happy?) (De, 1968, documentary) – Erika Runge
- The Hurt Locker (US, 2008) – Kathryn Bigelow
- El camino (The Path) (Es, 1963) – Ana Mariscal
- Lore (Au/De, 2012) – Cate Shortland
- Chto by ty vybral? (Which Would You Choose?) (SU, 1981) – Dinara Asanova
- Meek's Cutoff (US, 2010) – Kelly Reichardt
- Hedi Schneider steckt fest (Hedi Schneider Is Stuck) (De, 2015) – Sonja Heiss
- Chto by ty vybral? (Which Would You Choose?) (SU, 1981) – Dinara Asanova
- Toni Erdmann (De, 2016) – Maren Ade
- Point Break (US, 1991) – Kathryn Bigelow
- The Blot (Us, 1921, silent) – Lois Weber
- Frozen River (US, 2008) – Courtney Hunt
- Selma (US, 2014) – Ava DuVernay
- Not a Pretty Picture (US, 1976, docudrama) – Martha Coolidge
- Sib (The Apple) (Ir, 1998) – Samira Makhmalbaf

=== Introducing a Character ===
- Tsuki wa noborinu (The Moon Has Risen) (Jp, 1955) – Kinuyo Tanaka
- Deutschland, bleiche Mutter (Germany, Pale Mother) (De, 1980) – Helma Sanders-Brahms
- Somewhere (US, 2010) – Sofia Coppola
- Nana (F, 2011) – Valérie Massadian [fr]
- The Connection (US, 1961, found footage) – Shirley Clarke
- The Watermelon Woman (US, 1996) – Cheryl Dunye
- Wayne's World (US, 1992) – Penelope Spheeris
- Fish Tank (GB, 2009) – Andrea Arnold
- Bande de filles (Girlhood) (F, 2014) – Céline Sciamma
- Toni Erdmann (De, 2016) – Maren Ade
- Povest plamennykh let (Chronicle of Flaming Years) (SU, 1961) – Yuliya Solntseva

=== Meet Cute ===
- Kranes konditori (Krane's Confectionery) (Dk, 1951) – Astrid Henning-Jensen
- Korotkiye vstrechi (Brief Encounters) (SU, 1967) – Kira Muratova
- La Coquille et le Clergyman (The Seashell and the Clergyman) (F, 1928) – Germaine Dulac
- The Heartbreak Kid (US, 1972) – Elaine May
- Grand Central (F, 2013) – Rebecca Zlotowski
- One. Two. One (Ir, 2011) – Mania Akbari
- Der Besucher (In Between Days) [de] (De, 2008) – Lola Randl
- A Girl Walks Home Alone at Night (US, 2014) – Ana Lily Amirpour
- Yakshagaanam (The Song of Yakshi) (In, 1961) – Sheela
- Wanda (US, 1970) – Barbara Loden
- Sans toit ni loi (Vagabond) (F, 1985) – Agnès Varda
- Fleeting Loves (Ro, 1974) – Malvina Ursianu
- Tue-moi (Töte mich/Kill Me) [de] (De, 2012) – Emily Atef
- Trolösa (Faithless) (Se, 2000) – Liv Ullmann

=== Conversation ===
- Plätze in Städten (Places in Cities) (De, 1998) – Angela Schanelec
- Middle of Nowhere (US, 2012) – Ava DuVernay
- Bande de filles (Girlhood) (F, 2014) – Céline Sciamma
- L'une chante, l'autre pas (One Sings, the Other Doesn't) (F, 1977) – Agnès Varda
- Älskande par (Loving Couples) (Se, 1964) – Mai Zetterling
- Dǒng Fūrén (The Arch) (HK, 1968) – Cecile Tang
- A Girl Walks Home Alone at Night (US, 2014) – Ana Lily Amirpour
- The Virgin Suicides (US, 1999) – Sofia Coppola
- By the Sea (US, 2015) – Angelina Jolie
- Together (1956) – Lorenza Mazzetti
- Sparsh (Touch) (In, 1980) – Sai Paranjpye
- Come Early Morning (US, 2006) – Joey Lauren Adams
- Deutschland, bleiche Mutter (Germany, Pale Mother) (De, 1980) – Helma Sanders-Brahms
- Privarzaniyat balon (The Tied Up Balloon) (Bu, 1962) – Binka Zhelyazkova
- The Arbor (GB, 2010) – Clio Barnard
- Harlan County U.S.A. (US, 1976, documentary) – Barbara Kopple
- Melancholian 3 huonetta (The 3 Rooms of Melancholia) (Fi, 2004) – Pirjo Honkasalo
- Tomboy (F, 2011) – Céline Sciamma

=== Framing ===
- L'une chante, l'autre pas (One Sings, the Other Doesn't) (F, 1977) – Agnès Varda
- Lourdes (At/F, 2009) – Jessica Hausner
- La niña santa (The Holy Girl) (Ar, 2004) – Lucrecia Martel
- Wanda (US, 1970) – Barbara Loden
- O něčem jiném (Something Different) (Cz, 1963) – Věra Chytilová
- Napló gyermekeimnek (Diary for My Children) (Hu, 1984) – Márta Mészáros
- The Hitch-Hiker (US, 1953) – Ida Lupino
- Dǒng Fūrén (The Arch) (HK, 1968) – Cecile Tang
- The Cave of the Yellow Dog (Mn, 2005) – Byambasuren Davaa
- Blue Steel (US, 1990) – Kathryn Bigelow
- Ostatni etap (The Last Stage) (Pl, 1948) – Wanda Jakubowska
- Vor der Morgenröte – Stefan Zweig in Amerika (Stefan Zweig: Farewell to Europe) (At/De, 2016) – Maria Schrader
- Hard, Fast and Beautiful (US, 1951) – Ida Lupino
- A New Leaf (US, 1971) – Elaine May
- O něčem jiném (Something Different) (Cz, 1963) – Věra Chytilová
- Ellen (GB, 2016) – Mahalia Belo
- Outrage (US, 1950) – Ida Lupino
- Olympia 2. Teil — Fest der Schönheit (Festival of Beauty) (De, 1938) – Leni Riefenstahl
- Olympia 1. Teil — Fest der Völker (Festival of Nations) (De, 1938) – Leni Riefenstahl
- Le Bonheur ("Happiness", F, 1965) – Agnès Varda
- Marseille (De, 2004) – Angela Schanelec
- Surname Viet Given Name Nam (Vn, 1989, documentary) – Trinh T. Minh-ha
- La Pointe Courte (F, 1954) – Agnès Varda

=== Tracking ===
- Face (GB, 1997) – Antonia Bird
- La Pointe Courte (F, 1954) – Agnès Varda
- Outrage (US, 1950) – Ida Lupino
- Home (Sw, 2008) – Ursula Meier
- Wayne's World (US, 1992) – Penelope Spheeris
- Annas Sommer (Anna's Summer) (De/Gr/Es, 2001) – Jeanine Meerapfel
- Le Lit ("the bed", B/Ch, 1982) – Marion Hänsel
- D'Est (From the East) (B/F, 1993, documentary) – Chantal Akerman

=== Staging ===
- Tsuki wa noborinu (The Moon Has Risen) (Jp, 1955) – Kinuyo Tanaka
- Toni Erdmann (De, 2016) – Maren Ade
- Dva v odnom (Two in One) (Ua, 2007) – Kira Muratova
- Bande de filles (Girlhood) (F, 2014) – Céline Sciamma
- Unrelated (GB, 2007) – Joanna Hogg
- Yo, la peor de todas (I, the Worst of All) (Ar, 1990) – María Luisa Bemberg
- Zacharovana Desna (The Enchanted Desna) (SU, 1964) – Yuliya Solntseva
- Visages Villages (Faces Places) (F, 2017, documentary) – Agnès Varda and JR
- Flickorna (The Girls) (Se, 1968) – Mai Zetterling
- Vor der Morgenröte – Stefan Zweig in Amerika (Stefan Zweig: Farewell to Europe) (At/De, 2016) – Maria Schrader

=== Journey ===
- Zacharovana Desna (The Enchanted Desna) (SU, 1964) – Yuliya Solntseva
- Däumlienchen (Thumbelina) (GB, 1954, animation short) – Lotte Reiniger
- Nana (F, 2011) – Valérie Massadian [fr]
- Astenicheskiy sindrom (The Asthenic Syndrome) (SU, 1989) – Kira Muratova
- Khake Sar Beh Mohr (The Sealed Soil) (Ir, 1977) – Marva Nabili
- Mikey and Nicky (US, 1976) – Elaine May
- Kranes konditori (Krane's Confectionery) (Dk, 1951) – Astrid Henning-Jensen
- La Course à la saucisse [fr] ("The Race for the Sausage", F, 1907, silent short) – Alice Guy-Blaché
- Koibumi (Love Letter) (Jp, 1953) – Kinuyo Tanaka
- Point Break (US, 1991) – Kathryn Bigelow
- Something New (US, 2006) – Nell Shipman
- American Honey (GB/US, 2015) – Andrea Arnold
- The Loveless (US, 1981) – Kathryn Bigelow, Monty Montgomery
- Lluvia (Rain) (Ar, 2008) – Paula Hernández
- The Babadook (Au, 2014) – Jennifer Kent
- 35 Rhums (35 Shots of Rum) (F, 2008) – Claire Denis
- Certain Women (US, 2016) – Kelly Reichardt
- The Cave of the Yellow Dog (Mn, 2005) – Byambasuren Davaa

=== Discovery ===
- Namueomneun san (Treeless Mountain) (SKo, 2008) – So Yong Kim
- Évolution (Evolution) (F, 2015) – Lucile Hadžihalilović
- Big (US, 1988) – Penny Marshall
- Avenue de l'Opéra (F, 1900, silent short documentary) – Alice Guy-Blaché
- Napló gyermekeimnek (Diary for My Children) (Hu, 1984) – Márta Mészáros
- Tomboy (F, 2011) – Céline Sciamma
- La Coquille et le Clergyman (The Seashell and the Clergyman) (F, 1928) – Germaine Dulac
- Chibusa yo eien nare (The Eternal Breasts) (Jp, 1955) – Kinuyo Tanaka
- Wonder Woman (US, 2017) – Patty Jenkins
- The Hurt Locker (US, 2008) – Kathryn Bigelow
- Khamosh Pani (Silent Waters) (In/Pk, 2003) – Sabiha Sumar
- Långt borta och nära (Near and Far Away) (Se, 1976) – Marianne Ahrne
- Mr Pascal (GB, 1979, animation) – Alison de Vere
- Dreams of a Life (GB/Ie, 2011) – Carol Morley

=== Adult-Child ===
- The Story of the Weeping Camel (Mn, 2003) – Byambasuren Davaa and Luigi Falomi
- Home (Ch, 2008) – Ursula Meier
- The Hurt Locker (US, 2008) – Kathryn Bigelow
- Une vraie jeune fille (A Real Young Girl) (F, 1976) – Catherine Breillat
- L'Enfant d'en haut (Sister) (Ch, 2012) – Ursula Meier
- Deutschland, bleiche Mutter (Germany, Pale Mother) (De, 1980) – Helma Sanders-Brahms
- Nattlek (Night Games) (Se, 1966) – Mai Zetterling
- Melodiya dlya sharmanki (Melody for a Street Organ) (Ua, 2009) – Kira Muratova
- Winter's Bone (US, 2010) – Debra Granik
- The Owl Who Married a Goose (Ca, 1974) – Caroline Leaf
- Lore (Au/De, 2012) – Cate Shortland
- Frozen River (US, 2008) – Courtney Hunt
- Mossane (Sn, 1996) – Safi Faye
- XXY (Ar, 2007) – Lucía Puenzo
- We Need to Talk About Kevin (GB/US, 2011) – Lynne Ramsay
- Sherrybaby (US, 2006) – Laurie Collyer
- Kur po Xhirohej një film (When Shooting a Film) (Al, 1981) – Xhanfize Keko
- A Portrait of Ga (GB, 1955, short) – Margaret Tait

=== Economy ===
- Évolution (Evolution) (F, 2015) – Lucile Hadžihalilović
- Innocence (Innocence) (F, 2004) – Lucile Hadžihalilović
- Yo, la peor de todas (I, the Worst of All) (Ar, 1990) – María Luisa Bemberg
- Beau Travail (F, 1999) – Claire Denis
- Chibusa yo eien nare (The Eternal Breasts) (Jp, 1955) – Kinuyo Tanaka
- L'une chante, l'autre pas (One Sings, the Other Doesn't) (F, 1977) – Agnès Varda
- Mein Stern (Be My Star) (De, 2001) – Valeska Grisebach
- Sans toit ni loi (Vagabond) (F, 1985) – Agnès Varda
- Appropriate Behavior (GB, 2014) – Desiree Akhavan

=== Editing ===
- Middle of Nowhere (2012) – Ava DuVernay
- Sambizanga (Ao/F, 1972) – Sarah Maldoror
- Olympia 2. Teil — Fest der Schönheit (Festival of Beauty) (1938) – Leni Riefenstahl
- The Hurt Locker (US, 2008) – Kathryn Bigelow
- Le Lit ("the bed", B/Ch, 1982) – Marion Hänsel
- Zabitá neděle (Squandered Sunday) (Cz, 1969) – Drahomíra Vihanová
- Flickorna (The Girls) (Se, 1968) – Mai Zetterling
- Deutschland, bleiche Mutter (Germany, Pale Mother) (De, 1980) – Helma Sanders-Brahms
- Les Filles du Roy (Ca, 1975) – Anne Claire Poirier
- Marseille (De, 2004) – Angela Schanelec
- The Loveless (US, 1981) – Kathryn Bigelow, Monty Montgomery
- Annas Sommer (Anna's Summer) (De/Gr/Es, 2001) – Jeanine Meerapfel
- Go! Go! Go! (US, 1964, experimental short) – Marie Menken
- Dǒng Fūrén (The Arch) (HK, 1968) – Cecile Tang

=== Point of View ===
- Proof (Au, 1991) – Jocelyn Moorhouse
- The Hitch-Hiker (US, 1953) – Ida Lupino
- Ung Flukt (The Wayward Girl) (No, 1959) – Edith Carlmar
- The Beguiled (US, 2017) – Sofia Coppola
- I cannibali (The Year of the Cannibals) (It, 1969) – Liliana Cavani
- Meek's Cutoff (US, 2010) – Kelly Reichardt
- Älskande par (Loving Couples) (Se, 1964) – Mai Zetterling
- Voskhozhdeniye (The Ascent) (SU, 1977) – Larisa Shepitko
- Kryl'ya (Wings) (SU, 1966) – Larisa Shepitko
- Strange Days (US, 1995) – Kathryn Bigelow
- The Babadook (Au, 2014) – Jennifer Kent
- À ma sœur! (Fat Girl) (F, 2001) – Catherine Breillat

=== Close Ups ===
- Une vraie jeune fille (A Real Young Girl) (F, 1976) – Catherine Breillat
- Örökbefogadás (Adoption) (Hu, 1975) – Márta Mészáros
- The Cheaters (Au, 1930, silent) – Paulette McDonagh
- Melancholian 3 huonetta (The 3 Rooms of Melancholia) (Fi, 2004) – Pirjo Honkasalo
- Xiu Xiu: The Sent Down Girl (Ch, 1998) – Joan Chen
- Madame a des envies (Madame's Cravings) (F, 1907, silent short) – Alice Guy-Blaché
- Évolution (Evolution) (F, 2015) – Lucile Hadžihalilović
- Le Lit ("the bed", B/Ch, 1982) – Marion Hänsel
- Étude cinégraphique sur une arabesque (F, 1929, experimental short) – Germaine Dulac
- Voskhozhdeniye (The Ascent) (SU, 1977) – Larisa Shepitko

=== Surrealism and Dreams ===
- Wayne's World (US, 1992) – Penelope Spheeris
- Three Cases of Murder: "In the Picture" (GB, 1954) – Wendy Toye
- 36 Chowringhee Lane (In, 1981) – Aparna Sen
- At Land (US, 1944, experimental silent short) – Maya Deren
- Meshes of the Afternoon (US, 1943, experimental silent short) – Maya Deren
- The Portrait of a Lady (GB/US, 1996) – Jane Campion
- The Gold Diggers (GB, 1983) – Sally Potter
- Dǒng Fūrén (The Arch) (HK, 1968) – Cecile Tang
- La Pointe Courte (F, 1954) – Agnès Varda
- Deutschland, bleiche Mutter (Germany, Pale Mother) (De, 1980) – Helma Sanders-Brahms
- Privarzaniyat balon (The Tied Up Balloon) (Bu, 1962) – Binka Zhelyazkova
- Sedmikrásky (Daisies) (Cz, 1966) – Věra Chytilová
- Napló gyermekeimnek (Diary for My Children) (Hu, 1984) – Márta Mészáros
- Évolution (Evolution) (F, 2015) – Lucile Hadžihalilović
- L'Invitation au voyage (Invitation to a Journey) (F, 1927, silent) – Germaine Dulac
- The Black Dog (GB, 1989, animation) – Alison de Vere

=== Bodies ===
- L'une chante, l'autre pas (One Sings, the Other Doesn't) (F, 1977) – Agnès Varda
- "Chocolate", segment of the anthology film 15Malaysia (My, 2009, omnibus of shorts) – Yasmin Ahmad
- Tomboy (F, 2011) – Céline Sciamma
- Fish Tank (GB, 2009) – Andrea Arnold
- Khake Sar Beh Mohr (The Sealed Soil) (Ir, 1977) – Marva Nabili
- Betoniyö (Concrete Night) (Fi, 2013) – Pirjo Honkasalo
- Beau Travail ("good work", F, 1999) – Claire Denis
- Olympia 2. Teil — Fest der Schönheit (Festival of Beauty) (De, 1938) – Leni Riefenstahl
- Mustang (Tu, 2015) – Deniz Gamze Ergüven
- Ritual in Transfigured Time (US, 1946, experimental silent short) – Maya Deren
- Khaneh siah ast (The House Is Black) (Ir, 1963, documentary short) – Forough Farrokhzad
- Niú pí (Oxhide) (Cn, 2005) – Liu Jiayin
- Visages Villages (Faces Places) (F, 2017, documentary) – Agnès Varda and JR
- Olympia 2. Teil — Fest der Schönheit (Festival of Beauty) (De, 1938) – Leni Riefenstahl
- Ostatni etap (The Last Stage) (Pl, 1948) – Wanda Jakubowska
- The Hypocrites (a.k.a. The Naked Truth) (US, 1915) – Lois Weber
- American Psycho (US, 2000) – Mary Harron
- Deutschland, bleiche Mutter (Germany, Pale Mother) (De, 1980) – Helma Sanders-Brahms
- Örökség (The Inheritance) (Hu, 1980) – Márta Mészáros
- Évolution (Evolution) (F, 2015) – Lucile Hadžihalilović

=== Sex ===
- Diabolo menthe (Peppermint Soda) (F, 1977) – Diane Kurys
- Innocence (Innocence) (F, 2004) – Lucile Hadžihalilović
- But I'm a Cheerleader (US, 1999) – Jamie Babbit
- Mossane (Sn, 1996) – Safi Faye
- Attenberg (Gr, 2010) – Athina Rachel Tsangari
- Dogfight (US, 1991) – Nancy Savoca
- Mr Pascal (GB, 1979, animation) – Alison de Vere
- American Honey (GB/US, 2015) – Andrea Arnold
- Under the Skin (GB, 1997) – Carine Adler
- Le Bonheur ("Happiness", F, 1965) – Agnès Varda
- Unsichtbare Gegner (Invisible Adversaries) (At, 1977, experimental) – Valie Export
- Desert Hearts (US, 1985) – Donna Deitch
- The Future (US, 2011) – Miranda July
- XXY (Ar, 2007) – Lucía Puenzo
- Toni Erdmann (De, 2016) – Maren Ade
- La Captive (The Captive) (F/B, 2000) – Chantal Akerman
- American Psycho (US, 2000) – Mary Harron
- À ma sœur! (Fat Girl) (F, 2001) – Catherine Breillat
- The Diary of a Teenage Girl (US, 2015) – Marielle Heller
- Tore tanzt (Nothing Bad Can Happen) (De, 2013) – Katrin Gebbe
- O Amor Natural (Nl, 1996, documentary) – Heddy Honigmann

=== Home ===
- Ung Flukt (The Wayward Girl) (No, 1959) – Edith Carlmar
- Zacharovana Desna (The Enchanted Desna) (SU, 1964) – Yuliya Solntseva
- Ratcatcher (GB, 1999) – Lynne Ramsay
- Hedi Schneider steckt fest (Hedi Schneider Is Stuck) (De, 2015) – Sonja Heiss
- Nattlek (Night Games) (Se, 1966) – Mai Zetterling
- Niú pí (Oxhide) (Cn, 2005) – Liu Jiayin
- Tailpiece (GB, 1976, short) – Margaret Tait
- Khaneh siah ast (The House Is Black) (Ir, 1963, documentary short) – Forough Farrokhzad
- Safe (GB, 1993, episode of ScreenPlay) – Antonia Bird
- Home (Ch, 2008) – Ursula Meier
- Povest plamennykh let (Chronicle of Flaming Years) (SU, 1961) – Yuliya Solntseva
- "Nachalo nevedomogo veka" ("Homeland of Electricity"), segment of Nachalo nevedomogo veka (Beginning of an Unknown Era) (SU, 1967) – Larisa Shepitko

=== Religion ===
- The Hypocrites (a.k.a. The Naked Truth) (US, 1915) – Lois Weber
- Gehenu Lamai (Girls) (SL, 1978) – Sumitra Peries
- Khovanshchina (SU, 1959, musical) – Vera Stroyeva
- La niña santa (The Holy Girl) (Ar, 2004) – Lucrecia Martel
- "Nachalo nevedomogo veka" ("Homeland of Electricity"), segment of Nachalo nevedomogo veka (Beginning of an Unknown Era) (SU, 1967) – Larisa Shepitko
- Priest (GB, 1994) – Antonia Bird
- Lourdes (At/F, 2009) – Jessica Hausner
- Persepolis (F/US, 2007, animation) – Vincent Paronnaud, Marjane Satrapi

=== Work ===
- The Future (US, 2011) – Miranda July
- American Honey (GB/US, 2015) – Andrea Arnold
- Baby ryazanskie (Women of Ryazan) (SU, 1927, silent) – Olga Preobrazhenskaya, Ivan Pravov
- Araya (Ve, 1959) – Margot Benacerraf
- "Nachalo nevedomogo veka" ("Homeland of Electricity"), segment of Nachalo nevedomogo veka (Beginning of an Unknown Era) (SU, 1967) – Larisa Shepitko
- O něčem jiném (Something Different) (Cz, 1963) – Věra Chytilová
- Nana (F, 2011) – Valérie Massadian [fr]
- Jeanne Dielman, 23 quai du Commerce, 1080 Bruxelles (B/F, 1975) – Chantal Akerman
- The Selfish Giant (GB, 2013) – Clio Barnard
- Skyscraper (US, 1959, documentary short) – Shirley Clarke, Willard Van Dyke
- Monster (US, 2003) – Patty Jenkins
- Sherrybaby (US, 2006) – Laurie Collyer
- American Psycho (US, 2000) – Mary Harron
- Devotion: A Film About Ogawa Productions (US, 2000, documentary) – Barbara Hammer
- Chircales (The Brickmakers) (Co, 1972, documentary) – Marta Rodriguez, Jorge Silva
- Samt al-qusūr (The Silences of the Palace) (Tu, 1994) – Moufida Tlatli

=== Politics ===
- Zacharovana Desna (The Enchanted Desna) (SU, 1964) – Yuliya Solntseva
- Dans ma peau (In My Skin) (F, 2002) – Marina de Van
- Padenie dinastii Romanovykh (The Fall of the Romanov Dynasty) (SU, 1927, compilation film) – Esfir Shub
- Triumpf des Willens (The Triumph of the Will) (De, 1935) – Leni Riefenstahl
- Bhaji on the Beach (GB, 1993) – Gurinder Chadha
- Digeh che khabar? (What Else Is New?) – Tahmineh Milani
- El premio (The Prize) (Ar, 2011) – Paula Markovitch
- Tomka dhe shokët e tij (Tomka and His Friends) (Al, 1977) – Xhanfize Keko
- Melodiya dlya sharmanki (Melody for a Street Organ) (Ua, 2009) – Kira Muratova
- Divorce Iranian Style (Ir/GB, 1998, documentary) – Kim Longinotto, Ziba Mir-Hosseini
- Drowned Out (GB, 2002, documentary) – Franny Armstrong
- Strange Days (US, 1995) – Kathryn Bigelow
- Koibumi (Love Letter) (Jp, 1953) – Kinuyo Tanaka
- Cuba, an African Odyssey (F, 2007, documentary) – Jihan El-Tahri
- Finsterworld (De, 2013) – Frauke Finsterwalder
- Nimeh-ye Penhan (The Hidden Half) (Ir, 2001) – Tahmineh Milani

=== Gear Change ===
- Selma (US, 2014) – Ava DuVernay
- Bande de filles (Girlhood) (F, 2014) – Céline Sciamma
- Orlando (GB, 1992) – Sally Potter
- Milarepa (It, 1973) – Liliana Cavani
- Astenicheskiy sindrom (The Asthenic Syndrome) (SU, 1989) – Kira Muratova
- The Connection (US, 1961, found footage) – Shirley Clarke

=== Comedy ===
- Jumpin Jack Flash (US, 1986) – Penny Marshall
- Big (US, 1988) – Penny Marshall
- I've Heard the Mermaids Singing (Ca, 1987) – Patricia Rozema
- Appropriate Behaviour (GB, 2014) – Desiree Akhavan
- The Trouble with Angels (US, 1966) – Ida Lupino
- A New Leaf (US, 1971) – Elaine May
- The Heartbreak Kid (US, 1972) – Elaine May
- Obvious Child (US, 2014) – Gillian Robespierre
- But I'm a Cheerleader (US, 1999) – Jamie Babbit
- Fjols til fjells (Fools in the Mountains) – Edith Carlmar
- El camino (The Path) (Es, 1963) – Ana Mariscal
- Wayne's World (US, 1992) – Penelope Spheeris
- Ciało (Body) (Pl, 2015) – Małgorzata Szumowska
- Marlina Si Pembunuh dalam Empat Babak (Marlina the Murderer in Four Acts) (Id, 2017) – Mouly Surya
- Privarzaniyat balon (The Tied Up Balloon) (Bu, 1962) – Binka Zhelyazkova

=== Melodrama ===
- Shoes (US, 1916, silent) – Lois Weber
- Døden er et kjærtegn (Death Is a Caress) (No, 1949) – Edith Carlmar
- Chekhovskie motivy (Chekhov's Motifs) (Ua/Ru, 2004 – Kira Muratova
- Ty i ya (You and Me) (SU, 1971) – Larisa Shepitko
- Tiefland (Lowlands) (De, 1954) – Leni Riefenstahl
- Zabitá neděle (Squandered Sunday) (Cz, 1969) – Drahomíra Vihanová
- We Were Young (Bu, 1961) – Binka Zhelyazkova
- Koibumi (Love Letter) (Jp, 1953) – Kinuyo Tanaka

=== Sci-Fi ===
- The Matrix (US, 1999) – The Wachowskis
- Wonder Woman (US, 2017) – Patty Jenkins
- Jupiter Ascending (US/Au, 2015) – The Wachowskis
- Tank Girl (US, 1995) – Rachel Talalay
- The Handmaid's Tale (US/Ca, 2017–2025, tv series) – Reed Morano
- Unsichtbare Gegner (Invisible Adversaries) (At, 1977, experimental) – Valie Export
- Az én XX. századom (My 20th Century) (Hu, 1989) – Ildikó Enyedi

=== Horror and Hell ===
- Huis clos (No Exit) (F, 1954) – Jacqueline Audry, Britt Pitre
- Ellen (GB, 2016) – Mahalia Belo
- 1947: Earth (Earth) (Ca/In, 1998) – Deepa Mehta
- Astenicheskiy sindrom (The Asthenic Syndrome) (SU, 1989) – Kira Muratova
- Textê Reş (Blackboards) (Ir, 2000) – Samira Makhmalbaf
- Tore tanzt (Nothing Bad Can Happen) (De, 2013) – Katrin Gebbe
- Safe (GB, 1993, episode of ScreenPlay) – Antonia Bird
- NabelFabel ("Navel Fable", 1984) – Mara Mattuschka
- A Girl Walks Home Alone at Night (US, 2014) – Ana Lily Amirpour
- Mossane (Sn, 1996) – Safi Faye
- We Were Young (Bu, 1961) – Binka Zhelyazkova
- The Babadook (Au, 2014) – Jennifer Kent
- Archipelago (GB, 2010) – Joanna Hogg
- Swimmer (GB, 2012, short) – Lynne Ramsay
- A Girl in the River: The Price of Forgiveness (US/Pk, 2015, documentary) – Sharmeen Obaid-Chinoy
- Samt al-qusūr (The Silences of the Palace) (Tu, 1994) – Moufida Tlatli
- Lore (Au/De, 2012) – Cate Shortland
- Outrage (US, 1950) – Ida Lupino
- Huis clos (No Exit) (F, 1954) – Jacqueline Audry, Britt Pitre

=== Tension ===
- Demon Lover Diary (US, 1980, documentary) – Joel DeMott
- Dreams of a Life (GB/Ie, 2011) – Carol Morley
- Archipelago (GB, 2010) – Joanna Hogg
- Blue Steel (US, 1990) – Kathryn Bigelow
- Hotell (Se, 2013) – Lisa Langseth
- Évolution (Evolution) (F, 2015) – Lucile Hadžihalilović
- Ung Flukt (The Wayward Girl) (No, 1959) – Edith Carlmar
- The Peacemaker (US, 1997) – Mimi Leder
- De stilte rond Christine M. (A Question of Silence) (Nl, 1982) – Marleen Gorris
- Selma (US, 2014) – Ava DuVernay
- Astenicheskiy sindrom (The Asthenic Syndrome) (SU, 1989) – Kira Muratova

=== Stasis ===
- Plätze in Städten (Places in Cities) (De, 1998) – Angela Schanelec
- Brownian Movement (Nl/De, 2010) – Nanouk Leopold
- Astenicheskiy sindrom (The Asthenic Syndrome) (SU, 1989) – Kira Muratova
- "Terra firma" (part of Colour Poems) (GB, 1974, short) – Margaret Tait
- Kid (B/NL/De, 2012) – Fien Troch
- De stilte rond Christine M. (A Question of Silence) (Nl, 1982) – Marleen Gorris
- Les Rendez-vous d'Anna (The Meetings of Anna) (B/F/De, 1978) – Chantal Akerman
- Double Tide (US, ?) – Sharon Lockhart
- Hamaca Paraguaya (Paraguayan Hammock) (Py, 2006) – Paz Encina
- Khamosh Pani (Silent Waters) (In/Pk, 2003) – Sabiha Sumar
- Marlina Si Pembunuh dalam Empat Babak (Marlina the Murderer in Four Acts) (Id, 2017) – Mouly Surya

=== Leave Out ===
- Chekhovskie motivy (Chekhov's Motifs) (Ua/Ru, 2004 – Kira Muratova
- Je, tu, il, elle ("I, You, He, She", F/B, 1974) – Chantal Akerman
- Baby ryazanskie (Women of Ryazan) (SU, 1927, silent) – Olga Preobrazhenskaya, Ivan Pravov
- Wadjda – Haifaa Al-Mansour
- The Sealed Soil – Marva Nabili
- The Day I'll Never Forget (GB, 2002) – Kim Longinotto
- Baxter, Vera Baxter (F, 1977) – Marguerite Duras
- Proof (1991) – Jocelyn Moorhouse
- Povest plamennykh let (Chronicle of Flaming Years) (SU, 1961) – Yuliya Solntseva

=== Reveal ===
- Westworld (US, 2016–2022) – Lisa Joy, Jonathan Nolan
- Pas gjurmëve (After the Tracks) (Al, 1978) – Xhanfise Keko
- Morvern Callar (GB/Ca, 2002) – Lynne Ramsay
- Povest plamennykh let (Chronicle of Flaming Years) (SU, 1961) – Yuliya Solntseva
- Koibumi (Love Letter) (Jp, 1953) – Kinuyo Tanaka
- Baby ryazanskie (Women of Ryazan) (SU, 1927, silent) – Olga Preobrazhenskaya, Ivan Pravov
- Lourdes (At/F, 2009) – Jessica Hausner
- Stories We Tell (Ca, 2012, documentary) – Sarah Polley
- The Wonders – Alice Rohrwacher

=== Memory ===
- Elena (Nl, 2012) – Petra Costa
- I lykaina (The She-Wolf) (Gr, 1951) – Maria Plyta
- Pet Sematary (US, 1989) – Mary Lambert
- Poem of the Sea (SU, 1958) – Yuliya Solntseva
- Pora umierac (Time to Die) (Pl, 2007) – Dorota Kędzierzawska
- Faunovo velmi pozdní odpoledne (The Very Late Afternoon of a Faun) (Cz, 1983) – Věra Chytilová
- Älskande par (Loving Couples) (Se, 1964) – Mai Zetterling
- Zacharovana Desna (The Enchanted Desna) (SU, 1964) – Yuliya Solntseva
- Olympia 1. Teil — Fest der Völker (Festival of Nations) (De, 1938) – Leni Riefenstahl
- Mille soleils (A Thousand Suns) (F, 2013, documentary short) – Mati Diop
- Return (US, 2011) – Liza Johnson

=== Time ===
- Falling Leaves (US, 1912) – Alice Guy-Blaché
- Les Rendez-vous d'Anna (The Meetings of Anna) (B/F/De, 1978) – Chantal Akerman
- Az én XX. századom (My 20th Century) (Hu, 1989) – Ildikó Enyedi
- Däumlienchen (Thumbelina) (GB, 1954, animation short) – Lotte Reiniger
- Monster (US, 2003) – Patty Jenkins
- Something Better to Come (Pl/Dk, 2014, documentary) – Hanna Polak
- The Gold Diggers (GB, 1983) – Sally Potter
- Ravenous (GB/US/MX, 1999) – Antonia Bird
- Go! Go! Go! (US, 1964, experimental short) – Marie Menken
- I lykaina (The She-Wolf) (Gr, 1951) – Maria Plyta
- The Future (US, 2011) – Miranda July
- Orlando (GB, 1992) – Sally Potter
- Roozi ke zan shodam (The Day I Became a Woman) (Ir, 2000) – Marziyeh Meshkini

=== Life Inside ===
- La Coquille et le Clergyman (The Seashell and the Clergyman) (F, 1928) – Germaine Dulac
- Kryl'ya (Wings) (SU, 1966) – Larisa Shepitko
- The Future (US, 2011) – Miranda July
- Bhaji on the Beach (GB, 1993) – Gurinder Chadha
- Mikey and Nicky (US, 1971) – Elaine May
- An Angel at My Table (Au, 1990) – Jane Campion
- Film About a Woman Who (US, 1974, experimental) – Yvonne Rainer
- La Zerda ou Les chants de l'oubli (Zerda or The Songs of Forgetting) (Dz, 1982, experimental documentary) – Assia Djebar

=== The Meaning of Life ===
- Together (GB, 1956, city symphony) – Lorenza Mazzetti
- Rusalka (Mermaid) (Ru, 2007) – Anna Melikian
- Western (De, 2017) – Valeska Grisebach
- Now I'm Thirteen (Mm, 2013, short) – Shin Daewe
- Les Rendez-vous d'Anna (The Meetings of Anna) (B/F/De, 1978) – Chantal Akerman
- Betoniyö (Concrete Night) (Fi, 2013) – Pirjo Honkasalo
- Woman (Lv, 2002) – Signe Baumane
- Rue Cases-Nègres (Sugar Cane Alley) (F, 1983 – Euzhan Palcy
- Digeh che khabar? (What Else Is New?) – Tahmineh Milani

=== Love ===
- Qing chun ji (Sacrificed Youth) (Cn, 1986) – Zhang Nuanxing
- Gehenu Lamai (Girls) (SL, 1978) – Sumitra Peries
- Me and You and Everyone We Know (US, 2005) – Miranda July
- Testről és lélekről (On Body and Soul) (HU, 2017) – Ildikó Enyedi
- Ghesse-ha (Tales) (Ir, 2014) – Rakhshān Banietemad
- The Piano (Au, 1993) – Jane Campion
- Where I Am Is Here (GB, 1964, short) – Margaret Tait
- The Intruder (2004) – Claire Denis
- An Education (GB/US, 2009) – Lone Scherfig
- Ung Flukt (The Wayward Girl) (No, 1959) – Edith Carlmar
- Namueomneun san (Treeless Mountain) (SKo, 2008) – So Yong Kim
- Mon Roi (My King) (F, 2015) – Maïwenn
- Mustang (Tu, 2015) – Deniz Gamze Ergüven
- Mimang-in (The Widow) (Kr, 1954) – Park Nam-ok
- Tou4 Ze2 (A Simple Life) (Hk/Cn, 2011) – Ann Hui
- Heart of a Dog (US, 2015) – Laurie Anderson

=== Death ===
- Chibusa yo eien nare (The Eternal Breasts) (Jp, 1955) – Kinuyo Tanaka
- Dōngfāng Hóng (The East Is Red) (Ch, 1965) – Wang Ping
- Privarzaniyat balon (The Tied Up Balloon) (Bu, 1962) – Binka Zhelyazkova
- Le Lit ("the bed", B/Ch, 1982) – Marion Hänsel
- Hateship, Loveship (US, 2013) – Liza Johnson
- The Street (Ca, 1976, animation short) – Caroline Leaf
- Crulic – Drumul spre dincolo (Crulic: The Path to Beyond) (Ro/Pl, 2011) – Anca Damian
- El camino (The Path) (Es, 1963) – Ana Mariscal
- Vergine giurata (Sworn Virgin) (It, 2015) – Laura Bispuri
- The Selfish Giant (GB, 2013) – Clio Barnard
- Tonio (NL, 2016) – Paula van der Oest
- Pora umierac (Time to Die) (Pl, 2007) – Dorota Kędzierzawska

=== Endings ===
- Hotel Very Welcome (De, 2007) – Sonja Heiss
- "Nachalo nevedomogo veka" ("Homeland of Electricity"), segment of Nachalo nevedomogo veka (Beginning of an Unknown Era) (SU, 1967) – Larisa Shepitko
- Gehenu Lamai (Girls) (SL, 1978) – Sumitra Peries
- Koibumi (Love Letter) (Jp, 1953) – Kinuyo Tanaka
- Hard, Fast and Beautiful! (US, 1951) – Ida Lupino
- Born in Flames (US, 1983, docufiction) – Lizzie Borden
- 35 Rhums (35 Shots of Rum) (F, 2008) – Claire Denis
- Ritual in Transfigured Time (US, 1946, experimental silent short) – Maya Deren

=== Song and Dance ===
- Ren – Gui – Qing (Woman, Demon, Human) – Shuqin Huang
- Boris Godunov (SU, 1954) – Vera Stroyeva
- John Macfadyen (GB, 1970, short) – Margaret Tait
- Le piano irrésistible (The Irresistible Piano) (F, 1907, silent short) – Alice Guy-Blaché
- Le Lit ("the bed", B/Ch, 1982) – Marion Hänsel
- Elena (Br, 2012, documentary) – Petra Costa
- Aldri annet enn bråk (Nothing but Trouble) (No, 1954) – Edith Carlmar
- Sehnsucht (Longing) (De, 2006) – Valeska Grisebach
- Bande de filles (Girlhood) (F, 2014) – Céline Sciamma
- O Ébrio (The Drunkard) (Br, 1946) – Gilda de Abreu
- Crossing Delancey (US, 1988) – Joan Micklin Silver
- Sambizanga (Ao/F, 1972) – Sarah Maldoror
- The Connection (US, 1961, found footage) – Shirley Clarke
- Le Bonheur ("Happiness", F, 1965) – Agnès Varda
- Dance, Girl, Dance (US, 1940) – Dorothy Arzner, Roy Del Ruth
- L'une chante, l'autre pas (One Sings, the Other Doesn't) (F, 1977) – Agnès Varda
- Attenberg (Gr, 2010) – Athina Rachel Tsangari
- Lemonade (US, 2016) – Beyoncé Knowles, Kahlil Joseph
