= Mykola Vinhranovsky =

Ukrainian author and filmmaker

- Микола Вінграновський
- Born: November 7, 1936; Pervomaisk, Ukrainian SSR, Soviet Union
- Died: May 26, 2004 (aged 67); Kyiv, Ukraine
- Citizenship: Soviet Union; Ukraine
- Education: Gerasimov Institute of Cinematography
- Occupations: poet, writer, actor, filmmaker, translator
- Movement: Sixtiers
- Spouse: Lydia (first marriage)
- Awards: Shevchenko National Prize (1984)

Signature
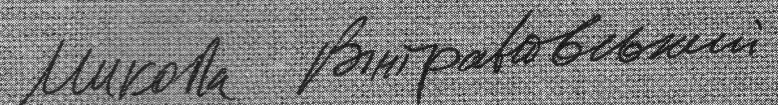

Mykola Stepanovych Vinhranovsky (Ukrainian: Микола Степанович Вінграновський, romanized: Mykola Stepanovych Vinhranovskyi; 7 November 1936, Pervomaisk, Ukrainian SSR–26 May 2004, Kyiv) was a Ukrainian and Soviet writer, poet, filmmaker and actor. His works combined Ukrainian folk traditions with modern lyricism.

== Biography ==
Born in Pervomaisk, now part of Mykolaiv Oblast of Ukraine, Vinhranovskyi studied at Kyiv Institute of Theatre Art, but later transferred to All-Union Institute of Cinematography in Moscow, where his mentor was Alexander Dovzhenko. In 1957 created his first poetry. After his graduation in 1960, Vinhranovsky debuted as an actor in Yuliya Solntseva's film Chronicle of Flaming Years, where he played the main hero. In 1962 Vinhranovsky published his first poetry collection Atomic Preludes (Ukrainian: Атомні прелюди), which caused controversy due to its philosophical generalizations of history, humanistic pathos, complicated metaphors and plenty of allegories. His further works developed the themes present in his early compositions. In 1964 he debuted as film director. In 1984 Vinhranovsky was awarded Shevchenko State Prize of Ukrainian SSR. He died in 2004 in Kyiv.

== Public activities ==
Vinhranovsky was a member of the Artistic Youths' Club. A member of the Sixtiers movement, in 1962 he travelled to Moscow along with Ivan Dziuba and Ivan Drach in order to meet with Nikita Khrushchev as a representative of Ukrainian intelligentsia. Between 1989 and 1993, Vinhranovsky served as the first president of PEN Ukraine.

== Works ==
Vinhranovsky's poetic works were permeated with contemplations of makind's fate in face of nuclear threat. The literary hero of his poems is characterized by internal freedom, feeling of personal responsibility for the well-being of humanity and belief in the victory of good. Many of his verse are dedicated to nature in its eternal motion and metamorphosis. Vinhranovsky also created romantic poems and experimented with various forms such as haiku, compositions in hexameter and elegiac couplets.

Along with poetry, Vinhranovsky also created works of prose. His writings in this sphere are characterized with high emotionality, spiritual depth and intimate connection with nature, as well as employment of fairytale elements, fantasy and humour. Many of his prose texts were written for children and had a didactic character. Vinhranovsky also authored several film scripts, and published a book of memoirs about Alexander Dovzhenko. He also translated verse of Boris Pasternak, Nikoloz Baratashvili and several other authors into Ukrainian.

A three-volume set of Vinhranovskyi's selected works was published in 2004.

=== Notable publications ===
==== Poems ====
- Atomic Preludes (Атомні прелюди, 1962)
- One Hundred Poems (Сто поезій, 1967)
- On the Silver Bank (На срібнім березі, 1978)
- With Warm Lips and Golden Eye (Губами теплими і оком золотим, 1984)
- I Love This Woman (Цю жінку я люблю, 1990)
- From the Days Embraced by You (З обійманих тобою днів, 1990)
- Love, Do Not Say Farewell (Любове, не прощавай, 1997)

==== Prose works ====
- Siromanets (Сіроманець, 1977)
- Little Gosling (Гусенятко, 1978)
- In the Depth of Rains (У глибині дощів, 1979)
- Summer on the Desna (Літо на Десні, 1983)
- Tied Low (Низенько пов'язана, 1985)
- Horse at the Sunset (Кінь на вечірній зорі, 1987)
- Nalyvaiko (Наливайко, 1991) - novel

==== Children's literature ====
- Andriyko-Hovoriyko (Андрійко-Говорійко, 1970)
- Pervinka (Первінка, 1971)
- Poppy (Мак, 1973)
- Summer Morning (Літній ранок, 1976)
- Summer Evening (Літній вечір, 1979)
- Swallow by the Window (Ластівка біля вікна, 1981)
- Goodnight (На добраніч, 1983)

==== Memoirs ====
- One Year With Dovzhenko (Рік з Довженком, 1975)

=== Films ===
==== Feature ====
- Chronicle of Flaming Years (1961) - Ivan Orliuk
- Squadron Turns West (1964) - director
- Coast of Hope (1967) - director
- Duma about Brytanka (1969) - director
- Klymko (1984)

==== Documentary ====
- Blue Sisters of Humans (1966) - director
- A Word About Andriy Malyshko (1983) - director
- Dovzhenko. Diary 1941-1945 (1993) - director

== Sources ==
- Українська Літературна Енциклопедія. — К., 1988. — Т. 1: А-Г. — С. 317–328.
