= Between Heaven and Earth (1992 film) =

Film by Marion Hänsel

- French: Sur la terre comme au ciel
- Directed by: Marion Hänsel
- Written by: Jaco Van Dormael; Laurette Vankeerberghen
- Produced by: Eric van Beuren; Victoria Borras; Rosa Romero
- Starring: Carmen Maura; Jean-Pierre Cassel; Didier Bezace; Samuel Mussen
- Cinematography: Josep M. Civit
- Edited by: Susana Rossberg
- Music by: Takashi Kako
- Release date: September 11, 1992 (Canada)
- Running time: 80 minutes
- Country: Belgium
- Language: French

Between Heaven and Earth (French: Sur la terre comme au ciel), also exhibited under the title On Earth As It Is In Heaven, is a 1992 film directed by Belgian director Marion Hänsel and starring Carmen Maura.

== Plot ==
Maura plays a pregnant television reporter who discovers that an increasing number of unborn babies (including her own) are telling their mothers they don't want to be born, or are born stillborn when induced.

== Reception ==
The film was not well-received by Belgian critics. Luc Honore of Le Soir thought that the film's concept was thin and might have been more successful as a short film. The New York Times critic Stephen Holden described the film as "deadly earnest" and "an uneasy hybrid of science fiction and medical information" populated by "programmatic stick figures". Jay Carr of The Boston Globe thought it was "a high-minded save-the-planet cri du coeur" that did not fully sustain its premise and energy but "there's never any doubt that its heart is in the right place." In a brief review for the film's exhibition at the 1992 American Film Institute International Film Festival, Los Angeles Times critic Michael Wilmington said that it "fails as social comment and horror story".
