= Ukraine in Flames =

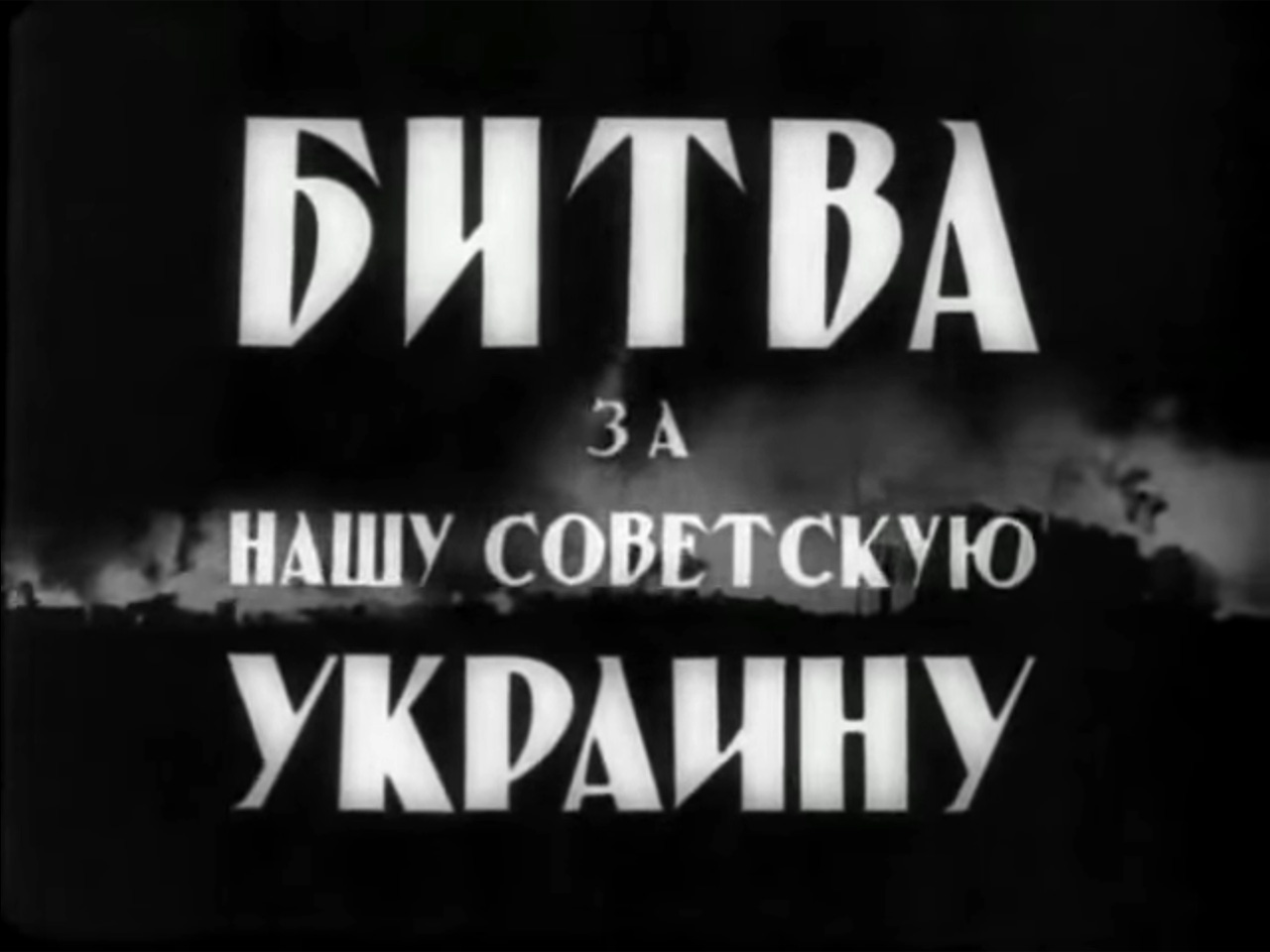
- Directed by: Oleksandr Dovzhenko; Yuliya Solntseva
- Written by: Oleksandr Dovzhenko
- Produced by: V. Murin
- Narrated by: Oleksandr Dovzhenko
- Edited by: Oleksandr Dovzhenko
- Distributed by: Central Newsreel Studio; Ukrainian Newsreel
- Release date: 1943
- Running time: 80 minutes
- Country: Soviet Union
- Language: Russian

Ukraine in Flames (in Russian: «Битва за нашу Советскую Украину», romanized: Bitva za nashu Sovetskuyu Ukrainu, lit. '"Battle for our Soviet Ukraine"') is a 1943 Soviet documentary war film by Ukrainian director Oleksandr Dovzhenko and Yuliya Solntseva. It is Dovzhenko's second World War II documentary, and dealt with the Battle of Kharkov. The film incorporates German footage of the invasion of Ukraine, which was later captured by the Soviets.

== Development ==
Dovzhenko's diary contained notes for the film, originally conceived as a conversation between a concentration camp inmate and a camp guard, both Ukrainians, having a conversation through a barbed wire fence. In the proposed final scene of the film, they seize each other, the guard tries to chokes the prisoner and the prisoner refuses to let go for fear of being shot by the guard, and are found dead the next morning in each other's arm, wrapped in barbed wire.

== Plot ==
The film chronicles the devastation of Ukraine during World War II and the efforts of its liberation and rebuilding by the Soviet people and military. The plot focuses on the events of autumn 1943 on the southern fronts of the German-Soviet war, showcasing both the immense destruction inflicted by the Nazi invasion and the resilience of the Soviet forces and civilians. The film opens with scenes of Nazi forces bombing Ukrainian towns, villages, and cities, juxtaposed with pre-war images of Ukraine's cultural and industrial vibrancy, including coal mining in the Donbas, steel production, and wheat harvests.

As the Red Army advances, the documentary captures key moments, including the liberation of cities like Kharkiv and Kyiv, the resilience of partisans led by Sidor Kovpak, and collective efforts to rebuild homes and communities. The film concludes with images of the triumphant return of Soviet forces, the emotional celebrations of liberated citizens, and tributes to Ukrainian Heroes of the Soviet Union.

== Details ==
The film features prominent figures like Nikita Khrushchev and T.D. Lysenko, underscoring Ukraine's critical role within the Soviet Union.

The film differs from its peers in that for the first time viewers of the military chronicle heard the "living voices" of soldiers. It also features a huge number of philosophical generalizations written by O. Dovzhenko in the form of lyrical reflections, voiced by Leonid Khmara.

The film includes footage of the trophy German newsreel.
