= The Practice of Love (film) =

1985 film

- Film poster
- Directed by: Valie Export
- Written by: Valie Export
- Produced by: Christoph Holch
- Starring: Adelheid Arndt
- Cinematography: Jörg Schmidt-Reitwein
- Edited by: Juno Sylva Englander
- Release date: January 1985
- Running time: 90 minutes
- Countries: West Germany; Austria
- Language: German

The Practice of Love (German: Die Praxis der Liebe) is a 1985 West German-Austrian drama film written by and directed by Valie Export. It was entered into the 35th Berlin International Film Festival.

== Cast ==
- Adelheid Arndt as Judith Wiener
- Rüdiger Vogler as Dr. Alfons Schlögel
- Hagnot Elischka as Dr. Josef Frischkoff
- Franz Kantner as Reinhard Flegel
- Paul Muller as French Industrialist
- Kurt Radlecker as Police officer
- Adolf Lukan as Head of the Police
- Günther Nenning as Chief TV Editor
- Wolfgang Böck as First Arms Smuggler
- Jürgen Lier as Businessman
- Traute Furthner as Flegel's Mother
- Paul Mühlhauser as Concierge in Vienna
- Marion Bockmann as Peepshow-Girl
- Liane Wagner as Frau Schlögel
- Gary Indiana as American
