= Nikos Kavvadias =

Greek poet (1910–1975)

Nikos Kavvadias (/kævəˈdiːəs/; Greek: Νίκος Καββαδίας [kavaˈðias]; 11 January 1910 – 10 February 1975) was a Greek poet, writer and a sailor by profession. He used his travels around the world, the life at sea and its adventures, as powerful metaphors for the escape of ordinary people, outside the boundaries of reality. His poems are widely regarded as belonging to symbolism, and he has been characterized by some as a poète maudit.

== Early life and education ==
Kavvadias was born in Nikolsk-Ussuriysky (now Ussuriysk in the Primorsky Krai region of Russia), where his father was a merchant. He believed that this had established a permanent connection between him and the Far East as he wrote in one of his short stories titled "Li". His parents were Greek, originating from the island of Kefalonia and as a young child he had the opportunity to travel extensively. His family returned to their island of origin for a few years before finally moving to Piraeus in 1921. He wrote his first poems while in school.

In 1928, after having graduated from high school he sat an entrance exam for medical school but as his father fell sick the same year, young Kavvadias was forced to get a job as an office clerk in a shipping company to help his family. He lasted only a few months and after his father's death, he went on board the freighter ship Agios Nikolaos (Saint Nicholas) as a sailor. For the following years he worked on freighter boats, returning home wretched and penniless. At that point he aspired to train as a captain but settled for a diploma as a radio officer instead, which he got in 1939. By that time however, World War II had started and he was sent to fight in Albania.

During the German occupation of Greece, he joined the National Liberation Front (EAM) and became a member of the Communist Party. When the war ended in 1944, he embarked again and traveled continuously, this time as a radio officer, until November 1974. These experiences at sea and the exotic ports he visited became the material for his poetry. Returning from his last trip and as he was preparing the publication of his third collection of poems, he died suddenly from a stroke on 10 February 1975 after only three months off sea.

Since his death, his poetry has been popularized in Greece, partly because of Thanos Mikroutsikos who released an album with Kavvadias's poetry set to his music in his very popular albums Σταυρός του Νότου (Southern Cross) [1979] and Γραμμές των Οριζόντων (Horizons' Lines) [1991].

== Early writings ==
His first collection of poems, Marabou was published in 1933 when Kavvadias was in his early twenties and carries the spirit of a romantic young man, impressed with the marvels of the world. Most of the poems tell half-fictitious stories transpiring at sea and at the different ports Kavvadias visited during his journeys. The collection begins with a poem written in the first person about the writer's tragic love for a young wealthy girl he met on board and who later ended as a poor prostitute that he could barely recognise. Other poems recount the stories of a washed out Norwegian captain who died homesick watching a ship sailing to the Lofoten and of an enchanted dagger carrying the curse that its owner shall kill someone they love. Artistically, he was influenced by French literature and the poet Charles Baudelaire whom he cites in many of his works. Like a lot of Greek poetry, Kavvadias's work is characterized by a deep feeling of nostalgia.

== Later works ==
First trip – a southern freight, by chance -
bad sleep, malaria, difficult watches.
Strangely deceptive, the lights of the Indies -
they say you don't see them at a first glance....

Kuro Siwo (1947)

His other collections are titled Fog, published in 1947 and Traverso published after his death in 1975. His second short story titled "Of War", which was to be his last and was also published after his death in 1987, recounts the story of his rescue by a local during a storm. His experiences during World War II affected him profoundly and as a result, his later works became increasingly political and in support of both the communists in Greece and the general leftist movements throughout the world. One of these poems is about the death of Argentinian revolutionary Ernesto (Che) Guevara, written as an answer to the criticisms received by some of his more polemic comrades who thought that his poems over-romanticized the harsh and dangerous life of sailors who were potential symbols of class struggle.

Another is about the execution of Andalusian poet and playwright Federico García Lorca by the Francoists which, in the poem, is compared with the destruction of the Greek village of Distomo and the executions at Kaisariani which were carried out by the Nazi forces that occupied Greece.

His only novel The Shift was published in 1954 and recounts the stories told by the sailors on their night shift at the ship's bridge. Images from exotic places, prostitutes, captains gone mad and memories of the war blend together, to form a dreamy world of lucid forms, part fictional, part true. He is popular among Greeks and his best poems are taught at schools. He is considered by many to embody much of the "Greek soul" because of his romantic affiliation with the sea and its journeys and for his genuinely humane outlook.

A selection of his poetry, with some of his shorter prose, translated into English by Simon Darragh, is available under the title Wireless Operator from the London Publisher Enitharmon.

== Poems set to music ==
Since 1967, many of Kavvadias' poems have been incorporated in the music of other Greek artists. Though, in most cases it was one or two of his poems that were set to music and released alongside other artists' songs, there were some major exceptions that involved multiple of Kavvadias' poems. Panos Savvopoulos was the first artist to set Kavadias' poems to music when he released his disk Episode in 1971. His poem Mal du départ was set to music by Giannis Spanos and released in 1975. Thanos Mikroutsikos released his The Southern Cross album in 1979 where he set 11 of Kavvadias' poems to music, featuring other prominent Greek artists, such as Vasilis Papakonstantinou. The album was negatively received in the beginning. In 1986, record company Minos released the record Nikos Kavvadias, S/S Ionion set to music performed by Ilias Ariotis and Noti Chasapi. Thanos Mikroutsikos made a great comeback to the subject in 1991, when he released his record Lines of the Horizons which included a whopping 17 of Kavvadias' poems set to song. Though many of the songs were the same as in the 1979 album - only reperformed - the record was very well received.

Some of the poems that have been set to music since 1967 are:

- 1979: Woman (Γυναίκα)
- 1979: Esmeralda (Εσμεράλδα)
- 1979: Cambay's water
- 1979: Federico Garcia Lorca
- 1979: Kuro Siwo
- 1984: Black and White
- 1986: Yara yara
- 1987: The Monkey (Η μαϊμού)
- 1989: Letter to a Poet (Γράμμα σ’ έναν ποιητή)
- 1992: A bord de l΄ aspasia

== Works ==
=== Poetry ===
- 1933: Marabu (Μαραμπού, Marampou)
- 1947: Fog (Πούσι)
- 1975: Traverso (Τραβέρσο)
- 1975: Mal du départ (Ιδανικός Κι Ανάξιος Εραστής, Idanikós Ki Anáxios Erastís)
- 1979: Esmeralda (Εσμεράλδα)
- 1987: The Collected Poems of Nikos Kavadias, tr. G. Holst-Warhaft [Greek and English texts]

=== Prose ===
- 1954: The Shift (Βάρδια)
- 1987: Li (Λί); on 1995 adapted to film
- 1987: Of War/On My Horse (Του Πολέμου/Στ' άλογό μου)
