= Adelheid Arndt =

German actress (born 1952)

Adelheid Arndt (born 3 January 1952, in Heidelberg) is a German actress.

== Life ==
The daughter of a chemist and a teacher after graduation, she first studied ethnology in Berlin and graduated there from 1973 to 1977 from acting school.

She started her acting career at the Grips-Theater 1976 and received a role in the film Maiden's War, set in Prague during the period between 1936 and 1946. For her leading role in the film 1+1=3 [de] (1979), in which she represented a pregnant woman between two men, she received a German Film Award, the Ernst Lubitsch Award and a Grand Prix at IFF Montreal.

The actress appeared in the 80s in several television films and series, and collaborated actively in the ZDF Children's Series Quadriga, for which she earned a prize from the European Union.

In the 90s they turned next to their work in television again, especially the theater.

Adelheid Arndt has a daughter named Johanna (1984).

== Filmography ==
- 1977: Maiden's War
- 1978: Diary of a Seducer (TV film)
- 1978: Ein unruhiges Jahr (TV film)
- 1978: Martha und Laura auf See (TV film)
- 1979: Der Landvogt von Greifensee
- 1979: 1+1=3 [de]
- 1979: Flugversuche (TV film)
- 1980: Kannst du zaubern, Opa? (TV play)
- 1981: Geld oder Leben (TV film)
- 1982: Ein Fall für zwei: Partner (TV)
- 1983: Melzer (TV film)
- 1984: Wanda (TV film)
- 1984: Chinese Boxes
- 1984: L.A.U.R.A.
- 1984: Drei Damen vom Grill (TV series, 3 episodes)
- 1985: Die Praxis der Liebe
- 1985: Geteiltes Land (short film)
- 1986: Rosa Luxemburg
- 1986: Wiedergefundene Zeit (TV film)
- 1986: Der Prinz (TV film)
- 1987: Smaragd (TV film)
- 1987: Herz mit Löffel
- 1988: Peter Strohm: Reihe 7, Grab 4 (TV)
- 1988–2003: Siebenstein (TV series)
- 1989: Ein Fall für zwei: Tod im Schlafsack (TV)
- 1989: Der blaue Mond
- 1989: Bismarck (TV film)
- 1990: Ein Fall für zwei: Schwarze Schafe (TV)
- 1992: Die Heiratsschwindlerin (TV film)
- 1993–1994: Family Passions (TV series)
- 1993: Eurocops: Alte Freunde (TV)
- 1994: Border Crossing (TV film)
- 1994: Wolffs Revier: Gesühnt (TV)
- 1999: Federmann (TV film)

== Awards ==
- German Film Awards: Film Ribbon in Gold (actress) for 1 + 1 = 3
- Ernst Lubitsch - Prize for 1 + 1 = 3
- Grand Prix de Montreal for 1 + 1 = 3
- Federal Awards for "The girl war," "Divided country" and Rosa Luxembourg
- "Prix Niki" (prize of the EU) Quadriga
- "Golden Sparrow" (German Youth Television) for Quadriga, 1997
