= Nightsongs (1984 film) =

1984 film by Marva Nabili

- Directed by: Marva Nabili
- Written by: Fae Myenne Ng
- Screenplay by: Marva Nabili
- Produced by: Thomas A. Fucci
- Starring: Mabel Kwong; David Lee; Victor Wong
- Cinematography: Benjamin Davis
- Music by: R.I.P. Hayman
- Release date: 1984
- Running time: 113 minutes
- Countries: Iran; United States
- Language: English

Nightsongs is a 1984 film by Marva Nabili. It depicts the struggles of a Chinese family in Manhattan's Chinatown.

== Cast ==
- Mabel Kwong as Chinese Vietnamese Woman
- David Lee as Fung Tak Men
- Victor Wong as Fung Leung
- Ida F.O. Chung as Fung Lai Ping
- Rose Lee as Fung Mei Fun
- Roger Chang as Fung Tak Sing
- Geoff Lee as Chinese Gang Recruiter
- George LePorte as Murray(as George LaPorte)
