= Chinese Boxes (film) =

- Directed by: Chris Petit
- Written by: L. M. Kit Carson; Chris Petit
- Produced by: Chris Sievernich
- Starring: Will Patton; Robbie Coltrane
- Cinematography: Peter Harvey
- Edited by: Fred Srp
- Music by: Günther Fischer
- Production companies: AAA Classics; Palace Production; Road Movies Filmproduktion
- Distributed by: Palace Films
- Release date: November 29, 1984 (United Kingdom)
- Running time: 87 minutes
- Countries: United Kingdom; West Germany
- Language: English

Chinese Boxes is a 1984 British-West German crime mystery thriller film directed by Chris Petit and starring Will Patton and Robbie Coltrane. The film was partially German funded.

== Cast ==
- Will Patton as Marsh
- Gottfried John as Zwemmer
- Adelheid Arndt as Sarah
- Robbie Coltrane as Harwood
- Beate Jensen as Donna
- Susanne Meierhofer as Eva
- Jonathan Kinsler as Alan
- L. M. Kit Carson as Crewcut
- Chris Sievernich as Snake
- Chris Petit as Gunsel (uncredited)
- Michael Büttner as Policeman
- Jochen von Vietinghoff as Supplier

== Production ==
Filming for Chinese Boxes was filmed in East Berlin during 1984. The film's score was composed by a Stasi informer who also lived in East Berlin.

== Release ==
Chinese Boxes premiered on 29 November 1984 in the United Kingdom. Years later the movie was screened in 2013 as part of Petit's Museum of Loneliness project, also in the United Kingdom.

== Reception ==
Critical reception was generally favorable. Derek Malcolm reviewed Chinese Boxes for The Guardian, commenting that it "looks good and is at least lively". The Independent remarked that the movie was "a quintessential Eighties riddle-thriller with a hint of Godard's Made in USA in its comic-strip flatness: it features a showdown in a paper-pulping yard, a foretaste of Petit's later preoccupation with pulped and discarded culture."

Chinese Boxes has also received a 2013 review from Chris Darke in Sight & Sound.
