= Chronicle of Flaming Years =

1960 film

Chronicle of Flaming Years (Повесть пламенных лет)
- Russian poster
- Directed by: Yuliya Solntseva
- Written by: Aleksandr Dovzhenko
- Starring: Boris Andreyev
- Cinematography: Fyodor Provorov; Aleksei Temerin
- Music by: Gavriil Popov
- Production company: Mosfilm
- Release date: May 1961
- Running time: 91 minutes
- Country: Soviet Union
- Language: Russian

Chronicle of Flaming Years (Russian: Повесть пламенных лет, romanized: Povest plamennykh let) is a 1961 Soviet World War II film directed by Yuliya Solntseva. Solntseva won the award for Best Director at the 1961 Cannes Film Festival.

== Plot ==
In 1941, as the Great Patriotic War begins, Ivan Orlyuk, a kolkhoz worker from the Dnieper region, becomes a soldier. Participating in the first battles on the Dnieper River, Ivan faces immense hardships: the occupation of Ukraine, the destruction of his village, the deaths of his parents and comrades, and a severe injury sustained during a river crossing where survival seems impossible.

Despite these trials, Ivan perseveres, ultimately fighting his way to Berlin. Upon returning home, he reunites with his fiancée, Ulyana, and takes part in the first sowing on the liberated land.

== Cast ==
- Boris Andreyev
- Antonina Bogdanova
- Zinaida Kiriyenko
- Sergei Lukyanov
- Mikhail Majorov
- Vasili Merkuryev
- Mykola Vinhranovsky
- Svetlana Zhgun
