= Le Lit =

- Directed by: Marion Hänsel
- Screenplay by: Marion Hänsel
- Based on: Le Lit by Dominique Rolin
- Produced by: Jean-Marc Henchoz
- Starring: Heinz Bennent; Natasha Parry; Johan Leysen
- Cinematography: Walther Vanden Ende
- Edited by: Susana Rossberg
- Music by: Serge Kochyne
- Release date: 1 January 1982
- Running time: 80 minutes
- Countries: Belgium; Switzerland
- Language: French

Le Lit is a 1982 drama film directed by Marion Hänsel and based on the 1960 novel of the same name by Dominique Rolin. The film starred Heinz Bennent, Natasha Parry, and Johan Leysen. Le Lit received the André Cavens Award for Best Film given by the Belgian Film Critics Association (UCC).

== Cast ==
- Heinz Bennent as Martin
- Natasha Parry as Eva
- Johan Leysen as Dr. Bruno Nanteuil
- Francine Blistin as Caroline
- Patrick Massieu as Tardif
- Marion Hänsel as Tilly
