= Poem of the Sea =

- Russian: Поэма о море
- Directed by: Yuliya Solntseva
- Written by: Aleksandr Dovzhenko
- Starring: Boris Livanov; Boris Andreyev; Mikhail Tsaryov; Mikhail Romanov; Zinaida Kirienko
- Cinematography: Gavriil Egiazarov
- Edited by: Aleksandra Kamagorova
- Music by: Gavriil Popov
- Production company: Mosfilm
- Release date: 1958
- Running time: 95 minutes
- Country: Soviet Union
- Language: Russian

Poem of the Sea (Russian: «Поэма о море») is a 1958 Soviet drama film directed by Yuliya Solntseva.

The film shows how a general returns to his childhood village, only to discover it will soon be submerged by a hydroelectric dam, prompting an emotional reunion of former residents to bid farewell to their fading homeland.

== Plot ==
Returning after many years to the places he holds dear, General Fedorchenko (Boris Livanov) reflects on his past, recalling the day he left his home village. Back then, both his mother and the collective farm chairman urged him to stay, but his youthful ambitions drew him elsewhere. Similarly, his former classmates were leaving for cities to pursue education and work, driven by dreams of a better future.

Fedorchenko’s journey home takes him through Nova Kakhovka, a vibrant, burgeoning city preparing for the launch of the Kakhovka Hydroelectric Power Plant. Upon arriving in his village, he learns that the construction of the power plant has drained the local collective farm of its workforce, as nearly all recent school graduates have joined the grand project. To his surprise, he also discovers that others, who left the village decades ago, are returning as well. Among them are notable figures such as an architect, a polar explorer, a pilot, a writer, a deputy minister, and six colonels. Initially, they struggle to recognize one another, but emotions run high as they reunite.

The gathering of these former villagers is no coincidence. On the village square, the collective farm chairman, Savva Zarudny (Boris Andreyev), announces somber news: the village, with its rich history, is living its final days. Located within the flood zone of the new reservoir, it will soon disappear beneath the waters when the station becomes operational. The whitewashed cottages, cherry orchards, club, school, and ancestral graves will be submerged, replaced by an artificial sea. Zarudny, determined to give the villagers one last chance to see their beloved home, sent out countless letters to summon those who once called this place home.

== Cast ==
- Boris Livanov as general Ignat Fyodorchenko (as B. Livanov)
- Boris Andreyev as Savva Zarudnyi (as B. Andreyev)
- Mikhail Tsaryov as Aristarkhov (as M. Tsaryov)
- Mikhail Romanov as Pisatel (as M. Romanov)
- Zinaida Kirienko as Katerina (as Z. Kiriyenko)
- Ivan Kozlovsky as Kobzar (as I. Kozlovskiy)
- Leonid Tarabarinov as Valeriy Golik (as L. Tarabarinov)
- Georgi Kovrov as Maksim Fyodorchenko (as G. Kovrov)
- Mariya Vital as Antonina
- Evgeniy Bondarenko as Ivan Kravchina (as Ye. Bondarenko)
