= The Sealed Soil =

1977 film by Marva Nabili

The Sealed Soil is a 1977 film by Marva Nabili.

The film traces the "passive revolt" of a young girl who refuses to marry, a transformation that can be seen as a metaphor for Iran's transition from tradition to modernity. She smuggled the original negative out of Iran and edited it at her university in New York. The film was shot without sound. Nabili later added dubbing and sound effects. The Sealed Soil met with international critical acclaim, notably winning an award at the London Film Festival in 1977. The film is the second feature film made by a female director in Iran. The film was never shown in Iran and was finally officially released in the United States in 2025.
