= Invisible Adversaries =

- DVD cover
- Directed by: Valie Export
- Written by: Valie Export; Peter Weibel
- Produced by: Valie Export
- Cinematography: Wolfgang Simon
- Edited by: Juno Sylva Englander; Valie Export
- Production company: Valie Export Filmproduktions GmbH
- Release date: 4 February 1977
- Running time: 104 Minutes
- Country: Austria
- Language: German

Invisible Adversaries (German: Unsichtbare Gegner) is a 1977 Austrian experimental drama film directed by Valie Export, her debut feature film.

== Plot ==
Set in contemporary Vienna, the film involves a photographer, Anna, who discovers that extraterrestrial beings are colonizing the minds of her fellow citizens by raising the human aggression quotient. The outer world immediately becomes disjointed, yet the inner world does too, as Anna and her lover, Peter, try to hang onto their deteriorating relationship.

== Cast ==
- Susanne Widl as Anna
- Peter Weibel as Peter
- Josef Plavec
- Monica Helfer-Friedrich
- Dominick Dusek
- Herbert Schmid
- Edward Neversal
- Helke Sander

== Release ==
The film was released on DVD by Facets Multi-Media in 2011 in a limited edition of 500 copies.

== Reception ==
Critical opinion regarding the film has been overwhelmingly positive. The Village Voice critic J. Hoberman, who in 1981 included the film in his list of the ten best films commercially released in the United States during that year, more recently wrote that the film is one "of the richest avant-garde features of the 1970s" and praised its "winning combination of sexual frankness and visual wit," while another critic, Dennis Schwartz, wrote that the "film's beauty is derived from its sexual frankness and playfully drawn out intimate relationship scenes, witty use of photography, and its originality as it breaks free of conventional unities of body, space and time. Export skillfully edits montage and integrates video, still photography, and performance art with elements from Cubism, Surrealism, Dada and avant-garde cinema." Artforum noted in November 1980 that "[w]atching their scenes together, we realize how seldom, if ever before, the details of sexual intimacy have been shown in film from the point of view from a woman. Export privileges rupture over unity and never settles for one-dimensional solutions" and it was called one "of the most original films in this year's exposition" and a "tour de force of cinematic invention" grounded in the director's "fresh and intelligent sensibility, characteristically self-referential. Her visual resources include mirrors, still photography, video, dance, and films within the film, all employed with a bold and surprising inventiveness" by the catalogue notes of the 1978 Los Angeles International Film Exposition. Similarly, critic Alison Butler wrote that the "film is a witty and visually brilliant essay on gender and experience, culture and environment" and program notes used by the San Francisco Cinematheque during a screening quote critic Amy Taubin as opining that the film "makes you reconsider what you and everyone else is doing – in life and in art" and critic Steve Anker underscoring that it is an important "crossover film" combining "avant-garde and theatrical sensibilities, made during the mid-1970s. It chronicles the nightmarish breakdown of a fashion photographer as she confronts her waning identity and security as a career woman; blending narrative experimentation, fantasy, fact and theoretical critique, it has enormous impact on independent features which followed it." PopMatters noted that the film has "enough originality to nag at patient viewers and get at least partially under our skin" and critic Michael Atkinson wrote that it is a "weird, restless, beguilingly offbeat bit of dreamwork." The film was presented for the first time at the Berlin International Film Festival in 1977, it has won a Special Jury Prize at the Venice Film Festival and was recently called "seminal" during a screening at a repertory cinema, "a strong and humoristic showdown" at another and "a sonically-complex, montage-rich, darkly funny and uriniferous cornerstone of avant-garde cinema" during a screening at a New York University class. Critic Peter Hajek wrote in the Austrian newspaper Kurier that "Valie Export presents this psychopanoptic view of the present in solid, striking images and often in unexpected humorous passages." Critic Chris Holmlund, author of the scholarly article "Feminist Makeovers: The Celluloid Surgery of Valie Export and Su Friedrich," referred to Invisible Adversaries as a feminist version of Invasion of the Body Snatchers, noted that the film includes references to famous paintings and to Un Chien Andalou, and wrote that therefore it "is visually rick, entertaining, striking, but also demanding." A few reviews, however, were negative. For example, London's Time Out wrote about the film that it is "[n]ot unlike W.R.: Mysteries of the Organism" and that it will "probably age as badly" and a reviewer for The Heights wrote that "I was expecting a great feminist work here, but got mediocrity. I cannot recommend that you see this film," though he nevertheless praised the film as a "cornucopia of video spectacle [in which] Export delights, confounds and amuses the audience with her antics."
