= Alison de Vere =

British animator (1927–2001)

Alison de Vere (16 September 1927 – 2 January 2001), while married also known as Alison Weschke, was a British animator, known for her animated short films The Black Dog and Psyche and Eros.

== Career ==
Born in Peshawar into a British military family, de Vere studied art in Brighton and at the Royal Academy.

She worked as a background designer at Halas and Batchelor studio beginning in 1951, at a time when women were unheard of in creative leadership roles in British animation. Nonetheless, she took the leadership of the animation unit of Guild Television Services in 1957. During the 1960s, she worked as a freelancer, but joined TVC in 1967 to work as design director on the Beatles film Yellow Submarine, in which she had a cameo.

The 1970s, when de Vere was an associate of the Wyatt Cattaneo commercials studio, were the beginning of her most productive period; the short films she made then "began her career of collecting prizes at every international festival at which her work was seen". In the 1980s and 90s, assisted by her son Ben, she created works for Channel 4, including her best-regarded works The Black Dog (1987, 19 min.) and Psyche and Eros (1994, 26 min.). She continued working on children's television series until the end of her life.

Other animated works include Cafe Bar and Mr. Pascal.

== Acclaim ==
The Guardian characterised de Vere as "not only the first woman auteur cartoon film-maker in Britain but also the best", thanks to her proficiency in animation technique and her design sense; and her film The Black Dog as representing "the same sort of advance in animation that The Marriage of Figaro was in opera".

De Vere's awards included the Grand Prix at the Annecy International Animated Film Festival (1979 for Mr. Pascal, ex æquo), and the first prize at the Odense International Film Festival (1989, for The Black Dog).

In 2015, de Vere was among leading women animators honoured by a short film opening the Annecy festival.

== Works ==
In addition to her previously mentioned works, de Vere worked as an animator for the TV series The Animals of Farthing Wood, East of the Moon and The Beatles, among others.

== Personal life ==
In 1948 de Vere married the painter Karl Weschke (1925–2005), whom she later divorced. The couple had a son, Ben de Vere Weschke.

== Bibliography ==
- Bendazzi, Giannalberto (2015). Animation: A World History. Vol. II. Taylor & Francis. pp. 156–157. ISBN 978-1-13885-481-9.
