= El Camino (1964 film) =

1964 film

- Directed by: Ana Mariscal
- Written by: Ana Mariscal; José Zamit
- Cinematography: Valentín Javier
- Edited by: Juan Pisón
- Music by: Gerardo Gombau
- Release date: 1964
- Running time: 95 minutes
- Country: Spain
- Language: Spanish

El Camino is a Spanish drama film directed by Ana Mariscal and released in 1964. Set in rural post-war Spain, with a screenplay by Mariscal and José Zamit, it is a film adaptation of the eponymous novel by Miguel Delibes published in 1950.

== Synopsis ==
The film is set in rural post-war Spain in Cantabria, specifically the village of Molledo (in the Iguña Valley). Daniel, nicknamed "the Owl," must leave his native village to go study in the city. His father, the village cheese maker, insists on a good education for his son so that he does not end up like him. In the days preceding his departure, Daniel and his friends create mischief in the village and observe the adult world around them. In an atmosphere stifled by the Christian morality imposed by the church and reinforced by the women of the village, Daniel prepares himself to leave.

== Cast ==
- José Antonio Mejías : Daniel 'The little owl'
- Maribel Martín : La Uca
- Ángel Díaz : Roque 'El Moñigo'
- Jesús Crespo : Germán 'El Tiñoso'
- Julia Caba Alba : Lola '
- Mary Delgado : Rita mother of Germán
- Mary Paz Pondal : La Mica
- Maruchi Fresno
- Joaquín Roa: The priest Don José
- Antonio Casas : Salvador father of Daniel
- Adriano Domínguez : Dimas
- José Orjas : Don Moisés
- María Isbert : Catalina 'La Leporida'
- Asunción Balaguer : Mother of Daniel
- Amparo Gómez Ramos : Sara
- Xan das Bolas : Father of Germán
- José Sepúlveda : The doctor
- Wilfredo Casado : Tomás, The older brother of Germán (Wifredo Casado)
- Juan Luis Galiardo : Mica's boyfriend (José Luis Galiardo)
- Manuel Ayuso : Manuel Ayuso Monje
- Félix Corella : Quino
- Agustín Zaragoza : Cuco
- Rafael Luis Calvo : The blacksmith
- Ana Mariscal : Narrator (not credited)
- Francisco René : Trino (non credited)
