= The Enchanted Desna =

- Directed by: Yuliya Solntseva
- Written by: Aleksandr Dovzhenko
- Starring: Boris Andreyev; Vladimir Goncharov
- Cinematography: Aleksei Temerin
- Edited by: V. Korovkina
- Music by: Gavriil Popov
- Production company: Studio Dovzhenko
- Release date: 1964
- Running time: 101 minutes
- Country: Soviet Union
- Language: Russian

The Enchanted Desna (Ukrainian: Зачарована Десна, romanized: Zacharovana Desna) is a 1964 Soviet fantasy drama film, directed by Yuliya Solntseva, based on an autobiographical story by a Ukrainian national writer and cinematographer Oleksandr Dovzhenko. The story depicts his whimsical childhood experiences in a Ukrainian village near the banks of river Desna.

The film won the Special Jury Prize at the San Sebastián International Film Festival.

A scene from the film was used on the cover of "That Joke Isn't Funny Anymore" by The Smiths.

== Cast ==
- Boris Andreyev
- Yevgeni Bondarenko
- Vladimir Goncharov
- Zinaida Kiriyenko
- Ivan Pereverzev
