= Marion Hänsel =

Belgian film director (1949–2020)

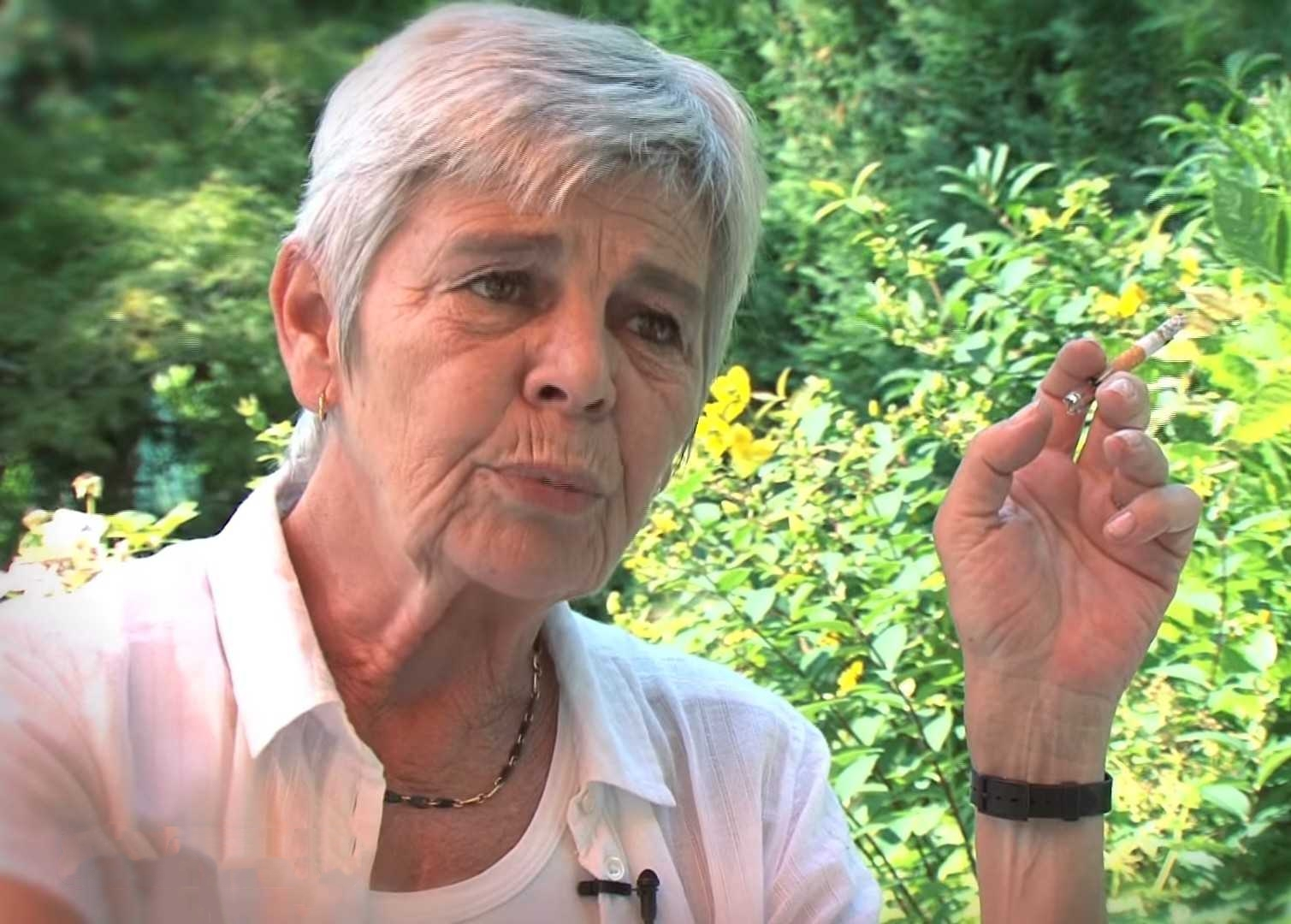
- Hänsel in 2016
- Born: Marion Ackermans; 12 February 1949; Marseille, Bouches-du-Rhône, France
- Died: 8 June 2020 (aged 71); Belgium
- Occupations: Film director, film producer, screenwriter, actress
- Years active: 1969–2020

Marion Hänsel (née Ackermans; 12 February 1949 – 8 June 2020) was a Belgian film director, producer, actress and screenwriter. Her film Between the Devil and the Deep Blue Sea was entered into the 1995 Cannes Film Festival.

Hänsel was posthumously awarded an Honorary Magritte Award at the 11th Magritte Awards.

== Selected filmography ==
- Palaver (1969)
- Le Lit (1982)
- Dust (1985)
- The Cruel Embrace (1987)
- Il Maestro (1990)
- Between Heaven and Earth (1992)
- Between the Devil and the Deep Blue Sea (1995)
- The Quarry (1998)
- Hell (2005)
- Sounds of Sand (2006)
- Noir océan (2010)
- La Tendresse (2013)
- En amont du fleuve (2016)
