= Lola Randl =

German film director and writer (born 1980)

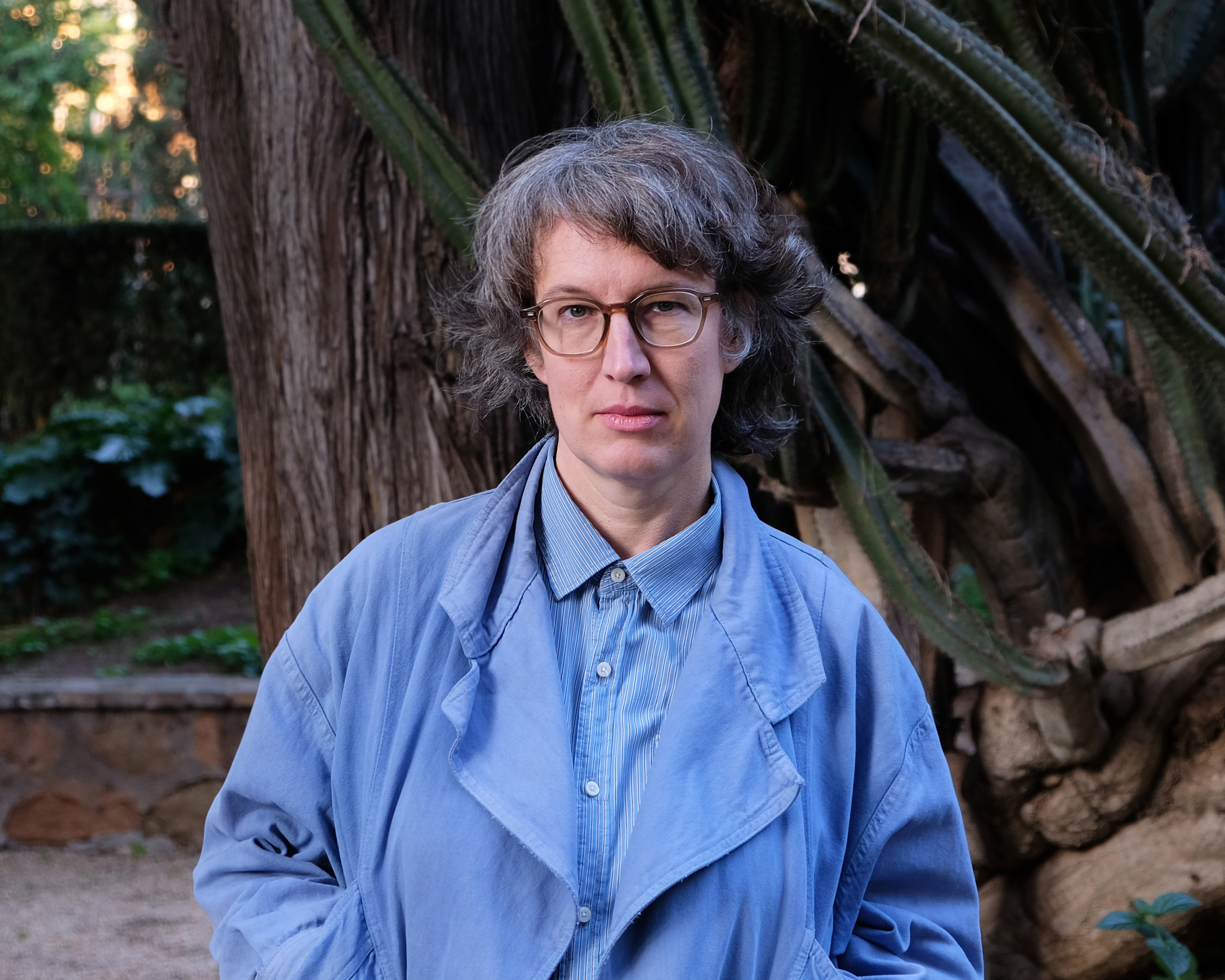
- Lola Randl (2024)
- Born: 1980 (age 45–46); Munich, West Germany
- Occupations: Film director, screenwriter, and writer
- Years active: 2001–present
- Partner: Philipp Pfeiffer
- Children: 2

Lola Randl (born 1980, Munich) is a German film director, screenwriter, and writer.

== Early life and education ==
Lola Randl was born in 1980 in Munich. She is the daughter of landscape architect Marie Randl-Entrup and composer Joe Mubare. She studied film directing at the Academy of Media Arts Cologne from 2001 to 2005/2006 and completed the Screenwriting Workshop at the University of Television and Film Munich (HFF) in 2007.

== Personal life ==
Lola Randl has a long-term professional and personal relationship with cinematographer and producer Philipp Pfeiffer, with whom she has two children. Pfeiffer has served as director of photography and producer on most of her films, including Die Libelle und das Nashorn (2012), Fühlen Sie sich manchmal ausgebrannt und leer? (2017), and Von Bienen und Blumen (2018).

== Career ==
=== Film ===
==== Early work ====
During her studies, Lola Randl directed several short films, including Geh aus mein Herz (2002), Verena Verona (2006), and Wohlfühlwochenende (2006). Her short film Nachmittagsprogramm (2004) won Best German Short Film at the Regensburg Short Film Week.

Between 2007 and 2010, she directed the short-film series Die Leiden des Herrn Karpf in collaboration with cinematographer Rainer Egger. The episode Der Geburtstag (2009) received the Prix UIP at the Berlin International Film Festival and was nominated for the European Film Award for Best Short Film.

==== Feature films ====
- Die Besucherin (2008) – premiered in the Perspektive Deutsches Kino section of the 58th Berlin International Film Festival.
- Die Libelle und das Nashorn (2012) – premiered at the Munich Film Festival.
- Die Erfindung der Liebe (2013) – production interrupted by the death of lead actress Maria Kwiatkowsky.
- Fühlen Sie sich manchmal ausgebrannt und leer? (2017) – premiered at the Munich Film Festival.
- Von Bienen und Blumen (2019) – premiered at the Munich Film Festival.

==== Documentary and television work ====
- Landschwärmer (2014–2015) – documentary series nominated for the Grimme Prize in 2016.
- Es ist aus – und jetzt? (2021) – podcast with author Anke Stelling for Deutschlandfunk Kultur.
- Theorie & Praxis (2022) – experimental documentary series on ARTE.
- In einem Dorf, das es nicht gibt (2022/23) – essayistic documentary.

=== Literature ===
- Der Große Garten (2019) – longlisted for the German Book Prize; Franz Tumler Audience Award.
- Die Krone der Schöpfung (2020)
- Angsttier (2025)
- Fourth novel (forthcoming 2026), Matthes & Seitz Berlin

=== Interdisciplinary practice ===
From 2008 to 2024, Randl operated Der Große Garten (The Great Garden) in Gerswalde, Brandenburg, a former castle nursery transformed into a cultural project. Developed in collaboration with her mother Marie Randl-Entrup, the site hosted workshops, readings, and exhibitions, becoming the subject of both her debut novel and documentary work of the same name.

== Awards and nominations ==
- 2004 – Best German Short Film, Regensburg Short Film Week
- 2009 – Prix UIP, Berlin International Film Festival
- 2009 – European Film Award, nomination (Short Film)
- 2016 – Grimme Prize nomination (Landschwärmer)
- 2019 – German Book Prize, longlist (Der Große Garten)
- 2019 – Franz Tumler Literature Prize (Audience Award)
- 2020 – Franz Hessel Prize for Contemporary Literature

== Residencies ==
- 2023 – Writer-in-Residence, MuseumsQuartier Vienna.
- 2024–2025 – German Academy Rome Villa Massimo.
