= Marva Nabili =

Iranian filmmaker (born 1941)

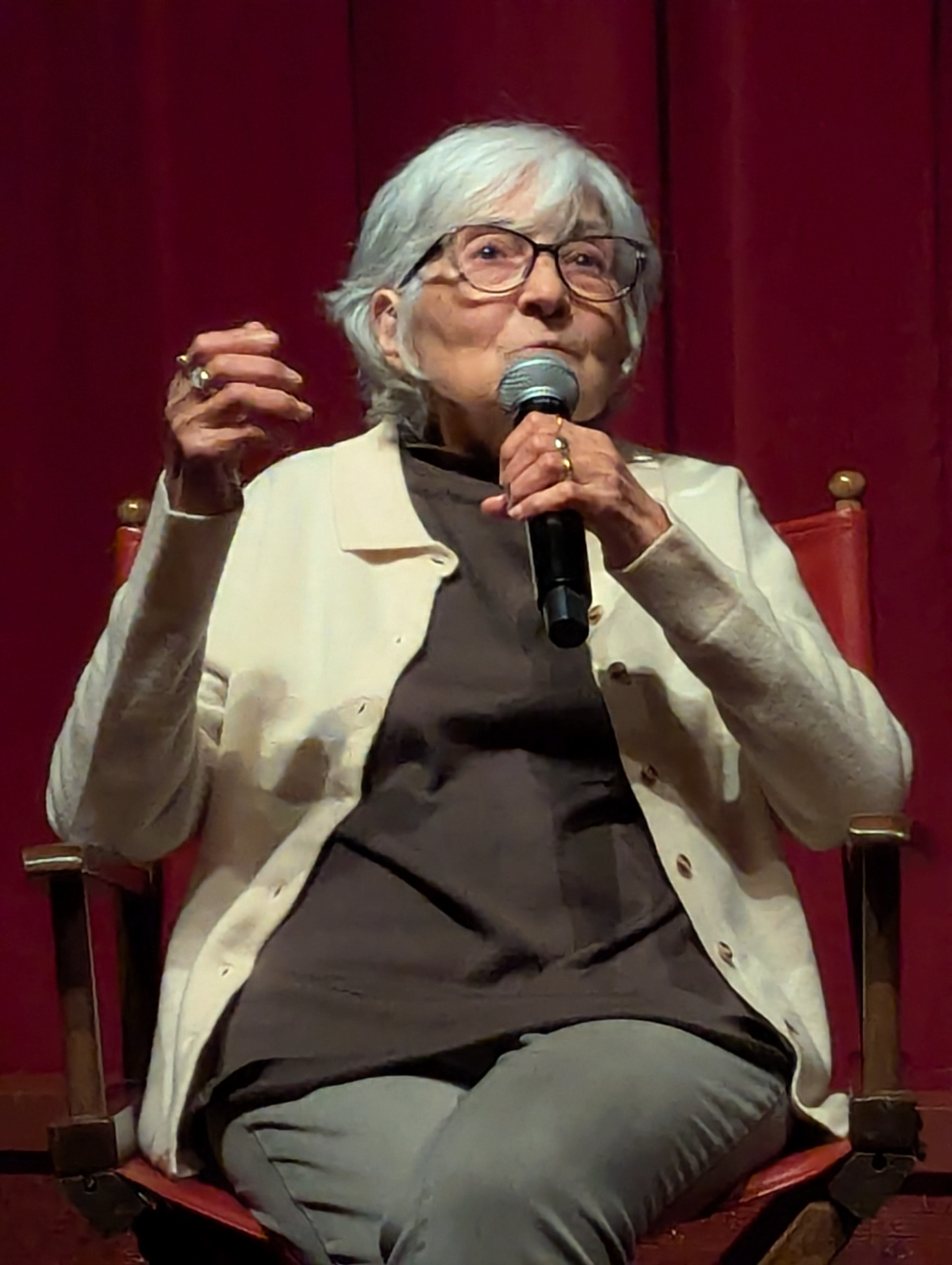
Nabili in 2024

Marva Nabili (born 1941) is an Iranian actress and director, known in particular for her first film made in Iran, The Sealed Soil.

== Early life and education ==
Nabili studied painting in the 1960s at the University of Tehran in Iran, and then film production at the City University of New York and Goddard College in Vermont in the 1970s. During her youth in Iran, Nabili was close to the Iranian New Wave, playing the lead role in the Fereydoun Rahnema film Siavash dar Takht-e Jamshid (Siavash in Persepolis).

== Career ==
Nabili returned to Iran in 1975 to shoot a film she had written about local folklore, Afsanehha-ye Kohan, commissioned by Iranian national television. This film primarily served as a pretext for shooting The Sealed Soil (Khak-e Sar Behmohr), which she did without authorization and with a non-professional crew. The film traces the "passive revolt" of a young girl who refuses to marry, a transformation that can be seen as a metaphor for Iran's transition from tradition to modernity. She smuggled the original negative out of Iran and edited it at her university in New York. The film was shot without sound. Nabili later added dubbing and sound effects. The Sealed Soil met with international critical acclaim, notably winning an award at the London Film Festival in 1977. The film is the second feature film made by a female director in Iran. The film was never shown in Iran and was finally officially released in the United States in 2025.

In 1984, Nabili shot her first film in the United States, Nightsongs, about the struggles of a Chinese family to integrate into New York and its Chinatown. The film was shot with a budget of $400,000, its production sparked controversy, with the Asian-American community and filmmakers criticizing it for depicting a community to which it did not belong. Nabili, who claimed to have spent more than two years in Chinatown to connect with the community, even working for four months in a sweatshop, partially modified her film following criticism, ultimately achieving widespread critical acclaim upon its release in 1983. In April 1985, it was aired on the series American Playhouse on PBS. In a review in The New York Times, John J. O'Connor described the film as a "haunting biography of outsiders trying to survive in a new environment."
