= Valie Export =

Austrian media artist (1940–2026)

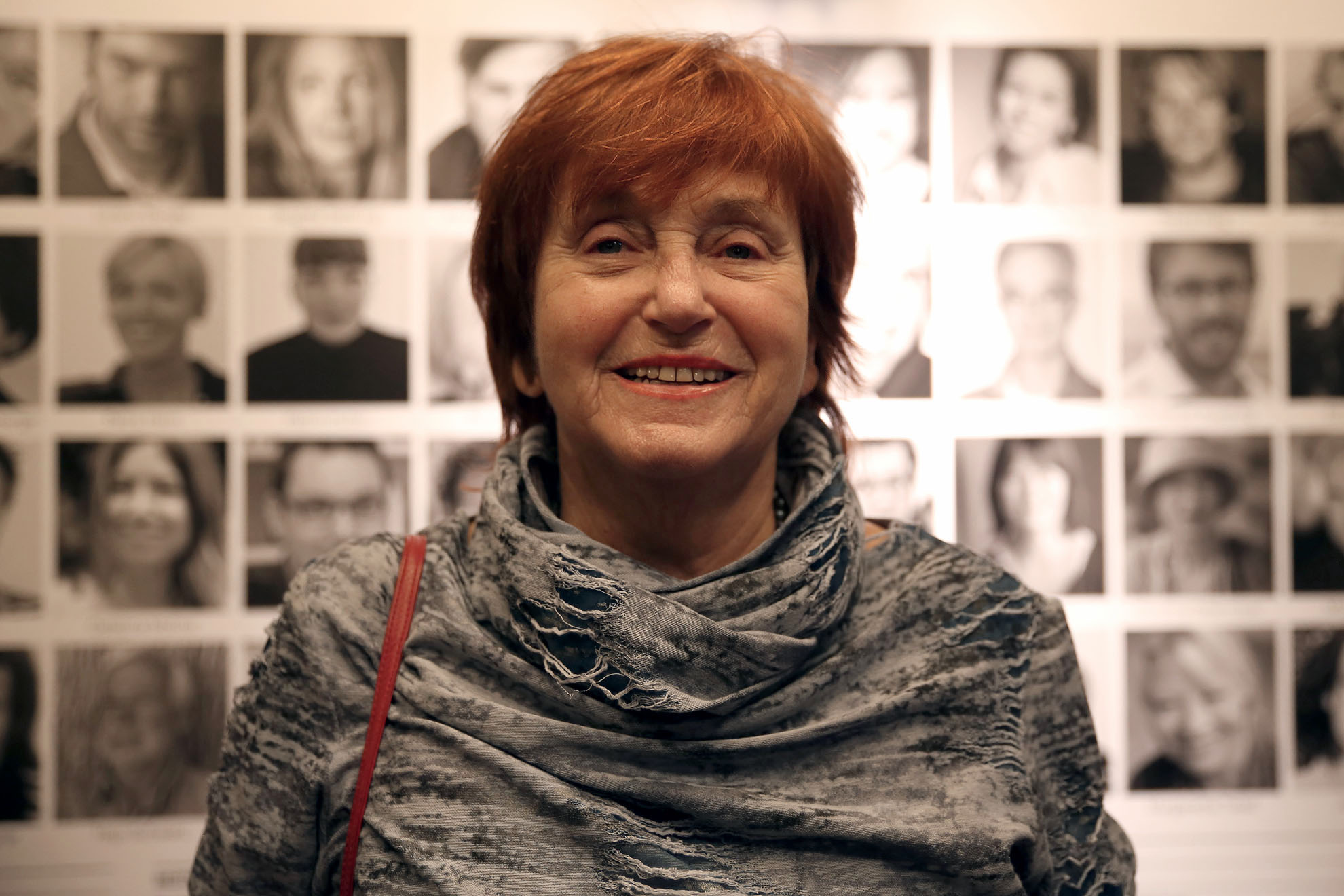
- Valie Export in 2013
- Born: Waltraud Lehner; 17 May 1940; Linz, Reichsgau Oberdonau, Germany
- Died: 14 May 2026 (aged 85); Vienna, Austria
- Known for: Artist
- Notable work: Cinema, photography, sculpture, computer animations
- Movement: Avant-garde, performance art, contemporary art
- Awards: Grand Gold Decoration for Services to the Republic of Austria
- Website: valieexport.at

Waltraud Lehner (17 May 1940 – 14 May 2026), known professionally as Valie Export (stylized in all caps; German: [ˈvaːli ˈɛkspɔrt]), was an Austrian avant-garde artist. She was best known for expanded cinema and provocative public performances. Her work also included video installations, computer animations, photography, sculpture, and publications on contemporary art.

== Early life ==
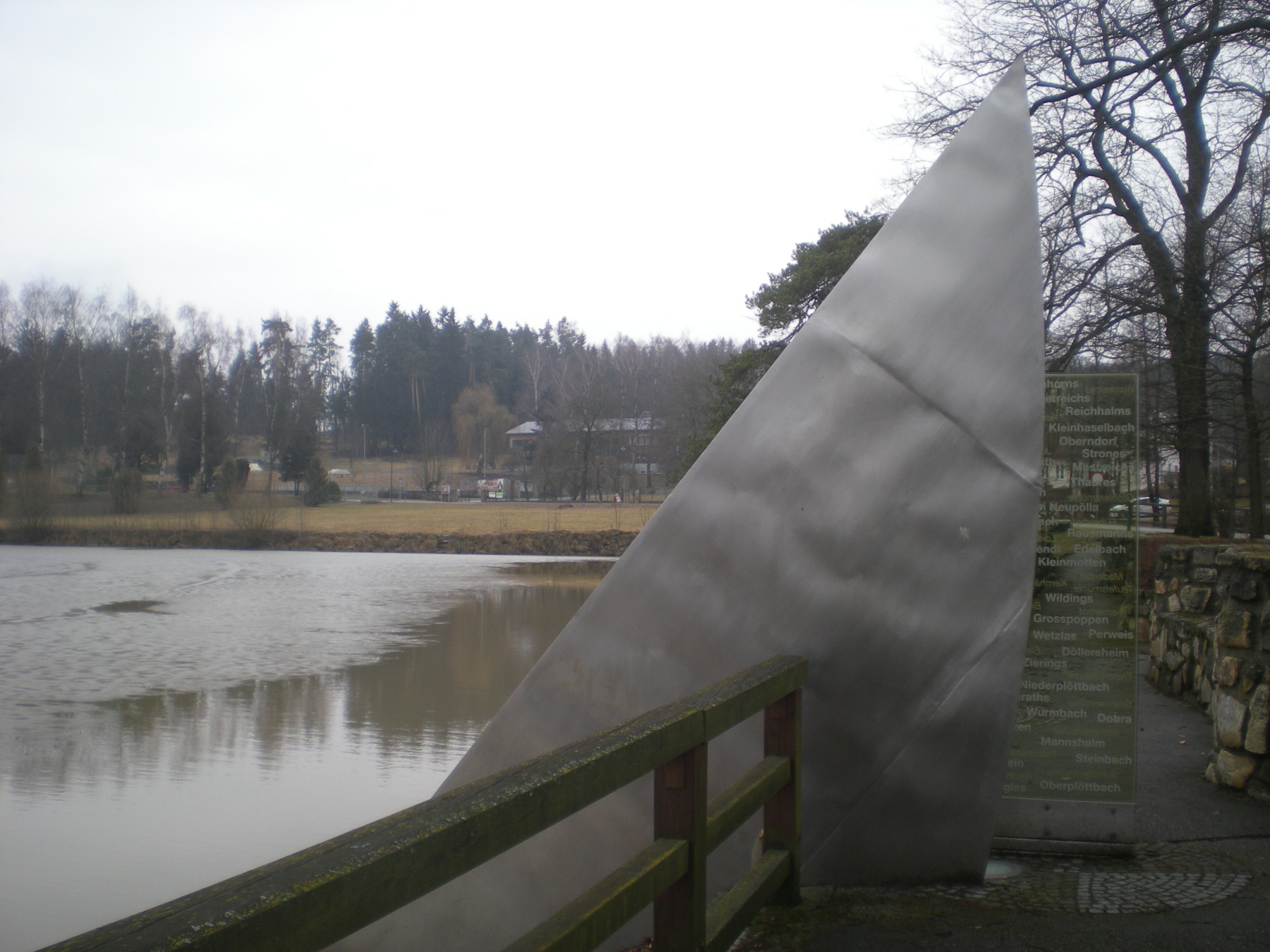
Sculpture Landschaftsmesser by Valie Export in Allentsteig, Austria

Valie Export was born Waltraud Lehner in Linz, Reichsgau Oberdonau, on 17 May 1940. She was raised there by a single mother of three. Export studied painting, drawing, and design at the National School for Textile Industry in Vienna.

== Career ==
=== 1960s and 1970s ===
In the late 1960s and early 1970s, Austrian feminism was forced to address the fact that by the 1970s there was still a generation of Austrians whose attitudes towards women were based on Nazi ideology. They also had to confront the guilt of their parents' (mothers') complacency within the Nazi regime. In 1967, she changed her name from Waltraud Hollinger to VALIE EXPORT, the name of a cigarette brand. Export explained her name-change:

I did not want to have the name of my father [Lehner] any longer, nor that of my former husband Hollinger. My idea was to export from my "outside" (heraus) and also export, from that port. The cigarette package was from a design and style that I could use, but it was not the inspiration.

With this gesture of self-determination, Export emphatically asserted her identity within the Viennese art scene, which was then dominated by the taboo-breaking performance art of the Vienna Actionists such as Hermann Nitsch, Günter Brus, Otto Mühl, and Rudolf Schwarzkogler. Of the Actionist movement, Export said, "I was very influenced, not so much by Actionism itself, but by the whole movement in the city. It was a really great movement. We had big scandals, sometimes against the politique; it helped me to bring out my ideas." Like her male contemporaries, she subjected her body to pain and danger in actions designed to confront the growing complacency and conformism of postwar Austrian culture. But her examination of the ways in which the power relations inherent in media representations inscribe women's bodies and consciousness distinguishes Export's project as unequivocally feminist. "In these performances and in my photo work of the 60s and 70s", Export said in a 1995 interview with Scott MacDonald, "I used a female body, generally my own, as a bearer of signs and symbols – individual, sexual, cultural – that could function within an artistic environment."

Export's early guerrilla performances have attained an iconic status in feminist art history. In her 1968 performance Aktionshose:Genitalpanik (Action Pants: Genital Panic), Export entered an art cinema in Munich, wearing crotchless pants, and walked around the audience with her exposed genitalia at face level. The associated photographs were taken in 1969 in Vienna, by photographer Peter Hassmann. The performance at the art cinema and the photographs in 1969 were both aimed toward provoking thought about the passive role of women in cinema and confrontation of the private nature of sexuality with the public venues of her performances. Apocryphal stories state that the Aktionshose:Genitalpanik performance occurred in a porn theater and included Export brandishing a machine gun and shooting at the audience, as depicted in the 1969 posters, however she claimed that this never occurred. In an interview in Ocula Magazine, the artist stated that: "The fear of the vulva is present in mythology, where it is depicted devouring man. I don't know if this fear has changed."

Her well-known performance piece Tapp-und-Tast-Kino (Tap and Touch Cinema) was performed in ten European cities, including Vienna and Munich, between 1968 and 1971. For this bodily public performance, Export wandered the streets of cities with a "small mock-up of a [movie] theater", first made of styrofoam and remade later in aluminum, strapped to her bare chest. Peter Weibel, her collaborator, invited passersby to "'visit the cinema' for five minutes" by reaching into the "theater" and feeling her bare breasts.

In Tap and Touch Cinema, Export inverts the sight-dependent functions of film and substitutes the "pleasure" of vision for physical touch. Instead of presenting a sexualized female body to be viewed, Export solicits physical contact. The "audience", actively participating in the performance, had direct, face-to-face contact with Export's body in the public sphere. The media responded to Export's provocative work with panic and fear, one newspaper comparing her to a witch. Export recalled, "There was a great campaign against me in Austria."

Some of her other works including Invisible Adversaries, Syntagma, and "Korpersplitter", show the artist's body in connection to historical buildings not only physically, but also symbolically. The body's attachment to the historical progression of gendered spaces and stereotyped roles represent Export's feminist and political approach to art.

In her 1970 photograph, "Body Sign Action", Export portrays a politically charged agenda through her performance artwork. The piece features a tattoo of a garter belt on Export's naked thigh. The garter is not attached at the top and only attached to a sliver of a stocking at the bottom- therefore suspended on the leg. Instead of the garter objectifying the body, the body objectifies the garter, flipping constructed societal roles in relation to the female body.

Export's groundbreaking video piece, Facing a Family (1971) was one of the first instances of television intervention and broadcasting video art. The video, originally broadcast on the Austrian television program Kontakte on 2 February 1971, shows a bourgeois Austrian family watching TV while eating dinner. When other middle-class families watched this program on TV, the television would be holding a mirror up to their experience and complicating the relationship between subject, spectator, and television.

She published "Women's Art: A Manifesto" in 1972. In it, she advocated for women to "speak so that they can find themselves, this is what I ask for in order to achieve a self-defined image of ourselves and thus a different view of the social function of women". Here Export points out the unjust way that women had been living their lives within the boundaries created by men. In this same manifesto, Export also wrote "the arts can be understood as a medium of our self-definition adding new values to the arts. These values, transmitted via the cultural sign-process, will alter reality towards an accommodation of female needs." This statement directly related her own work to the progress of empowering women.

Export's 1973 short film, Remote, Remote exemplifies the painful ramifications of the female body conforming to societal standards. In this piece she digs at her cuticles with a knife for twelve minutes, representing the damage societal beauty standards inflict on the female body.

Based on the precepts laid out in her 1972 manifesto, Export curated an exhibition of feminist art at the Galerie nächst St. Stephan in Vienna in 1975. Titled MAGNA. Feminism: Art and Creativity, this exhibition "introduced the feminist artist as curator and as contemporary art historian".

The year 1977 saw the release of her first feature film, Unsichtbare Gegner. For this film's script, she collaborated with her former partner, Peter Weibel. The film follows Anna, a young woman photographer, as she becomes increasingly convinced that the people around her are being taken over by the Hyksos, a hostile alien force. Her delusion, the film reveals, is caused by internalized behavioral expectations for herself as a woman that run counter to her true desires. However, Invisible Adversaries brought a lot of criticism towards her. In an interview she explained that some people actually thought she was cutting up a bird and a mouse where in reality she was not. She further explained that a man called Schtabel who writes on a column on a magazine released false information about her piece, even though she contacted him on various occasions. She then explained that after bringing a lawsuit against him he was forced to release the letters that were sent to him by Valie Export.

=== 1980s to 2020s ===
In her 1983 experimental film, Syntagma, Export attempted to reframe the female body by using a multitude of "different cinematic montage techniques—doubling the body through overlays, for example". The film follows Export's belief that the female body has, throughout history, been manipulated by men through the means of art and literature. In an interview with Interview magazine, Export discussed her movie, Syntagma, and said, "The female body has always been a construction."

Her 1985 film The Practice of Love was entered into the 35th Berlin International Film Festival.

From 1995 to 2005, Export held a professorship for multimedia performance at the Academy of Media Arts Cologne.

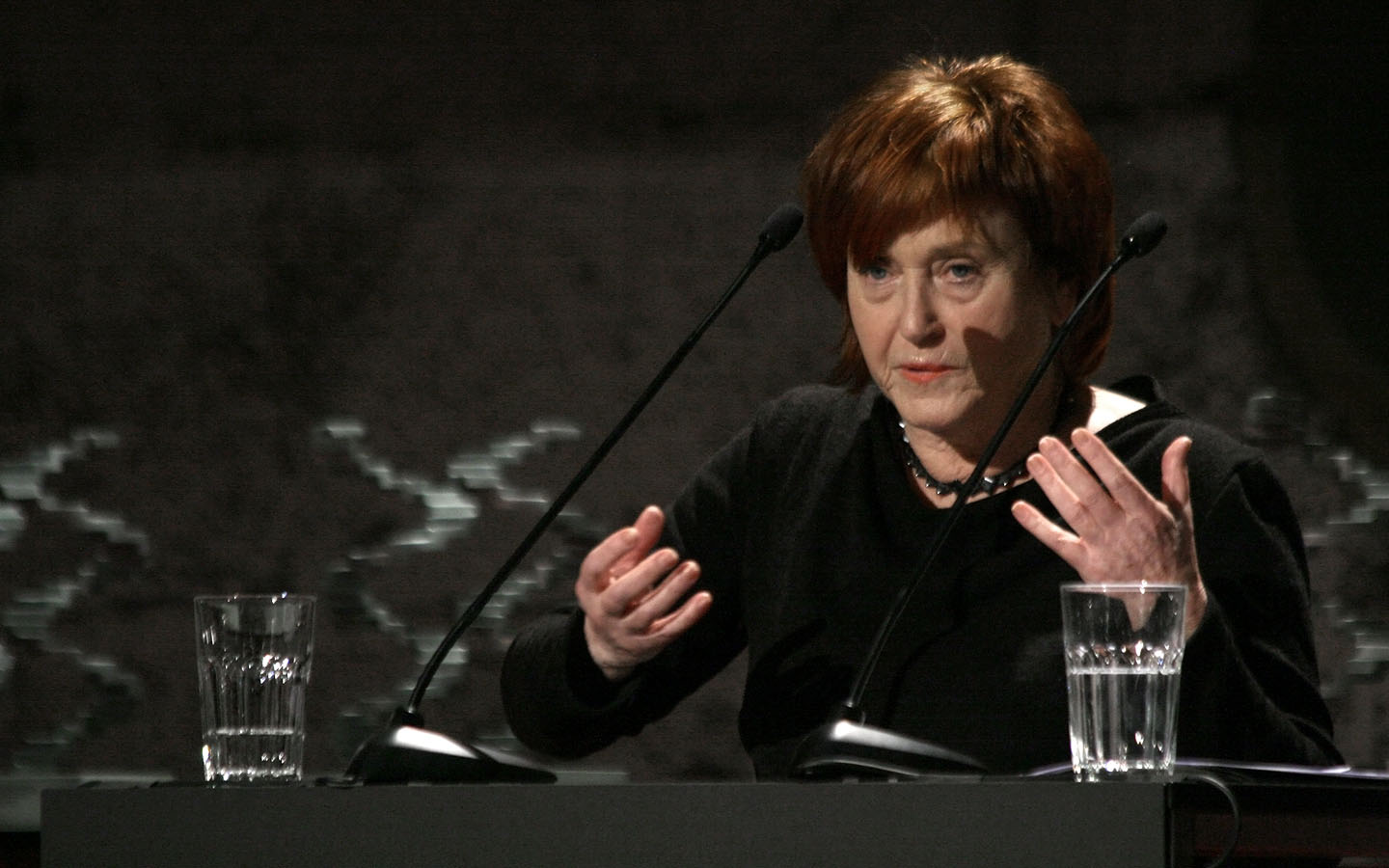
Export in 2012

In 2016, the city of Linz acquired her archive and opened a research center devoted to her work.

Bard College hosted an exhibition centered around Export's 1977 film Unsichtbare Gegner in 2016. The show featured work by Export as well as artists for whom Export's art "blew open doors: Lorna Simpson, K8 Hardy, Hito Steyerl, Trisha Donnelly and Emily Jacir, among others".

In 2019, Export won the Roswitha Haftmann Prize of £120,000, which is "Europe's largest single-award art prize".

== Russia's war against Ukraine ==
In February 2023, Export was among the 69 Erstunterzeichner*innen of the Manifest für Frieden, an online petition initiated by Sahra Wagenknecht and Alice Schwarzer calling on German Chancellor Olaf Scholz to halt further arms deliveries to Ukraine and seek a negotiated peace settlement. As early as March 2023, she stated that she would no longer sign the manifesto, because it had been and continued to be misused.

== Death ==
Export died in Vienna on 14 May 2026, three days before her 86th birthday.

== Works ==
=== Selected filmography ===
- Splitscreen – Solipsismus (1968)
- INTERRUPTED LINE (1971)
- ...Remote…Remote... (1973)
- Mann & Frau & Animal (1973)
- Adjungierte Dislokationen (1973)
- Invisible Adversaries (Unsichtbare Gegner, 1976)
- Menschenfrauen (1977)
- Syntagma (1983)
- The Practice of Love (Die Praxis der Liebe, 1984)
- Die Macht der Sprache (Power of Speech), 2002
- I turn over the pictures of my voice in my head (2008)

== Awards ==
- 1990: City of Vienna Prize for Visual Arts
- 1995: Sculpture Award at the Generali Foundation
- 1997: Gabriele Münter Prize
- 2000: Oskar Kokoschka Prize
- 2000: Alfred Kubin Prize Big Price culture of Upper Austria
- 2003: Gold Medal for services to the City of Vienna
- 2005: Austrian Decoration for Science and Art
- 2009: Honorary Doctorate of the University of Arts and Industrial Design Linz
- 2010: Grand Gold Decoration for Services to the Republic of Austria
- 2014: Courage Award for the Arts
- 2019: 19th Roswitha Haftmann Prize
- 2020: Golden Nica Visionary Pioneer of Feminist Media Art Prix Ars Electronica
- 2021: Honorary Fellowship of the Royal Photographic Society

== In popular culture ==
Her name appears in the lyrics of the Le Tigre song "Hot Topic".
