= Yuliya Solntseva =

Soviet actress (1901–1989)

- Юлия Солнцева
- Born: Yuliya Ippolitovna Peresvetova; 7 August 1901; Moscow, Russian Empire
- Died: 28 October 1989 (aged 88); Moscow, Russian SFSR, Soviet Union
- Occupations: Film director; actress
- Years active: 1924–1979
- Spouse: Aleksandr Dovzhenko

Yuliya Ippolitovna Solntseva (Russian: Юлия Ипполитовна Солнцева; née Peresvetova; (Note: Russian: Пересветова) 7 August 1901 – 28 October 1989) was a Soviet actress and film director. As an actress, she is known for starring in the silent sci-fi classic Aelita (1924). She is the first female winner of the Cannes Film Festival Award for Best Director in the 20th century and the first woman to win a directing prize at any of the major European film festivals, for the film Chronicle of Flaming Years (1961), a war drama about Soviet resistance to Nazi occupation in 1941.

== Biography ==
She was born on 7 August [O.S. 25 July] 1901 in Moscow into the family of Ippolit Peresvetov and Valentina Timokhina. Her mother worked as a senior cashier at the Muir and Maryliz Trading House (now TsUM). Yuliya and her brother were left without parents early in the care of their grandfather and grandmother.

After moving to St. Petersburg, where her grandfather was transferred, she studied at the gymnasium. Here she became interested in theater, played in an amateur studio.

She studied at the Faculty of History and Philology of Moscow University, but left her studies and entered acting courses at the State Institute of Musical Drama (now GITIS).

After graduating from the institute in 1922, she received an invitation to the Moscow Kamerny Theatre under the direction of Alexander Tairov, where her career began, but soon left the theater to work in cinema. In 1924, she played the title roles in two films: she played Aelita the Queen of Mars in the film of the same name by Yakov Protazanov and Zina Vesenina in the comedy The Cigarette Girl from Mosselprom by Yuri Zhelyabuzhsky. “In Yakov Protazanov’s Aelita, Solntsev’s debutante from the troupe of the Tairov Kamerny Theater smashed the futuristic geometry of Mars with uneven breathing towards a stray engineer from Earth”.

Since 1929, she worked as an assistant director at the studios of All-Ukrainian Photo Cinema Administration, the Moscow film factory Soyuzkino (later Mosfilm) and the Kiev film factory (later the Kiev film studio). Since 1939, she staged films as a director: at first, together with her husband Alexander Dovzhenko, after his death, on her own. Some of the films were based on unrealized screenplays of her husband.

In July 1941, the spouses were evacuated to Ufa, then to Ashgabat, where all the largest film studios, united in the Central Newsreel Studio, were brought. Solntseva acted as one of the directors of a documentary trilogy about the battle on the southern fronts. Since 1946 she worked at Mosfilm.

Solntseva directed 14 films between 1939 and 1979. She collaborated with husband Aleksandr Dovzhenko on his later films, including Michurin (1949), for which she was awarded a Stalin Prize.

After the death of her husband in 1956, Solntseva went on to produce three personal films he had made after Joseph Stalin's death in 1953. Dovzhenko died of a heart attack the night before he was to start the production for his first film, Poem of the Sea, of the three films he wrote but was unable to finish. Solntseva completed the works titling it The Ukrainian Trilogy, which focused on Ukrainian nationalism with a blend of illusion and reality. The trilogy was honored by the Museum of the Moving Image. The programme was named "Yuliya Solntseva's Ukrainian Trilogy" and screened on August 26–27, 2017.

Solntseva was not originally given credit for her own work as a director, instead seen as solely an assistant for Dovzhenko. With her cinematic work consisting of previously written material by her late husband, her own creativity had been overlooked with those believing her role in the production of The Ukrainian Trilogy was merely getting the film to the screen. Upon further consideration, it is now understood that Solntseva had incorporated her own artistic style with her own experimental sound design and images. She was able to discuss the conventions of socialist realism through the incorporation of melodramatic emphasis, as a way to bring these conventions into surreal worlds throughout the film.

For Chronicle of Flaming Years she won the Best Director Award at the 1961 Cannes Film Festival. She was also a jury member at the 1975 Cannes Film Festival. She was named a People's Artist of the USSR when she turned 80.

== Death ==
Solntseva died on October 28, 1989, in Moscow. She is buried at the Novodevichy Cemetery (plot No. 3) next to her husband.

== Personal life ==
Her husband was Alexander Dovzhenko (1894–1956), film director. They met in Odesa in 1928 and got married a year later.

== Selected filmography ==
As an actress

- Aelita (1924)
- The Cigarette Girl from Mosselprom (1924)
- Earth (1930, also assistant director)

As a director/filmmaker

- Ivan (1932, assistant director)
- Bukovina, zemlya Ukrainskaya (1939, documentary short)
- Shchors (1939, co-director)
- Osvobozhdeniye (1940, documentary)
- Ukraine in Flames (1943, documentary)
- Victory on the Right Bank Ukraine (1945, documentary)
- Yegor Bulychyov i drugiye (1953)
- Revizory ponevole (1955, short)
- Poem of the Sea (1958)
- Chronicle of Flaming Years (1961)
- The Enchanted Desna (1964)
- Nezabyvaemoe (1967)
- Zolotye vorota (1969)
- Takiye vysokiye gory (1974)
- Mir v tryokh izmereniyakh (1980)

== Honours and awards ==
- Stalin Prize, 2nd class (1949) – for the film Michurin (1948)
- All-Union Film Festival (1959) – A special honorary diploma film Poem of the Sea
- Cannes Film Festival (1961) – Award for Best Director for the film Chronicle of Flaming Years
- International Film Festival in London (1962) – Honorary diploma for the film Poem of the Sea
- San Sebastián International Film Festival (1965) – Special Diploma of the Jury "for the artistic and technical merits" of the film The Enchanted Desna
- Honored Artist of the RSFSR (1935)
- People's Artist of the RSFSR (1964)
- People's Artist of the USSR (1981)
- Order of Lenin
- Order of the Red Banner of Labour
- Order of the Badge of Honour (1950)

== Literature ==
- Nina Tolchenyova (1979). "Yuliya Solntseva". Мастера советского театра и кино [Masters of Soviet Theater and Cinema]. Moscow: Iskusstvo. pp. 120, 46.
