= Anne McCabe =

American film and television editor

- Born: California, U.S.
- Occupations: Director, editor
- Years active: 1988–present

Anne McCabe, ACE, is an American film and television editor. She is best known for her work on Boston Strangler, A Beautiful Day in the Neighborhood, Can You Ever Forgive Me?, Succession, The Newsroom: "We Just Decided To", Adventureland, You Can Count on Me and The Daytrippers.

== Life and career ==
McCabe was born in California, and raised in Boston. She graduated from the Commonwealth School in Boston and attended Barnard College, Columbia University. She is a member of the Academy of Motion Picture Arts and Sciences and the American Cinema Editors (ACE).

In 2022, McCabe directed her first documentary film, Idina Menzel: Which Way to the Stage?, which premiered on Disney+.

== Filmography ==
=== Film ===
Editor
| Year | Film | Director | Notes | Other notes |
|---|---|---|---|---|
| 1996 | The Daytrippers | Greg Mottola | | First collaboration with Greg Mottola |
| 1996 | I'm Not Rappaport | Herb Gardner | | |
| 1998 | Snapped | Jesse Feigelman | | |
| 1999 | Final Rinse | Robert D. Tucker | | |
| 1999 | Raw Nerve | Avi Nesher | | |
| 2000 | You Can Count on Me | Kenneth Lonergan | | First collaboration with Kenneth Lonergan |
| 2000 | Catalina Trust | Will Conroy | | |
| 2000 | Achilles' Love | Meridith Cole | | |
| 2001 | Peroxide Passion | Monty Diamond | | |
| 2004 | Maria Full of Grace | Joshua Marston | | |
| 2009 | Adventureland | Greg Mottola | | Second collaboration with Greg Mottola |
| 2009 | Labor Pains | Lara Shapiro | | |
| 2011 | The Ledge | Matthew Chapman | | |
| 2011 | Margaret | Kenneth Lonergan | | Second collaboration with Kenneth Lonergan |
| 2012 | Thanks for Sharing | Stuart Blumberg | | |
| 2014 | Top Five | Chris Rock | | |
| 2016 | Dirty Grandpa | Dan Mazer | | |
| 2018 | An Actor Prepares | Steve Clark | | |
| 2018 | Can You Ever Forgive Me? | Marielle Heller | | First collaboration with Marielle Heller |
| 2019 | A Beautiful Day in the Neighborhood | Marielle Heller | | Second collaboration with Marielle Heller |
| 2020 | What the Constitution Means to Me | Marielle Heller | Filmed live on stage | Third collaboration with Marielle Heller |
| 2021 | Land | Robin Wright | | |
| 2021 | Dear Evan Hansen | Stephen Chbosky | | First collaboration with Stephen Chbosky |
| 2023 | Boston Strangler | Matt Ruskin | | |
| 2024 | Nightbitch | Marielle Heller | | Fourth collaboration with Marielle Heller |
| 2025 | Nonnas | Stephen Chbosky | | Second collaboration with Stephen Chbosky |
| 2025 | Preparation for the Next Life | Bing Liu | | |
| 2027 | The Comebacker | Marielle Heller | | Fifth collaboration with Marielle Heller |

Editorial department
| Year | Film | Director | Role |
|---|---|---|---|
| 1988 | The Prince of Pennsylvania | Ron Nyswaner | Post-production assistant |
| 1989 | Casualties of War | Brian De Palma | Apprentice film editor |
| 1989 | Crimes and Misdemeanors | Woody Allen | Apprentice film editor |
| 1992 | The Mambo Kings | Arne Glimcher | Apprentice editor |
| 1992 | A Stranger Among Us | Sidney Lumet | Apprentice film editor |
| 1995 | Sabrina | Sydney Pollack | Assistant editor: New York dailies |
| 1996 | I'm Not Rappaport | Herb Gardner | Associate editor |
| 1998 | A Price Above Rubies | Boaz Yakin | Assistant editor: New York |
| 2005 | Bittersweet Place | Alexandra Brodsky | Supervising editor |
| 2010 | An Invisible Sign | Marilyn Agrelo | Additional editor |
| 2011 | Butter | Jim Field Smith | Additional editor |
| 2013 | The Inevitable Defeat of Mister & Pete | George Tillman Jr. | Additional editor |
| 2017 | Landline | Gillian Robespierre | Consulting editor |
| 2017 | Pottersville | Seth Henrickson | Supervising editor |
| 2026 | Miss You, Love You | Jim Rash | Additional editor |

Music department
| Year | Film | Director | Role | Notes |
|---|---|---|---|---|
| 1988 | Shakedown | James Glickenhaus | Apprentice music editor | Uncredited |
| 1993 | Life with Mikey | James Lapine | Assistant music editor | |
| 1993 | The Pelican Brief | Alan J. Pakula | Assistant music editor | |
| 1994 | Drop Squad | David C. Johnson | Assistant music editor | |
| 1994 | The Last Good Time | Bob Balaban | Assistant music editor | |
| 1999 | Raw Nerve | Avi Nesher | Music editor | |

Thanks
| Year | Film | Director | Role |
|---|---|---|---|
| 2005 | The Puffy Chair | Jay Duplass; Mark Duplass | Thanks |
| 2017 | Fits and Starts | Laura Terruso | Thanks |

Documentaries

Editorial department
| Year | Film | Director | Role |
|---|---|---|---|
| 1991 | Jimi Hendrix at the Isle of Wight | Murray Lerner | First assistant editor |
| 1995 | Message to Love | Murray Lerner | Assistant editor |

Shorts

Editor
| Year | Film | Director |
|---|---|---|
| 1995 | Little Women in Transit | Barbara Heller |

=== Television ===
TV documentaries

Editor
| Year | Film | Director |
|---|---|---|
| 2000 | Peter Jennings Reporting: Family Business | —N/a |
| 2005 | Peter Jennings Reporting: Breakdown - America's Health Insurance Crisis | —N/a |
| 2022 | Idina Menzel: Which Way to the Stage? | Herself |

Director
| Year | Film |
|---|---|
| 2022 | Idina Menzel: Which Way to the Stage? |

TV pilots

Editor
| Year | Film | Director |
|---|---|---|
| 2008 | Possible Side Effects | Tim Robbins |
| 2013 | Onion News Empire | Todd Strauss-Schulson |

TV series

Editor
| Year | Title | Notes |
|---|---|---|
| 2011 | Skins | 1 episode |
| 2011 | Damages | 3 episodes |
| 2010−11 | Nurse Jackie | 12 episodes |
| 2012 | The Newsroom | 1 episode |
| 2015−16 | Younger | 5 episodes |
| 2016 | BrainDead | 4 episodes |
| 2018 | The Purge | 1 episode |
| 2018−19 | Succession | 3 episodes |

Editorial department
| Year | Title | Role | Notes |
|---|---|---|---|
| 1993 | American Masters | Assistant editor | 1 episode |

TV specials

Editor
| Year | Film | Director |
|---|---|---|
| 2020 | Covid Is No Joke | —N/a |

== Awards and nominations ==
| Year | Result | Award | Category | Work | Ref. |
|---|---|---|---|---|---|
| 2025 | Nominated | Independent Spirit Awards | Best Editing | Nightbitch | |
| 2013 | Won | American Cinema Editors | Best Edited Drama Series | The Newsroom: "We Just Decided To" | |
| 2011 | Nominated | American Cinema Editors | Best Edited Half-Hour Series for Television | Nurse Jackie : "Years of Service" | |
