= Andamion Murataj =

Albanian film director, producer, and screen writer

- Born: Tirana, Albania
- Education: American University, 2002 MFA in Film and Electronic Media; Academy of Arts in Tirana, 1997 Directing
- Occupation(s): Film Director, Producer, Screenwriter
- Notable work: The Forgiveness of Blood
- Children: 1

Andamion Murataj is a film director, screenwriter and producer living in New York, NY. He is best known for the screenplay of the feature film The Forgiveness of Blood, that he co-wrote with Joshua Marston, and after which won the Silver Bear for the Best Screenplay at the 2011 Berlin International Film Festival.

== Biographical Information ==
With a background in painting and photography, Andamion Murataj's work spans over the years from writing and directing to cinematography and producing.

Upon his return to Albania, in 2010, he founded the Albanian Production Company "Lissus Media", that locally produced of the feature film “The Forgiveness of Blood”. In 2011 the film premiered in competition at the 61st Berlin International Film Festival.

Andamion Murataj is a founder and the director of Balkan Film Market, Albascript Workshops and often is a jury member in International Film Festivals.

Andamion Murataj holds an MFA in Film and Electronic Media from American University in Washington DC.

== Awards and Citations ==
- Silver Bear, Best Screenplay for The Forgiveness of Blood, (shared with Joshua Marston) 2010 Berlin Film Festival
- Silver Hugo, Best Screenplay for The Forgiveness of Blood, (shared with Joshua Marston) at Chicago International Film Festival.
- Best Pitch, Man of the House (2025 film) at Boat Meeting, International Film Festival Molodist. Kyiv, Ukraine,
