= Complete Unknown =

2016 drama film

- Theatrical release poster
- Directed by: Joshua Marston
- Written by: Joshua Marston; Julian Sheppard
- Produced by: Lucas Joaquin; Lars Kundsen; Jay Van Hoy
- Starring: Rachel Weisz; Michael Shannon; Danny Glover; Kathy Bates
- Cinematography: Christos Voudouris
- Edited by: Malcolm Jamieson
- Music by: Saunder Jurriaans and Danny Bensi
- Production companies: Parts and Labor; Heron Television; Great Point Media
- Distributed by: Amazon Studios; IFC Films
- Release dates: January 25, 2016 (Sundance Film Festival); August 26, 2016 (United States)
- Running time: 91 minutes
- Countries: United States; United Kingdom
- Language: English
- Box office: $212,857

Complete Unknown is a 2016 drama mystery thriller film, directed by Joshua Marston, from a screenplay by Marston and Julian Sheppard. It stars Rachel Weisz, Michael Shannon, Kathy Bates and Danny Glover. It had its world premiere at the Sundance Film Festival on January 25, 2016. The film was released on August 26, 2016, by Amazon Studios and IFC Films.

== Plot ==
A woman is shown living a variety of different lives under different aliases in different cities. In New York City, she manufactures a meeting with Clyde at a cafeteria and introduces herself as Alice, a biologist who specializes in studying frogs and who has recently returned from an extended project in Tasmania.

Clyde's friend and coworker Tom is preparing for a birthday party with his wife Ramina, an aspiring jewelry designer. Since Alice says she is looking to meet new friends, he takes her to the party. There she charms Ramina and the other guests with tales of her life and work in Tasmania. When Tom returns from the party he seems to recognize her and calls her "Jenny". Ramina announces that she has been accepted into a prestigious jewelry design fellowship in California, something Tom was not yet aware of. Over dinner, Alice tells of how she had impulsively decided to live in Mexico for a year, without informing her family. The admission causes some of the dinner guests to question her life choices. Later, Tom confronts Alice, who admits to being Jenny, an old college girlfriend who disappeared. She explains that she has spent the last fifteen years living under a string of assumed identities, abandoning them and moving on whenever she begins to feel trapped. She has come to New York to see Tom, someone who knows her from her old life.

The groups heads to a nightclub. Alice does a magic trick for Tom and explains that she learned it while working as a magician's assistant in China. The admission causes Clyde and the others to question her story and whether she lied about her background. Alice leaves the club and Tom follows her. They run into a woman named Nina who is walking her dog. When Nina sprains her ankle they help her back to her nearby apartment, with Alice claiming to be a pediatric cardiac surgeon. At the apartment which Nina shares with her husband Roger, Alice introduces Tom as Tony, an osteopath. At Roger's urging, Tom examines Nina. He begins to understand the thrill which Alice feels from pretending, but becomes uncomfortable and they leave.

Tom asks Alice if everything she says is a lie and she assures him that she really does work with animals. She takes him to Long Island to meet her coworker and see frogs hatching. Afterwards, Tom insists on accompanying her to her apartment as she prepares to leave and assume a new identity. Alice invites Tom to come with her, but he refuses. He returns to his apartment to discuss California with his wife.

In a public restroom, Alice dumps her credit cards, but keeps her driver's license, which she puts in a scrapbook containing all her old identities. She walks off into the crowd but then reappears in frame, wearing different clothes and a new identity.

== Cast ==
- Rachel Weisz as Alice Manning
- Michael Shannon as Tom
- Kathy Bates as Nina
- Danny Glover as Roger
- Condola Rashad as Sharon
- Chris Lowell as Brad
- Tessa Albertson as Tilda
- Kelly AuCoin as Dave
- Azita Ghanizada as Ramina
- Michael Chernus as Clyde
- Zach Appelman as Malcom
- Frank De Julio as Mark
- Omar Metwally as Farshad

== Production ==
In November 2014, it was revealed that Michael Shannon and Rachel Weisz had been cast in the film, with Joshua Marston directing from a screenplay he wrote with Julian Sheppard, with Lars Knudsen and Jay Van Hoy producing under their Parts & Labor banner, also marking Marston's first English language film. In February 2015, it was revealed that Kathy Bates and Danny Glover had joined the cast of the film, with Lucas Joaquin joining as a producer. Danny Besi and Saunder Jurianns composed the film's score.

== Release ==
The film had its world premiere at the Sundance Film Festival on January 25, 2016. Amazon Studios acquired U.S distribution rights to the film, and IFC Films became co-distributor. The film was released on August 26, 2016.

== Critical response ==
Complete Unknown received mixed reviews from film critics. It holds a 51% approval rating on review aggregator website Rotten Tomatoes, based on 76 reviews, with an average rating of 5.7/10. On Metacritic, the film holds a rating of 58 out of 100, based on 24 critics, indicating "mixed or average" reviews.

Guy Lodge of Variety wrote: "After a tantalizing pre-credit sequence teases the tumbling plethora of forms assumed by Rachel Weisz’s fascinating femme fatale, the compact puzzler that ensues scrutinizes only one of them, pitting her in an elegant but elusive dialogue with Michael Shannon’s bemused onlooker. A most surprising change of pace from Marston, following the international social realism of “Maria Full of Grace” and “The Forgiveness of Blood”, this Amazon Studios acquisition might find only a select audience, but could usher in a glossier phase of its helmer’s career." John DeFore of The Hollywood Reporter stated: "The viewer might have a hard time imagining an ending that will be both satisfying and truthful; it seems the filmmakers shared that dilemma. Sometimes, perhaps, walking off without goodbyes is the best solution."
