= News Night 2.0 =

- The Newsroom episode
- Episode no.: Season 1 Episode 2
- Directed by: Alex Graves
- Written by: Aaron Sorkin
- Original air date: July 1, 2012
- Running time: 55 minutes

Episode chronology
← Previous "We Just Decided To"	Next → "The 112th Congress"

"News Night 2.0" is the second episode of the first season of the HBO television series The Newsroom, which originally aired July 1, 2012. The episode was written by series creator and executive producer Aaron Sorkin and directed by Alex Graves.

== Plot ==
Mac (Emily Mortimer) asserts control over the new incarnation of News Night and enlists Sloan Sabbith (Olivia Munn), to do a nightly segment. Jim takes the fall for Maggie's mistake when doing the prep work for a report on SB 1070; The episode takes place on Friday, April 23, 2010.

== Reception ==
=== Ratings ===
In its original American broadcast, "News Night 2.0" was seen by an estimated 1.68 million household viewers, according to Nielsen Media Research.

=== Reviews ===
Scott Tobias of The A.V. Club graded the episode with a C, stating "News Night 2.0" is mostly Bad Sorkin, teeing up too many opportunities for soapboxing and idealist proclamations while missing the verve of professionals actually putting together a news story." Alan Sepinwall compared it to the pilot episode, stating "News Night 2.0" unfortunately magnified many of the problems I had with that first episode, while losing some of the elements (Mac being in complete command even in such an untenable situation, the staff coming together to do a kick-ass newscast) I had liked the most."
