= Raw Nerve (1999 film) =

- Directed by: Avi Nesher
- Written by: Noah Kaplan; S. Barnes
- Produced by: Avi Nesher; Kathy Jordan
- Starring: Mario Van Peebles; Nicolette Sheridan; Zach Galligan; Cheryl James
- Cinematography: Adam Santelli
- Edited by: Anne McCabe
- Music by: Chris Hajian
- Production companies: Spectator Films; Fortress Communications; Van Peebles Films
- Release date: 1999
- Running time: 105 minutes
- Country: United States
- Language: English

Raw Nerve is a 1999 American erotic crime drama film starring Mario Van Peebles, Nicollette Sheridan, Zach Galligan and Cheryl James. It was directed by Avi Nesher and written by Noah Kaplan and S. Barnes.

== Plot ==
A cop lures his girlfriend and a former partner into a world of corruption, robbery and murder.
