= Zbigniew Bzymek =

Polish-American filmmaker and video artist

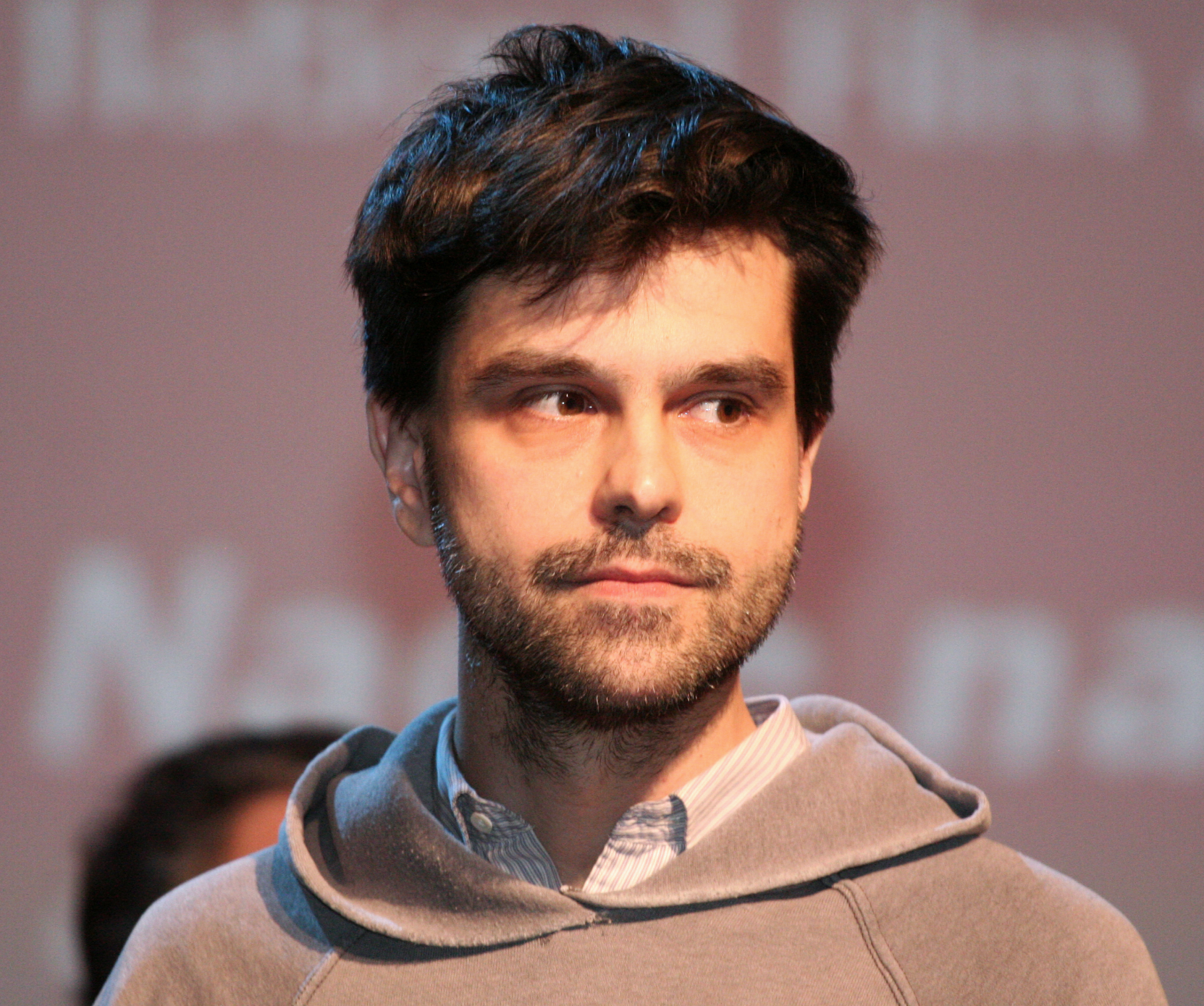
- in Poitiers 2008
- Born: January 21, 1976 (age 50); Warsaw, Poland
- Occupations: Filmmaker; Video Artist

Zbigniew Wojciech Bzymek (born January 21, 1976) is a Polish-American filmmaker, video artist, and theatre director. His feature film Utopians (2011) premiered at the Berlin International Film Festival, and his short Nagle na zawsze (2008) won the Grand Prix at the Rencontres Internationales Henri Langlois. He has collaborated extensively with Krystian Lupa and Elizabeth LeCompte of The Wooster Group, where he served as resident filmmaker and contributed to projects including the Dailies video series. In addition to film and theatre, he has directed music videos for leading artists such as Brodka and Mary Komasa, and published writing in BOMB Magazine and other outlets.

== Background ==
Bzymek was born in Warsaw to Danuta Jaworska-Bzymek, a plastic surgeon trained in Warsaw and at Yale who practiced in Poland and the United States, and Zbigniew Marian Bzymek (1935-2023), a professor of mechanical engineering at the University of Connecticut known for his early work in computer graphics, CAD/CAM systems, and artificial intelligence applications. Bzymek grew up in Sweden and Connecticut. He graduated *cum laude* from Bowdoin College with a BA in English and Russian, and later received an MFA in Film and Television Directing from the Polish National Film School in Łódź.

== Filmography ==
Year	Title	Role	Notes
2002	Bierność	Director	Short film
2002	In Hotel Syren	Director	Short film
2003	Taki Jak Ja	Director	Short film
2008	Nagle na zawsze	Director	Short film; Grand Prix, Henri Langlois Festival
2011	Utopians	Director	Feature; premiered at Berlinale FORUM
2013	Here Come the Girls	Cinematographer/Editor	premiered at Sundance; Directed by Young Jean Lee
2015	A Meaning Full Life	Cinematographer/Editor	premiered at BAM; Directed by Young Jean Lee
2015	Xenophilia	Director	premiere at Performing Garage
2021	The Story of Brut	Director	documentary about Brodka's album

== VR and performance media works ==
Year	Title / Project	Medium / Platform	Venue / Presentation	Role
2018	The Artist is (all but) Present	AR (Microsoft Hololens)	Makro Teatr Festival, PL	Writer / VR Dramaturg, directed by pl:Krzysztof Garbaczewski
2018	Dream Adoption Society Retro	AR/VR	The Performing Garage, New York, NY	Writer / VR Dramaturg directed by pl:Krzysztof Garbaczewski
2018	Ginsberg/Białoszewski	Multi-participant VR (Samsung Gear) performance	Dream Adoption Society at The Performing Garage, NY	Performer / Writer / VR Dramaturg directed by pl:Krzysztof Garbaczewski
2017	Courageous Hearts	VR (HTC Vive)	Genius Loci Fest, Kraków, PL; Wiesbaden Go East Festival, DE (2018)	Writer / VR Dramaturg directed by pl:Krzysztof Garbaczewski
2018	Pragmatists (or Use Me)	Live performance with VR, noise & vibration experiments	Hopkins Center for the Arts, Dartmouth College, NH; The Performing Garage, NY; Teatr Powszechny, Warsaw, PL (2019)	Director
2020	Ameryka(nie)	visual audio play	Teatrgaleria Studio Warsaw, Poland	Director
2023	Inter-Human / Inter-Form	Live performance (no VR)	Baryshnikov Arts Center, New York, NY	Director
2023	Deep Moon Pluto	Live performance by Küba Falk	Grace Exhibition Space, New York, NY	Video Designer

== Music videos ==
Year	Title	Artist	Role
2014	City of My Dreams	Mary Komasa	Director
2016	Horses	Brodka	Director
2019	Inni Ludzie	Ras, Sokół, DJ B	Editor
2022	Game Change	Brodka	Art Director VFX

== Concert tours ==
Year	Title	Artist	Role
2020	Romantic Psycho Live Tour	Quebonafide	Video Designer

== Video design in theatre and opera ==
Production	Director / Company	Role	Premiere / Years	Venue / Festival	References
Zaratustra	Krystian Lupa	Video design	2004	Athens Festival, Odeon of Herodes Atticus	
Solaris	Krystian Lupa	Video design	11 Feb 2005	Düsseldorfer Schauspielhaus	
Die Zauberflöte	Krystian Lupa	Video design	13 May 2006	Theater an der Wien	
Over All The Mountain Tops (Na szczytach panuje cisza)	Krystian Lupa	Video design	22 Sep 2006	Teatr Dramatyczny, Warsaw	
Abandon	Matthew Maguire	Video design	2006	La MaMa E.T.C.	
The Seagull	Krystian Lupa	Video design	2007	Alexandrinsky Theatre, Saint Petersburg	
Hamlet	The Wooster Group / Elizabeth LeCompte	Originated video elements	2006	Festival Grec	
Vieux Carré	The Wooster Group / Elizabeth LeCompte	Originated video design elements	c. 2010–2012	The Wooster Group productions	
La Didone	The Wooster Group / Elizabeth LeCompte	Video (with Joby Emmons, Andrew Schneider)	2008–2009	Kaaitheater; St. Ann’s Warehouse	
The Town Hall Affair	The Wooster Group / Elizabeth LeCompte	Video (Additional Video; Video DAILIES)	2012	The Wooster Group	
The B-Side: “Negro Folklore from Texas State Prisons”	The Wooster Group / Elizabeth LeCompte	Video / videography	2017	Touring / institutional venues	
A Pink Chair (In Place of a Fake Antique)	The Wooster Group / Elizabeth LeCompte	Additional video	2017–2018	Touring / Off-Broadway	
The Manuscript Found at Saragossa	Grzegorz Jarzyna	Video design	2025	Teatr Polski, Warsaw	

== Selected publications ==
- “Katarzyna Kozyra” — interview by Zbigniew Bzymek, *BOMB Magazine* (2021).
- “The Cancellation of ‘The Trial’” — commentary on Krystian Lupa, *BOMB Magazine* (2020).
- “The Factory and Its Double: Polish Iconoclast Krystian Lupa Does Andy Warhol On Stage” — essay in *Modern Painters* (2007).
- *Anon and I* — photo book by Zbigniew Bzymek, self-published in New York, distributed by Printed Matter (2010).
- Foreword to *Brulion: The Wooster Group Workbook* (Polish edition, 2012).

== Awards and nominations ==
- 2008 – Grand Prix (Jury Prize), 31 Rencontres Internationales Henri Langlois (Poitiers) — Nagle na zawsze
- 2008 – First Prize, Young Art Cinema Festival (Wrocław) — Nagle na zawsze
- 2008 – Second Prize, “Łodzią po Wiśle” Festival (Warsaw) — Nagle na zawsze
- 2011 – Teddy Award nomination, Berlin International Film Festival — Utopians
- 2011 – Official competition selection, Entrevues Belfort International Film Festival — Utopians
- 2011 – Official selection, CPH:PIX (Copenhagen) — Utopians
- 2011 – Official competition selection, New Horizons International Film Festival (Wrocław) — Utopians
- 2017 – Fryderyk Award, Best Alternative Album — Clashes (Brodka; lyrics co-writer)
- 2017 – Fryderyk Award nomination, Best Alternative Single — “Horses” (Brodka; lyrics co-writer)
- 2021 – Berlin Music Video Award, Best Art Direction — “Game Change” (Brodka; Art Director/VFX)
- 2022 – Fryderyk Award, Best Music Video — “Game Change” (Brodka; Art Director/VFX)

== Background ==
Bzymek was born in Warsaw, Poland and spent his early childhood with his family in Poland and later in Lund, Sweden. When he was eight years old, his family moved to Connecticut, after a two-year separation caused by Martial law in Poland. He lived with his family in Storrs, Connecticut, until he attended Bowdoin College in Brunswick, Maine, from which he graduated cum laude, with a major in English and a minor in Russian. He received a Master's Degree from the Polish National Film School in Łódź, Poland in 2008.

== Works ==
In 2001, he moved back to Poland to attend The National Film School in Łódź. While in Poland, he collaborated with Krystian Lupa creating original video projections and designs for seven major theatrical productions directed by Lupa. His dream sequence projections for Lupa's Zaratustra were shot on 35mm film and first projected on the stone back wall of the outdoor amphitheater Theatre of Herodes Atticus. Since 2006, Bzymek has been a member of The Wooster Group, a company of artists who make work for theater, dance, and media based in New York City. In 2008, Bzymek's diploma film Suddenly Forever (2008) received the grand prix du jury at Rencontres Internationales Henri Langlois (The Poitiers Film Festival) as well as two other Polish film prizes. Since 2010, Bzymek has been the main videographer and contributor to The Wooster Group's video journal The Dailies. In 2011, Bzymek finished his debut feature film Utopians, which premiered at The 61st Berlin International Film Festival. The Dailies led him to collaborate on two experimental documentary short films with playwright Young Jean Lee, the first of which, entitled Here Come The Girls, screened at Locarno International Film Festival and The Sundance Film Festival. In 2014, Bzymek directed the music video for debuting artist Mary Komasa's single City of My Dreams (Warner Music Poland) in New York City, bringing together the Berlin-based Polish expatriate artist with members of the NYC downtown dance community. In 2015, he collaborated with the Polish pop singer Brodka, on her album Clashes and directed the video for her single Horses (2016). In 2017, he received a Fryderyk nomination for best alternative single for his work as a lyricist with Brodka on Horses. The same year, Brodka's album "Clashes" won the Fryderyk for Best Alternative Album of the Year 2017, on which Bzymek co-wrote five songs. He has taught a course in previsualization at CUNY New York City College of Technology.

== Filmography ==
- Bierność (2002)
- In Hotel Syren (2002)
- Taki Jak Ja (Just Like Me) (2003)
- Nagle na zawsze (Suddenly Forever) (2008)
- Utopians (2011)
- Here Come The Girls (cinematography and editing) dir. Young Jean Lee (2013)
- A Meaning Full Life (cinematography) dir. Young Jean Lee (2015)
- Xenophilia (2015)

== Music videos ==
- Mary Komasa, City of My Dreams (2014 Warner Music Poland)
- Brodka, Horses (2016 PIAS)

== Video design in theatre and opera ==
- Zaratustra, dir. Krystian Lupa. Premiere 2004, Athens Festival, Odeon of Herodes Atticus.
- Solaris, dir. Krystian Lupa. Premiere 2005, Düsseldorfer Schauspielhaus.
- Die Zauberflöte, dir. Krystian Lupa. Premiere 2005, Theater an der Wien.
- Over All The Mountain Tops, dir. Krystian Lupa. Premiere 2006, Teatr Dramatyczny, Warsaw.
- The Seagull, dir. Krystian Lupa. Premiere 2007, Alexandrinsky Theatre, St. Petersburg, Russia.
- Oh What War, dir. Mallory Catlett. Premiere 2007, Here Art Center.
- Hamlet, The Wooster Group, dir. Elizabeth LeCompte - original video elements. Premiere 2006 at Festival Grec, Barcelona.
- La Didone, The Wooster Group, dir. Elizabeth LeCompte. Premiere 2008, Kaaitheater, Kunstenfestivaldesarts, Brussels.

== Awards and nominations ==
- Fryderyk Award Nomination, for best single Brodka's Horses 2017; Polish Association of Music Producers.
- Teddy Award Nomination, 61st Berlin International Film Festival.
- Gregory Millard Fellowship in Film, New York Foundation for the Arts, 2009.
- Grand Prix du jury for the film Nagle na zawsze (Suddenly Forever) (Soudain pour toujours); 31 Rencontres Henri Langlois, Poitiers, December 2008.
- 1st Place for the film Nagle na zawsze (Suddenly Forever); Young Cinema Art Festival Warsaw – 2008.
- 2nd Place for the film Nagle na zawsze (Suddenly Forever); 6th Annual „Łodzią po Wiśle” Warsaw, 2008.
