= Sleeping Sickness (film) =

2011 film

- Film poster
- Directed by: Ulrich Köhler
- Written by: Ulrich Köhler
- Starring: Pierre Bokma
- Cinematography: Patrick Orth
- Release dates: 12 February 2011 (Berlinale); 23 June 2014 (Germany)
- Running time: 91 minutes
- Country: Germany
- Languages: German; French

Sleeping Sickness (German: Schlafkrankheit) is a 2011 German drama film, directed by Ulrich Köhler. It premiered in competition at the 61st Berlin International Film Festival, where Köhler won the Silver Bear for Best Director.

== Plot ==
Ebbo Velten works in Cameroon in a sleeping sickness aid project living with his wife, Vera. Their daughter, Helen, usually attending a boarding school in Wetzlar, Germany, visits them. There are few patients although the European financial aid is generous. Velten's family move back to Europe but he stays.

Three years later, World Health Organization inspector Alex Nzila visits to assess the programme. Before he reaches the clinic there is friction with local people because he fears over-paying or being robbed. On arrival at the clinic Velten cannot be found. A woman in the clinic goes into an obstructed labour requiring a Caesarean section. Velten arrives just in time to perform the operation and deliver the baby. The baby girl is his, from his relationship with the mother. Soon the woman's relatives arrive to celebrate the birth. Velten brusquely refuses to give the woman's brother money when his 'father-in-law' asks him to help. This causes tension with the family.

Velten then takes the inspector to see sleeping sickness clinics; no cases have been reported. Velten takes the inspector to see a tourist venture. Later Velten, with an acquaintance and a guide, takes the inspector night-hunting with guns and spotlights. The acquaintance has an argument with Velten and leaves. Velten and the guide continue hunting while the inspector sleeps. He is woken by a gunshot; the guide returns without Velten, takes the inspector to the river and leaves. In the morning the guide returns in a dugout canoe to rescue the inspector. A hippopotamus emerges in a mysterious way from the jungle. Earlier in the film someone had emphasised how rare hippos were on that part of the river. Velten (″I have to believe in metamorphoses″) seems to be dead; however, the truth is left unspoken.

== Cast ==
- Pierre Bokma as Ebbo Velten
- Jean-Christophe Folly as Alex Nzila
- Hippolyte Girardot as Gaspard Signac
- Sava Lolov as Elia Todorov
- Maria Elise Miller as Helen Velten
- Francis Noukiatchom as Monese
- Ali Mvondo Roland as Ruhemba
- Jenny Schily as Vera Velten
- Isacar Yinkou as Joseph
