= I'm Not Rappaport (film) =

1996 comedy drama film by Herb Gardner

- Directed by: Herb Gardner
- Written by: Herb Gardner
- Based on: I'm Not Rappaport by Herb Gardner
- Produced by: John Penotti; David Sameth; John H. Starke
- Starring: Walter Matthau; Ossie Davis; Amy Irving; Craig T. Nelson; Martha Plimpton; Boyd Gaines
- Cinematography: Adam Holender
- Edited by: Anne McCabe; Emily Paine; Wendey Stanzler
- Music by: Gerry Mulligan
- Distributed by: Gramercy Pictures; Universal Pictures
- Release date: December 24, 1996
- Running time: 135 minutes
- Country: United States
- Language: English
- Box office: $298,532

I'm Not Rappaport is a 1996 American buddy comedy drama film written and directed by Herb Gardner, and starring Walter Matthau and Ossie Davis. Based on Gardner's play, the film focuses on two elderly New York City men—Nat Moyer, a cantankerous left-wing Jew, and Midge Carter, an African American man—who spend their days sitting on a bench in Central Park, trying to mask the realities of aging, mainly through the tall tales that Nat spins.

== Plot ==
In the park every morning, elderly, half-blind Midge Carter tries to read his newspaper but is distracted daily by Nat Moyer, an opinionated elderly man who reminisces about his old labor union, his socialist/communist activities, and the love of his life.

Midge is the superintendent of a residential building and has been trying to steer clear of tenant Pete Danforth, whose committee is pushing for Midge's retirement. Nat insists that Midge stand up for his rights, going as far as to present himself as Midge's attorney.

Nat's married daughter Clara is concerned about his welfare, particularly because of how vulnerable a senior citizen can be in Central Park. She has good reason to worry because Nat encounters the Cowboy, a drug dealer who is owed money by a young woman named Laurie, and by J.C., a mugger who turns violent when Nat unwisely decides to fight back.

== Cast ==
- Walter Matthau as Nat Moyer
- Ossie Davis as Midge Carter
- Amy Irving as Clara Gelber
- Craig T. Nelson as the Cowboy
- Martha Plimpton as Laurie Campbell
- Boyd Gaines as Pete Danforth
- Peter Friedman as Young Nat's Father
- Ron Rifkin as Feigenbaum
- Guillermo Diaz as J.C.

== Production ==
The film touches on several issues, including society's treatment of the aged, the difficulties of dealing with adult children who think that they know what is best for their parents, and the dangers that lurk in urban areas.

Its title is derived from an old vaudeville joke, a variation of which evolved into dialogue between the two protagonists.

== Reception ==
On the review aggregator website Rotten Tomatoes, 38% of 16 critics' reviews are positive, with an average rating of 6/10.

Roger Ebert of the Chicago Sun-Times gave the film 2½ stars out of 4, and felt that the film diverged too far from the play, writing, "If they'd stayed on the bench and just talked--talked for two solid hours--it might have been more successful. Instead, writer-director Herb Gardner loses faith in his original impulse and adds plot--way too much plot--to force the movie into more conventional channels."

USA Today critic Andy Seiler wrote, "Director Herb Gardner is a little too fond of writer Herb Gardner's script, which just keeps going and going and going -- until even two old pros such as Walter and Ossie have worn out their welcome."
