= 61st Berlin International Film Festival =

2011 film festival in Berlin, Germany

- Festival poster
- Opening film: True Grit
- Closing film: A Separation
- Location: Berlin, Germany
- Founded: 1951
- Awards: Golden Bear: A Separation
- Hosted by: Anke Engelke
- No. of films: 385 films
- Festival date: 10–20 February 2011
- Website: http://www.berlinale.de

Berlin International Film Festival chronology
- 62nd 60th

The 61st annual Berlin International Film Festival was held from 10 to 20 February 2011, with actress Isabella Rossellini as the president of the jury. The Coen Brothers film True Grit opened the festival. 300,000 tickets were sold in total during the event, to 20,000 attendees from 116 countries, including 3900 members of the press.

The Golden Bear was awarded to the Iranian film A Separation, directed by Asghar Farhadi, which also served as the closing film at the festival. German actor Armin Mueller-Stahl received the Honorary Golden Bear for lifetime achievement.

== Juries ==
=== Main Competition ===
The following people were announced as being on the jury for the festival:

- Isabella Rossellini, Italian actress - Jury President
- Jan Chapman, Australian producer
- Nina Hoss, German actress
- Aamir Khan, Indian actor, director, screenwriter and producer
- Guy Maddin, Canadian director and screenwriter
- Sandy Powell, British costume designer

In addition, the festival held a place open in the jury for the imprisoned Iranian director Jafar Panahi, "to signalize its support for his struggle for freedom".

=== Best First Feature Award ===
- Bettina Brokemper, German producer
- Assaf Gavron, Israeli writer and musician
- Michèle Ohayon, Morocco director, screenwriter and producer

=== Short Film Competition ===
- Nan Goldin, American photographer
- Ibrahim Letaief, Tunisian director, screenwriter and producer
- Renen Schorr, Israeli director, screenwriter and producer

== Official Sections ==
=== Main competition ===
The following films were selected to be in competition for the Golden Bear and Silver Bear awards:

English title	Original title	Director(s)	Production Country
Coriolanus		Ralph Fiennes	United Kingdom
Our Grand Despair	Bizim Büyük Çaresizliğimiz	Seyfi Teoman	Turkey, Germany, Netherlands
Tales of the Night	Les Contes de la nuit	Michel Ocelot	France
The Forgiveness of Blood		Joshua Marston	Albania, United States
The Future		Miranda July	Germany, United States
A Separation	جدایی نادر از سیمین	Asghar Farhadi	Iran
Lipstikka	אודם	Jonathan Sagall	Israel, United Kingdom
Margin Call		J.C. Chandor	United States
A Mysterious World	Un Mundo Misterioso	Rodrigo Moreno	Argentina, Germany, Uruguay
The Prize	El premio	Paula Markovitch	Mexico, France, Poland, Germany
Come Rain, Come Shine	사랑한다, 사랑하지 않는다	Lee Yoon-ki	South Korea
Sleeping Sickness	Schlafkrankheit	Ulrich Köhler	Germany, France, Netherlands
The Turin Horse	A Torinói Ló	Béla Tarr	Hungary, France, Germany, Switzerland
Innocent Saturday	В субботу	Aleksandr Mindadze	Russia, Germany, Ukraine
If Not Us, Who?	Wer wenn nicht wir	Andres Veiel	Germany
Yelling to the Sky		Victoria Mahoney	United States

=== Out of competition ===
The following films were screened out of competition at the festival:

English title	Original title	Director(s)	Country
Almanya	Almanya: Willkommen in Deutschland	Yasemin Şamdereli	Germany
Service Entrance	Les femmes du 6ème étage	Philippe Le Guay	France
My Best Enemy	Mein bester Feind	Wolfgang Murnberger	Austria, Luxembourg
Pina	—N/a	Wim Wenders	Germany, France
True Grit	—N/a	Joel and Ethan Coen	United States
Unknown	—N/a	Jaume Collet-Serra	Germany, United Kingdom, France

=== Panorama ===
The following films were screened in the Main Programme of the Panorama section:

English title	Original title	Director(s)	Country
The Unjust	부당거래	Ryoo Seung-wan	South Korea
Into the White Night	白夜行	Yoshihiro Fukagawa	Japan
Ashamed	창피해	Kim Soo-hyun	South Korea
Dance Town	—N/a	Jeon Kyu-hwan	South Korea
Top Floor Left Wing	Dernier étage gauche gauche	Angelo Cianci	France, Luxembourg
Seven Murders Forgiven	7 Khoon Maaf	Vishal Bhardwaj	India
Asshole	Gandu	Kaushik Mukherjee	India
Here	—N/a	Braden King	United States
Invisible	Lo Roim Alaich	Michal Aviad	Israel and Germany
Mothers	Majki	Milčo Mančevski	Macedonia, France and Bulgaria
Off Beat	—N/a	Jan Gassmann	Switzerland
Qualunquemente	—N/a	Giulio Manfredonia	Italy
Romeos	—N/a	Sabine Bernardi	Germany
Even the Rain	También la lluvia	Icíar Bollaín	Spain, France and Mexico
The Mortician	—N/a	Gareth Maxwell	United Kingdom and United States
Tomboy	—N/a	Céline Sciamma	France
Vampire	—N/a	Shunji Iwai	United States and Canada

=== Forum ===
The following films were screened in the Main Programme of the Forum section:

English title	Original title	Director(s)	Country
Absent	Ausente	Marco Berger	Argentina
Amnesty	—N/a	Bujar Alimani	Albania, Greece and France
An Angel in Doel	De Engel van Doel	Tom Fassaert	Netherlands and Belgium
The Ballad of Genesis and Lady Jaye	—N/a	Marie Losier	United States and France
Brownian Movement	—N/a	Nanouk Leopold	Netherlands, Germany and Belgium
Cheonggyecheon Medley: A Dream of Iron	청계천 메들리	Kelvin Kyung Kun Park	South Korea
Day Is Done	—N/a	Thomas Imbach	Switzerland
E-Love	—N/a	Anne Villacèque	France
Eighty Letters	Osmdesát dopisů	Václav Kadrnka	Czech Republic
Familiar Ground	En terrains connus	Stéphane Lafleur	Canada
FIT	—N/a	Hiromasa Hirosue	Japan
Follow Me	Folge mir	Johannes Hammel	Austria
Free Hands	Les mains libres	Brigitte Sy	France
Good Morning to the World!!	世界グッドモーニング!!	Satoru Hirohara	Japan
Heaven's Story	—N/a	Takahisa Zeze	Japan
Hi-So	—N/a	Aditya Assarat	Thailand
The House	Dom	Zuzana Liová	Slovakia and Czech Republic
Household X	家族X	Kōki Yoshida	Japan
Idleness	Ocio	Alejandro Lingenti and Juan Villegas	Argentina
Kabul Dream Factory	Traumfabrik Kabul	Sebastian Heidinger	Germany and Afghanistan
The Kite	Patang	Prashant Bhargava	India and United States
Late Autumn	만추 Man chu	Kim Tae-yong	South Korea, Hong Kong, China and United States
Looking for Simon	Auf der Suche	Jan Krüger	Germany and France
Made in Poland	—N/a	Przemysław Wojcieszek	Poland
Matchmaking Mayor	Nesvatbov	Erika Hníková	Czech Republic
The Residents	Os residentes	Tiago Mata Machado	Brazil
Self Referential Traverse: Zeitgeist and Engagement	자가당착: 시대 정신과 현실 참여; Jagadangchak: shidae-jeongshin-kwa hyeonshil-chamyeo	Kim Sun	South Korea
Silver Bullets/Art History	—N/a	Joe Swanberg	United States
State of Violence	—N/a	Khalo Matabane	South Africa and France
Submarine	—N/a	Richard Ayoade	United Kingdom
Swans	—N/a	Hugo Vieira da Silva	Germany and Portugal
Take Shelter	—N/a	Jeff Nichols	United States
—N/a	Territoire perdu	Pierre-Yves Vandeweerd	France and Belgium
The Terrorists	Poor kor karn rai	Thunska Pansittivorakul	Germany and Thailand
Under Control	Unter Kontrolle	Volker Sattel	Germany
Utopians	—N/a	Zbigniew Bzymek	United States
Viva Riva!	—N/a	Djo Tunda Wa Munga	Democratic Republic of Congo, France and Belgium
Ways of the Sea	Halaw	Sheron Dayoc	Philippines
The Young Butler	El mocito	Marcela Said and Jean de Certeau	Chile

=== Berlinale Shorts Films ===
The following films were selected to be in competition for the Golden Bear for Best Short Film:

English title	Original title	Director(s)	Country
15 July	15 iulie	Cristi Iftime	Romania
Silent River	Apele Tac	Anca Miruna Lazarescu	Germany and Romania
Ashley/Amber	—N/a	Rebecca R. Rojer	
The Unliving	Återfödelsen	Hugo Lilja	Sweden
Back by 6	—N/a	Peter Connelly	Belgium
The Calm	La Calma	Fernando Vílchez Rodríguez	Peru
Cleaning up the Studio	—N/a	Christian Jankowski	South Korea
The Shower	La Ducha	Maria José San Martín	Chile
Forest	Erdő	György Mór Kárpáti	Hungary
Questions to my Father	Fragen an meinen Vater	Konrad Mühe	Germany
Green Crayons	—N/a	Kazik Radwanski	Canada
Heavy Heads	—N/a	Helena Frank	Denmark
Night Fishing	파란만장	Park Chan-wook and Park Chan-kyong	South Korea
Arpeggio Ante Lucem	Pera Berbangê	Arin Inan Arslan	Turkey
Planet Z	—N/a	Momoko Seto	France
Broken Night	부서진 밤 Bu-seo-jin Bam	Yang Hyo-joo	South Korea
Doctor Rao	Rao Yi Sheng 饶医生	Alexej Tchernyi and Wu Zhi	Germany
Scenes from the Suburbs	—N/a	Spike Jonze	United States and Canada
Seven Days in the Woods	Sju dagar i skogen	Peter Larsson	Sweden
Stick Climbing	—N/a	Daniel Zimmermann	Austria and Switzerland
Terribly Happy	Sudsanan	Pimpaka Towira	Thailand
Susya	—N/a	Dani Rosenberg and Yoav Gross	Israel and Palestine
The Lost Town of Switez	Świteź	Kamil Polak	Poland, Switzerland, France, Canada and Denmark
Tomorrow Everything Will Be Alright	—N/a	Akram Zaatari	Lebanon and United Kingdom
Woman Waiting	—N/a	Antoine Bourges	Canada

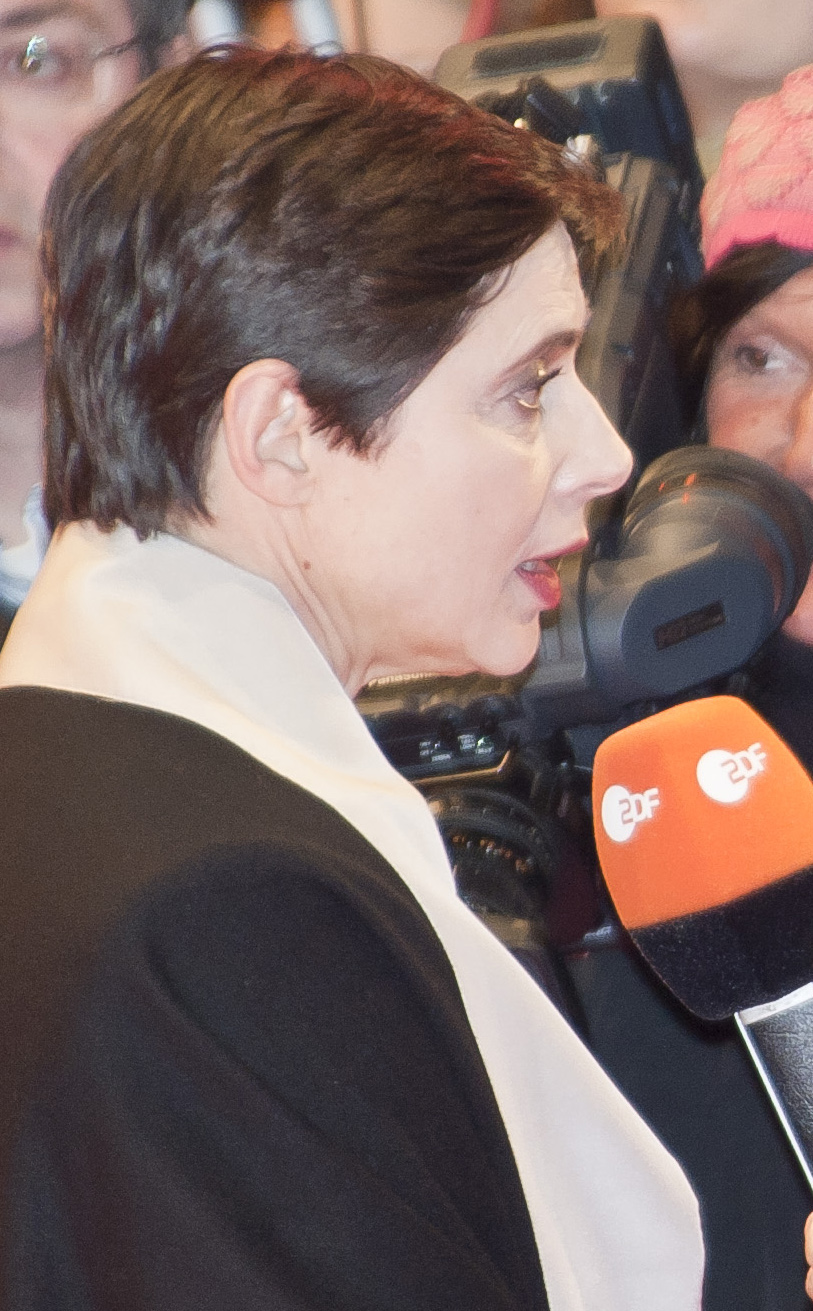
Isabella Rossellini, Jury President

== Official Awards ==
=== Main Competition ===
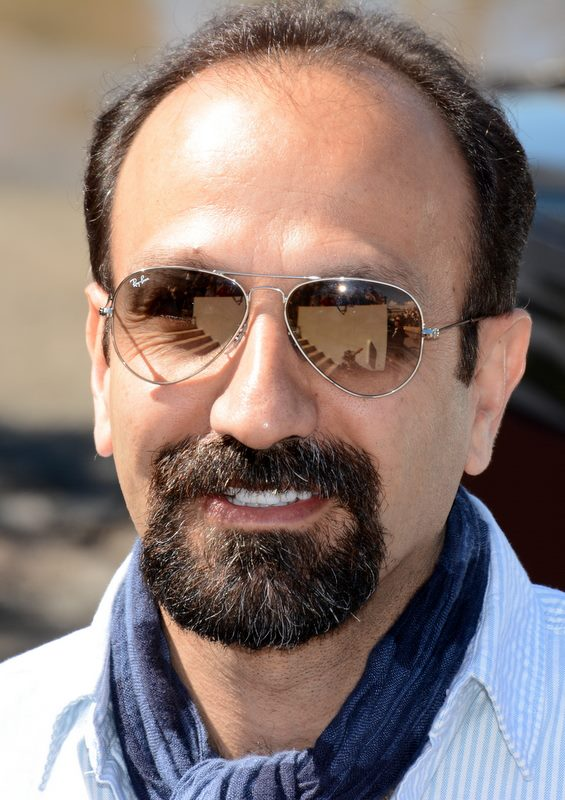
Asghar Farhadi, winner of the Golden Bear at the festival

The following prizes were awarded by the Jury:

- Golden Bear: A Separation by Asghar Farhadi
- Silver Bear Grand Jury Prize: The Turin Horse by Béla Tarr
- Silver Bear for Best Director: Ulrich Köhler for Sleeping Sickness
- Silver Bear for Best Actress: the actress ensemble of Nader and Simin, A Separation
- Silver Bear for Best Actor: the actor ensemble of Nader and Simin, A Separation
- Outstanding Artistic Contribution (Production Design): Barbara Enriquez for The Prize
- Outstanding Artistic Contribution (Camera): Wojciech Staroń for The Prize
- Silver Bear for Best Screenplay: Joshua Marston and Andamion Murataj for The Forgiveness of Blood
- Alfred Bauer Prize: If Not Us, Who? by Andres Veiel

=== Honorary Golden Bear ===
- Armin Mueller-Stahl

=== Crystal Bears ===
- Generation Kplus (Feature Length Film): The Liverpool Goalie by Arild Andresen
- Generation14plus (Feature Length Film): On the Ice by Andrew Okpeaha MacLean

=== FIPRESCI Prizes ===
- Competition: The Turin Horse by Béla Tarr
- Panorama: Top Floor Left Wing by Angelo Cianci
- Forum: Heaven's Story by Takahisa Zeze

=== Golden Bear for Best Short Film ===
- Night Fishing by Park Chan-wook and Park Chan-kyong
