= Bungalow (2002 film) =

2002 German military drama film

- DVD cover
- Directed by: Ulrich Köhler
- Written by: Henrike Goetz; Ulrich Köhler
- Produced by: Tobias Büchner; Peter Stockhaus
- Starring: Lennie Burmeister; Trine Dyrholm; Devid Striesow; Nicole Gläser
- Release date: 7 February 2002
- Running time: 85 minutes
- Country: Germany
- Languages: German, English, Danish

Bungalow is a 2002 German film directed by Ulrich Köhler and starring Lennie Burmeister, Trine Dyrholm, Devid Striesow, and Nicole Gläser. It achieved a rating of 40% on rotten tomatoes. It also a rating of 6.4/10 on IMDb.

== Plot ==
Paul is a German soldier who goes AWOL when the truck he is riding in stops at a fast food restaurant. He then returns home to where his older brother Max lives. Paul is immediately attracted to Max's girlfriend, Lene, and tries to entice her into a sexual relationship, but she refuses. Paul is shown to be angry and loses his temper at those around him, including his brother, his old friend, and his ex-girlfriend.

The military soon begins to look for him. After they arrive at his house, Paul runs to a nearby motel. Lene visits him, and they have sex in his motel room. Two military officers, along with Max, track him down at the motel, but Paul disappears.

== Background ==
The film was produced in June/July 2001 in Gladenbach and Bad Endbach in Hesse.

== Cast ==
- Lennie Burmeister as Paul
- Trine Dyrholm as Lene
- Devid Striesow as Max
- Nicole Gläser as Kerstin
