= Ulrich Köhler (director) =

- Born: 15 December 1969 (age 56); Marburg, West Germany
- Occupations: Film director, screenwriter
- Years active: 1990s–present

Ulrich Köhler (born 15 December 1969) is a German film director and screenwriter associated with the Berlin School of filmmaking. He is best known for his films Sleeping Sickness (2011), which won the Silver Bear for Best Director at the Berlin International Film Festival , and In My Room (2018), which premiered in the Un Certain Regard section at the Cannes Film Festival. In an interview with the German newspaper taz, Köhler reflected on his childhood in Africa and the autobiographical elements of Sleeping Sickness.

== Early life and education ==
Köhler was born in Marburg, Hesse. From the age of five to nine he lived in Zaire (now the Democratic Republic of the Congo), where his parents worked as development aid workers. He studied art in Quimper, France (1989–1991), then philosophy and visual communication at the Hochschule für bildende Künste Hamburg, graduating in 1998.

== Style and themes ==
Köhler is considered part of the Berlin School, a loose movement of German filmmakers including Christian Petzold and Angela Schanelec. His films often explore alienation, identity, and social dislocation, with minimalist style and long takes. In 2019, the British film magazine Sight & Sound described Köhler’s work as “slow-burn dramas of dislocation” and situated him within the Berlin School.

== Selected filmography ==
- Bungalow (2002)
- Windows on Monday (2006)
- Sleeping Sickness (2011)
- In My Room (2018)
- Das freiwillige Jahr (2019)

== Awards ==
- Silver Bear for Best Director, Berlin International Film Festival (2011) – Sleeping Sickness
