= The Forgiveness of Blood =

2011 film

- Theatrical release poster
- Directed by: Joshua Marston
- Written by: Joshua Marston; Andamion Murataj
- Starring: Tristan Halilaj
- Cinematography: Rob Hardy
- Edited by: Malcolm Jamieson
- Release dates: 18 February 2011 (Berlinale); 17 September 2011 (Albania)
- Running time: 109 minutes
- Countries: United States; Albania
- Language: Albanian

The Forgiveness of Blood (Albanian: Falja e Gjakut) is a 2011 drama film co-written and directed by Joshua Marston. The film premiered in competition at the 61st Berlin International Film Festival and competed for the Golden Bear. Marston and co-writer Andamion Murataj won the Silver Bear for Best Script.

The film was originally submitted as the Albanian entry for the Best Foreign Language Film, but it was rejected when Bujar Alimani, director of Amnesty, protested that The Forgiveness of Blood ought not to be eligible due to American input on the project. The AMPAS disqualified it and Albania submitted Alimani's film instead.

The film deals with the consequences of a blood feud on a family in a remote area of modern-day Albania.

== Cast ==
- Refet Abazi as Mark, who incites a blood feud by killing his neighbour Sokol.
- Veton Osmani as Sokol, the neighbour Mark kills in a dispute over a field.
- Tristan Halilaj as Nik, Mark's 17-year-old son.
- Sindi Lacej as Rudina, Mark's 14-year-old daughter.
- Erjon Mani as Tom, 17-year-old friend of Nik.

== Plot ==
After their father and uncle are suspected of murdering a neighbor because of a land dispute, the lives of the children are changed. Nik, the teenage son, is confined to the house, while Rudina, the oldest girl, is forced to quit high school and take over the family's bread delivery business. The film contrasts the modernization of rural Albania, where the teenagers text each other and Nik dreams of opening an internet cafe, with centuries-old customs.

== Reception ==
The film earned an 84% rating at Rotten Tomatoes, with an average rating of 7.22/10 based on 69 reviews.

== Cultural background ==
The Kanun is a traditional code of behavior that is followed rarely today in Albania, most notably in the northern highlands in deep mountains when people are stuck in the past traditions, which authorizes an eye-for-an-eye response in event of murder. According to the Kanun, the family of a murdered person should kill a member of the murderer's family. Although traditionally only adult men are at risk, there have been instances where women or children have been killed. The revenge killing can only take place outside of the person's home, so at-risk men are often confined to home while women become the sole support of the family.

== Awards ==
- Silver Bear for Best Screenplay, Berlin International Film Festival 2011
- Silver Hugo for Best Screenplay, Chicago International Film Festival 2011
- Special Jury Prize, Hamptons International Film Festival 2011
