= The Newsroom (American TV series) =

American political drama television series (2012–2014)

- Genre: Political drama
- Created by: Aaron Sorkin
- Written by: Aaron Sorkin
- Starring: Jeff Daniels; Emily Mortimer; John Gallagher Jr.; Alison Pill; Thomas Sadoski; Dev Patel; Olivia Munn; Sam Waterston
- Theme music composer: Thomas Newman
- Composers: Alex Wurman; Johnny Klimek; Jeff Beal
- Country of origin: United States
- Original language: English
- No. of seasons: 3
- No. of episodes: 25

Production
- Executive producers: Aaron Sorkin; Scott Rudin; Alan Poul; Paul Lieberstein; Denis Biggs
- Production locations: Los Angeles; New York City
- Cinematography: Todd McMullen
- Running time: 52–64 minutes; 73 minutes (pilot)
- Production company: HBO Entertainment

Original release
- Network: HBO
- Release: June 24, 2012 – December 14, 2014

The Newsroom is an American political drama television series created and principally written by Aaron Sorkin that premiered on HBO on June 24, 2012, and concluded on December 14, 2014, consisting of 25 episodes over three seasons.

The series chronicles behind-the-scenes events at the fictional Atlantis Cable News (ACN) channel. It features an ensemble cast including Jeff Daniels as anchor Will McAvoy who, together with his staff, sets out to put on a news show "in the face of corporate and commercial obstacles and their own personal entanglements". Other cast members include Emily Mortimer, John Gallagher Jr., Alison Pill, Thomas Sadoski, Dev Patel, Olivia Munn, and Sam Waterston.

Sorkin, who created the Emmy Award-winning political drama The West Wing, had reportedly been developing a cable-news-centered TV drama since 2009. After months of negotiations, premium cable network HBO ordered a pilot in January 2011 and then a full series in September that year. Sorkin did his research for the series by observing several real-world cable news programs first-hand. He served as executive producer, along with Scott Rudin and Alan Poul.

== Series overview ==
The 25-episode series is set behind the scenes at the fictional Atlantis Cable News (ACN) and revolves around anchor Will McAvoy, his new executive producer MacKenzie McHale, newsroom staff Jim Harper, Maggie Jordan, Sloan Sabbith, Neal Sampat, Don Keefer, and the head of ACN, Charlie Skinner.

== Cast and characters ==
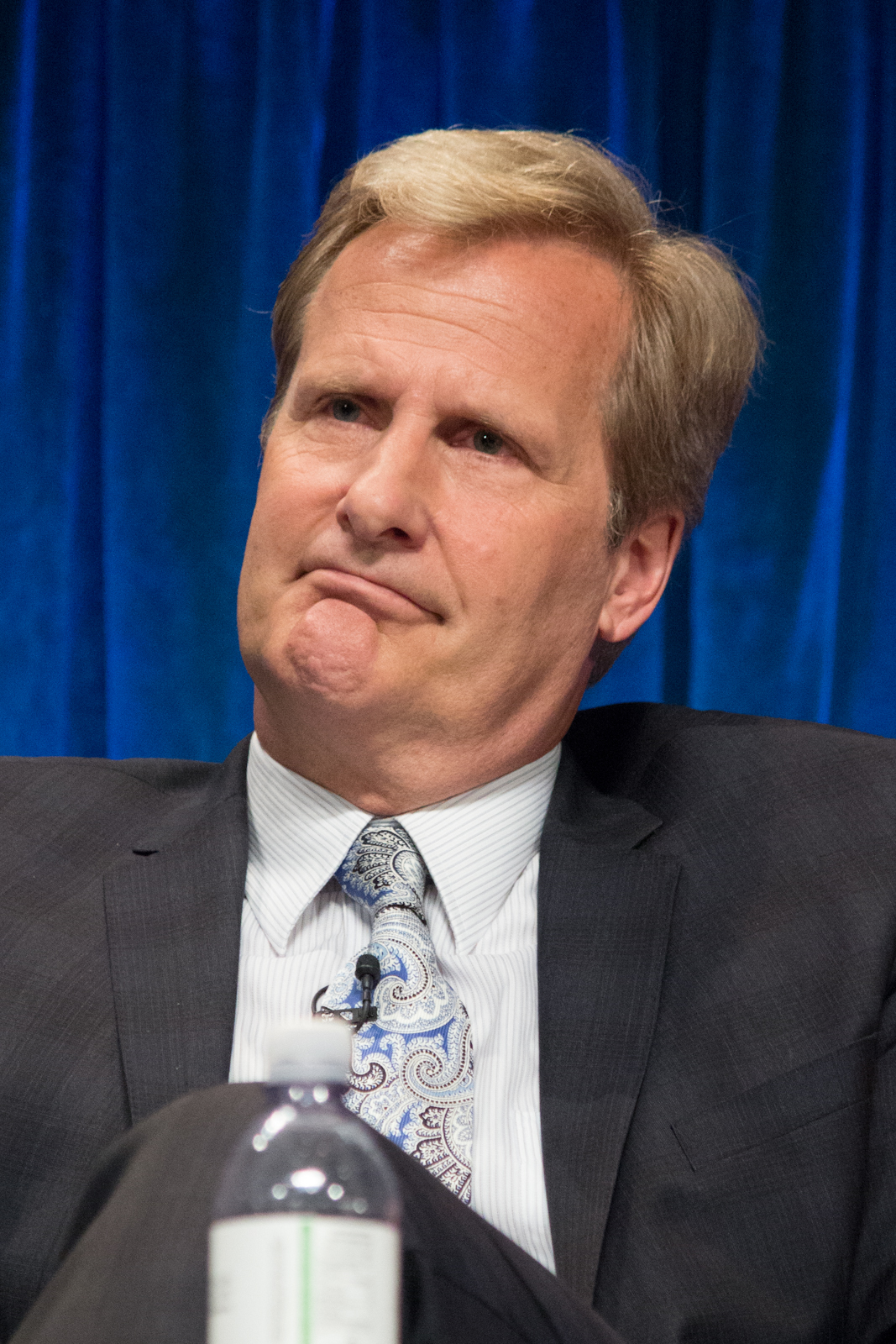
Jeff Daniels

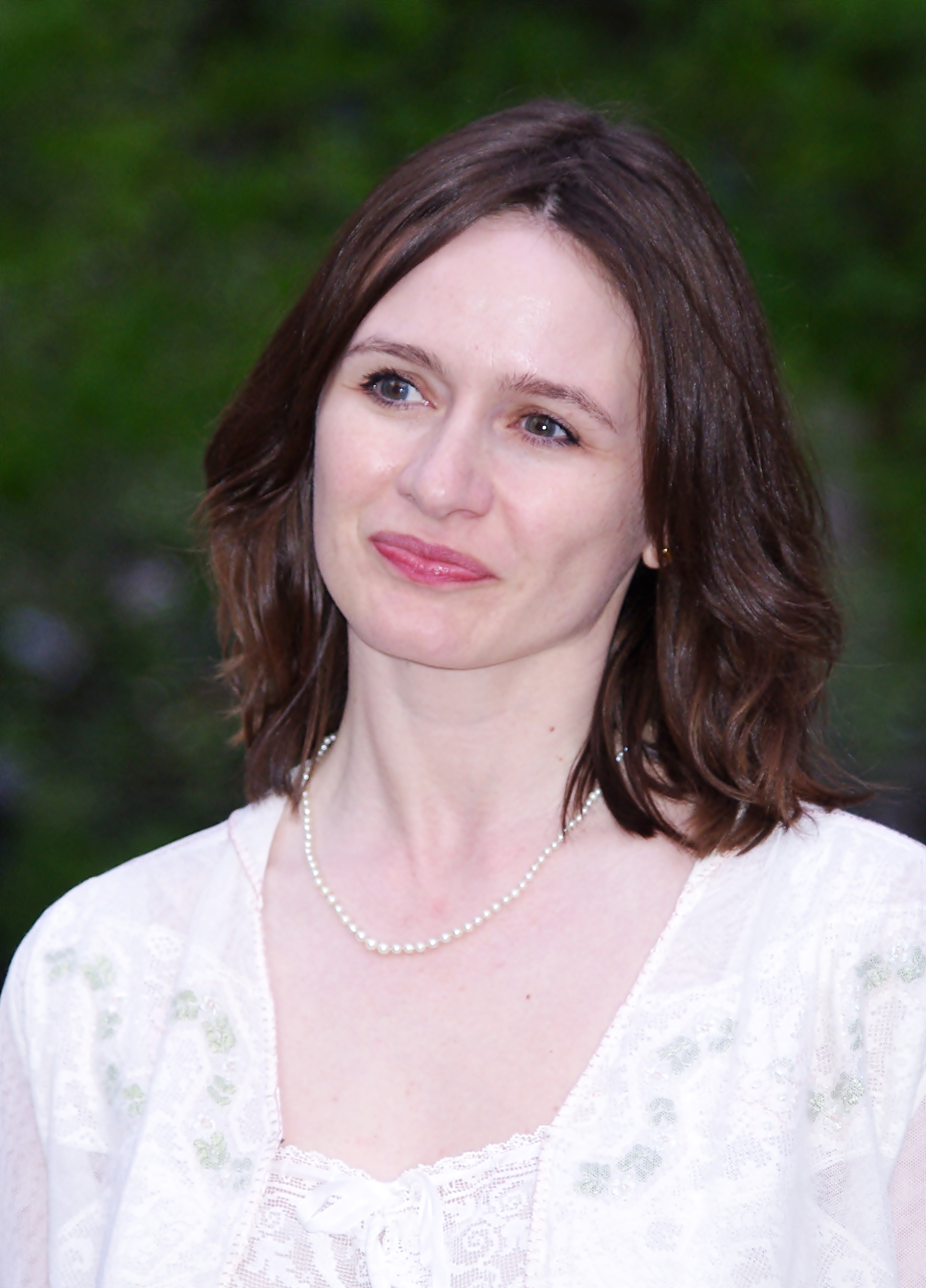
Emily Mortimer

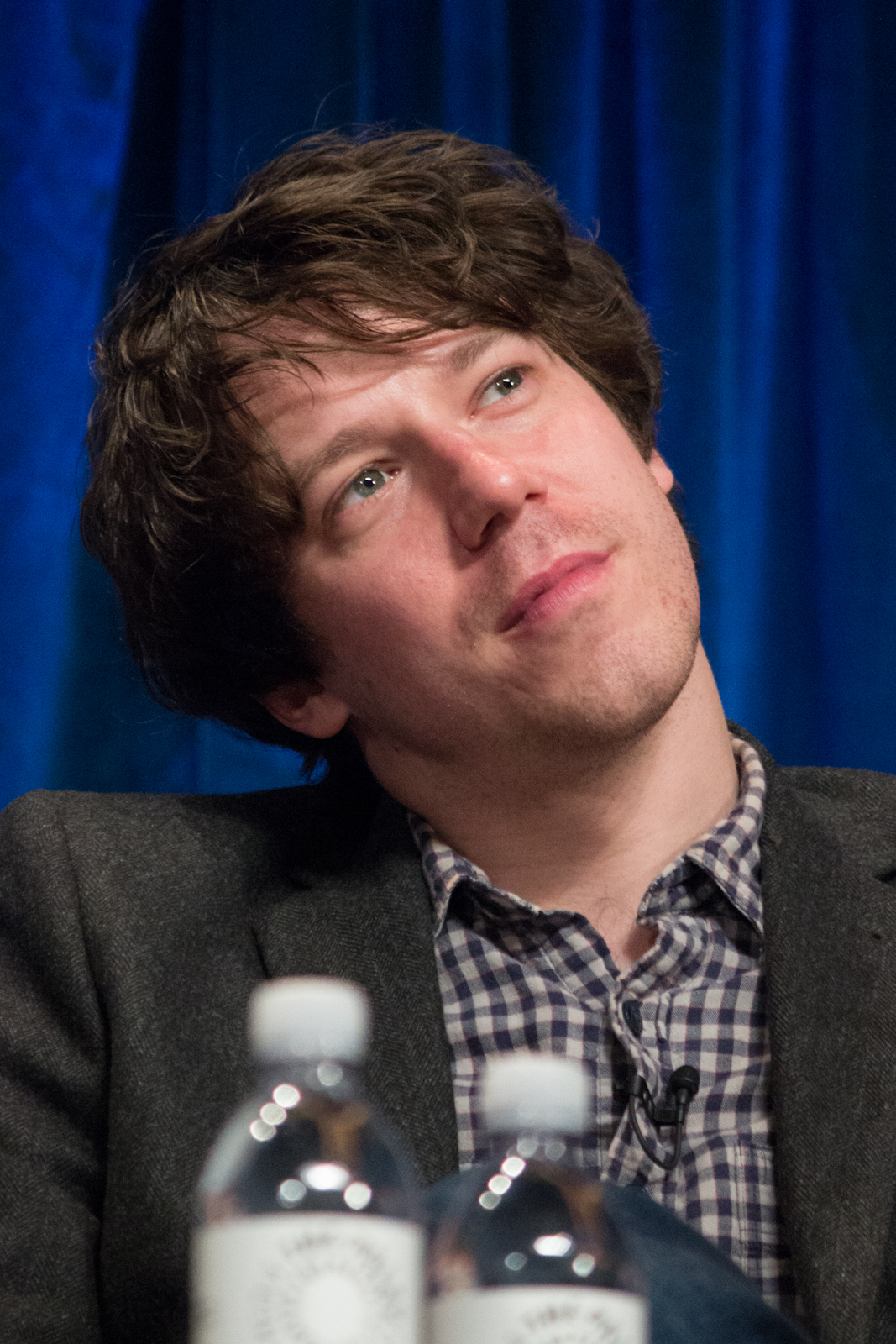
John Gallagher Jr.

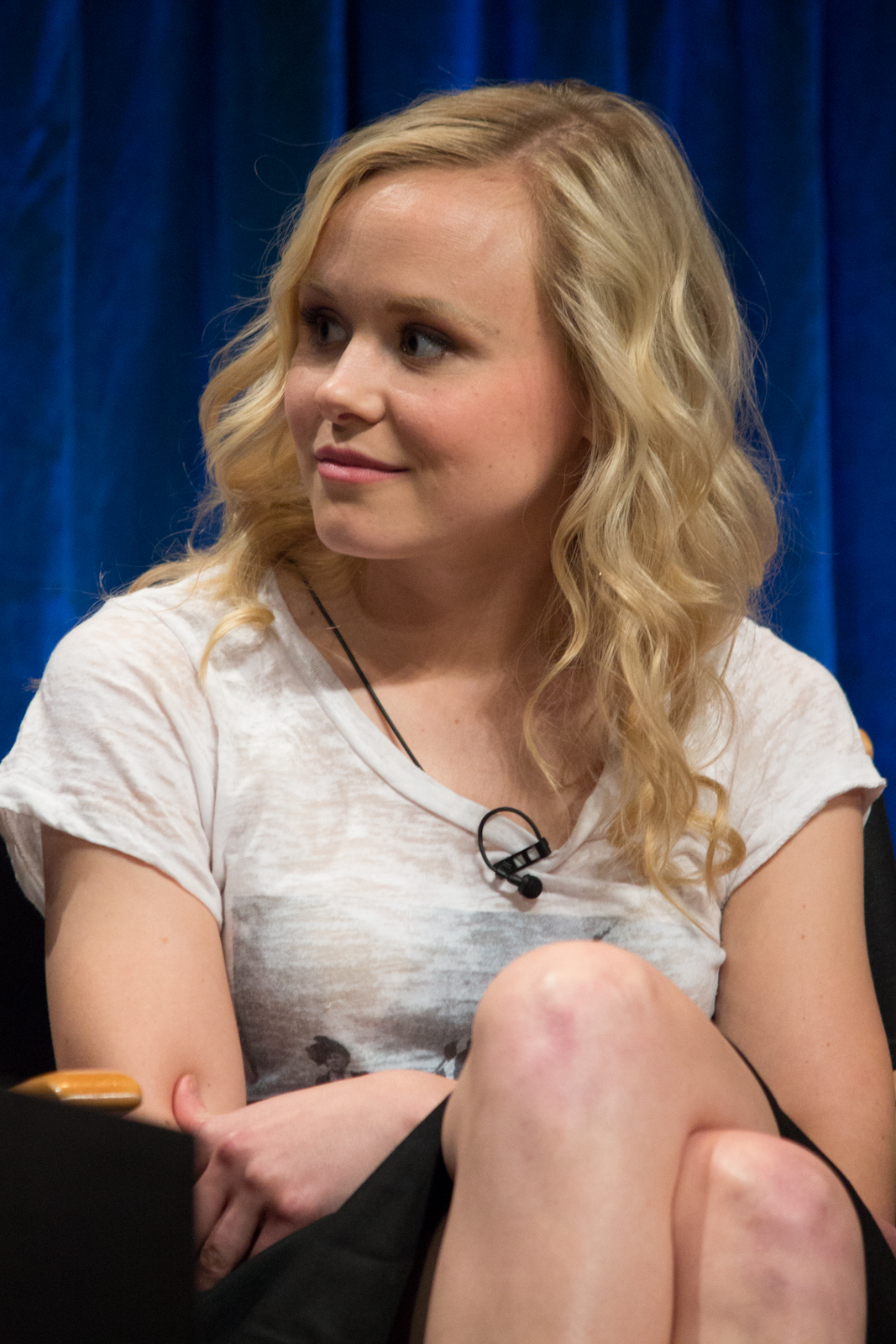
Alison Pill

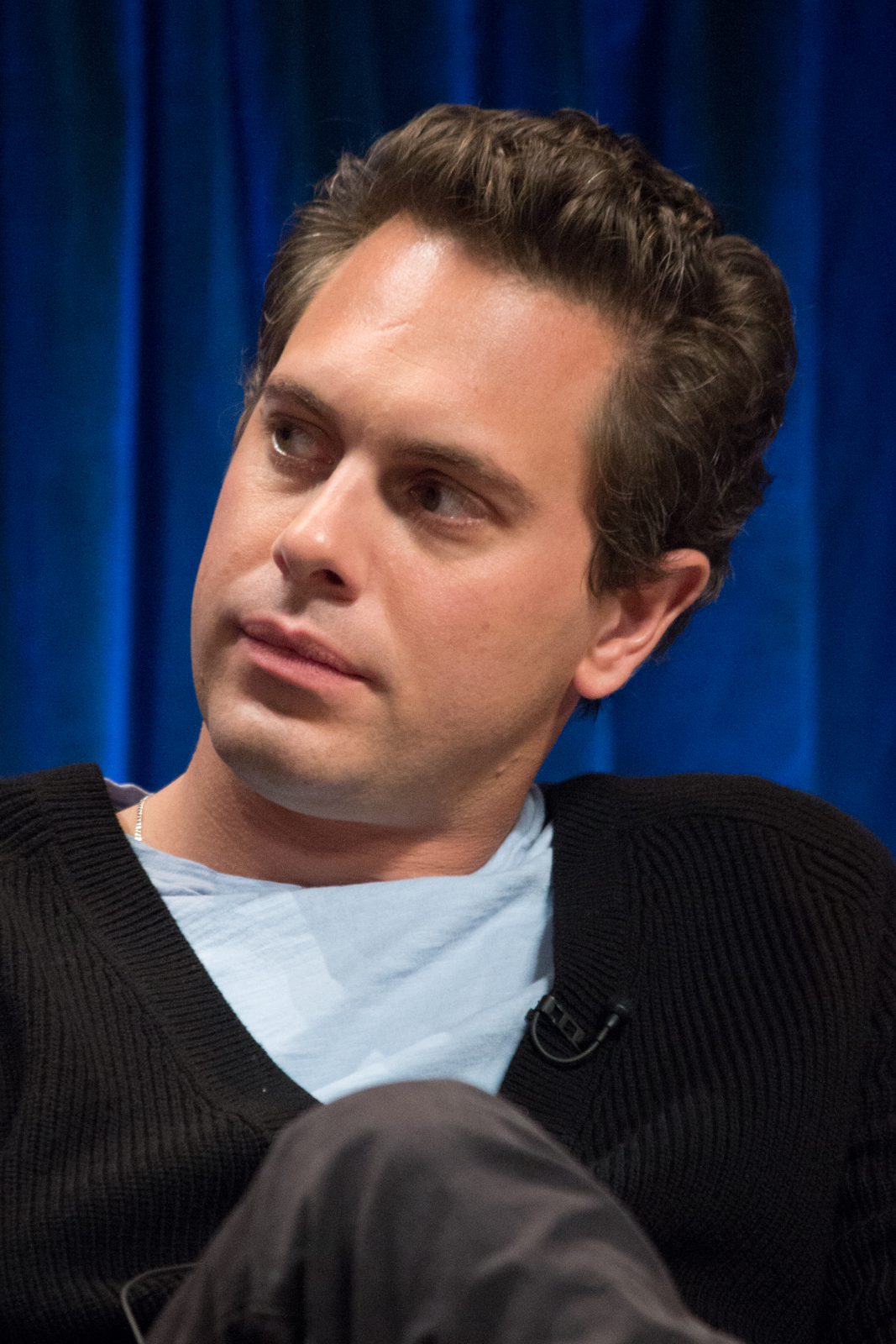
Thomas Sadoski

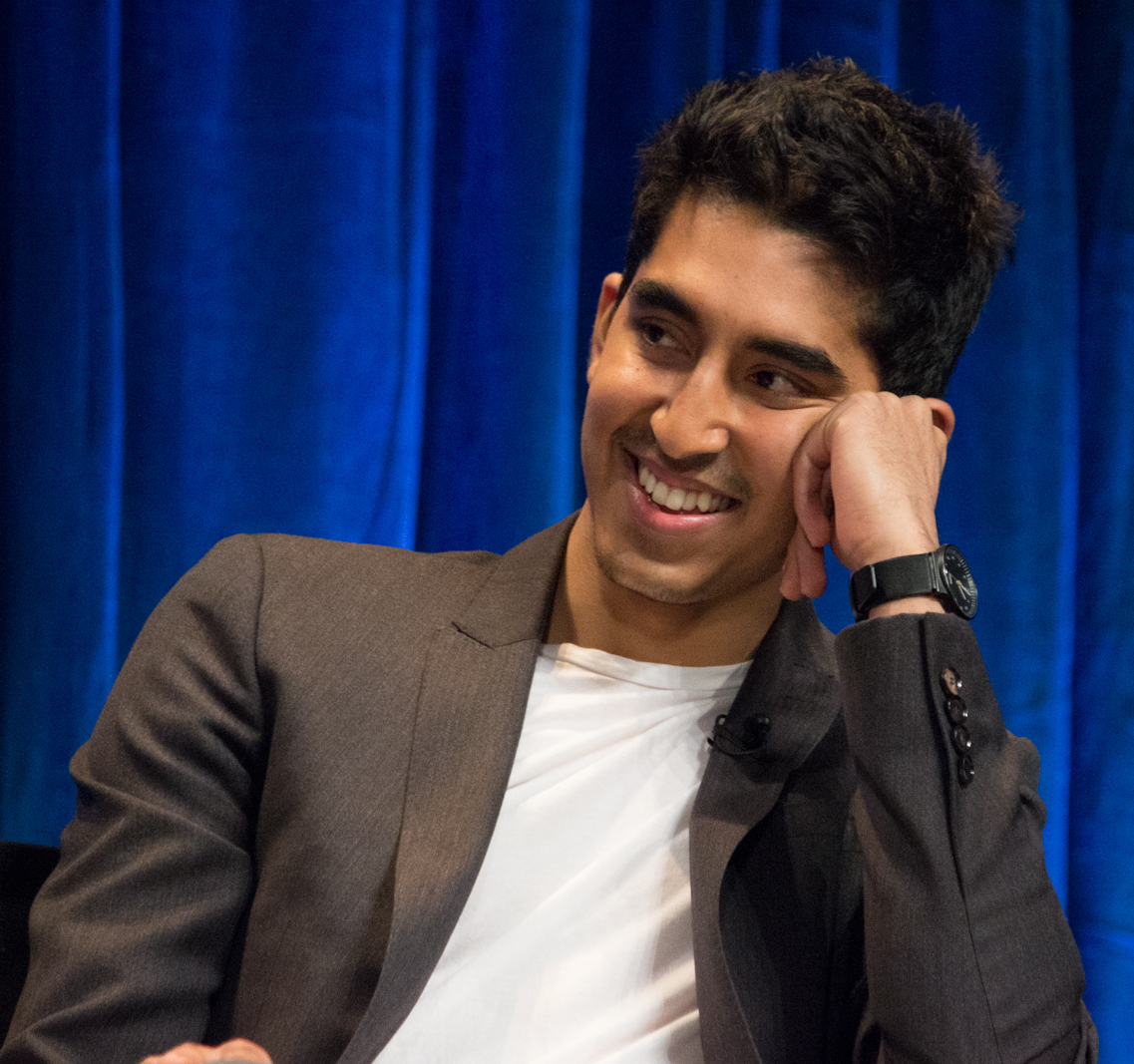
Dev Patel

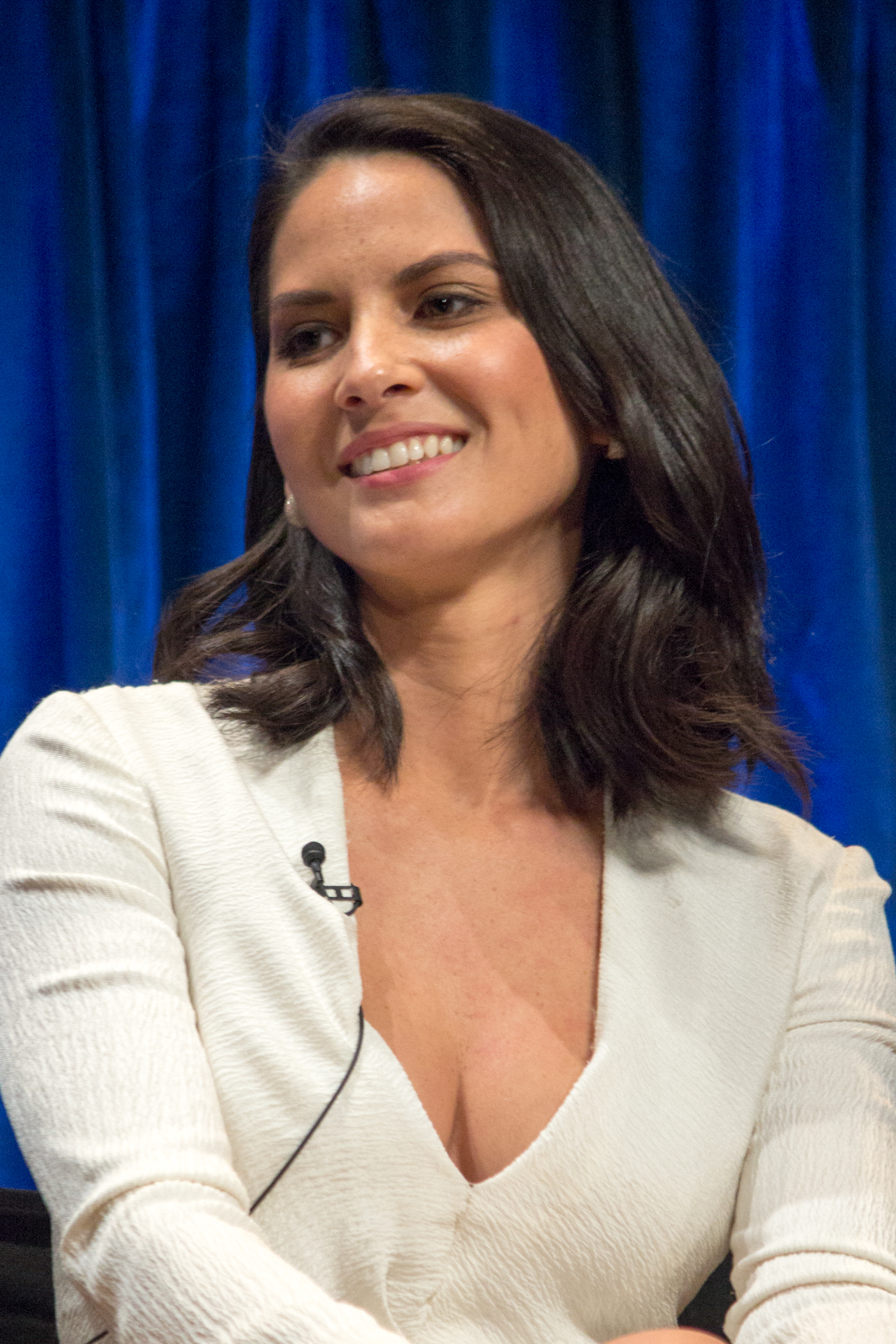
Olivia Munn

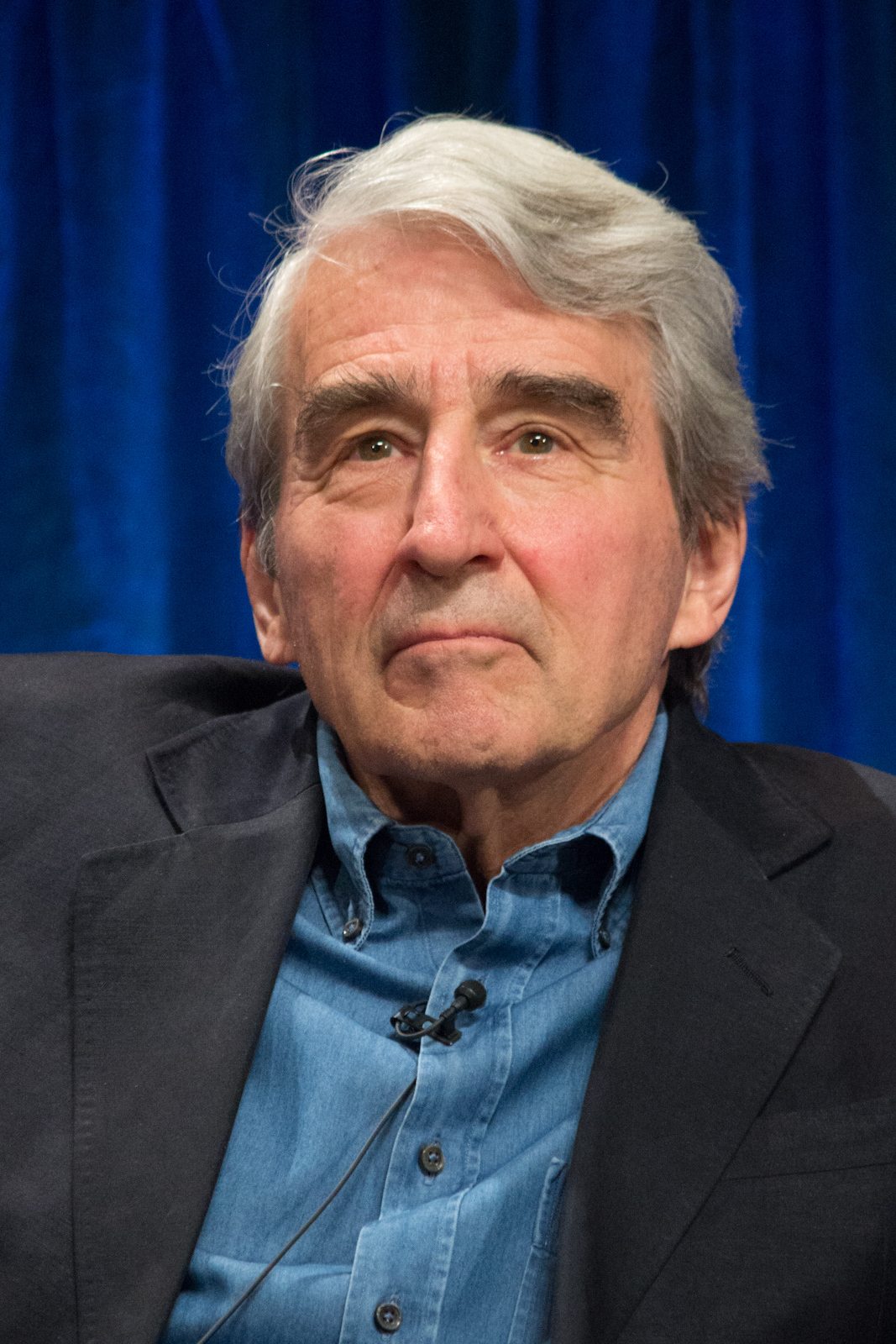
Sam Waterston

=== Main cast ===
- Jeff Daniels as Will McAvoy: the anchor and managing editor of News Night. A moderate Republican news anchor whose broadcast persona is characterized as unwilling to offend anyone. Known for being difficult to work with, his world is turned upside down when his ex-girlfriend MacKenzie re-enters his life with a plan to revamp his news broadcast.
- Emily Mortimer as MacKenzie "Mac" Morgan McHale: News Night's new executive producer and Will's ex-girlfriend, returning from 26 months as an embedded journalist overseas, MacKenzie strives to return ACN to the days of real news broadcasts. MacKenzie had an affair with her ex-boyfriend, Brian Brenner, during her relationship with Will.
- John Gallagher Jr. as Jim Harper: Senior Producer who follows MacKenzie to News Night. At his new job, he develops feelings for Maggie.
- Alison Pill as Maggie Jordan: an eager, young associate producer of News Night. Formerly Will's impromptu personal assistant, she is appointed an assistant producer by MacKenzie. She has complicated personal relationships with Don and Jim.
- Thomas Sadoski as Don Keefer: News Night's former executive producer who leaves for the new program on the network, Right Now with Elliot Hirsch, but continues to work with the News Night team in a variety of capacities. Plain-speaking and straightforward, but also quite insecure, Don begins to doubt his feelings for Maggie. Ultimately, he breaks up with her, encouraging her to go after Jim. He subsequently goes on to date Sloan.
- Dev Patel as Neal Sampat: writer of Will's blog and electronic media expert who documented the London Underground bombings with a camera phone. Neal works with the team to develop the use of electronic media as part of the new format.
- Olivia Munn as Sloan Sabbith: an economist with two Ph.D.s from Duke University, she presents an economic news segment on Will's show. Sloan is good at her job, but also very socially inept and prone to creating uncomfortable situations for herself and others. She develops feelings for Don throughout the show.
- Sam Waterston as Charlie Skinner: Atlantis Cable News (ACN) president and retired US Marine. Charlie's role is to joust with Atlantis World Media owner Leona Lansing and her son, AWM president Reese Lansing, while defending the new News Night format.

=== Supporting cast ===
- Jane Fonda as Leona Lansing: CEO of Atlantis World Media (AWM), the parent company of ACN.
- Adina Porter as Kendra James: a booker for News Night.
- Chris Chalk as Gary Cooper: an associate producer for News Night, and former TMI employee.
- Chris Messina as Reese Lansing: president of AWM, and Leona's son.
- Terry Crews as Lonny Church: Will's bodyguard assigned to him after Will receives death threats. (season 1)
- Kelen Coleman as Lisa Lambert: Maggie's roommate who dates Jim. (seasons 1–2)
- David Harbour as Elliot Hirsch: the anchor of Right Now, a new program on the network.
- Jon Tenney as Wade Campbell: a Congressional candidate who briefly dates MacKenzie to boost his campaign through ACN. (season 1)
- David Krumholtz as Dr. Jacob Habib: Will's current therapist, who is the son of Will's original therapist. (season 1)
- Hope Davis as Nina Howard: a gossip columnist for TMI, AWM's tabloid magazine. (seasons 1–2)
- Stephen McKinley Henderson as Solomon Hancock: a National Security Agency employee who leaks information to Charlie. (season 1)
- Natalie Morales as Kaylee: Neal's girlfriend whose father died on 9/11. (season 1)
- Paul Schneider as Brian Brenner: a writer for New York magazine whom Will hires for an all-access profile. MacKenzie cheated on Will with Brian during the first four months of their relationship. (season 1)
- Marcia Gay Harden as Rebecca Halliday: a litigator defending Atlantis Cable News against First Amendment-related cases. (seasons 2–3)
- Hamish Linklater as Jerry Dantana: a senior producer from ACN's Washington bureau who fills in while Jim is on the campaign trail and brings the Genoa tip to MacKenzie's attention. (season 2)
- Grace Gummer as Hallie Shea: a reporter covering the Mitt Romney campaign. (seasons 2–3)
- Constance Zimmer as Taylor Warren: a spokeswoman for the Mitt Romney campaign. (season 2)
- Aya Cash as Shelly Wexler: Occupy Wall Street advocate. (season 2)
- B. J. Novak as Lucas Pruit: a young, wealthy libertarian interested in buying ACN, whose views on citizen journalism clash with Charlie, Will and Mac's. (season 3)
- Mary McCormack as Molly Levy: an FBI agent who is a friend of Mac. (season 3)
- Clea DuVall as Lilly Hart: a whistleblower who leaks thousands of classified government documents. (season 3)
- Jimmi Simpson as Jack Spaniel: an ethics professor who briefly dates Maggie. (season 3)
- Paul Lieberstein as Richard Westbrook: EPA vice-director. (season 3)
- Derek Webster as Rodger Hutchinson: an FBI agent. (season 3)
- Brian Howe as Barry Lasenthal: a Department of Justice official who prosecutes Will. (season 3)
- Keith Powell as Wyatt Geary: the new VP of human resources who wants to prove that Don is in a relationship with Sloan. (season 3)
- Jon Bass as Bree Dorrit: the temporary substitute for Neal. (season 3)

=== Co-stars ===
- Margaret Judson as Tess Westin: an associate producer for News Night.
- Thomas Matthews as Martin Stallworth: an associate producer for News Night.
- John F. Carpenter as Herb Wilson: the control room head for News Night.
- Trieu Tran as Joey Phan: the graphics producer for News Night.
- Wynn Everett as Tamara Hart: an associate producer and booker for News Night.
- Charlie Weirauch as Jake Watson: a switcher/board op for News Night.
- Chasty Ballesteros as Tea: the bartender at Hang Chews, the karaoke bar frequented by the News Night staff. (seasons 1–2)
- Sarah Scott Davis as Terry Smith: the anchorwoman of Capitol Report, the news bulletin from Washington following News Night.
- Alison Becker as Sandy Whiddles: a professional media source, seeking out involvement in "kiss and tell" stories for financial gain. (season 1)
- Riley Voelkel as Jennifer "Jenna" Johnson: a sophomore student Will encounters at Northwestern University, later hired as Will's assistant.
- John Hawkinson as Rudy: a control-room staffer on News Night. (season 3)
- Frank Cermak as Luke. (season 3)

== Episodes ==
Season	Episodes	Originally released	
Season	Episodes	First released	Last released
1	10	June 24, 2012	August 26, 2012
2	9	July 14, 2013	September 15, 2013
3	6	November 9, 2014	December 14, 2014

=== Season 1 (2012) ===
In season 1, each episode is built around a major news event from the recent past, such as the Deepwater Horizon oil spill and the killing of Osama bin Laden. This acts as a background for the interpersonal drama, as well as providing a sense of familiarity, as the audience is likely to know the context and so not require too much explanation of events. Sorkin has said the news events on the show "will always be real", which, for him, "became a kind of creative gift. For one thing, the audience knows more than the characters do, which is kind of fun. And it gives me the chance to have the characters be smarter than we were." However, he has also said "[i]t is a romanticised, idealised newsroom, a sort of a heightened newsroom – it is not meant to be a documentary."

No. overall	No. in season	Title	Directed by	Written by	Original release date	US viewers (millions)
1	1	"We Just Decided To"	Greg Mottola	Aaron Sorkin	June 24, 2012	2.14
After delivering a public speech on America's shortcomings as a nation during a question and answer session at Northwestern University, acclaimed Atlantis Cable News (ACN) anchor Will McAvoy (Jeff Daniels) returns to his job to find that most of his staff have left or are leaving, and that his new executive producer is his ex-girlfriend, MacKenzie McHale (Emily Mortimer). His boss, Charlie Skinner (Sam Waterston) explains that he has hired McHale to build on Will's performance at Northwestern and create a new, improved version of ACN News. Breaking news about a potentially disastrous oil spill in the Gulf of Mexico hits. McHale's choice for her number two, Jim Harper (John Gallagher, Jr.), ascertains that the oil leak (the Deepwater Horizon oil spill) is uncappable and will flood the Gulf of Mexico. He lobbies for that to be the focus of any reporting rather than the search for survivors since the environmental disaster is the larger and more important story. News Night does an hour show on the event, interviewing sources that no other network had on-air. MacKenzie tells Jim that he should romance Maggie Jordan (Alison Pill) even though (or possibly because) Maggie is going out with departing News Night producer Don Keefer (Thomas Sadoski). MacKenzie promotes Maggie from Will's assistant to an associate producer. The opening scene at Northwestern takes place on March 30, 2010, the rest of the episode takes place on April 20, 2010.
2	2	"News Night 2.0"	Alex Graves	Aaron Sorkin	July 1, 2012	1.68
Mac asserts control over the new incarnation of News Night and enlists on-air economist, Sloan Sabbith (Olivia Munn), to do a nightly segment. Jim takes the fall for Maggie's mistake when doing the prep work for a report on SB 1070. Charlie (Sam Waterston) forbids company president Reese (Chris Messina) from continuing his furtive meeting with Will, and MacKenzie unwittingly informs the team of her infidelity from years earlier. Takes place on April 23, 2010.
3	3	"The 112th Congress"	Greg Mottola	Aaron Sorkin & Gideon Yago	July 8, 2012	2.21
While doing an editorial, Will apologizes for previous newscasts and promises his viewers a better show, which angers the CEO of ACN's parent company. Jim helps Maggie when she suffers a panic attack. Don presents 10 o'clock anchor Elliot (David Harbour) with a challenge. Takes place on November 3, 2010. Flashbacks take place between April and November 2010.
4	4	"I'll Try to Fix You"	Alan Poul	Aaron Sorkin	July 15, 2012	1.94
Will becomes tabloid fodder after a confrontation with a gossip columnist on New Year's Eve, which threatens to undermine his credibility on a current news investigation. Don urges Maggie to set Jim up on a date with her roommate, Mac's boyfriend pitches a story about the government's inability to prosecute financial crimes and Neal (Dev Patel) tries out his Bigfoot theory on anyone who will listen. Concludes with coverage of the shooting of Congresswoman Gabrielle Giffords. Takes place between December 31, 2010, and January 8, 2011.
5	5	"Amen"	Daniel Minahan	Aaron Sorkin	July 22, 2012	1.95
While covering the forced ejection of Egypt's president, the team learns of a protest in Madison, Wisconsin, that is condemning the Governor's plan to balance the budget to the detriment of teachers and other public sector union employees, leading everyone to try to cover the stories simultaneously. Will becomes convinced of a conspiracy by the Koch brothers to "rig the system" in their favor by fighting for Citizens United and then abolishing the Unions. Takes place between February 10 and February 14, 2011.
6	6	"Bullies"	Jeremy Podeswa	Aaron Sorkin	July 29, 2012	1.74
Sloan pinch-hits on Elliot's 10:00 pm show during the Fukushima nuclear crisis following the devastating earthquake, but she puts the network in jeopardy by revealing an off-the-record conversation during her on-air Q&A of a Tokyo power company representative. Also, Will battles insomnia which leads to a revealing therapy session, as he admits to bullying an aide to presidential candidate Rick Santorum during an interview. Takes place between April 11 and April 13, 2011.
7	7	"5/1"	Joshua Marston	Aaron Sorkin	August 5, 2012	1.76
During a party at Will's apartment Charlie receives a call from an anonymous source telling him that he will receive an email from the White House Press Secretary. The email informs him of an impending nationwide presidential address. Will, who is high after eating a large share of marijuana cookies, joins the team as it races to the ACN newsroom to discover what the address will be about, and some assume it is to announce the death of Osama bin Laden. The news that bin Laden has been killed by American special forces is soon confirmed and Will, still high on marijuana, is able to report it. A portion of Obama's speech announcing bin Laden's death aired at the end of the episode, and an additional portion of the audio was played over the credits. Takes place on May 1, 2011.
8	8	"The Blackout Part I: Tragedy Porn"	Lesli Linka Glatter	Aaron Sorkin	August 12, 2012	1.84
The ratings for News Night are in free fall after choosing not to cover a pair of popular tabloid stories. Will and Mac are forced to find a way to bring enough viewers back to justify ACN's quest to air a Republican debate. Will considers writers for an all-access profile, Sloan is upset by the lack of coverage of the emerging debt-ceiling crisis, and Charlie learns the identity of NSA whistleblower codenamed "Late for Dinner". Takes place between May 27, 2011, and June 1, 2011.
9	9	"The Blackout Part II: Mock Debate"	Alan Poul	Aaron Sorkin	August 19, 2012	1.96
A blackout interrupts the interview with a witness who can bring congressman Anthony Weiner's career to an inglorious end. Afterward, it is showtime as Will and the crew preview their new debate format for Republican Party officials, Adam Roth (Adam Arkin) and Tate Brady (Jake McDorman). Jim begins the vetting process for Solomon Hancock, the NSA whistle-blower. Lisa (Kelen Coleman) goes off script during an on-air interview, while Neal begins his trolling assignment. Takes place between June 1 and June 3, 2011.
10	10	"The Greater Fool"	Greg Mottola	Aaron Sorkin	August 26, 2012	2.30
The title of the episode alludes to the greater fool theory. Will suffers an acute case of bleeding from a stomach ulcer and is hospitalized. There, he learns that an elderly black Tennessee resident will not be able to vote because of recently passed voter ID laws in 33 states; this is then the main story when he returns to News Night. Charlie tells the NSA whistle blower, Solomon Hancock, that he cannot use him because he is "contaminated"; later, Hancock commits suicide by throwing himself off the Queensboro Bridge. Sloan tries to draw attention to congressional intransigence on the debt ceiling and ponders a job offer. Everything is overshadowed by a showdown long in the making. It finally explodes as Will, Mac and Charlie confront Leona (Jane Fonda) and Reese during a volatile lunch meeting. TMI gossip columnist Nina Howard (Hope Davis) has information that can destroy Will's career and life by revealing that he was high during the bin Laden report. That bombshell is defused, however, when it is revealed that the magazine obtained the information through hacking MacKenzie's voicemail. Takes place between August 1 and August 8, 2011.

=== Season 2 (2013) ===
The second season features a story arc in which the News Night team has reported, and been forced to retract, a false news story about the United States Marine Corps using sarin gas during the war in Afghanistan in 2009. This story is based on a real-life news scandal from 1998, in which CNN and TIME were both criticized for reporting a dubious and unreliably sourced story that the United States had used Sarin during the Operation Tailwind excursion in the Vietnam War.

No. overall	No. in season	Title	Directed by	Written by	Original release date	US viewers (millions)
11	1	"First Thing We Do, Let's Kill All the Lawyers"	Alan Poul	Story by : Ian Reichbach and Aaron Sorkin; Teleplay by : Aaron Sorkin	July 14, 2013	2.22
Will describes the events of the past year while in a deposition with ACN lawyer Rebecca Halliday (Marcia Gay Harden), and they are briefly interrupted by Maggie, whose hair is now very short, unevenly cut and bright red. Reese Lansing is denied entry to a House committee hearing on SOPA due to Will's comments on the Tea Party as "the American Taliban". Jim Harper assigns himself as ACN's correspondent for the Mitt Romney presidential campaign to get away from Maggie because of his feelings for her. To replace him, Mac calls Jerry Dantana (Hamish Linklater), a producer for ACN's Washington D.C. bureau. Maggie is living with Don, but the two break up after Don discovers a video of Maggie declaring her love for Jim (from the Season 1 finale) posted online. Cyrus West, one of the panelists for News Night, gives Jerry Dantana a tip about a black ops mission called Operation Genoa. Takes place between August 23 and September 12, 2011.
12	2	"The Genoa Tip"	Jeremy Podeswa	Story by : Dana Ledoux Miller & Adam R. Perlman and Aaron Sorkin; Teleplay by : Aaron Sorkin	July 21, 2013	1.88
Jim meets Hallie Shea (Grace Gummer), an embedded reporter with the Romney campaign. Charlie Skinner takes Will off the 9/11 tenth anniversary story because of his American Taliban comment, and Will is condemned on the House floor as a result. Maggie and Sloan track down the person who posted the YouTube video of Maggie's confession about Jim in front of the Sex and the City tour bus, and try to make a deal with her to take it down. However, Maggie's best friend Lisa, (Kelen Coleman) discovers the video and decides to end their friendship. Maggie wants to do a story in Africa and pitches it to Mac. Don tries to convince Will to strengthen coverage of the Troy Davis execution. Jerry Dantana tells Mac about Operation Genoa, a mission allegedly conducted by Marine Special Operations (MARSOC) to rescue two captured Marines by using sarin gas against the enemy. Neal is arrested while filming an Occupy Wall Street protest, and Will goes to the police station to bail him out. Takes place between August 25 and September 21, 2011.
13	3	"Willie Pete"	Lesli Linka Glatter	Story by : Michael Gunn & Elizabeth Peterson and Aaron Sorkin; Teleplay by : Aaron Sorkin	July 28, 2013	1.80
Will meets Nina Howard, a gossip columnist, to convince her not to publish a story about him being taken off the 9/11 anniversary broadcast. Jerry and Mac meet Gunnery Sergeant Eric Sweeney who confirms the Genoa story. They take the story to Charlie Skinner. Maggie prepares to leave for Africa. Neal struggles to convince Mac to do a story on Occupy Wall Street (OWS), but Mac is eventually convinced and allows Neal to find an OWS member for an on-air interview with Will. On the Romney press bus, Jim voices his disgust at the limited answers he receives from the Romney campaign spokespeople, and the lack of questions being asked by the other reporters. Hallie musters the courage to start asking hard questions after Jim's rant. Jim and Hallie, along with a third reporter, Stillman (Cameron Gharaee), are kicked off the press bus after Jim fails to convince the rest of the reporters to take a stand with them. Jerry assembles a team to continue researching Genoa and their search eventually leads to a source who seems to have described the entire event on Twitter. Takes place between September 23 and September 30, 2011.
14	4	"Unintended Consequences"	Carl Franklin	Aaron Sorkin	August 4, 2013	1.62
Rebecca Halliday interviews Maggie about the events of the past year, hoping to establish her credibility as a witness to an interview she conducted as part of Genoa. Maggie and another producer, Gary Cooper (Chris Chalk) leave for Africa. They go to an orphanage in Uganda to do a PR story about the work of US troops. While there, Maggie befriends a little boy named Daniel. After the soldiers leave and the reporters are left at the orphanage overnight, armed cattle raiders arrive and loudly demand their camera in Lugisu. Daniel is shot and killed while Maggie is carrying him on her back as they evacuate. Maggie explains that, after the incident, the trip was cut short, and she was sent home to be debriefed by HR and to undergo psychiatric evaluation. She admits that she was shaken by the incident, particularly as the bullet that killed Daniel would almost certainly have killed her had he not been on her back, but insists that she does not have posttraumatic stress disorder (PTSD). Remembering Maggie's recollection of Daniel playing with her blonde hair, Rebecca curses as she realises that Maggie had cut it herself after having a flashback to that moment, something that would cast doubt on her mental state. Will interviews Shelly (Aya Cash), one of the Occupy Wall Street protesters and embarrasses her on air. Jerry and Neal learn that she knows a person who may have knowledge of Genoa, but she will not lead them to the person until Will apologizes. After Sloan and Don exacerbate the situation, Shelly gets a visit from Will, who admits he deliberately went for her in order to dispel rumours of bias; then reveals that they have already found the source; he gives the team a report he wrote for an NGO, where he documents the use of chemical weapons. Jim is insulted by the Romney Campaign's spokesperson, Taylor Warren (Constance Zimmer), and is offered a 30-minute exclusive interview with Mitt Romney, but gives it to Hallie. Takes place between September 30 and October 3, 2011.
15	5	"News Night with Will McAvoy"	Alan Poul	Aaron Sorkin	August 11, 2013	1.82
Bombs explode in Syria and a couple pretending to be victims of the blast prank call the station. Nude photos of Sloan are leaked online by a disgruntled former boyfriend. She confronts him, punches him in the face, and takes a photo. A Rutgers student, about to be interviewed by Will, posts on Twitter that he will announce he is gay while on the show and Mac stops him from going on when a mistake is made in a report on the shooting of Trayvon Martin. Don tries to correct a statement he made to a reporter at WorldNetDaily. A confidential source gives Charlie a cargo manifest from Operation Genoa that contains a classified item, which Charlie believes is sarin gas. Jim suspects Maggie (who is still shaken from her ordeal in Africa) is drunk at work. Will learns that his father has died. Takes place on March 16, 2012.
16	6	"One Step Too Many"	Julian Farino	Aaron Sorkin	August 18, 2013	1.89
The staff has its first Red Team meeting about Operation Genoa. Charlie Skinner says the story is not ready to air. The team finds another source for the Genoa story, former USMC Gen. Stomtonovich (Stephen Root). Charlie and Mac go to Maryland to meet him and he agrees to be interviewed. Jerry conducts the interview alone after Gen. Stomotonovich asks Maggie to leave the room, as he was not told in advance she would be present and has not had her checked out. Gen. Stomtonovich affirms the existence of sarin gas and his belief that its use may sometimes be justified, but does not say that it was used during Operation Genoa. On his return, Jerry edits the raw footage of the interview so that it appears the General said that sarin gas was used during the operation. After the interview, the staff holds a second Red Team meeting, where Charlie Skinner says the story is still not ready to air. Hallie arranges a double date for her and Jim with her friend and Neal. To Jim's dismay Taylor Warren, the Romney campaign spokesperson, tags along. Warren later reveals that she was recently fired. Will is concerned about his likability with the audience, has a focus group done, and at Nina Howard's urging, attempts to change his public image. Several months later, ACN gets a call from a Lance Corporal, thought to be dead, who was a member of the MARSOC team on Operation Genoa. Later, Charlie recounts his recollection of events to Rebecca Halliday and reveals that the story about Operation Genoa was not true. Takes place between March 21 and August 25, 2012.
17	7	"Red Team III"	Anthony Hemingway	Aaron Sorkin	August 25, 2013	1.47
The staff is being interviewed by Rebecca Halliday and recount how they all failed to discover the Genoa story was false. In a flash back to a few months ago, the third Red Team meeting is being conducted and Will is presented the story. Will reveals that he heard the same story from a source. Charlie says that the story is ready to air. ACN airs the story on September 9, 2012. The next day, revelations from various sources cause the staff to start questioning the story's accuracy. Mac is suspicious and reviews the tape of the interview with the General. She discovers that Jerry edited it and fires him. It is revealed that in addition to the edited interview, Cyrus West (the first source) has political ambitions and exaggerated Operation Genoa, Eric Sweeney (the second source) is discovered to have a traumatic brain injury, Charlie's source provided him with a fake manifest in order to get back at him for firing his son, who is dead (a result of a drug overdose suffered after relapsing when he was fired from ACN); the Lance Corporal, who was interviewed by Mac, was asked leading questions and merely repeated what he heard from Mac and other sources in the interview. Meanwhile, riots are beginning in Cairo because of an American film insulting Islam and a terrorist attack on the American consulate in Benghazi occurs. Will, Charlie, and Mac are all prepared to hand in their resignations to AWM CEO, Leona Lansing, but she rejects them. Takes place between September 9 and September 11, 2012. The final scene takes place in the early morning hours of November 6, 2012.
18	8	"Election Night, Part I"	Jason Ensler	Aaron Sorkin	September 8, 2013	1.76
Will, Charlie, and Mac are trying to convince Leona and her son Reese to accept their resignations. Taylor Warren, formerly with the Romney campaign, is on the ACN election night panel. She gives Maggie a tip about a candidate in California who has condemned Todd Akin, but made a similarly controversial statement several years ago about rape and abortion. The candidate's staff, in order to get ACN to not run the story, gives them a tip that CIA Director David Petraeus will resign because of an affair and that the Commander of US Forces in Afghanistan will be investigated for a relationship with a Florida socialite, who was receiving harassing e-mails from Petraeus' mistress. Sloan discovers a supposedly autographed copy of her book was sold at a charity auction, but she did not actually sign it and asks Neal to track down the buyer. Mac asks Neal to fix the information listed on her Wikipedia page which wrongly states that she was President of the Oxford Union when she actually went to Cambridge, but he has trouble finding an outside source to confirm the information. Don is told by Rebecca Halliday that he will be named in a separate lawsuit by Jerry Dantana. Jim accidentally calls a race too early and spends the night watching it, hoping he will end up being correct. Will tells Mac that her request to be fired at the end of the election night show will be granted. Takes place on Election Night, November 6, 2012.
19	9	"Election Night, Part II"	Alan Poul	Aaron Sorkin	September 15, 2013	1.67
ACN decides to proceed with the story about the candidate in California instead of the Petraeus story. Leona decides to let Reese make the decision on whether to accept the resignations of Will, Charlie, and Mac. Will learns that senior staff will also resign as a result of Genoa and tries to convince them not to. Hallie believes that Maggie cut her own hair and tells Jim of her concern. Jim discovers that his ex-girlfriend (Maggie's roommate, Lisa) has a second job working for a caterer at the campaign watch party. He meets Lisa and encourages her to return to speaking terms with Maggie. Sloan realizes that Don was the one who bought the book, gives him a signed copy, and kisses him. To fix Mac's Wikipedia page, Neal proposes a plan for Jim to give Hallie an article Neal has written under Hallie's name to confirm that Mac was President of the Cambridge Union. Hallie writes the article herself as a gift from "new media". Reese decides not to accept Will, Charlie, and Mac's resignations, but Will and Charlie have already decided not to resign. After Jim confronts her about the truth regarding what happened to Maggie's hair, Lisa begins to rebuild bridges with her. Will asks Mac to marry him and she accepts. The ACN staff celebrates. Takes place on Election Night, November 6, 2012.

=== Season 3 (2014) ===
The third season tackles two controversial topics in news reporting. The first is the subject of citizen journalism, and the season begins with the Boston Marathon bombing and its subsequent investigation, which was quite significantly affected by the reports of social media users. The show takes on a particularly critical tone regarding the role that citizen journalists play in the coverage of major news stories, portraying the spread of misinformation and hindrance to law enforcement that ensues. This is expanded in subsequent episodes, where the idealistic, libertarian views of ACN's new buyer clash with the journalistic integrity of the team. The other major topic is whistleblowing, explored when major character Neal Sampat is contacted by an anonymous source, who leaks details of the US government's complicity in an atrocity in an African state. This leads to a clash between Will and the FBI, resulting in Will's spending time in jail for refusing to name Neal's source and being held in contempt. The whistleblowing storyline takes place in parallel to the Edward Snowden disclosures in 2013.

No. overall	No. in season	Title	Directed by	Written by	Original release date	US viewers (millions)
20	1	"Boston"	Anthony Hemingway	Aaron Sorkin	November 9, 2014	1.21
Experiencing a loss of viewer trust from the Genoa retraction, the news team treats a breaking story about the Boston Marathon bombing with guarded caution. Maggie and Elliot are sent to Boston, and after he has an allergic reaction, she steps in to report in impressive fashion. Sloan, using a computer program that allows her to review financial information in great detail, follows a tip from a friend about a company that may be bought out. Reese gives Sloan data showing heavy losses, but asks her to "be kind" and think big picture when she reports on the company. Neal is contacted by an anonymous source and given a file containing confidential and stolen documents regarding riots overseas. Neal asks his source to send two more documents, and teaches the source how to do it. When they learn of this, Reese, Neal, Charlie, Mac, and Will realize that Neal has likely and inadvertently assisted in committing espionage. Will, informed that ACN has dropped to fourth in the ratings, suggests that he quit. Sloan figures out that the company being taken over is AWM itself, and that they will be the victim of a hostile takeover by Reese's two half-siblings. Jim informs everyone that the second suspect in the bombing was found in a boat in someone's backyard, and Will replies that they need to get confirmation before he goes on the air to say that. Will backtracks on his resignation, stating that they will stand behind Reese, then tells Neal to get legal representation. Takes place between April 14 and April 19, 2013.
21	2	"Run"	Greg Mottola	Aaron Sorkin	November 16, 2014	1.28
Charlie and Reese confront Reese's half-siblings, Randy and Blair (Kat Dennings), about their hostile takeover. After some heated back-and-forth, Leona arrives and offers to buy their shares for a higher price. Neal and Will meet Rebecca Halliday to discuss Neal's legal situation and she confirms that he has committed espionage. She and Will agree that ACN should not run the story. Mac asks her friend, Molly (Mary McCormack), an FBI agent, about espionage charges and the media. Molly tells her that reporters are never charged with espionage but can be charged with contempt. Mac tells Rebecca, Will and Neal they have to run the story. Returning from Boston, Maggie overhears an EPA official, Richard (Paul Lieberstein), on the phone with a reporter, making off-the-record disparaging remarks about the President. Maggie reveals that she overheard, but Richard makes her feel that she has violated ethics and she tells him she won't use any of the story. Richard then gives her an exclusive story and a report that carbon dioxide levels are higher than they have been for millions of years. Don informs Sloan that he purchased stock prior to Sloan reporting it in a newscast. Sloan fears that this is illegal and that their relationship may be against the ACN handbook. Sloan inadvertently informs Jim that she has been sleeping with Don. Hallie sends a middle-of-the-night tweet from the ACN account making a joke in poor taste about the Boston Marathon and Republicans. Though she quickly deletes it, other news sources pick it up and Charlie fires her. After the ACN senior staff discuss Neal's situation with Rebecca, Will realizes that Neal has already confirmed a portion of the leak (concerning Equatorial Kundu), forcing ACN's hand. Will has Neal give him the name of his source, then tells him how to get out of town. As the FBI execute a search warrant on ACN computers, Molly informs Mac, Will and Charlie that Neal will likely be charged with espionage if he is found to have assisted the source in any way. Neal escapes the building, destroying his phone and the note Will gave him telling him to run. Takes place on April 20, 2013.
22	3	"Main Justice"	Alan Poul	Story by : Jon Lovett & Aaron Sorkin; Teleplay by : Aaron Sorkin	November 23, 2014	1.19
The news team threaten to do a live broadcast of the FBI raid on the newsroom in order to persuade them to stand down, which works. Charlie is informed by Leona and Reese that to keep the company running they will need to sell ACN to Lucas Pruit (B. J. Novak), a young, idealistic libertarian billionaire. Don meets the new HR rep, Wyatt (Keith Powell), who believes Don and Sloan are in a relationship. Maggie's segment on the EPA report goes to air with Will interviewing Richard. However, the interview does not go well, as Richard continually remarks that the effect of human CO_{2} emissions into the atmosphere is unchangeable. Will, Mac, Charlie, and Rebecca meet the Attorney General's representative in Washington to discuss Neal's situation, but Will does not offer up any information other than describing how he orchestrated much of the situation himself. At the White House Correspondents' Dinner, Charlie has a meeting with Lucas to discuss buying the network, Mac is approached by a woman named Lily (Clea DuVall) who says, and then confirms, that she is Neal's source, and Will is subpoenaed to appear before a grand jury. Takes place between April 20 and April 27, 2013.
23	4	"Contempt"	Anthony Hemingway	Story by : Deborah Schoeneman & Aaron Sorkin; Teleplay by : Aaron Sorkin	November 30, 2014	1.38
Preparing to air the Kundu story, the team gets the first reporter who wrote the story, along with his family, out of the country safely. Mac has a meeting with Lily in Washington to ask her to extend the deadline to broadcast the story before she leaks it, but she does not promise to. The story is ready to air but Reese says they cannot run it. Instead, Don sends it to his former teacher who works for the Associated Press. Pruit tells the team his new vision for the company, including user-generated content, which Charlie does not like. Sloan and Don keep dodging the human resources rep, however he already knows they are dating and was merely amusing himself. Sloan and Charlie try to find another buyer for ACN, but are unsuccessful when they find out the new buyer has just been using them as leverage to buy another company. Jim and Hallie fight over their views of journalism and break up after she writes about a fight they had for her new online column. Will continues to defy the government by refusing to name the source of the stolen documents and is held in contempt and sentenced to jail. Before he goes to jail, he and Mac get married at the courthouse. Takes place between April 27 and May 3, 2013.
24	5	"Oh Shenandoah"	Paul Lieberstein	Aaron Sorkin	December 7, 2014	1.36
ACN continues its charge towards younger ratings by sending Don out to get a story on campus rape and the Internet reporting of rape, and having Sloan interview Neal's temporary replacement, Bree Dorritt, about ACN's new celebrity sighting/stalking app. Will, still serving his contempt detention for refusing to reveal his source, has a troubling conversation with a new cell mate (Kevin Rankin), who is later revealed to be Will's vision of his dead father. Jim and Maggie attempt a fruitless search for Edward Snowden at a Russian airport, eventually ending up on a false-alarm 13-hour plane flight. This, along with Maggie's constant badgering that Jim call Hallie to make amends, causes them to finally argue about their mutual attraction. Jim demands to know why Maggie hasn't recognised his feelings for her, and Maggie in turn confronts him over the fact that he had gone on to date Hallie despite having full knowledge that Don had broken up with her, and why. To escape the resulting awkwardness, Jim changes seats with another passenger, but Maggie, after thinking things through, eventually gets him to return to his original seat beside her so that she can kiss him. Sloan berates and condemns Bree's app on the air, and after the show, Pruit storms into the studio in a blind rage and demands Mac and Sloan's firing. Charlie informs Pruit that only he has the power to fire anyone and clashes with Don over his objection to interviewing a rape victim in front of the student she accused. On the way to talk about the situation privately, Charlie has a heart attack and newsroom staff run to his aid. As Will is released from prison, he is told by Mac that Charlie has died. Takes place between May 3 and June 24, 2013.
25	6	"What Kind of Day Has It Been" (Note: "What Kind of Day Has It Been" is also the title of the season/series finales of the other Aaron Sorkin shows: Sports Night (season 1, episode 23), The West Wing (season 1, episode 22), and Studio 60 on the Sunset Strip (episode 22))	Alan Poul	Aaron Sorkin	December 14, 2014	1.62
Set around Charlie's funeral service and wake, a series of flashbacks show how his vision created the new format for News Night, how he hired Mac, how Mac told the young student at Will's first episode question and answer scene how to be the first at the microphone to ask a question, how Charlie led Will into becoming a better journalist, and other pre-series situations including Don and Sloan's first meeting. Neal returns from Venezuela and is disappointed at how the new team is running ACN Digital and tells them they are going to rebuild it. Leona talks Pruit into rectifying his emerging negative image with women by hiring Mac as the network president, replacing Charlie. Mac and Will find out that she is pregnant, and Will quits smoking as a result. Mac makes Jim the show's executive producer after offering the job to Don, who chooses to stay with and improve the 10 o'clock news show. Jim arranges for Maggie to be offered a field producer's job in D.C. and Maggie has mixed feelings about this until she talks to Sloan. Jim also offers her the senior producer position but Maggie decides to take the job in D.C. Maggie questions why their relationship will succeed if Jim's previous long-distance relationships failed, and is caught off guard with his response: "I wasn't in love with them." The newsroom staff prepare and broadcast their next News Night. Takes place on June 27, 2013. Flashbacks take place three years earlier in 2010.

== Production ==
=== Development ===
Entertainment Weekly reported in April 2009 that Sorkin, while still working on the screenplay for The Social Network, was contemplating a new TV drama about the behind-the-scenes events at a cable news program. Sorkin was the series creator of Sports Night and Studio 60 on the Sunset Strip, both shows depicting the off-camera happenings of fictional television programs. Talks were reportedly ongoing between Sorkin and HBO since 2010. In January 2011, Sorkin revealed the project on BBC News.

To research the cable news world, Sorkin had been an off-camera guest at MSNBC's Countdown with Keith Olbermann in 2010 to observe the show's production and quizzed Parker Spitzer's staff when he was a guest on that show. He also spent time shadowing Hardball with Chris Matthews as well as other programs on Fox News and CNN. Sorkin told TV Guide that he intended to take a less cynical view of the media: "They're going to be trying to do well in a context where it's very difficult to do well when there are commercial concerns and political concerns and corporate concerns." Sorkin decided that rather than have his characters react to fictional news events as on his earlier series, The Newsroom would be set in the recent past and track real-world stories largely as they unfolded, to give a greater sense of realism.

HBO ordered a pilot in January 2011 with the working title More as This Story Develops. The Social Network's Scott Rudin signed on as executive producer. Rudin's only previous television work was the 1996 spin-off series Clueless. By June, Jeff Daniels, Emily Mortimer, Sam Waterston, Olivia Munn, and Dev Patel were cast, while Greg Mottola had signed on to direct the pilot. The pilot script was later reportedly obtained by several news outlets.

On September 8, 2011, HBO ordered a full series starting with an initial 10-episode run with a premiere date set for summer 2012. A day after the second episode aired, HBO renewed the series for a second season.

Sorkin said in June 2012 that The Newsroom "is meant to be an idealistic, romantic, swashbuckling, sometimes comedic but very optimistic, upward-looking look at a group of people who are often looked at cynically. The same as with The West Wing, where ordinarily in popular culture our leaders are portrayed either as Machiavellian or dumb; I wanted to do something different and show a highly competent group of people."

=== Series title ===
While the pilot was in development, the project was tentatively titled More as This Story Develops. On November 29, 2011, HBO filed for a trademark on "The Newsroom" with the U.S. Patent and Trademark Office. The new name immediately drew comparisons with the Ken Finkleman-created Canadian comedy series of the same name that aired on CBC and public television stations in the U.S. The series' name was confirmed as The Newsroom in an HBO promo released on December 21, 2011, previewing its programs for 2012.

Writing in Maclean's, Jaime Weinman said the choice of name was "a bit of a grimly amusing reminder that the U.S. TV industry doesn't take Canada very seriously ... The Newsroom is often considered the greatest show Canada has ever produced, but a U.S. network feels no need to fear unflattering comparisons: assuming they've heard of the show, they probably think most people in the States have not heard of it." In an interview with The Daily Beast following the Sorkin show's premiere, Finkleman revealed that HBO did contact him for permission to reuse the title, which he granted.

=== Casting ===
Jeff Daniels was cast in the lead role in March 2011. Alison Pill and Olivia Munn reportedly entered negotiations to star in April 2011. The fictional executive producer role was initially offered to Marisa Tomei, but negotiations fell through. Tomei was replaced by Emily Mortimer in May 2011. Sam Waterston also joined the project in May. John Gallagher Jr., Thomas Sadoski, and Dev Patel were added to the cast in June 2011.

New York magazine reported that Sorkin had planned for MSNBC host Chris Matthews and Andrew Breitbart to appear in a roundtable debate scene in the pilot; however, the idea was shot down by MSNBC purportedly because the network was displeased with the corporate culture portrayal of cable news and skewering of left-leaning media in the show's script. Chris Matthews' son, Thomas, joined the cast in the role of Martin Stallworth, an associate producer for the fictional show.

Three months after the series was picked up, Jane Fonda signed on to play Leona Lansing, the CEO of the fictional network's parent company. Fonda was married to Turner Broadcasting System and CNN founder Ted Turner for 10 years. Lansing was touted by some observers as a female version of Fonda's ex-husband. The name "Leona Lansing" is taken from the names of two highly successful businesswomen, real estate developer Leona Helmsley and former Paramount Pictures CEO Sherry Lansing.

Jon Tenney guest-starred as Wade, MacKenzie's boyfriend. Natalie Morales has a guest role as Kaylee, Neal's girlfriend. Terry Crews plays Lonny, Will's bodyguard.

Rosemarie DeWitt was originally cast as Rebecca Halliday, a litigator who is tasked with defending ACN in a wrongful termination suit in the second season, but DeWitt had to vacate the role due to scheduling conflicts. The role was recast with Marcia Gay Harden. Patton Oswalt was announced to play Jonas Pfeiffer, the new V.P. of human resources at ACN, in November 2012, but he ultimately did not appear in the season.

=== Filming ===
The Newsroom's set was located in Sunset Gower Studios, Hollywood, on Stage 7. The fictional Atlantis World Media building, however, is actually the Bank of America Tower on Sixth Avenue and 42nd Street in Manhattan (directly across the street from HBO's New York City offices at the time of filming), with CGI being used to change the name of the building above the entrance. Production began in the fall of 2011. The schedule called for each episode—comprising a dialogue-dense script of 80 to 90 pages – to be filmed in nine days, as opposed to six to seven pages per day for broadcast network TV series. The pilot episode was shot on 16 mm film, while the rest of the series was shot digitally with Arri Alexa cameras. Some external filming took place in New York City.

=== Writing team ===
With fewer than 10 credited writers, The Newsroom has fewer writers than most other television series. It was reported that Sorkin planned to replace most of the first season's writers in the second season. He later said this was untrue. Sorkin explained his approach to writing:

I create these shows so that I can write them. I'm not an empire builder. I'm not interested in just producing. All I want to do is write. I came up as a playwright—writing is something you do by yourself in a room. That said, I couldn't possibly write the show without that room full of people. I go in there, and we kick around ideas. I'm writing about all kinds of things I don't know anything about. So they do research for me.

Sorkin hired conservative media consultants for the second season to help him represent "every part of the ideological spectrum," thus giving the show "a political perspective that I don't have." Sorkin also revealed that the second season would include the 2012 United States presidential election.

== Broadcast ==
The Newsroom premiered in the United States on HBO on June 24, 2012. It was watched by 2.1 million viewers, making it one of HBO's most-watched series premieres since 2008. The first episode was made available free to all viewers on multiple platforms, including HBO.com, iTunes, YouTube, and other free on-demand services.

=== International ===
The show aired simultaneously on HBO Canada. It premiered on Sky Atlantic in the United Kingdom and Ireland on July 10, 2012, two weeks after its U.S. debut. In Germany and Austria The Newsroom premiered on Sky's video-on-demand service Sky Go one day after the U.S. premiere on June 25, 2012, and Sky Anytime one day later. HBO Europe also began airing the show in all twelve countries with appropriate subtitles one day after the U.S. premiere. The show premiered in New Zealand on August 13, 2012, on SKY NZ's SoHo channel. The show debuted in Australia on the SoHo channel on August 20, 2012. In India, the show premiered on HBO Defined on May 21, 2013, season 2 premiered on July 30, 2013, with episodes airing two weeks after the U.S. premiere, and season 3 premiered on November 10, 2014, one day after the U.S. premiere. As of 2019, all episodes are available for streaming on Hotstar.

== Reception ==
=== Ratings ===
The Newsroom : U.S. viewers per episode (millions)

Season	Episode number										Average
Season	1	2	3	4	5	6	7	8	9	10	Average
1	2.14	1.68	2.21	1.94	1.95	1.74	1.76	1.84	1.96	2.30	1.9
2	2.22	1.88	1.80	1.62	1.82	1.89	1.47	1.76	1.67	–	1.76
3	1.21	1.28	1.19	1.38	1.36	1.62	–				1.34

Audience measurement performed by Nielsen Media Research

=== Critical response ===
Critical reaction to the series in its first season was mixed. The show's second and third seasons saw more positive responses from reviewers.

==== Season 1 ====
On Metacritic, the first season scored 56 out of 100, based on 31 critic, indicating "mixed or average reviews". On Rotten Tomatoes, the first season has a rating of 50%, based on 50 reviews, with an average rating of 6.7/10. The site's critical consensus reads, "Though it sports good intentions and benefits from moments of stellar dialogue and a talented cast, The Newsroom may feel too preachy, self satisfied, and cynical to appeal to a wide range of viewers."

Tim Goodman of The Hollywood Reporter writes that how viewers respond to the show "has everything to do with whether you like [Aaron Sorkin's] style. Because ... Sorkin is always true to himself and doesn't try to cover his tendencies or be embarrassed by them". Alessandra Stanley of The New York Times commented that "at its best ... The Newsroom has a wit, sophistication and manic energy.... But at its worst, the show chokes on its own sanctimony". Time's James Poniewozik criticized the show for being "smug" and "intellectually self-serving", with "Aaron Sorkin writing one argument after another for himself to win." Los Angeles Times critic Mary McNamara said the show's drama is "weighted too heavily toward sermonizing diatribes".

Reviews by American newscasters have been mixed as well. Jake Tapper, then of ABC News, criticized Sorkin's partisanship: "they extol the Fourth Estate's democratic duty, but they believe that responsibility consists mostly of criticizing Republicans." Dave Marash of Al Jazeera was not convinced that the show portrays the news industry accurately. On August 1, 2012, Sorkin responded to critics by including news consultants with newsroom experience. Former CBS Evening News anchor Dan Rather gave the pilot a favorable review, saying the show "has the potential to become a classic".

Actor Thomas Sadoski later said he found it funny that a scene of his character announcing the news of Osama bin Laden's death on an airplane had become a frequent and widespread Internet meme.

==== Season 2 ====
The second season received generally favorable reviews. It has a score of 66 out of 100, based on 20 critics, from review aggregation website Metacritic. On Rotten Tomatoes, the season holds a rating of 69%, based on 39 reviews, with an average rating of 6.9/10. The site's critical consensus reads, "Thanks to focused storytelling and a more restrained tone, The Newsroom finds surer footing in its second season, even if it still occasionally succumbs to Aaron Sorkin's most indulgent whims."

In an early review of season 2, Verne Gay of Newsday called it: "Edgier, more sharply drawn, while that Sorkian chatter remains at a very high boil." Oscar Moralde of Slant Magazine noted what he referred to as the show's "grandiloquent speechifying", but praised Olivia Munn, calling her "a joy to watch" and concluded that "season two of The Newsroom salvages the promise of becoming something urgent and vital". Brian Lowry of Variety, in a negative review, said: "Ultimately, one needn't be a purveyor of snark to view The Newsroom as a disappointment—too smart to be dismissed, but so abrasive as to feel like Media Lectures for Dummies." Emily VanDerWerff of The A.V. Club gave season 2 an overall "B−" grade.

==== Season 3 ====
Ahead of season 3 in response to some critical reaction, Sorkin said during a talk at the Tribeca Film Festival in April 2014 that he wished he could "start over" in terms of how journalists perceived the show, emphasizing that he wasn't trying to teach real journalists a lesson with the setting in the recent past, but did so so he wouldn't have to make up fake news.

The third and final season received positive reviews. On Metacritic, it has a score of 63 out of 100, based on 16 critics, indicating "generally favorable reviews". On Rotten Tomatoes, the season has a rating of 61%, based on 41 reviews, with an average rating of 7.5/10. The site's consensus reads, "With an energetic new arc and deeper character development, The Newsroom finds itself rejuvenated in its third season—even if it still occasionally serves as a soapbox for creator Aaron Sorkin."

=== Awards and nominations ===
Year	Award	Category	Nominee(s)	Result	Ref.
2012	Critics' Choice Television Award	Most Exciting New Series	The Newsroom	Won	
2012	Golden Globe Award	Best Television Series – Drama	The Newsroom	Nominated	
2012	Golden Globe Award	Best Actor – Television Series Drama	Jeff Daniels	Nominated	
2012	Directors Guild of America Awards	Outstanding Directing for a Drama Series	"We Just Decided To", Greg Mottola	Nominated	
2012	Writers Guild of America Awards	Outstanding Writing for a New Series	Brendan Fehily, David M. Handelman, Cinque Henderson, Paul Redford, Ian Reichbach, Amy Rice, Aaron Sorkin, Gideon Yago	Nominated	
2012	Screen Actors Guild Award	Outstanding Male Actor in a Drama Series	Jeff Daniels	Nominated	
2013	Primetime Emmy Awards	Outstanding Lead Actor in a Drama Series	Jeff Daniels	Won	
2013	Primetime Emmy Awards	Outstanding Guest Actress in a Drama Series	Jane Fonda	Nominated	
2013	Primetime Emmy Awards	Outstanding Main Title Design	Michael Riley, Denny Zimmerman, Cory Shaw, Justine Gerenstein, and Bob Swensen	Nominated	
2014	Screen Actors Guild Awards	Outstanding Male Actor in a Drama Series	Jeff Daniels	Nominated	
2014	Primetime Emmy Award	Outstanding Lead Actor in a Drama Series	Jeff Daniels	Nominated	
2014	Primetime Emmy Award	Outstanding Guest Actress in a Drama Series	Jane Fonda	Nominated	
2015	Primetime Emmy Award	Outstanding Lead Actor in a Drama Series	Jeff Daniels	Nominated	
