= We Just Decided To =

- The Newsroom episode
- Episode no.: Season 1 Episode 1
- Directed by: Greg Mottola
- Written by: Aaron Sorkin
- Original air date: June 24, 2012
- Running time: 75 minutes

Guest appearances
- Elizabeth Marvel as Sharon; Jason Butler Harner as Lewis; David Harbour as Elliot Hirsch; Chris Chalk as Gary Cooper; Adina Porter as Kendra James; David Cromer as Debate Moderator

Episode chronology
← Previous —	Next → "News Night 2.0"

"We Just Decided To" is the first episode of the first season of the American television series The Newsroom. It first aired on June 24, 2012 in the United States on HBO. "We Just Decided To" was written by creator Aaron Sorkin and directed by Greg Mottola. In the aftermath of his public tirade, acclaimed Atlantis Cable News anchor Will McAvoy (Jeff Daniels) returns to his job to find that most of his staff are leaving and his new executive producer is his ex-girlfriend, MacKenzie McHale (Emily Mortimer) and when some breaking news about a potentially disastrous oil spill in the Gulf of Mexico hits the network, the staff faces a new challenge.

Entertainment Weekly reported in April 2009 that Sorkin, while still working on the screenplay for The Social Network, was contemplating a new TV drama about the behind-the-scenes events at a cable news program. To research the cable news world, Sorkin had been an off-camera guest at MSNBC's Countdown with Keith Olbermann in 2010 to observe the show's production and quizzed Parker Spitzer's staff when he was a guest on that show. Sorkin told TV Guide that he intended to take a less cynical view of the media: "They're going to be trying to do well in a context where it's very difficult to do well when there are commercial concerns and political concerns and corporate concerns."

According to the Nielsen Media Research, the episode attained 2.14 million viewers upon initial airing. "We Just Decided To" received mixed reviews from critics.

== Plot ==
The series opens with news anchor Will McAvoy participating in a panel at Northwestern University's Medill School of Journalism and giving a controversial speech on America's recent decline as a nation, shocking the audience. He then goes on vacation for two weeks to let the dust settle, and comes back to work only to find that his executive producer and most of his team are leaving him for another news anchor. He also discovers that his boss, Charlie Skinner, has hired him a new executive producer: Mackenzie MacHale, Will's ex-girlfriend with whom Will has bad history. He protests, but Charlie is adamant, insisting that Mackenzie will build on his performance at Northwestern and help develop a new, improved news broadcast. Will eventually allows Mackenzie to work with him but only under the condition that he can fire her at the end of each week.

A news alert comes in about an explosion off the Gulf of Mexico, but Don Keefer, the original executive producer, doesn't find it to be worth pursuing. Meanwhile, Jim Harper, one of Mackenzie's team members, claims that the fire is actually an oil rig explosion and that the oil spill has yet to be plugged thanks to anonymous tips that turn out to be solicited from his relatives. Will decides to take up the case and the Louisiana oil spill becomes the main piece for the evening show. Their show ends up being the only one to do the piece on the oil spill.

== Production ==
=== Development ===
Entertainment Weekly reported in April 2009 that Sorkin, while still working on the screenplay for The Social Network, was contemplating a new TV drama about the behind-the-scenes events at a cable news program. Sorkin was the series creator of Sports Night and Studio 60 on the Sunset Strip, both shows depicting the off-camera happenings of fictional television programs. Talks were reportedly ongoing between Sorkin and HBO since 2010. In January 2011, Sorkin revealed the project on BBC News.

To research the cable news world, Sorkin had been an off-camera guest at MSNBC's Countdown with Keith Olbermann in 2010 to observe the show's production and quizzed Parker Spitzer's staff when he was a guest on that show. He also spent time shadowing Hardball with Chris Matthews as well as other programs on Fox News Channel and CNN. Sorkin told TV Guide that he intended to take a less cynical view of the media: "They're going to be trying to do well in a context where it's very difficult to do well when there are commercial concerns and political concerns and corporate concerns." Sorkin decided that rather than have his characters react to fictional news events as on his earlier series, The Newsroom would be set in the recent past and track real-world stories largely as they unfolded, in order to give a greater sense of realism.

In January 2011, HBO ordered a pilot with the working title More as This Story Develops. The Social Network's Scott Rudin signed on as executive producer. Rudin's only previous television work was the 1996 spinoff series Clueless. By June, Jeff Daniels, Emily Mortimer, Sam Waterston, Olivia Munn, and Dev Patel were cast, while Greg Mottola had signed on to direct the pilot. The pilot script was later reportedly obtained by several news outlets.

On September 8, 2011, HBO ordered a full series starting with an initial 10-episode run with a premiere date set for summer 2012. A day after the second episode aired, HBO renewed the series for a second season.

=== Series title ===
While the pilot was in development, the project was tentatively titled More as This Story Develops. On November 29, 2011, HBO filed for a trademark on "The Newsroom" with the U.S. Patent and Trademark Office. The new name immediately drew comparisons with the Ken Finkleman-created Canadian comedy series of the same name that aired on CBC and public television stations in the U.S. The series' name was confirmed as The Newsroom in an HBO promo released on December 21, 2011, previewing its programs for 2012.

Writing in Maclean's, Jaime Weinman said the choice of name was "a bit of a grimly amusing reminder that the U.S. TV industry doesn't take Canada very seriously ... 'The Newsroom' is often considered the greatest show Canada has ever produced, but a U.S. network feels no need to fear unflattering comparisons: assuming they've heard of the show, they probably think most people in the States have not heard of it."

=== Casting ===
Jeff Daniels was cast in the lead role in March 2011. Alison Pill and Olivia Munn reportedly entered negotiations to star in April 2011. The fictional executive producer role was initially offered to Marisa Tomei, but negotiations fell through. Tomei was replaced by Emily Mortimer in May 2011. Sam Waterston also joined the project in May. John Gallagher, Jr., Thomas Sadoski, Josh Pence, and Dev Patel were added to the cast in June 2011.

New York magazine reported that Sorkin had planned for MSNBC host Chris Matthews and Andrew Breitbart to appear in a roundtable debate scene in the pilot. However, the idea was shot down by MSNBC purportedly because the network was displeased with the corporate culture portrayal of cable news and skewering of left-leaning media in the show's script.

=== Filming ===
The Newsroom's set is located in Sunset Gower Studios, Hollywood, California. Production began in the fall of 2011. The schedule called for each episode – comprising a dialogue-dense script – to be filmed in nine days, as opposed to six to seven days for broadcast network TV series. The pilot took 18 days of filming. On the third day of filming they filmed Will McAvoy's speech at Northwestern University which Sorkin added only two weeks before.

== Reception ==
Critical reaction to the episode was mixed. Tim Goodman of The Hollywood Reporter writes that how viewers respond to the show "has everything to do with whether you like his style. Because ... Sorkin is always true to himself and doesn't try to cover his tendencies or be embarrassed by them." Alessandra Stanley of The New York Times commented that "at its best ... The Newsroom has a wit, sophistication and manic energy.... But at its worst, the show chokes on its own sanctimony." Maureen Ryan of The Huffington Post called the preview episodes "a dramatically inert, infuriating mess, one that wastes a fine cast to no demonstrable purpose, unless you consider giving Sorkin yet another platform in which to Set the People Straight is a worthwhile purpose." Time's James Poniewozik criticized the show for being "smug" and "intellectually self-serving," with "Aaron Sorkin writing one argument after another for himself to win." Los Angeles Times critic Mary McNamara said the show's drama is "weighted too heavily toward sermonizing diatribes."

Reviews by newscasters were mixed as well. Jake Tapper of ABC News criticized Sorkin's partisanship: "they extol the Fourth Estate's democratic duty, but they believe that responsibility consists mostly of criticizing Republicans." Dave Marash was not convinced that the show portrays the news industry accurately. Former CBS Evening News anchor Dan Rather gave a favorable review, saying the show "has the potential to become a classic."

Jeff Daniels won the Primetime Emmy Award for Outstanding Lead Actor in a Drama Series for his performance in this episode at the 65th Primetime Emmy Awards.
