= Joshua Marston =

American screenwriter and film director (born 1968)

- Marston in 2026
- Born: August 13, 1968 (age 58); Los Angeles County, California, U.S.
- Occupations: screenwriter, film director

Joshua Jacob Marston (born August 13, 1968) is an American screenwriter and film director best known for the film Maria Full of Grace.

Born in Los Angeles County, California, he graduated from Beverly Hills High School. Marston worked in Paris as an intern for Life, then for ABC News during the Gulf War. He returned to the United States and earned a master's degree in Political Science from University of Chicago in 1994 before earning a Master of Fine Arts in film at New York University.

Marston also directed an episode of Six Feet Under, and Episode 7 of The Newsroom in 2012. Marston directed a segment of the collective film New York, I Love You.

His 2011 film The Forgiveness of Blood premiered in competition at the 61st Berlin International Film Festival and competed for the Golden Bear. Along with Andamion Murataj, Marston won the Silver Bear for Best Script.

In 2014, he received a Guggenheim Fellowship in Film-Video.

In 2016, Marston made his English-language debut on Complete Unknown starring Rachel Weisz and Michael Shannon, which had its world premiere at the 2016 Sundance Film Festival. The film was released on August 26, 2016, by Amazon Studios & IFC Films. In 2018, his film Come Sunday was released on Netflix.
