= Janine Jackowski =

German film producer (born 1976 or 1977)

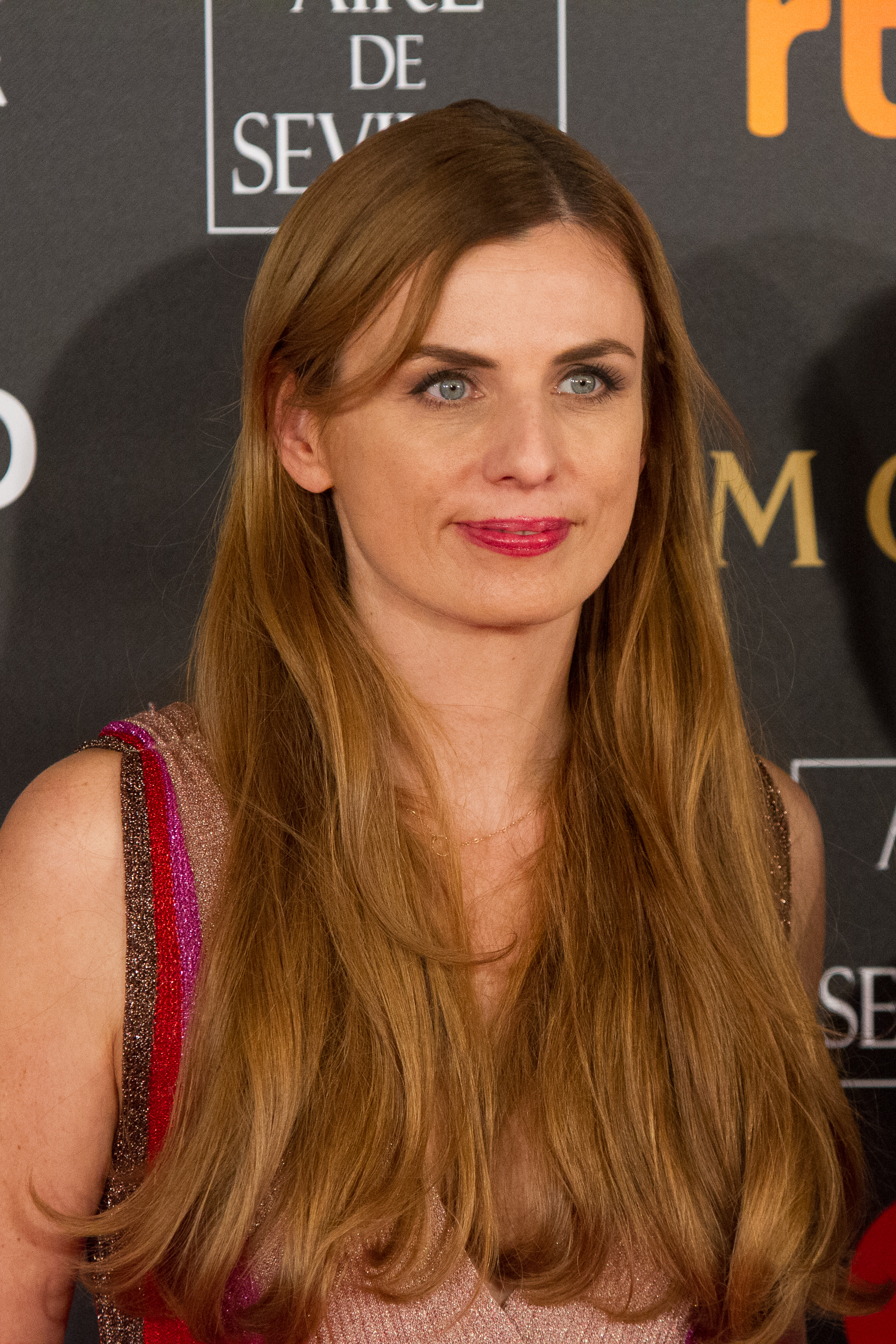
- Jackowski at the 2018 Goya Awards
- Born: 1976 or 1977 (age 49–50); Frechen, Germany
- Education: University of Television and Film Munich
- Occupation: Film producer
- Years active: 1999–present
- Children: 2

Janine Jackowski (born 1976 or 1977) is a German film producer. Her credits include Maren Ade's Toni Erdmann (2016), Pablo Larraín's Spencer (2021), and Valeska Grisebach's The Dreamed Adventure (2026).

== Biography ==
Jackowski attended the University of Television and Film Munich, where she met director Maren Ade. Her first job was working as a production assistant on Die Harald Schmidt Show. She and Ade co-founded Komplizen Film in 1999. In 2019, she was invited to join the Academy of Motion Picture Arts and Sciences.

=== Personal life ===
Jackowski is based in Berlin. She has two children.

== Filmography ==
=== Film ===
Year	Title	Director	Notes	Ref.
2003	The Forest for the Trees	Maren Ade	Producer	
2005	3° kälter	Florian Hoffmeister	Producer	
2007	Hotel Very Welcome	Sonja Heiss	Producer	
2008	Du Bruit Dans La Tête	Vincent Pluss	Co-producer	
2009	Everyone Else	Maren Ade	Producer	
2011	Sleeping Sickness	Ulrich Köhler	Producer	
2012	Tabu	Miguel Gomes	Co-producer	
2012	Die Lebenden	Barbara Albert	Co-producer	
2013	Tanta agua	Ana Guevara, Leticia Jorge	Co-producer	
2014	Superegos	Benjamin Heisenberg	Producer	
2014	Love Island	Jasmila Žbanić	Co-producer	
2014	Lügen Und Andere Wahrheiten	Vanessa Jopp	Producer	
2015	Hedi Schneider Is Stuck	Sonja Heiss	Producer	
2015	Arabian Nights	Miguel Gomes	Co-producer	
2016	Toni Erdmann	Maren Ade	Producer	
2016	Scarred Hearts	Radu Jude	Co-producer	
2017	A Fantastic Woman	Sebastián Lelio	Co-producer	
2017	Western	Valeska Grisebach	Producer	
2018	In My Room	Ulrich Köhler	Co-producer	
2018	I Do Not Care If We Go Down in History as Barbarians	Radu Jude	Co-producer	
2018	Akasha	Hajooj Kuka	Co-producer	
2019	A Tale of Three Sisters	Emin Alper	Co-producer	
2019	O Beautiful Night	Xaver Böhm	Producer	
2019	Synonyms	Nadav Lapid	Co-producer	
2019	Roads	Sebastian Schipper	Co-producer	
2019	The Whistlers	Corneliu Porumboiu	Co-producer	
2019	The Fever	Maya Da-Rin	Producer	
2019	Giraffe	Anna Sofie Hartmann	Producer	
2019	The Space Between the Lines	Vanessa Jopp	Producer	
2020	Exile	Visar Morina	Producer	
2021	Ahed's Knee	Nadav Lapid	Co-producer	
2021	The Story of My Wife	Ildikó Enyedi	Producer	
2021	Le Prince	Lisa Bierwirth	Producer	
2021	Spencer	Pablo Larraín	Producer	
2022	Gentle	László Csuja, Anna Nemes	Co-producer	
2022	A E I O U – Das schnelle Alphabet der Liebe	Nicolette Krebitz	Producer	
2022	Intet	Trine Piil Christensen, Seamus McNally	Producer	
2022	Corsage	Marie Kreutzer	Co-producer	
2022	Vous n'aurez pas ma haine	Kilian Riedhof	Producer	
2023	When Will It Be Again Like It Never Was Before	Sonja Heiss	Producer	
2023	About Dry Grasses	Nuri Bilge Ceylan	Co-producer	
2024	Maria	Pablo Larraín	Producer	
2025	Delicious	Nele Mueller-Stöfen	Producer	
2025	Sentimental Value	Joachim Trier	Co-producer	
2025	Yes	Nadav Lapid	Co-producer	
2026	Ach, diese Lücke, diese entsetzliche Lücke	Simon Verhoeven	Producer	
2026	Home Stories	Eva Trobisch	Co-producer	
2026	Gentle Monster	Marie Kreutzer	Co-producer	
2026	The Dreamed Adventure	Valeska Grisebach	Producer	

=== Television ===
Year	Title	Network	Notes	Ref.
2019	Skylines	Netflix	Producer; 6 episodes	
