= Taking Sides =

Taking Sides may refer to:

- Taking Sides, a novel by Gary Soto
- Taking Sides (film), a 2001 adaptation of Ronald Harwood's play, directed by István Szabó
- Taking Sides (play), a 1995 play by Ronald Harwood
