= Daniela Holtz =

German stage, television and film actor (born 1977)

- Born: 1 January 1977 (age 49); Bad Cannstatt, Stuttgart, West Germany
- Occupation: Actress

Daniela Holtz (born 1 January 1977) is a German stage, television and film actress.

== Life ==
Born in Bad Cannstatt, Stuttgart, Holtz grew up in Algeria, Bremen, Bavaria and elsewhere. After graduation she worked as a journalist, before studying acting from 1999 to 2003 at the Hochschule „Ernst-Busch“ in Berlin. Stage work in Leipzig und Berlin followed. She has worked on films under directors such as Maren Ade and Marcus H. Rosenmüller and on various television series such as Stolberg, Großstadtrevier, SOKO Wismar, Cologne P.D., Tatort and KDD – Kriminaldauerdienst. She also works as an acting and directing coach as well as a lecturer at the Hochschule Ernst Busch and in 2008-2009 graduated as a screenwriter at the Autorenschule Hamburg Berlin. Her more recent role was in Victoria as Queen Victoria's childhood governess and close companion, Baroness Lezhen.

== Partial filmography ==
- 2003: The Forest for the Trees [Der Wald vor lauter Bäumen] (Director: Maren Ade)
- 2008: Der Verdacht (short film; Director: Felix Hassenfratz)
- 2008: Tatort – Der Kormorankrieg
- 2009: Schwester Ines (Kurzfilm; Director: Christiane Lilge)
- 2009: The Dispensables (Director: Andreas Arnstedt)
- 2009: Tatort: Das Gespenst
- 2010: Folge mir (Director: Johannes Hammel)
- 2011: Unten Mitte Kinn (Director: Nicolas Wackerbarth)
- 2011: Marie Brand und die letzte Fahrt (TV; Director: Marcus Weiler)
- 2011: My Life in Orange (Director: Marcus H. Rosenmüller)
- 2014: Tour de Force (Director: Christian Zübert)
- 2016: Victoria

== Theatre ==
- 2003: Onkel Wanja (Schauspiel Leipzig; Director: Markus Dietz)
- 2003: Liebelei (Schauspiel Leipzig; Director: Enrico Lübbe)
- 2003: Sterne über Mansfeld (Schauspiel Leipzig; Director: Armin Petras)
- 2004: Ein Volksfeind (Schauspiel Leipzig; Director: Antoine Uitdehaag)
- 2005: Der Kaufmann von Venedig (Deutsches Theater Berlin; Director: Tina Manik)
- 2005: Clavigo (Deutsches Theater Berlin; Director: Martin Pfaff)
- 2006: Die Feuerrote Blume (Maxim-Gorki-Theater Berlin; Kerstin Lenkrad)
- 2006: Trauer muss Elektra tragen (Schaubühne Berlin; Director: Thomas Ostermeier)
- 2006: Augusta (Schaubühne Berlin; Director: Rafael Sanchez)
- 2007: Orestes (Schauspielhaus Hamburg; Director: Alexander Krebs)
- 2009: Dies ist kein Liebeslied (Theater unterm Dach, Berlin; Director: Wenke Hardt)
