= The Story of My Wife (film) =

2021 international romantic drama film

- International promotional poster
- Hungarian: A feleségem története
- Directed by: Ildikó Enyedi
- Written by: Ildikó Enyedi
- Based on: The Story of My Wife by Milán Füst
- Produced by: Maren Ade; Mónika Mécs; Ernő Mesterházy; Jonas Dornbach; Janine Jackowski; Flaminio Zadra; Pilar Saavedra Perrotta; Stéphane Parthenay; Robin Boespflug-Vonier; András Muhi
- Starring: Léa Seydoux; Gijs Naber; Louis Garrel; Sergio Rubini; Jasmine Trinca
- Cinematography: Marcell Rév
- Edited by: Károly Szalai
- Music by: Ádám Balázs
- Production companies: Inforg-M&M Film; Komplizen Films; Palosanto Films; Pyramide Productions; Rai Cinema; WDR; Arte France Cinéma
- Distributed by: Mozinet (Hungary); Alamode Film (Germany); Pyramide Distribution (France)
- Release dates: 14 July 2021 (Cannes); 23 September 2021 (Hungary); 14 October 2021 (Germany); 12 January 2022 (France)
- Running time: 169 minutes
- Countries: Hungary; Germany; France; Italy
- Languages: English; French; Dutch; German; Italian
- Budget: €10 million

The Story of My Wife (Hungarian: A feleségem története) is a 2021 romantic drama film written and directed by Ildikó Enyedi, based on the 1942 novel of the same name by Milán Füst. It stars Léa Seydoux, Gijs Naber, Louis Garrel, Sergio Rubini and Jasmine Trinca, and follows Jakob Störr (Naber), a sea captain who indifferently chooses a wife, but quickly becomes obsessed with her.

The film had its world premiere at the main competition of the 2021 Cannes Film Festival on 14 July, where it was nominated for the Palme d'Or. It was theatrically released in Hungary by Mozinet on 23 September, in Germany by Alamode Film on 14 October, and in France by Pyramide Distribution on 12 January 2022. It received mixed reviews.

== Premise ==
Jakob Störr (Gijs Naber) is a sea captain in charge of freighters. After taking ill at sea his cook advises him to take a wife. Indifferent to the idea, Jakob informs a friend that he intends to marry and that it makes little difference who his wife is. He suggests he will marry the next woman who walks into the café. Seeing the beautiful Lizzy (Léa Seydoux) he proposes that they marry the following day and she suggests they wait a week.

Jakob and Lizzy are married and are initially quite happy with each other. Jakob leaves for months at a time and is satisfied to always have Lizzy at home waiting for him.

== Cast ==
- Léa Seydoux as Lizzy
- Gijs Naber as Jakob Störr
- Louis Garrel as Dedin
- Sergio Rubini as Kodor
- Jasmine Trinca as Viola
- Luna Wedler as Grete
- Josef Hader as Herr Lange
- Ulrich Matthes as psychiatrist
- Udo Samel as private investigator

== Production ==
Milán Füst's novel, The Story of My Wife, was one of Enyedi's favorites when she was a teenager, which led her to adapt it into a film. In February 2018, it was announced Léa Seydoux had joined the cast of the film, with Ildikó Enyedi directing from a screenplay she wrote. Monika Mécs, Maren Ade, Jonas Dornbach, Janine Jackowski, Flaminio Zadra, Pilar Saavedra Perrotta producing under their Inforg-M&M Film, Komplizen Film and Palosanto Films banners, respectively. In April 2019, it was announced Gijs Naber, Louis Garrel, Josef Hader, Sergio Rubini and Jasmine Trinca had joined the cast of the film.

The dialogue is primarily in English because in the 1920s English was the primary language in the shipping industry.

Filming began on 8 April 2019 and in Hamburg, Budapest, and Malta.

== Release ==
In February 2020, it was announced Rai Cinema, Mozinet, Pyramide Distribution and Almonde would distribute the film in Italy, Hungary, France, and Germany, respectively. But the film was delayed due to the COVID-19 pandemic in Europe.

The Story of My Wife had its world premiere at the 2021 Cannes Film Festival on 14 July. It had its North American Premiere at the 2021 Toronto International Film Festival.

It was theatrically released in Hungary by Mozinet on 23 September, in Germany by Alamode Film on 14 October, and in France by Pyramide Distribution on 12 January 2022.

== Reception ==
The Story of My Wife holds a 21% approval rating on review aggregator website Rotten Tomatoes, based on 19 reviews, with a weighted average of 4.60/10. On Metacritic, the film holds a rating of 40 out of 100, based on 5 critics, indicating "mixed or average reviews".
