= 59th Berlin International Film Festival =

2009 film festival in Berlin, Germany

- Festival poster
- Opening film: The International
- Closing film: Eden Is West
- Location: Berlin, Germany
- Founded: 1951
- Awards: Golden Bear: The Milk of Sorrow
- No. of films: 383 films
- Festival date: 5–15 February 2009
- Website: Website

Berlin International Film Festival chronology
- 60th 58th

The 59th Berlin International Film Festival was held from 5 February to 15 February 2009. The opening film of the festival was Tom Tykwer’s The International, screened out of competition. Costa-Gavras's Eden Is West served as the closing night film at the festival. The festival's jury president was the British actress Tilda Swinton.

The Golden Bear was awarded to Peruvian film The Milk of Sorrow directed by Claudia Llosa. The retrospective dedicated to the Golden Age of 70mm filmmaking from 1955 to 1970, titled 70mm – Bigger than Life was shown at the festival.

Admission for the festival was reported to be among the highest in years, and it also set a record for ticket sales, with some 270,000 tickets sold by the halfway mark, compared to 240,000 sold for the entire run of the festival the previous year. The final ticket tally was the largest in the festival's 59-year history.

== Juries ==
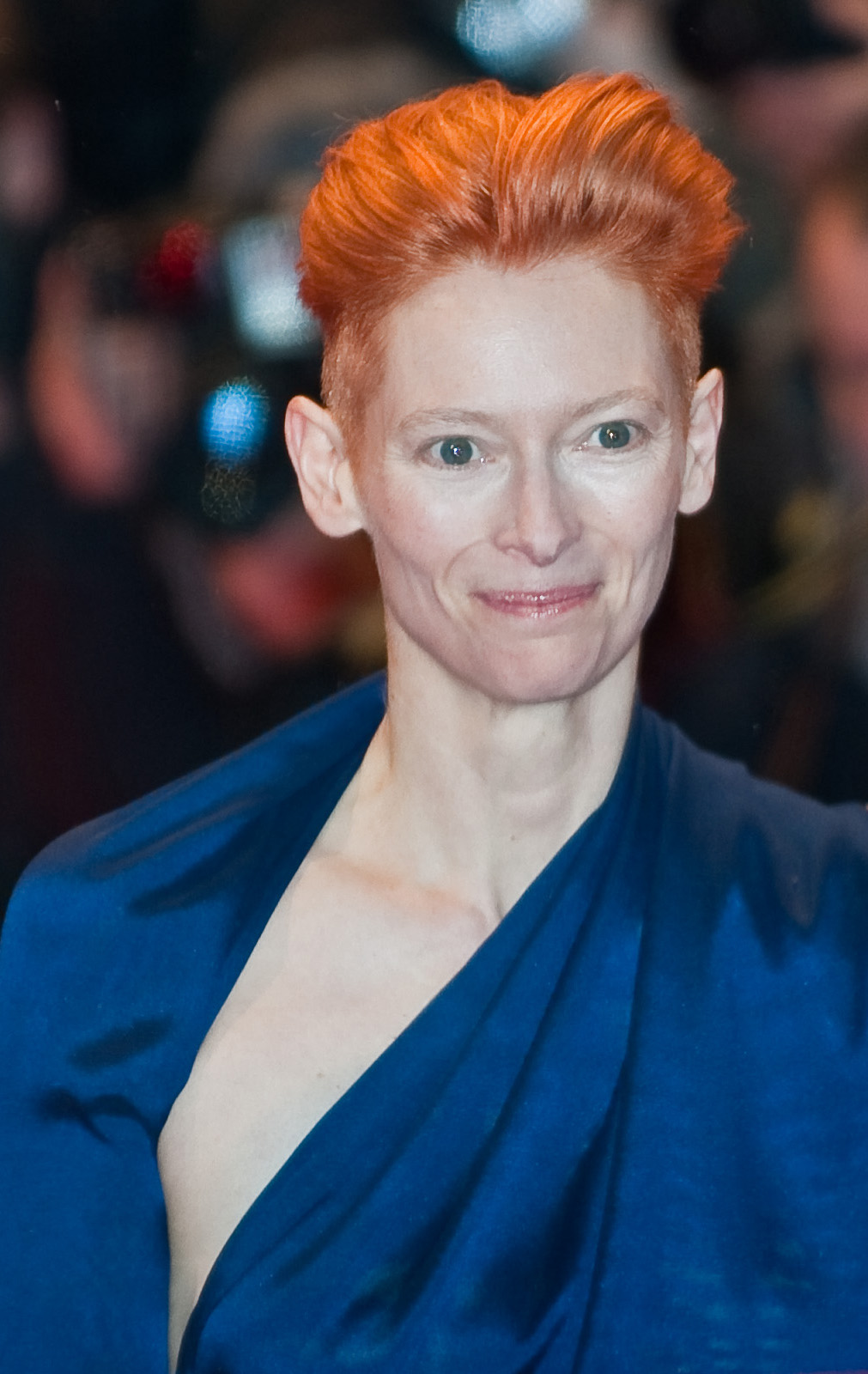
Tilda Swinton, Jury President

The following people were announced as being on the jury for the festival:

=== Main Competition ===
- Tilda Swinton, British actress - Jury President
- Isabel Coixet, Spanish filmmaker
- Gaston Kaboré, Burkinabé filmmaker
- Henning Mankell, Swedish writer
- Christoph Schlingensief, German playwright and director
- Wayne Wang, Hong Kong director, screenwriter and producer
- Alice Waters, American author

=== Best First Feature Award Jury ===
- Hannah Herzsprung, German actress
- In-Ah Lee, German producer
- Rafi Pitts, Iranian director

=== International Short Film Jury ===
- Khavn De La Cruz, Filipino director, screenwriter and producer
- Arta Dobroshi, Kosovo actress
- Lars Henrik Gass, German director of the International Short Film Festival Oberhausen

== Official Sections ==
=== Main Competition ===
The following films were selected in competition for the Golden Bear and Silver Bear awards:

| English title | Original title | Director(s) | Production Country |
|---|---|---|---|
| About Elly | درباره الی | Asghar Farhadi | Iran |
| Cheri | | Stephen Frears | United Kingdom |
| Everyone Else | Alle Anderen | Maren Ade | Germany |
| Forever Enthralled | 梅蘭芳 | Chen Kaige | China |
| Giant | Gigante | Adrián Biniez | Uruguay, Germany, Argentina |
| Happy Tears | | Mitchell Lichtenstein | United States |
| In the Electric Mist | | Bertrand Tavernier | United States |
| Katalin Varga | | Peter Strickland | Romania, United Kingdom, Hungary |
| Little Soldier | | Annette K. Olesen | Denmark |
| London River | | Rachid Bouchareb | France, United Kingdom |
| Mammoth | Mammut | Lukas Moodysson | Sweden, Germany, Denmark |
| The Messenger | | Oren Moverman | United States |
| The Milk of Sorrow | La Teta Asustada | Claudia Llosa | Peru |
| My One and Only | | Richard Loncraine | United States |
| Rage | | Sally Potter | United Kingdom, United States |
| Ricky | | François Ozon | France, Italy |
| Storm | Sturm | Hans-Christian Schmid | Germany, Denmark |
| Sweet Rush | Tatarak | Andrzej Wajda | Poland |

=== Out of Competition ===
The following films were selected for the out of competition screening at the festival:

| English title | Original title | Director(s) | Production Country |
|---|---|---|---|
| Eden Is West (closing film) | Eden à l'ouest | Costa-Gavras | France, Greece |
| The Dust of Time | Η Σκόνη του Χρόνου | Theo Angelopoulos | Greece, Germany, Italy, Russia |
| Germany 09: 13 Short Films About the State of the Nation | Deutschland 09 – 13 kurze Filme zur Lage der Nation | Fatih Akin, Tom Tykwer, Wolfgang Becker, Sylke Enders, Dominik Graf, Romuald Karmakar, Nicolette Krebitz, Isabelle Stever, Hans Steinbichler, Hans Weingartner, Christoph Hochhäusler, Dani Levy and Angela Schanelec | Germany |
| The International (opening film) | | Tom Tykwer | United States |
| Notorious | | George Tillman Jr. | United States |
| The Private Lives of Pippa Lee | | Rebecca Miller | United States |
| The Reader | The Reader | Stephen Daldry | United Kingdom, Germany |

== Official Awards ==
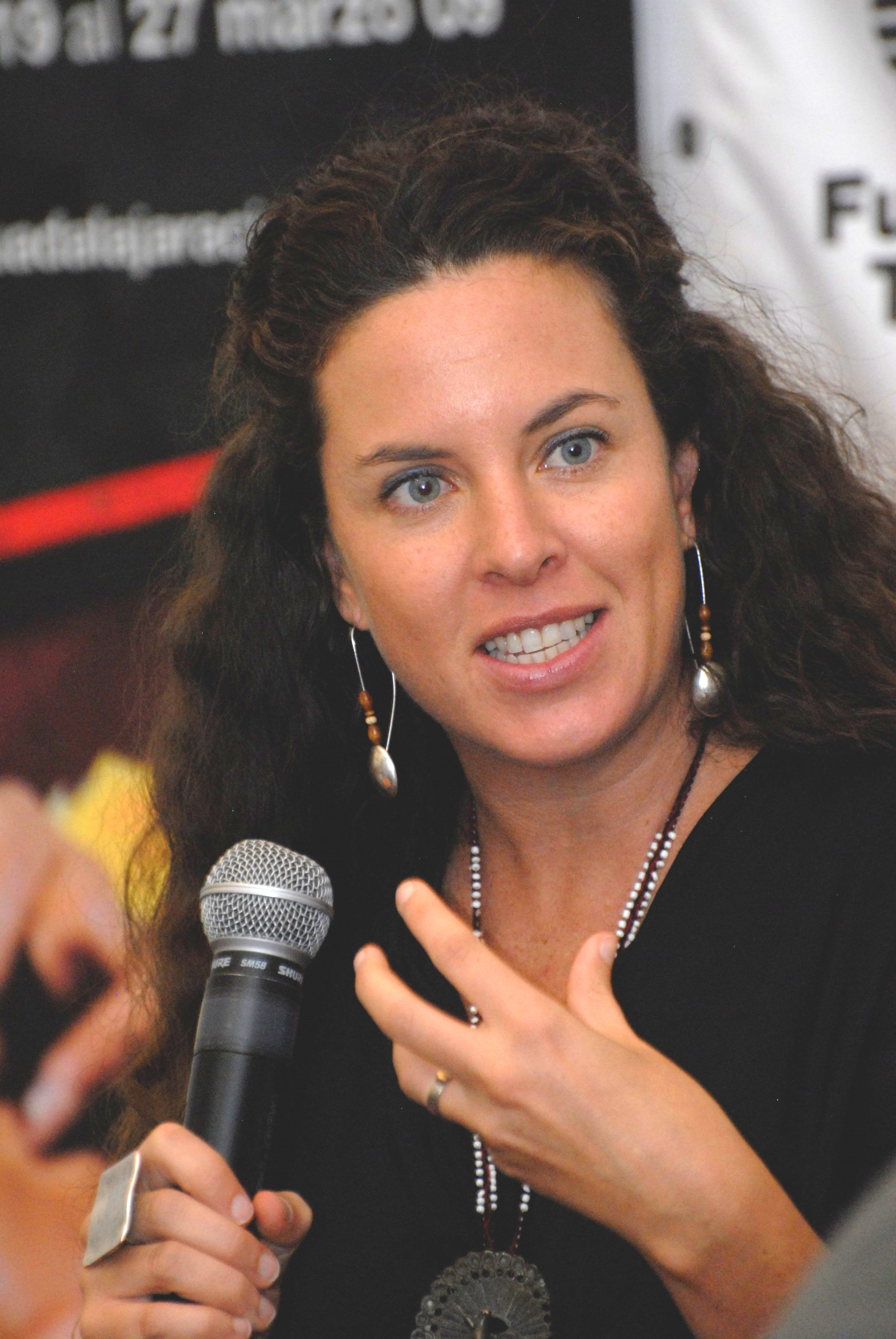
Claudia Llosa, winner of the Golden Bear at the festival

The following prizes were awarded by the Jury:

=== Main Competition ===
- Golden Bear: The Milk of Sorrow by Claudia Llosa
- Silver Bear Grand Jury Prize:
  - Adrián Biniez for Giant
  - Maren Ade for Everyone Else
- Silver Bear for Best Director: Asghar Farhadi for About Elly
- Silver Bear for Best Actor: Sotigui Kouyaté for London River
- Silver Bear for Best Actress: Birgit Minichmayr for Everyone Else
- Silver Bear for Best Screenplay: Oren Moverman and Alessandro Camon for The Messenger
- Outstanding Artistic Contribution: György Kovács, Gábor ifj. Erdélyi and Tamás Székely for Katalin Varga (sound design)
- Alfred Bauer Prize:
  - Andrzej Wajda for Tatarak
  - Adrián Biniez for Giant

== Independent Awards ==
=== FIPRESCI Award ===
- Claudia Llosa for The Milk of Sorrow
