= Maren Ade =

German film director, screenwriter, and producer

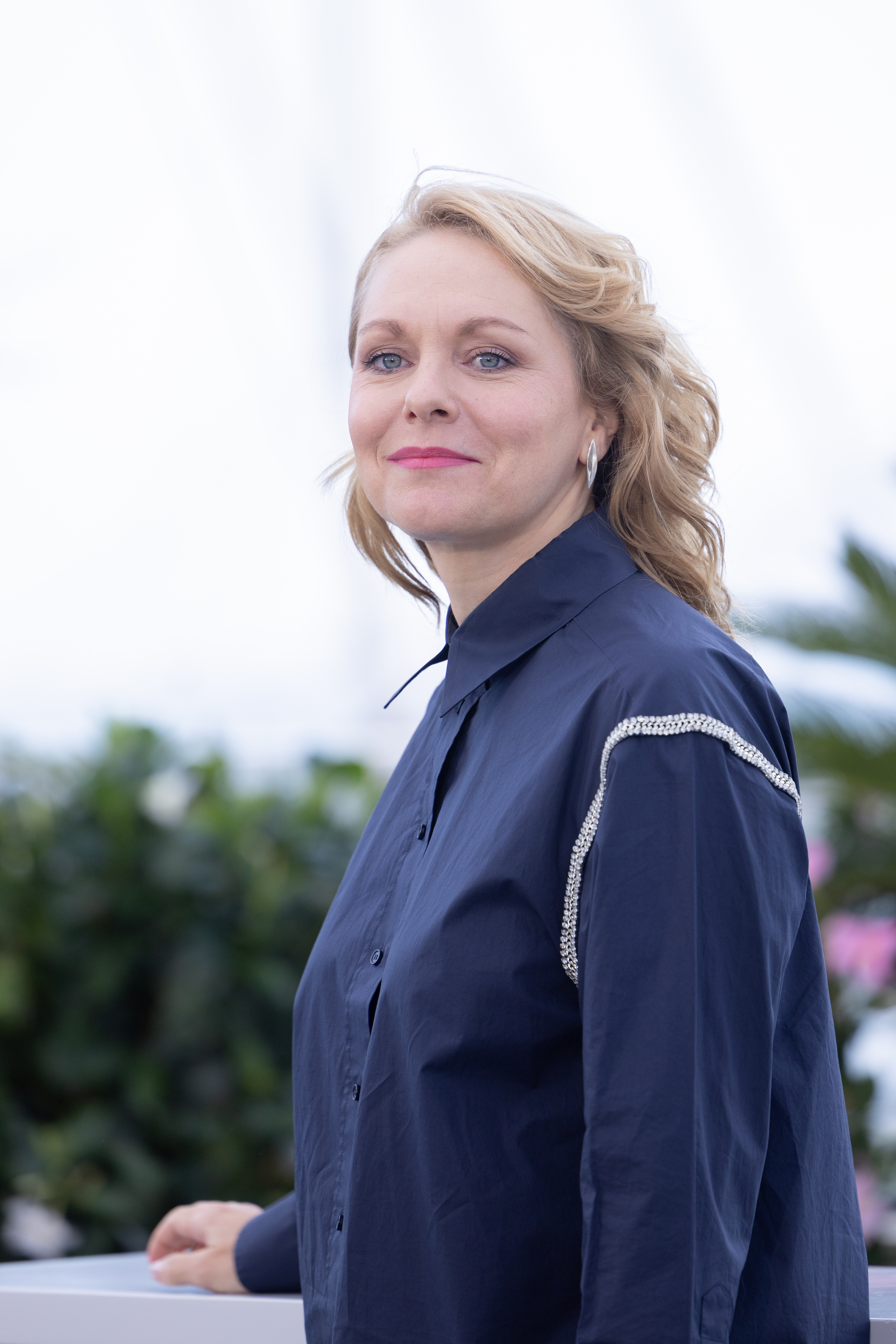
- Ade in 2025
- Born: 12 December 1976 (age 49); Karlsruhe, West Germany
- Occupations: Film director, screenwriter, producer
- Years active: 2000–present
- Spouse: Ulrich Köhler
- Children: 2

Maren Ade (German: [ˈmaːʁən ˈʔaːdə]; born 12 December 1976) is a German film director, screenwriter and producer. Ade lives in Berlin, teaching screenwriting at the Film Academy Baden-Württemberg in Ludwigsburg. Together with Janine Jackowski and Jonas Dornbach, she runs the production company Komplizen Film. She is best known for her film Toni Erdmann, which was nominated for an Academy Award.

== Early life and education ==
Ade was born in Karlsruhe, West Germany. As a teenager, she directed her first short films.

In 1998, she began studying film production and media management, and later film direction at the University of Television and Film (HFF) in Munich, which she successfully completed in 2004.

== Career ==
In 2001, Ade co-founded the film production company Komplizen Film together with Janine Jackowski, a fellow graduate from HFF. It was with Komplizen Film that she produced her final student film The Forest for the Trees at HFF in 2003. Among other honors, the film received the Special Jury Award at the Sundance Film Festival in 2005. The Forest for the Trees was screened at a large number of international festivals.

In 2009, her second film Everyone Else celebrated its world premiere in the Official Competition section of the Berlin International Film Festival, where it received the Silver Bear for Best Film (Jury Grand Prix) and the Best Actress Silver Bear for Birgit Minichmayr. Everyone Else was released in theatres in over 18 countries.

In 2012, Ade announced she would be writing and directing a film called Toni Erdmann about a man who begins to play pranks on his adult daughter after he finds she has become too serious. The film debuted In Competition at the 2016 Cannes Film Festival, the first German film to debut there in 10 years. The film won the top prize at the European Film Awards (Best European Film), thus making Ade the first woman to direct a movie that won the top prize at those awards.

Ade served on the jury of the 2017 Cannes Film Festival, chaired by Pedro Almodóvar. At the 2025 Cannes Film Festival, she presided over the festival's short film competition jury, as well as the jury for the La Cinef lineup of student films.

== Personal life ==
Ade lives with director Ulrich Köhler and their two children in Berlin.

In December 2023, alongside 50 other filmmakers, Ade signed an open letter published in Libération demanding a ceasefire and an end to the killing of civilians amid the 2023 Israeli invasion of the Gaza Strip, and for a humanitarian corridor into Gaza to be established for humanitarian aid, and the release of hostages.

== Filmography ==
=== Feature films ===
Year	English Title	Original Title	Notes
2003	The Forest for the Trees	Der Wald vor lauter Bäumen	
2009	Everyone Else	Alle anderen	
2016	Toni Erdmann		
TBA	The Magic Word		In production

=== Short films ===
- 2000: Level 9
- 2001: Vegas

=== Only producer ===
Year	English Title	Original Title	Director(s)	Notes
2002	Karma Cowboy		Sonja Heiss and Vanessa van Houten	Producer
2006	Hotel Very Welcome		Sonja Heiss	Producer
2011	Sleeping Sickness	Schlafkrankheit	Ulrich Köhler	Producer
2012	Tabu		Miguel Gomes	Co-producer
2012	The Dead and the Living	Die Lebenden	Barbara Albert	Co-producer
2013		Tanta Agua	Ana Guevara and Leticia Jorge	Co-producer
2013	Redemption		Miguel Gomes	Co-producer
2014	Love Island		Jasmila Žbanić	Co-producer
2014	Superegos	Über-Ich und Du	Benjamin Heisenberg	Producer
2015	Hedi Schneider Is Stuck	Hedi Schneider steckt fest	Sonja Heiss	Producer
2015	Arabian Nights	As Mil e uma Noites	Miguel Gomes	Co-producer
2017	Western		Valeska Grisebach	Producer
2021	The Story of My Wife	A feleségem története	Ildikó Enyedi	Producer
2021	Spencer		Pablo Larraín	Producer
2025	Delicious		Nele Mueller-Stöfen	Producer
2025	Sentimental Value	Affeksjonsverdi	Joachim Trier	Co-producer
2026	The Dreamed Adventure	Das Geträumte Abenteuer	Valeska Grisebach	Producer

== Accolades ==
- 2005: Special Jury Award, Sundance Film Festival for The Forest for the Trees
- 2005: Best Feature Film - Grand Prize, IndieLisboa - International Independent Film Festival for The Forest for the Trees
- 2005: Best Film, nomination for the German Film Award for The Forest for the Trees
- 2005: Best Feature Film, Cine Jove Valencia Film Festival for The Forest for the Trees
- 2005: Best Actress: Eva Löbau, Buenos Aires Independent Film Festival for The Forest for the Trees
- 2009: Silver Bear – Jury Grand Prix, Berlinale, for Everyone Else
- 2009: Silver Bear– Best Actress for Birgit Minichmayr, Berlinale, for Everyone Else
- 2010: Nominated for Best Film, Best Direction and Best Female Lead for Birgit Minichmayr, German Film Award for Everyone Else
- 2010: Best Direction and FIPRESCI Critics' Award, Buenos Aires Festival of Independent Cinema for Everyone Else
- 2010: Main Prize, International Women's Film Festival Dortmund for Everyone Else
- 2010: Best Actor for Lars Eidinger, Love Is Folly International Film Festival for Everyone Else
- 2010: Best Actress for Birgit Minichmayr, Ourense Film Festival for Everyone Else
- 2014: Berlin Art Prize in the category Film and Media Art
- 2015: DEFA Foundation Award for Outstanding Performance in German Film for Komplizen Film
- 2016: Academy Award nomination, Best Foreign Film, for "Toni Erdmann"
