= The Story of My Wife =

Novel by Milán Füst

The Story of My Wife: The Reminiscences of Captain Storr is a Hungarian novel by Milán Füst. First published in Hungary in 1946, it was eventually translated into English by Ivan Sanders in 1988.

The book is written as if it is a memoir and tells the story of captain Jacob Storr, a Dutch man who suspects his wife of infidelity.

== Plot ==
Storr, a Dutch naval captain, tells the story of his unhappy marriage to his wife, Lizzy, a Frenchwoman he married after a friend dared him to marry the next woman who walked into the café they were sitting in.

== Adaptations ==
In 2018, Ildikó Enyedi announced her next film would be an English language adaptation of The Story of My Wife, starring Léa Seydoux and Gijs Naber. The film premiered at the 2021 Cannes Film Festival.
