= The Blood Countess =

The Blood Countess may refer to:

- A nickname for Elizabeth Báthory
- The Blood Countess (film), a 2026 film about her
