= György Enyedi =

György Enyedi may refer to:

- György Enyedi (Unitarian) (1555–1597), Hungarian Unitarian bishop
- György Enyedi (geographer) (1930–2012), Hungarian economist and geographer
