= The Dreamed Adventure =

2026 drama film by Valeska Grisebach

- German promotional poster
- German: Das Geträumte Abenteuer
- Bulgarian: Мечтаното Приключение
- Directed by: Valeska Grisebach
- Written by: Valeska Grisebach; Lisa Bierwirth
- Produced by: Maren Ade; Jonas Dornbach; Janine Jackowski
- Starring: Yana Radeva; Syuleyman Letifov
- Cinematography: Bernhard Keller
- Edited by: Bettina Böhler
- Production companies: Komplizen Film; Panama Film; Miramar Film; Kasak Productions
- Distributed by: Haut et Court (France); Piffl (Germany)
- Release dates: 22 May 2026 (Cannes); 15 July 2026 (France)
- Running time: 167 minutes
- Countries: Germany; France; Bulgaria; Austria
- Language: Bulgarian

The Dreamed Adventure (German: Das Geträumte Abenteuer, Bulgarian: Мечтаното Приключение, romanized: Mechtanoto Priklyuchenie) is a 2026 drama film written and directed by Valeska Grisebach. A co-production of Germany, France, Bulgaria, and Austria, it stars Syuleyman Letifov and Yana Radeva.

The film had its world premiere in the main competition of the 2026 Cannes Film Festival on 22 May, where it won the Jury Prize. It was selected as the Bulgarian entry for the Best International Feature Film at the 99th Academy Awards.

== Synopsis ==
On the border between Bulgaria, Greece, and Turkey, a woman agrees to help an old acquaintance with an illegal mission.

== Cast ==
- Yana Radeva as Veska
- Syuleyman Letifov as Said
- Stoicho Kostadinov
- Nikolay Shekerdjiev
- Denislava Yordanova
- Tiana Georgieva

== Production ==
The Dreamed Adventure is being produced by Jonas Dornbach, Janine Jackowski and Maren Ade for Komplizen Film, in co-production with Jean Christophe Reymond for France’s Kazak Productions, Mila Voinikova for Bulgaria’s Miramar Film, and Lixi Frank and David Bohun for Austria’s Panama Film, as well as Grisebach, Luise Hauschild and Mariam Shatberashvili for New Matter Films, Arte France Cinéma and ZDF/Arte, in collaboration with Arte France. The film was also supported by Der Beauftragte der Bundesregierung für Kultur und Medien (BKM), Medienboard Berlin-Brandenburg, FFA, DFF, Mitteldeutsche Medienförderung, Creative Europe – MEDIA, Aide aux cinémas du monde, the CNC, the Institut français, the Bulgarian National Film Center, the Österreichisches Filminstitut and ÖFI+, and Filmfonds Wien.

Grisebach first received funding in 2022 from the German-French Funding Commission.

== Release ==
Following the announcement that the film would compete for the Palme d'Or at the 2026 Cannes Film Festival, The Match Factory boarded the film to handle the distribution sales. Haut et Court is scheduled to release theatrically the film in France on 15 July 2026. Piffl will do so in Germany in late 2026. The Match Factory close deals for the territories of the Baltic Countries (A-One Film), Switzerland (Trigon Film), Greece (Ama Films), and Indonesia (PT Falcon). Janus Films acquired distribution rights for the territory of North America.

It was screened in the Kinoscope section of the 32nd Sarajevo Film Festival in August 2026. Subsequently it had its North American premiere in the Centrepiece program at the 2026 Toronto International Film Festival on 13 September 2026. It was also selected for the Main Slate of the 2026 New York Film Festival, and the International Competition program at the 62nd Chicago International Film Festival where it won the festival's top prize, the Gold Hugo.

The film will be screened for Japanese Premiere on 26 October 2026 in the World Focus section of the 39th Tokyo International Film Festival.

== Reception ==
=== Critical response ===
On review aggregator Rotten Tomatoes, the film holds an approval rating of 95% based on 21 reviews, with an average rating of 6.9/10. On Metacritic, the film has a weighted average score of 80 out of 100, based on 11 critics, indicating "generally favorable reviews".

=== Accolades ===
The Dreamed Adventure selected as the Bulgarian entry for the Best International Feature Film at the 99th Academy Awards by 14 September 2026. It also was one of eleven shortlisted by the German Films to be German entry.

Award	Date of ceremony	Category	Recipient(s)	Result	Ref.
Cannes Film Festival	23 May 2026	Palme d'Or	Valeska Grisebach	Nominated	
Cannes Film Festival	23 May 2026	Jury Prize	Valeska Grisebach	Won	
Sydney Film Festival	14 June 2026	Sydney Film Prize	Valeska Grisebach	Nominated	
Chicago International Film Festival	23 October 2026	Gold Hugo	Valeska Grisebach	Won	
Chicago International Film Festival	23 October 2026	Best Lead Performance	Yana Radeva	Won	

== See also ==
- List of submissions to the 99th Academy Awards for Best International Feature Film
- List of Bulgarian submissions for the Academy Award for Best International Feature Film
