= Be My Star =

2001 Austrian-German drama film

- German: Mein Stern
- Directed by: Valeska Grisebach
- Written by: Valeska Grisebach
- Produced by: Valeska Grisebach
- Starring: Nicole Gläser; Christopher Schöps
- Cinematography: Bernhard Keller
- Edited by: Anja Salomonowitz
- Production company: Vienna Film Academy
- Distributed by: Peripher Filmverleih
- Release date: 15 February 2001 (Berlin)
- Running time: 65 minutes
- Countries: Austria; Germany
- Language: German

Be My Star (German: Mein Stern) is an Austrian-German drama film, directed by Valeska Grisebach and released in 2001. The film stars Nicole Gläser as Nicole, a teenage girl in Berlin who is beginning to establish her independence by entering a relationship with Christopher (Christopher Schöps), with whom she begins to imitate the rituals of adult relationships by having a mock wedding and acting as a married couple when their parents aren't around.

The cast also includes Monique Gläser and Jeanine Gläser as Nicole's sisters and Christina Sandke as their mother, as well as Marcel Eichelberger, Anika Jahn, Nicole Lehmann, Sebastian Rinka, Paul Skibbe, Tim Wolf and Daniel Zühlke in supporting roles.

== Production ==
Made as Grisebach's student film project in her studies at the Vienna Film Academy, the film's cast consisted entirely of non-professional actors cast in the Mitte borough of Berlin.

== Distribution ==
The film premiered at the 51st Berlin International Film Festival.

It was later screened at the 2001 Toronto International Film Festival, where it received an honorable mention from the FIPRESCI Prize jury, and at the Torino Film Festival, where it won the Prize of the City of Torino.
