= Longing (2006 film) =

2006 film by Valeska Grisebach

- Directed by: Valeska Grisebach
- Starring: Andreas Müller; Ilka Welz
- Release date: 15 February 2006 (BIFF)
- Running time: 1h 28min
- Country: Germany
- Language: German

Longing (German: Sehnsucht) is a 2006 German drama film directed by Valeska Grisebach. Starring nonprofessional actors, it tells the story of a love affair between a locksmith and a waitress.

== Plot ==
Markus is a self-contained young locksmith and volunteer firefighter in the rural town where he lives happily with his wife Ella, who works as a domestic, but without children. One day he is first on the scene at a road accident, the first time he has had to deal with both a serious injury and a corpse. Worse, he learns that it was not an accident but a suicide attempt by a man desperately unhappy in love.

Drinking too much while away on a firefighting course, he wakes up in the bed of the unmarried Rose, one of the waitresses. Despite his longstanding affection for Ella, he can't resist visits to Rose. When he summons up the courage to tell her he will not be coming again, she falls from the balcony. Badly injured but not fatally, she is hospitalised and he is the subject of a police enquiry. The news gets back to his home town, upon which Ella leaves the marital home and refuses to return. In despair Markus shoots himself, but the wound is not fatal and he is hospitalised.

In the playground some children are discussing what happened once Markus was released from hospital: which woman did he go back to, if she would have him?

== Cast ==
- Andreas Müller as Markus Koplin
- Ilka Welz as Ella Koplin
- Anett Dornbusch as Rose Kuchenbecker
