= Simon, the Magician =

1999 film by Ildikó Enyedi

Simon, the Magician (Hungarian: Simon mágus) is a Hungarian-French film written & directed by Ildikó Enyedi. The film premiered at the 1999 Locarno Festival in competition where it won the Don Quixote Award - Special Mention.

The film was released on DVD in 2002.

== Plot ==
The film is a modern version of the apocryphal story about the rivalry between Simon Magus and the Apostle Peter. Simon, a magician and clairvoyant, travels from Budapest to Paris to help the French police solve a murder. In Paris, he meets his rival, the popular illusionist Peter, who is planning a dangerous experiment and invites Simon to take part in it; the two are to be buried for 3 days to prove their ability in a Christlike fashion while the act is broadcast on French TV.
