= Birgit Minichmayr =

Austrian actress (born 1977)

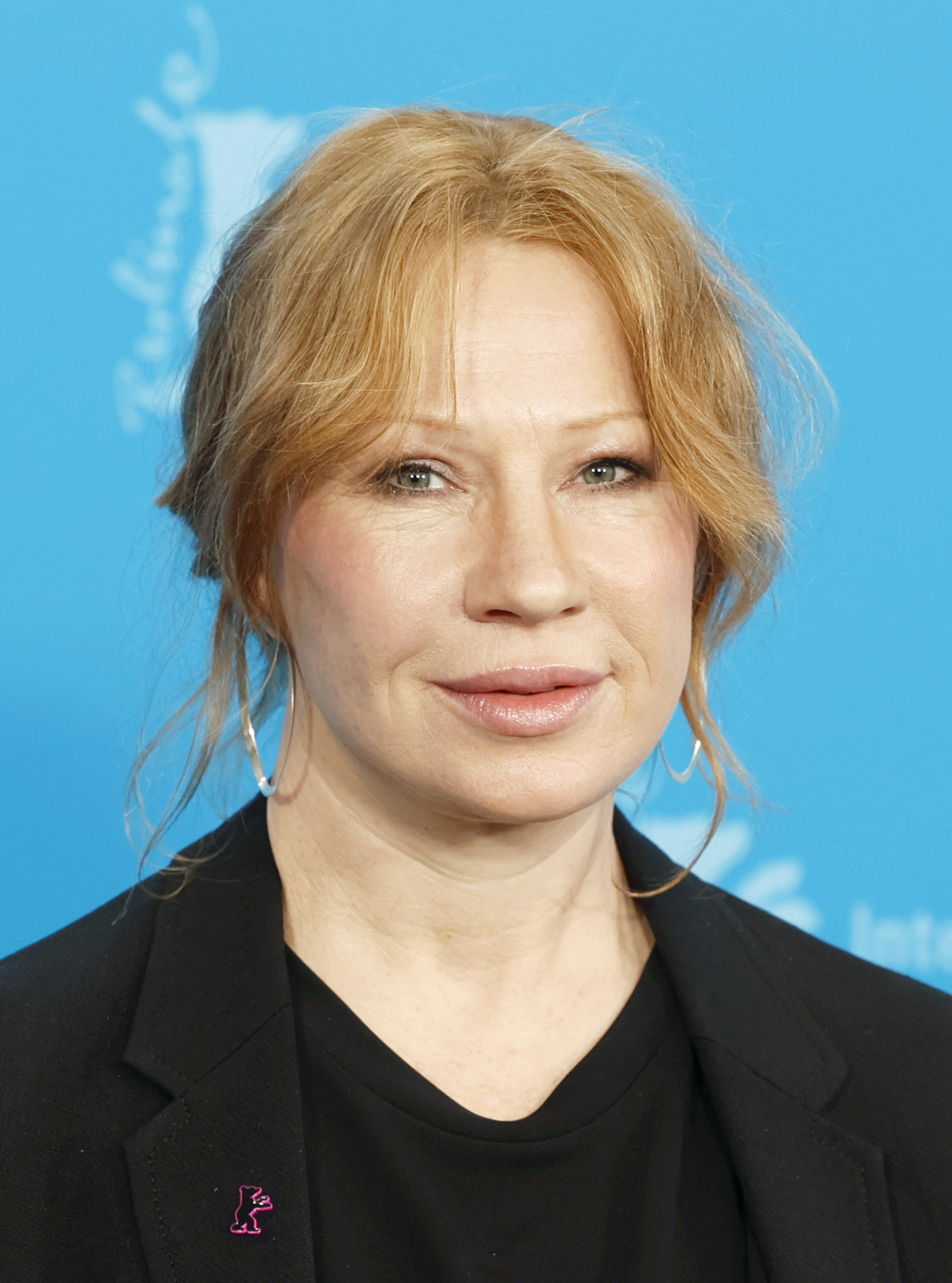
- Minichmayr in 2026
- Born: 3 April 1977 (age 49); Linz, Austria
- Occupation: Actress

Birgit Minichmayr (born 3 April 1977) is an Austrian actress. She studied drama at the Max Reinhardt Seminar in Vienna. For her work in Maren Ade's film Everyone Else she won Silver Bear for Best Actress at 59th Berlin International Film Festival. She is the only Austrian actress to win this award in history of the festival and the first Austrian actress to win best actress award at a major European film festival (Cannes, Venice, Berlin) since 1956. She worked with several major European directors including Michael Haneke, Tom Tykwer and Jessica Hausner.

== Career ==
Minichmayr had her first break with the Burgtheater in Vienna, where she appeared in numerous plays, including Der Reigen by Arthur Schnitzler (staged by Sven-Eric Bechtolf), Troilus and Cressida by William Shakespeare (staging by Declan Donnellan) and Der Färber und sein Zwillingsbruder by Johann Nestroy (staged by Karlheinz Hackl). She made her cinema debut in 2000 as Barbara Brecht in Jan Schütte's Abschied, playing alongside Josef Bierbichler and Monica Bleibtreu. In 2000, Minichmayr appeared in Peter Sämann's television thriller (in the Tatort series), "Böses Blut". She was awarded the Austrian Nestroy Prize for "Best Young Talent" in 2000. In 2006 she played Mizzi Kasper, one of the lovers from Crownprince Rudolf in the movie Kronprinz Rudolfs letzte Liebe. A year later, Minichmayr played the fool in Luc Bondy's acclaimed staging of Shakespeare's King Lear, always at the Burgtheater.

Minichmayr currently lives in Munich and Vienna. She speaks English and has acted in several international and English language productions. Among the directors she worked with were István Szabó, Götz Spielmann, Tom Tykwer, Oliver Hirschbiegel, Robert Dornhelm, and Doris Dörrie. She is also an accomplished vocalist, and has been recorded several times, though she has always made acting her primary focus.

At the 59th Berlin International Film Festival 2009 Minichmayr was awarded the Silver Bear for Best Actress for her performance in Maren Ade's Alle Anderen (Everyone Else).

== Filmography ==
Date	Film	Role	Director	Notes
2000	Abschied	Barbara Brecht	Jan Schütte	
2000	Tatort – Böses Blut	Kathi	Peter Sämann	TV film – Awarded Nestroy Prize for Best Young Talent
2001	Taking Sides	Emmi Straube	István Szabó	
2001	Spiel im Morgengrauen	Steffi	Götz Spielmann	TV film
2002	Learning to Lie	Tina	Hendrik Handloeghten	
2004	Hotel	Petra	Jessica Hausner	
2004	Downfall	Gerda Christian	Oliver Hirschbiegel	
2004	Spiele Leben	Tanja	Antonin Svoboda	
2004	Daniel Käfer – Die Villen der Frau Hürsch	Mirz Schlömmer	Julian Pölsner	TV film
2005	Perfume: The Story of a Murderer	Grenouille's Mother	Tom Tykwer	
2005	Fallen	Brigitte	Barbara Albert	
2006	Krankheit der Jugend		Students of Michael Haneke	
2006	The Crown Prince	Mizzi Kasper	Robert Dornhelm	TV film
2006	Polizeiruf 110 – Kellers Kind	Aglaia	Titus Selge	TV film
2007	Midsummer Madness	Maja	Alexander Hahn	
2008	Kirschblüten – Hanami	Karolin Angermeier	Doris Dörrie	
2009	Der Knochenmann	Birgit	Wolfgang Murnberger	
2009	The White Ribbon	Frieda	Michael Haneke	
2009	Everyone Else	Gitti	Maren Ade	
2012	A Deal with Adele	Adele Spitzeder	Xaver Schwarzenberger	TV film
2012	Mercy	Maria	Matthias Glasner	
2014	Madame Nobel	Bertha von Suttner	Urs Egger	TV film
2015	Jack	Marlies Haum	Elisabeth Scharang	
2017	Animals	Anna	Greg Zglinski	
2019	The Goldfish	Magda Grabowski	Alireza Golafshan	
2020	My Wonderful Wanda	Sophie	Bettina Oberli	
2024	Andrea Gets a Divorce	Andrea	Josef Hader	
2024	Sleeping with a Tiger	Maria Lassnig	Anja Salomonowitz	
2026	The Blood Countess	Hermine	Ulrike Ottinger	
2026	Everytime	Ella	Sandra Wollner	

== Awards ==
- 2000: Nestroy Prize for Best Young Talent
- 2004/2009: Nestroy Prize for Best Actress
- 2009: 59th Berlin International Film Festival, Best Actress for Everyone Else
- 2010: German Film Awards, Nomination Best Actress for Everyone Else
- 2015: Blow-Up International Arthouse Film Festival, Nomination for Best Actress – Monica Vitti Award
