= Delicious (2025 film) =

2025 German thriller film

- Promotional poster
- Directed by: Nele Mueller-Stöfen
- Screenplay by: Nele Mueller-Stöfen
- Produced by: Janine Jackowski; Jonas Dornbach; Maren Ade
- Starring: Valerie Pachner; Fahri Yardım; Carla Díaz; Naila Schuberth
- Cinematography: Frank Griebe
- Edited by: Andreas Wodraschke
- Music by: Volker Bertelmann; Ben Winkler
- Production companies: Cactus Films; Komplizen Film
- Distributed by: Netflix
- Release dates: 18 February 2025 (Berlinale); 7 March 2025 (Netflix)
- Running time: 102 minutes
- Country: Germany
- Languages: German; English

Delicious is a 2025 German horror thriller sociopolitical drama film written and directed by Nele Mueller-Stöfen in her directorial debut. The film follows a wealthy German family who hires a young woman as a domestic helper during their summer vacation in Provence, after which the entire family's life gradually changes, with dramatic consequences.

The film selected in Panorama 2025 had its premiere at the 75th Berlin International Film Festival on 18 February 2025. It was released worldwide for streaming on Netflix on 7 March 2025.

== Synopsis ==
A German family's idyllic summer at their French villa in Provence unravels after they accidentally hit a young woman on a country road and take her in. Initially appearing helpful, each family member soon reveals their own hidden motives, seeking something different from the woman. This mistake leads to unforeseen consequences that ultimately transform the entire family's lives.

== Cast ==
- Valerie Pachner as Esther
- Fahri Yardım as John
- Carla Díaz as Teodora
- Naila Schuberth as Alba
- Caspar Hoffmann as Philipp
- Julien de Saint Jean as Lucien
- Sina Martens as Cora
- Johann von Bülow as Aki
- Nina Zem as Estelle
- Miveck Packa as Prince
- Tom Rey as Bojan
- Mélodie Casta as Amber
- Joep Paddenburg as Erik

== Production ==
Principal photography began in 2023 on locations in France - Avignon. Filming ended on 24 November 2023 in locations in France - Provence-Alpes-Côte d'Azur. The film is a production of Komplizen Film for Netflix.

== Release ==
Delicious had its World premiere in the Panorama section of the 75th Berlin International Film Festival on 18 February 2025.

The film was released worldwide for streaming on Netflix on 7 March 2025.

== Accolades ==
Award	Date	Category	Recipient	Result	Ref.
Berlin International Film Festival	23 February 2025	Panorama Audience Award for Best Feature Film	Nele Mueller-Stöfen	Nominated	
Actors and Actresses Union Awards	16 March 2026	Best Actress in an International Production	Carla Díaz	Won	

== See also ==
- Fresh, 2022 American film about culinary human cannibalism.
- What You Wish For, 2023 American film about culinary human cannibalism.
