= Eva Löbau =

Austrian film and television actress (born 1972)

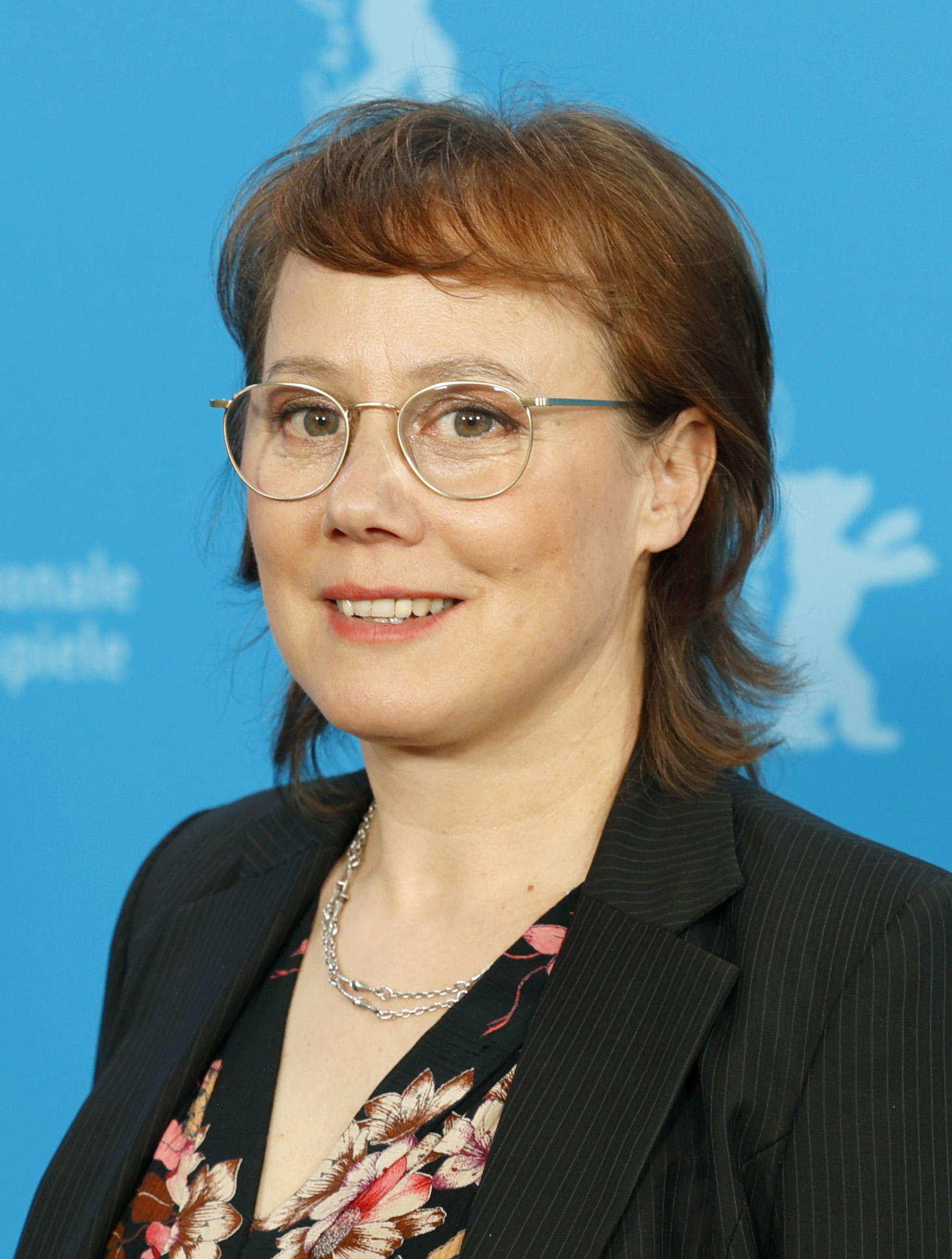
- Löbau in 2026
- Born: 26 April 1972 (age 54); Waiblingen, West Germany
- Occupation: Actress

Eva Löbau (born 26 April 1972 in Waiblingen, West Germany) is an Austrian actress. She appeared as Nurse Gretchen Erfurt in the 2011 film Unknown, which is set in the German capital city of Berlin. She also played the lead role in Maren Ade's The Forest for the Trees.

She played Friederike Kuhn in The Teacher's Lounge.
