= Toni Erdmann =

2016 film by Maren Ade

- Theatrical release poster
- Directed by: Maren Ade
- Written by: Maren Ade
- Produced by: Maren Ade; Jonas Dornbach; Janine Jackowski; Michel Merkt
- Starring: Peter Simonischek; Sandra Hüller; Ingrid Bisu; Michael Wittenborn; Thomas Loibl; Trystan Pütter; Hadewych Minis; Lucy Russell; Vlad Ivanov; Victoria Cocias
- Cinematography: Patrick Orth
- Edited by: Heike Parplies
- Production companies: Komplizen Film; coop99 filmproduktion; KNM; Missing Link Films; SWR; WDR; Arte
- Distributed by: NFP Marketing & Distribution (Germany); Filmladen (Austria)
- Release dates: 14 May 2016 (Cannes); 14 July 2016 (Germany); 15 July 2016 (Austria)
- Running time: 162 minutes
- Countries: Germany; Austria
- Languages: German; English; Romanian
- Budget: €3 million; (US$3.2 million)
- Box office: US$11.7 million

Toni Erdmann is a 2016 comedy drama film, produced, written and directed by Maren Ade. It stars Peter Simonischek as an eccentric man who intrudes upon the life of his daughter, a career-focused business executive played by Sandra Hüller.

Toni Erdmann premiered on 14 May 2016 at the Cannes Film Festival, where it competed in the main competition. It was released in Germany and Austria on 14 and 15 July, and grossed $11.7 million on a $3.2 million budget. The film received wide acclaim from critics for Ade's direction and writing, as well as Simonischek's and Hüller's performances. Sight & Sound named Toni Erdmann the best film of 2016. At the 29th European Film Awards, it won five awards, including Best Film (a first for a film directed by a woman). It was nominated for the Best Foreign Language Film at the 89th Academy Awards.

== Plot ==
Winfried Conradi is a divorced music teacher from Aachen with a passion for bizarre pranks involving several fake personas. Following the death of his beloved dog, he decides to reconnect with his daughter, Ines, who is pursuing a career in business consulting. Ines is working in Bucharest, Romania, on an outsourcing project in the oil industry. Consumed by her work, she seems to have little time for her family.

Winfried spontaneously travels to Bucharest and waits for Ines in the lobby of an office complex. After several hours, she finally appears, accompanied by several of her client's board members and on the way to a meeting. Winfried puts on sunglasses and fake teeth as a playful disguise, and approaches the group from the side while hiding behind a newspaper. Ines ignores him, but meets with him briefly after work and invites him to a business reception at the US Embassy.

In the evening, Winfried and Ines attend the reception, where they meet Henneberg, a German oil company CEO with whom Ines wishes to secure a consulting contract. Ines tries to gain Henneberg's attention, but Henneberg seems more interested in her father. Winfried tells Henneberg that he has hired a replacement daughter because Ines is always busy. To Ines's surprise, Henneberg invites Winfried and Ines for drinks, along with his entourage. At the bar, Henneberg once again brushes Ines aside and makes fun of Winfried.

After several days, Ines and Winfried are struggling to get along. Stressed out from work, Ines oversleeps, missing a planned rendezvous with clients, and blames her father for not waking her up. Feeling alienated and unwanted, he leaves in a taxi for the airport. Ines continues with her work as normal, and several days later arranges to meet two female friends at a bar. While Ines and her friends are chatting, a man approaches and introduces himself as "Toni Erdmann". The man is clearly Winfried in a wig and false teeth, but Ines does not let on. Her two friends politely engage "Erdmann" in conversation; he explains that he is a "life coach" and consultant visiting Bucharest to attend the funeral of his friend's turtle.

Ines is increasingly frustrated and unfulfilled in her work and personal life, but continues to encounter "Erdmann" sporadically at parties or outside her office. At first Ines is angry with her father, and accuses him of trying to "ruin" her, but as time goes on she comes to see the value of her father's interventions in her life, and plays along with the ruse. "Erdmann" accompanies her on a night out with her work friends, and eventually even accompanies her to a business meeting. In turn, "Erdmann" takes Ines to a Romanian family's Easter party, where he forces her into a reluctant performance of Whitney Houston's "Greatest Love of All". After singing, Ines promptly rushes off.

Back at her flat, Ines is preparing to host a business team-building brunch to celebrate her birthday. She struggles to zip up her tight dress, realizes her shoes don't match, and attempts to change clothes. The doorbell rings. Instead of redressing, or changing her outfit, she opens the door wearing only her underpants. The first guest is her friend Steph, who offers to help her get dressed. Ines refuses, and when the next guest arrives she spontaneously removes her underpants and answers the door naked, telling her guests that her birthday brunch is a "naked party". Each of them reacts differently, with some leaving in disgust while others self-consciously strip. As the party becomes increasingly awkward, Winfried arrives dressed in a full-body Bulgarian kukeri costume. The costume first scares, then amuses, the partygoers, and Winfried soon leaves. Ines follows him. Outside in a public park, they hug, Winfried still in costume. She leaves the park. Winfried lies down on the grass, exhausted, and then seeks help from a hotel desk to remove the costume's head.

Months later, Ines returns to Germany for her grandmother's funeral. She has quit her job in Bucharest and will shortly begin a new one in Singapore. While talking with Winfried in the garden, Ines grabs the fake teeth from his shirt pocket and puts them on. Winfried says he wants to take a photo and goes to get his camera, leaving Ines alone in the garden.

== Cast ==
- Peter Simonischek as Winfried Conradi / Toni Erdmann
- Sandra Hüller as Ines Conradi
- Ingrid Bisu as Anca
- Lucy Russell as Steph
- Michael Wittenborn as Henneberg
- Thomas Loibl as Gerald
- Trystan Pütter as Tim
- Hadewych Minis as Tatjana
- Vlad Ivanov as Iliescu
- Victoria Cocias as Flavia
- Ingrid Burkhard as Grandma Annegret
- Klara Höfels as Irma

== Production ==
The character of Winfried was loosely based on Ade's own father, who wore a pair of fake teeth she gave him as a gag gift to play practical jokes. She was also influenced by the comedian Andy Kaufman's alter ego Tony Clifton.

Ade set the film in Bucharest in part because many German companies had begun to do business there at the end of the Communist era, with many foreign consultants sent to "change the system" and help businesses turn a profit. "And I like the new wave of Romanian films right now, too. So it’d be fun to work there."

== Release ==
Toni Erdmann had its world premiere at the 2016 Cannes Film Festival. The film was originally accepted into the festival's less prestigious Un Certain Regard section, but the night before the April press conference Ade and her producer were informed that it had been selected to compete for the Palme d'Or. Shortly thereafter, Sony Pictures Classics and Thunderbird Releasing acquired US, Latin American and UK distribution rights to the film, respectively.

The film went on to screen at the Filmfest München on 23 June 2016; Sydney Film Festival on 15 June 2016; Karlovy Vary International Film Festival on 3 July 2016; Telluride Film Festival on 2 September 2016; Toronto International Film Festival on 8 September 2016; New York Film Festival on 2 October 2016; and the BFI London Film Festival on 8 October 2016.

The film was released in Germany on 14 July 2016, Austria on 15 July 2016, and Switzerland on 21 July 2016. The film was released in the United States on 25 December 2016.

== Genre ==
Critics have called the film a dadaesque comedy-drama. Ade said she thought the story "always had both genres within it, because [Winfried is] playing a comedy for [Ines], but he’s doing it out of desperation." In writing the script, Ade was interested in the film's comedic potential, but had doubts during the filming. "Then, when we edited the film, I found that the comedy was even stronger because we took things so seriously. For example, in scenes like the naked party where the boss is standing at the door, it was really necessary in terms of comedy for it to be as existential as possible" with the "actor not thinking of it as a comedy".

Hüller said that she always thinks "about how humor works" and it was this question "we were asking ourselves during the process. What is it that makes people laugh? What is funny about Toni? I think...desperation...is the origin of comedy." Falling out of a chair is "the oldest joke". But even when things don't work, "you really have to try, seriously. I think that’s what we did — you never have to play the joke."

== Reception ==
=== Box office ===
Toni Erdmann opened on July 14, 2016, in Germany and was watched by 752,000 domestic viewers that year. The movie was widely advertised through all public media channels and became the 40th most watched movie in Germany in 2016.

=== Critical response ===
The film received universal acclaim from critics. It holds a 93% approval rating on review aggregator website Rotten Tomatoes, based on 234 reviews, with an average rating of 8.3/10. The website's critical consensus reads, "Toni Erdmann pairs carefully constructed, three-dimensional characters in a tenderly funny character study that's both genuinely moving and impressively ambitious." On Metacritic, the film holds a rating of 93 out of 100, based on 36 reviews, indicating "universal acclaim".

The film was named the best film of the year by the French magazine Cahiers du cinéma. The British film magazine Sight & Sound also named it the best film of 2016 in its poll of 163 critics worldwide. In a 2016 international critics' poll conducted by BBC, the film along with Requiem for a Dream and the film version of Carlos tied for the 100th greatest motion picture since 2000. It also topped the American magazine Film Comment's Best Films of 2016 poll. The New York Times’s chief film critics, A. O. Scott and Manohla Dargis, included it on their lists.

In June 2025, the film ranked 59th on The New York Times's list of "The 100 Best Movies of the 21st Century." In July 2025, it ranked 95th on Rolling Stone's list of "The 100 Best Movies of the 21st Century."

=== Accolades ===
Toni Erdmann received the FIPRESCI Award for Best Film In Competition at the 2016 Cannes Film Festival.

In August 2016, the film won the FIPRESCI (International Federation of Film Critics)'s Grand Prix for best film of the year, the first time this accolade has been awarded to a female filmmaker.

Later that year, in November 2016, the film was awarded the European Parliament's Lux Prize, annually awarded to facilitate the diffusion of European films in the European Union.

List of awards and nominations
Award	Date of ceremony	Category	Recipient(s)	Result	Ref.
Academy Awards	February 26, 2017	Best Foreign Language Film	Maren Ade	Nominated	
Alliance of Women Film Journalists	December 21, 2016	Best Non-English-Language Film	Maren Ade	Nominated	
Austin Film Critics Association	December 28, 2016	Best Foreign Language Film	Toni Erdmann	Nominated	
Australian Film Critics Association	March 13, 2018	Best International Film (Foreign Language)	Toni Erdmann	Won	
British Academy Film Awards	February 12, 2017	Best Film Not in the English Language	Toni Erdmann	Nominated	
British Independent Film Awards	December 4, 2016	Best Foreign Independent Film	Maren Ade, Jonas Dornbach, Janine Jackowski and Michael Merkt	Nominated	
Brussels Film Festival	June 24, 2016	Golden Iris Award	Maren Ade	Won	
Brussels Film Festival	June 24, 2016	RTBF TV Prize for Best Film	Maren Ade	Won	
Brussels Film Festival	June 24, 2016	Best Screenplay Award	Maren Ade	Won	
Cannes Film Festival	May 22, 2016	FIPRESCI Award	Maren Ade	Won	
Cannes Film Festival	May 22, 2016	Palme d'Or	Maren Ade	Nominated	
César Award	February 24, 2017	Meilleur film étranger	Toni Erdmann	Nominated	
Chicago Film Critics Association	December 15, 2016	Best Foreign Language Film	Toni Erdmann	Nominated	
Critics' Choice Awards	December 11, 2016	Best Foreign Language Film	Toni Erdmann	Nominated	
Dallas–Fort Worth Film Critics Association	December 13, 2016	Best Foreign Language Film	Toni Erdmann	2nd Place	
Dorian Awards	January 26, 2017	Foreign Language Film of the Year	Toni Erdmann	Nominated	
European Film Awards	December 10, 2016	Best Film	Toni Erdmann	Won	
European Film Awards	December 10, 2016	Best Director	Maren Ade	Won	
European Film Awards	December 10, 2016	Best Screenwriter	Maren Ade	Won	
European Film Awards	December 10, 2016	Best Actor	Peter Simonischek	Won	
European Film Awards	December 10, 2016	Best Actress	Sandra Hüller	Won	
Florida Film Critics Circle	December 23, 2016	Best Foreign Language Film	Toni Erdmann	Nominated	
Golden Globe Awards	January 8, 2017	Best Foreign Language Film	Toni Erdmann	Nominated	
Guldbagge Awards	January 23, 2017	Best Foreign Film	Toni Erdmann	Nominated	
Houston Film Critics Society	January 6, 2017	Best Foreign Language Film	Toni Erdmann	Nominated	
Independent Spirit Awards	February 25, 2017	Best International Film	Toni Erdmann	Won	
IndieWire Critics Poll	December 19, 2016	Best Film	Toni Erdmann	4th Place	
IndieWire Critics Poll	December 19, 2016	Best Director	Maren Ade	3rd Place	
IndieWire Critics Poll	December 19, 2016	Best Actress	Sandra Hüller	3rd Place	
IndieWire Critics Poll	December 19, 2016	Best Actor	Peter Simonischek	4th Place	
IndieWire Critics Poll	December 19, 2016	Best Screenplay	Toni Erdmann	7th Place	
London Film Critics Circle	January 22, 2017	Film of the Year	Toni Erdmann	Nominated	
London Film Critics Circle	January 22, 2017	Director of the Year	Maren Ade	Nominated	
London Film Critics Circle	January 22, 2017	Actor of the Year	Peter Simonischek	Nominated	
London Film Critics Circle	January 22, 2017	Actress of the Year	Sandra Hüller	Nominated	
London Film Critics Circle	January 22, 2017	Screenwriter of the Year	Maren Ade	Nominated	
London Film Critics Circle	January 22, 2017	Foreign Language Film of the Year	Toni Erdmann	Won	
Los Angeles Film Critics Association	December 4, 2016	Best Foreign Language Film	Toni Erdmann	Runner-up	
National Society of Film Critics	January 7, 2017	Best Actress	Sandra Hüller	2nd Place (Note: Tied with Annette Bening for 20th Century Women)	
National Society of Film Critics	January 7, 2017	Best Foreign Language Film	Toni Erdmann	Won	
New York Film Critics Circle	December 1, 2016	Best Foreign Language Film	Toni Erdmann	Won	
New York Film Critics Online	December 11, 2016	Top 12 Films	Toni Erdmann	Won	
Online Film Critics Society	January 3, 2017	Best Foreign Language Film	Toni Erdmann	Nominated	
Palić Film Festival	July 22, 2016	Golden Tower for Best Film	Maren Ade	Won	
Palm Springs International Film Festival	January 15, 2017	FIPRESCI Prize for Best Foreign Language Film of the Year	Toni Erdmann	Won	
San Francisco Film Critics Circle	December 11, 2016	Best Foreign Language Film	Toni Erdmann	Nominated	
Satellite Awards	February 19, 2017	Best Foreign Language Film	Toni Erdmann	Nominated	
St. Louis Gateway Film Critics Association	December 18, 2016	Best Foreign Language Film	Toni Erdmann	Nominated	
Toronto Film Critics Association	December 11, 2016	Best Film	Toni Erdmann	Runner-up	
Toronto Film Critics Association	December 11, 2016	Best Actor	Peter Simonischek	Runner-up	
Toronto Film Critics Association	December 11, 2016	Best Actress	Sandra Hüller	Won	
Toronto Film Critics Association	December 11, 2016	Best Director	Maren Ade	Won	
Toronto Film Critics Association	December 11, 2016	Best Screenplay	Maren Ade	Runner-up	
Toronto Film Critics Association	December 11, 2016	Best Foreign Language Film	Toni Erdmann	Won	
UK Film Festival	November 27, 2016	Best Comedy Film	Toni Erdmann	Won	
Vancouver Film Critics Circle	December 20, 2016	Best Foreign Language Film	Toni Erdmann	Won	
Washington D.C. Area Film Critics Association	December 5, 2016	Best Foreign Language Film	Toni Erdmann	Nominated	
Women Film Critics Circle	December 19, 2016	Best Foreign Film by or about Women	Toni Erdmann	Nominated	

== Proposed remake ==
On February 7, 2017, Variety announced that Paramount Pictures had signed Jack Nicholson and Kristen Wiig for an American remake of the film, with Adam McKay, Will Ferrell, and Jessica Elbaum as producers. In August 2018, Nicholson and producer Lena Dunham withdrew from the movie, effectively stalling its development.

== See also ==
- List of submissions to the 89th Academy Awards for Best Foreign Language Film
- List of German submissions for the Academy Award for Best Foreign Language Film
