= The Forest for the Trees =

- German: Der Wald vor lauter Bäumen
- Directed by: Maren Ade
- Written by: Maren Ade
- Produced by: Janine Jackowski
- Starring: Eva Löbau; Daniela Holz; Jan Neumann
- Cinematography: Nikolai von Graevenitz
- Edited by: Heike Parplies
- Music by: Ina Siefert; Nellis du Biel
- Production companies: Komplizen Film; Kaufmann Wöbke GbR; HFF München
- Distributed by: Timebandits Films
- Release date: 2003
- Running time: 81 minutes
- Country: Germany
- Language: German

The Forest for the Trees (German: Der Wald vor lauter Bäumen) is a 2003 German film directed by Maren Ade in her feature film directorial debut.

The movie premiered at the 2003 Hof International Film Festival before going on to play at the 2004 Toronto International Film Festival and the 2005 Sundance Film Festival.

== Plot ==
Melanie Pröschle is a 27-year-old school teacher who moves to Karlsruhe to work at a new school. Melanie is optimistic about her new life but she is quickly demoralized by her difficulty making friends in the new city and by the unruly students she can't control.

After a student throws chocolate milk on her, Melanie tries to discipline him by talking to his mother, but after his mother dismisses the incident, Melanie covers it up.

Melanie manages to befriend Tina, a salesgirl who sells her a jacket and who happens to live in the same tenement building as she does. After Tina visits Melanie in her apartment, the two get drunk and, realizing that Tina's apartment is viewable from Melanie's apartment, they end up spying on Tina's ex, Tobias, as he enters the apartment. Melanie continues to pursue Tina's friendship, but things quickly become awkward as Melanie spies on Tina from her apartment and goes out of her way to chase down Tina.

At school, things take a turn for the worse when Melanie overhears two colleagues discussing her and how she lets the children run wild. Upset, Melanie calls her mother, but rather than worry her, ends up cancelling her planned trip home to stay in Karlsruhe over vacation. She spends her vacation alone, spying on Tina as she goes out with her other friends.

As the new term begins, Melanie continues to have problems at school and with Tina. She is relieved when Tina invites her to her birthday party; however, she bumps into Tobias outside and, introducing herself, tells him it would be better if he didn't come inside. Tobias then gives her flowers to deliver to Tina. When Tina realizes that Melanie told Tobias not to come up, she tells her to leave.

Melanie's attempts to reconnect with Tina fail and while spying on Tina from her window, she spots Tobias and Tina peering back at her and appearing to make fun of her. Upset, Melanie begins to miss work obligations, skipping parent-teacher night. The following day she leaves class in the middle of the day, gets in her car and begins to drive. As she drives, she lets go of the wheel and climbs into the back seat where she calmly surveys the scenery.

== Cast ==
- Eva Löbau as Melanie Pröschle
- Daniela Holtz as Tina Schaffner
- Jan Neumann as Thorsten Rehm
- Ilona Schulz as Frau Sussmann
- Robert Schupp as Tobias
- Heinz Röser-Dümmig as Lutger Reinhardt
- Martina Eckrich as Renate Pföhler
- Nina Fiedler as Bine
- Hans-Rüdiger Kucich as Gerd Postweiler
- Ruth Köppler as Elvira Fischer-Walter
- Achim Enchelmaier as Bernd
- Monika Hirschle as Melanie's mother
- Volker Jeck as Melanies Vater
- Hans-Peter Gastiger as recycler
- Andreas Bornhardt as Garden Center worker
- Violetta Breuer as neighbor
- Siegfried Schneider as Herr Meiser

== Film development ==
The film was Ade's thesis film for film school. Ade based the movie on stories her parents, who both were teachers, had told her.

== Release ==
The Forest for the Trees was released on DVD on February 1, 2006 by Film Movement.

== Reception ==
=== Awards ===
In 2005, The Forest for the Trees won the top award at three international film festivals: the Indie Lisboa Festival (in Portugal), the Newport Film Festival, and the Valencia Golden Jove Film Festival.

=== Critical response ===
On review aggregator website Rotten Tomatoes, the film has an approval rating of 77% based on 13 critics, with an average rating of 6.3/10.

Jamie Woolley of BBC wrote "For a first film, it's accomplished; for a college project, it's astonishing".

Time Out commented "Eva Löbau's lynchpin performance as Melanie is a shattering lesson in the tropes of timidity and awkwardness, and serves in taking this cinema of cruelty into as yet uncharted territory".

According to Eddie Cockrell of Variety "Tapping in to primal fears of professional ineptitude and social rejection with an almost sadistic meticulousness, The Forest for the Trees is a precisely modulated first film".
