= Dora or the Sexual Neuroses of Our Parents =

2015 film

Dora or The Sexual Neuroses of Our Parents
- Film poster
- Directed by: Stina Werenfels
- Written by: Boris Treyer; Stina Werenfels
- Based on: Die sexuellen Neurosen unserer Eltern by Lukas Bärfuss
- Starring: Victoria Schulz
- Cinematography: Lukas Strebel
- Edited by: Jann Anderegg
- Music by: Peter Scherer
- Release date: 23 January 2015
- Running time: 90 minutes
- Countries: Switzerland; Germany
- Language: German

Dora or The Sexual Neuroses of Our Parents (German: Dora oder Die sexuellen Neurosen unserer Eltern) is a 2015 Swiss drama film directed by Stina Werenfels and based on the play Die sexuellen Neurosen unserer Eltern by Lukas Bärfuss. It was screened in the Panorama section of the 65th Berlin International Film Festival and received five Swiss Film Award nominations.

== Synopsis ==
Dora, an 18-year-old woman with an intellectual disability, becomes eager to explore life after her mother Kristin stops her medication. She soon begins a sexual relationship with a man, alarming her mother, and continues to see him without her parents’ knowledge. As Kristin struggles with her own desire for another child, Dora becomes pregnant.

== Cast ==
The cast includes:

- Victoria Schulz as Dora
- Jenny Schily as Kristin
- Lars Eidinger as Peter
- Urs Jucker as Felix
- Inga Busch as Barbara

== Reception ==
=== Awards ===
Victoria Schulz won the Grand Prix d'interprétation at the Festival International de Films de Femmes de Créteil in 2016 for her performance in the film. The film also won the Grand Prix du Jury Fiction at the same festival in 2016, as well as the Cineuropa Award and the Cinelab Award for the Best Image at the Brussels Film Festival in 2015.[1] It was also nominated for five Swiss Film Awards in 2015: Best Fiction Film, Best Screenplay (for Boris Treyer and Stina Werenfels), Best Cinematography, and Best Film Score.

It was one of seven films shortlisted by Switzerland to be their submission for the Academy Award for Best Foreign Language Film at the 88th Academy Awards, but it lost out to Iraqi Odyssey.

=== Critical response ===
Filmdienst described the film as unusually forceful and courageous, and wrote that its protagonist stands for the right to sexuality and self-determination among people with intellectual disabilities. SRF praised the film’s precise construction and described it as a work that "goes to the heart and hits the stomach". Tages-Anzeiger described the film as disturbing and intimate, and praised its naturalistic visual style.

== Festival screenings ==
The film premiered in January 2015. It was screened in the Panorama section of the 65th Berlin International Film Festival that year, and was later shown at festivals including the Solothurn Film Festival in 2015, the Brussels Film Festival in 2015, the Mons International Film Festival in 2016, the Guadalajara International Film Festival in 2016, the Créteil International Women’s Film Festival in 2016.
