= My Little Sister (2020 film) =

2020 film

- Film poster
- Directed by: Stéphanie Chuat; Véronique Reymond
- Written by: Stéphanie Chuat; Véronique Reymond
- Produced by: Ruth Waldburger
- Starring: Nina Hoss; Lars Eidinger
- Cinematography: Filip Zumbrunn
- Edited by: Myriam Rachmuth
- Music by: Christian Garcia
- Release date: 24 February 2020 (Berlinale)
- Running time: 99 minutes
- Country: Switzerland
- Language: German

My Little Sister (German: Schwesterlein) is a 2020 Swiss drama film written and directed by Stéphanie Chuat and Véronique Reymond and starring Nina Hoss and Lars Eidinger. It premiered in the Competition section of the 70th Berlin International Film Festival in February 2020 and was selected as the Swiss entry for the Best International Feature Film at the 93rd Academy Awards. At the 2021 Swiss Film Awards, it won Best Fiction Film, Best Cinematography, Best Film Editing, and Best Screenplay.

== Synopsis ==
Lisa, a playwright living in Switzerland, becomes preoccupied with helping her twin brother Sven, a well-known stage actor, after he falls seriously ill. Her efforts to support him and bring him back to the theatre begin to overshadow the rest of her life.

== Cast ==
The cast includes:

- Nina Hoss as Lisa
- Lars Eidinger as Sven
- Marthe Keller as Kathy
- Jens Albinus as Martin
- Thomas Ostermeier as David

== Reception ==
=== Awards and nominations ===
At the 2021 Swiss Film Awards, My Little Sister won Best Fiction Film, Best Cinematography, Best Film Editing, and Best Screenplay. It was also selected as the Swiss entry for the Academy Award for Best International Feature Film at the 93rd Academy Awards.

=== Critical response ===
The film received positive reviews from critics, with a 94% rating on Rotten Tomatoes based on 35 reviews and a score of 75 out of 100 on Metacritic based on 13 critic reviews, indicating generally favorable reviews.

Peter Bradshaw of The Guardian called My Little Sister a "fierce and fraught family drama", while Wendy Ide of The Observer called the film a "terrific, prickly sibling drama". Ty Burr of The Boston Globe called the film "a bracing trip", and "a work of daredevil nerve that serves as its own reward". According to Anna Smith of Deadline Hollywood, the film is "moving without being mawkish".

== Festival screenings ==
My Little Sister premiered in the Competition section of the 70th Berlin International Film Festival in February 2020. It later screened at festivals including the Stockholm International Film Festival and the Seville European Film Festival in 2020, and at the Solothurn Film Festival and the Locarno Film Festival in 2021.

== See also ==
- List of submissions to the 93rd Academy Awards for Best International Feature Film
- List of Swiss submissions for the Academy Award for Best International Feature Film
