= Everyone Else =

- Theatrical release poster
- Directed by: Maren Ade
- Screenplay by: Maren Ade
- Produced by: Maren Ade; Dirk Engelhardt; Janine Jackowski
- Starring: Birgit Minichmayr; Lars Eidinger
- Cinematography: Bernhard Keller
- Edited by: Heike Parplies
- Production company: Komplizen Film
- Distributed by: Prokino Filmverleih
- Release dates: 9 February 2009 (Berlin); 18 June 2009 (Germany)
- Running time: 119 minutes
- Country: Germany
- Language: German
- Box office: $102,042

Everyone Else (German: Alle anderen) is a 2009 German romantic drama film written and directed by Maren Ade. The film was awarded with the Silver Bear at the 59th Berlin Film Festival.

== Plot ==
Gitti and Chris are a young German couple on vacation at Chris's family villa in Sardinia. Gitti is much more spontaneous and light-hearted than Chris, wanting to go out and try to make friends while Chris remains introverted, preferring to stay in and read, even hiding from his neighbour; her playful demeanor often annoys him, while his guarded attitude exasperates her. When he tries to speak to Gitti about his unhappy feelings about his life and career she interrupts him to say that he muses too much over everything and should consider settling down with her. Chris is upset and insulted by her outburst. Later, Gitti and Chris admit to each other that they often worry they're not the right person for each other.

While shopping for groceries Chris spots Hans, a successful old classmate, and unsuccessfully tries to hide from him. Hans invites the couple to a barbecue at his home with his wife Sana, a successful fashion designer, which Gitti tries to decline as she has already received an invitation from a bohemian couple she has recently met. Chris overrides her and accepts the invitation. While Sana and Hans appear to be the perfect, thriving couple, they quickly prove to be obnoxious, bland, and vapid. Hans eventually reveals that Chris has declined an architecture prize because his design would be melded with another architect, though Chris had previously told Gitti that he hadn't heard back from the competition, which angers Gitti. When Gitti stands up for Chris in the face of Hans's subtle insults, Chris becomes upset.

The following day Chris is hyper critical of Gitti, taking her on a long hike during which they get lost. Afterwards he informs her that he will be going for a drink with Hans alone, as Gitti embarrassed him the previous evening. When he asks Gitti why she can't be more normal, like Sana, Gitti argues that she doesn't want to be like everybody else. Though Gitti begs him not to leave her alone at night, he goes anyway, returning in the morning. The following day Chris informs Gitti that he is considering taking an architecture job on the island. While Chris meets with his potential client, Gitti goes exploring on her own, trying out a new makeover and choosing to keep the dress she previously regarded as too "bourgeoisie" in an effort to please Chris. After meeting up with Chris by chance, he suggests they invite Hans and Sana to their home. The atmosphere becomes uncomfortable when Gitti runs into the bohemian couple she had previously met; they are put off by her new, put-together appearance and are somewhat hurt that she had stood them up. When they extend the invitation again, Chris clumsily declines, which annoys Gitti.

Gitti makes an effort to tone down her appearance and mannerisms for the dinner with Hans and Sana, but it nevertheless becomes awkward as Chris starts behaving oddly in an attempt to impress the other couple. Gitti becomes more uncomfortable when Chris takes them into his mother's private dream room and mocks her interests for Hans and Sana's amusement. At the end of the night, Hans playfully throws Sana into the villa pool, leading Chris to throw Gitti in as well even as she begs him not to. Upset, she asks Sana to make an excuse so that she and Hans will leave. Chris tells Gitti he loves her and initiates sex, which she accepts dispassionately.

The next day, Chris overhears Gitti concocting an excuse to leave early without letting him know. After confronting her, Gitti asserts that she is leaving him, and no longer loves him anymore because he is a weakling. Chris fires back that she is a naive hypocrite and asks her to leave. While packing her things, Gitti falls to the floor and plays dead. At first worried, and then upset by her games, Chris resolves to make things work and let his guard down. He blows raspberries into her stomach, which makes her laugh, and the two finally look at each other.

== Cast ==
- Birgit Minichmayr as Gitti
- Lars Eidinger as Chris
- Nicole Marischka as Sana
- Hans-Jochen Wagner as Hans

== Release ==
=== Critical reception ===
The film received positive reviews from film critics. On the review aggregator website Rotten Tomatoes, 88% of 42 critics' reviews are positive, with an average rating of 7.6/10. The website's consensus reads: "Alle Anderen (Everyone Else) taps into the unpredictable energy between two couples to throw finely detailed - and richly rewarding - sparks of emotional truth." Metacritic, which uses a weighted average, assigned the film a score of 71 out of 100, based on 16 critics, indicating "generally favorable" reviews.

=== Awards and nominations ===
Year	Film Festival	Award	Category
2009	Berlin International Film Festival	Jury Grand Prix	Best Film
2009	Berlin International Film Festival	Silver Bear	Best Actress
2009	Berlin International Film Festival	Femina Film Prize	Best Production Design

Submissions

- Berlin International Film Festival
  - Golden Bear (nominated)
- German Film Awards
  - Best Direction (nominated)
  - Best Performance by an Actress in a leading role (nominated)
  - Outstanding Feature Film (nominated)
