= Western (2017 film) =

2017 film

- Film poster
- Directed by: Valeska Grisebach
- Written by: Valeska Grisebach
- Produced by: Jonas Dornbach; Janine Jackowski; Maren Ade; Valeska Grisebach; Michel Merkt
- Starring: Meinhard Neumann; Reinhardt Wetrek; Syuleyman Alilov Letifov; Veneta Frangova; Vyara Borisova
- Cinematography: Bernhard Keller
- Edited by: Bettina Böhler
- Production companies: Komplizen Film Production; Chouchkov Brothers; Coop99; KNM; ZDF-Das Kleine Fernsehspiel; ARTE
- Distributed by: Piffl Medien (Germany); Stadtkino Wien Filmverleih (Austria)
- Release dates: 18 May 2017 (Cannes); 24 August 2017 (Germany)
- Running time: 121 minutes
- Countries: Germany; Austria; Bulgaria
- Languages: German; Bulgarian

Western is a 2017 internationally co-produced drama film written, produced, and directed by Valeska Grisebach. It was screened in the Un Certain Regard section at the 2017 Cannes Film Festival. The film has been well received by critics. The film stars Meinhard Neumann in his first acting role as a German construction worker in Bulgaria who finds himself in the middle of a culture clash with the locals.

== Plot ==
Meinhard is one of a group of German construction workers hired to build a hydroelectric plant in a remote Bulgarian village near the Greek border. As the water supply to mix the cement has been interrupted and promised gravel does not arrive, their work comes to a halt, leading to boredom. While sunning in a nearby river they meet some local women out bathing and the encounter becomes antagonistic when one of the Bulgarian women loses her sun hat and the German worker who retrieves it refuses to give it back and tries to push her underwater.

There are other conflicts: locals object to the Germans stealing fruit from an orchard while local steal the German's flag.

Meinhard meanwhile finds a white horse. He rides it into the village and tries to talk to the locals, their interactions limited because they lack a common language. The horse belongs to a local man, Adrian, who allows Meinhard to ride it. Meinhard ends up befriending Adrian and his family, cobbling together bits of conversation.

Meinhard discovers that the lack of water is due to the limited water supply being rationed between villages. The locals explain that they cannot give the Germans the water needed for their work or they themselves will be without any.

The foreman, Vincent, eventually takes the white horse and goes to the water well, turning off the water for the locals. In the process, he fatally injures the horse in a fall from a steep incline, something Meinhard later finds out when he finds the dying horse and kills the horse to prevent further suffering.

During negotiations over access to the water, possibly involving improving the supply, Vincent flirts with Viara, who is acting as a translator. She rebuffs him: later, when Meinhard approaches her, she and Meinhard go for a walk and later have sex.

Returning home that evening Meinhard is approached by a Bulgarian man who lost his money to Meinhard playing poker. He pleads with Meinhard to return the money, but Meinhard only returns some of it. Later, returning to the camp in the dark, Meinhard is attacked by his own German co-workers. Meinhard is able to fend off the attack but spends the night outdoors.

In the morning, he is picked up to by his Bulgarian friends and taken to a village party where the two nationalities mix. Meinhard is punched at the party by a local man after a brief altercation regarding his involvement with Viara. Afterwards, his friend, Adrian, remarks that such conflict is a part of village life. Following the confrontation, Meinhard goes to leave the party, but as he is about to disappear into the evening darkness, he has a change of heart. Meinhard turns round, returns to the party and joins in the dancing.

== Cast ==
- Meinhard Neumann as Meinhard
- Reinhardt Wetrek as Vincent
- Syuleyman Alilov Letifov as Adrian
- Veneta Frangova as Veneta
- Vyara Borisova as Tania
- Waldemar Zang as The Greek
- Detlef Schaich as Helmuth

== Production ==
The film was shot almost entirely with newcomers as actors.

== Reception ==
On review aggregator website Rotten Tomatoes, the film holds an approval rating of 96% based on 69 reviews, and an average rating of 8/10. The site's consensus reads: "Western earns the viewer's attention with an unpredictable, patiently told tale that evokes the spirit of the titular genre while adding its own unique touches". On Metacritic, the film has a weighted average score of 81 out of 100, based on 13 critics, indicating "universal acclaim".

Western received praise from critics. Justin Chang of the Los Angeles Times wrote, "The story is a faultlessly observed, broodingly intelligent piece of realism, a dispatch from a sun-baked frontier that could hardly feel more mundane or specific, but which Grisebach somehow suffuses with the beauty and power of myth." In his review for The New York Times, A. O. Scott wrote, "Western is as precise as a dropped pin on a GPS map, which makes its sense of mystery all the more powerful."
