= Suspect (2008 film) =

- Directed by: Felix Hassenfratz
- Written by: Felix Hassenfratz
- Produced by: Mathias Casanova
- Starring: Anne Weinknecht, Heinrich Schmieder, Daniela Holtz
- Cinematography: Yoshi Heimrath
- Edited by: Barbara Toennieshen
- Music by: Aylin Aykan
- Distributed by: SWR / Arte
- Release date: 15 January 2008 (Max Ophüls Festival)
- Running time: 26 minutes
- Country: Germany
- Language: German

Suspect (German: Der Verdacht) is a 2008 short film. It was the final graduation project of director Felix Hassenfratz at the Internationale Filmschule Köln. The story, inspired by true events and based on the documentary The Baker Did It, is set in a southern German province with the Badisch dialect. The film is a co-production with the broadcast stations SWR and Arte, and supported by a German film fund. Despite its regional emphasis, Suspect is a universal story, focused on human behaviour, a story about love in the face of doubt.

== Synopsis ==
What to do and whom to believe when you live in a small village and your husband, the village baker, is the suspect in an unsolved murder? He’s not from the village and your mother still doesn't accept his taking over the family business after your father's death. You also find a shirt stained with blood and a gun kept in a locked cabinet, and he insists he’s innocent. Can love overcome doubt?

== Festivals and screenings ==
=== Germany (all 2008) ===
Film Festival Max Ophüls Preis
Munich International Film Festival
24. Int. Berlin Film Festival Interfilm
Festival of German Cinema
Landshut Short Film Festival (Won an award)
Sehsüchte int. student film festival Potsdam
International Filmfest Emden
Film Festival Shorts At Moonlight
Wendland Shorts (Won an award)
New Talents Biennale Cologne
Int. Film Festival Passau
Regensburger Kurzfilmwoche

=== International (all 2008) ===
St. Petersburg White Nights Festival
32. Montreal World Film Festival
Palm Springs International Festival of Short Films
Encounters Short Film Festival, Bristol
Foyle Int. Film Festival, Ireland
Atlantic Film Festival, Halifax
Buenos Aires Film Festival
Goethe Institute Paris – selection of contemporary German cinema
Zagreb Film Festival

== Awards ==
- 2007: The film rating agency FBW labeled the movie "of special merit"
- 2007: Short film of the month – German film rating agency
- 2008: BMW short film prize
- 2008: Jury prize, Wendland Shorts
- 2008: Best Screenplay Studio Hamburg Newcomer Award
