= Lars Eidinger =

German actor

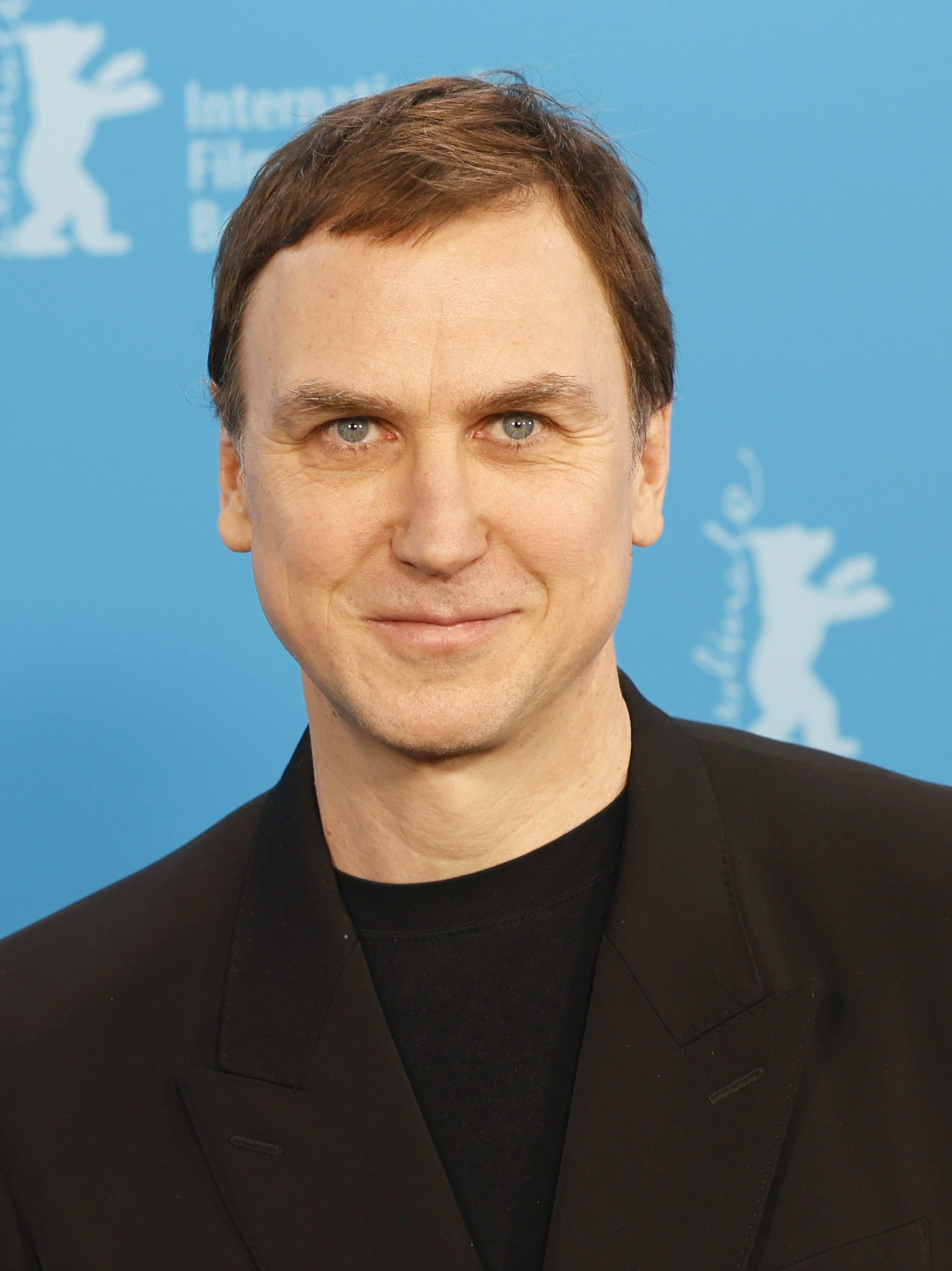
- Eidinger in 2026
- Born: 21 January 1976 (age 50); West Berlin, West Germany
- Occupation: Actor
- Years active: 1997–present
- Spouse: Ulrike Eidinger
- Children: 1

Lars Eidinger (German: [laʁs ˈaɪ̯dɪŋɐ]; born 21 January 1976) is a German actor and rapper, based in Berlin. He has appeared in German and international film and television productions, including the 2020 film My Little Sister, the German series Babylon Berlin (2017–2022), the 2023 American miniseries All the Light We Cannot See, and the 2024 film Dying.

== Early life, family and education ==
Lars Eidinger was born in 1975 or 1976 to an engineer and a nurse. He and his older brother were raised in West Berlin's Marienfelde district.

He is a graduate of the Ernst Busch Academy of Dramatic Arts, where he studied alongside Fritzi Haberlandt, Nina Hoss, Devid Striesow, and Mark Waschke.

== Career ==
=== Theatre ===
Eidinger started his career at Deutsches Theater in 1997. He became a salaried member of the Schaubühne ensemble in 1999 in Berlin, with leading roles in Thomas Ostermeier productions such as Hamlet and Richard III. He said that a significant moment in his career came while performing in a production of Troilus and Cressida directed by James Macdonald in 2005, when Macdonald told him to focus on "the words, just the words". It was not until he was rehearsing the "To be, or not to be" soliloquy for a production of Hamlet in 2008 that the meaning sunk in. The role of Hamlet is his favourite one, and in 2015 he estimated that over six years, he had played the role 250 times.

Eidinger has performed on stage in Australia several times: at the 2006 Adelaide Festival in a Schaubühne production of Nora (director Ostermeier's transformation of Henrik Ibsen's A Doll's House); in 2010, in Schaubühne's production of Hamlet for the Sydney Festival; and again to Adelaide in 2017.

In 2016, Ostermeier's Schaubühne production of Richard III was staged at the Edinburgh Festival, with Eidinger's performance described as "a mesmerising Richard – played like a seductive rock star gone to seed" by British theatre critic Lyn Gardner. Richard III, performed in German with English surtitles and occasional English expressions, was one of the opening acts at the 2017 Adelaide Festival, and played at the Brooklyn Academy of Music (BAM) in New York City in 2017.

He played Hamlet again in the Schaubühne production that toured to New York in 2022, in a short season at BAM.

Eidinger played Richard III again in a production by Marius von Mayenburg, staged at the Berliner Schaubühne in early 2026, directed by Thomas Ostermeier.

=== Screen ===
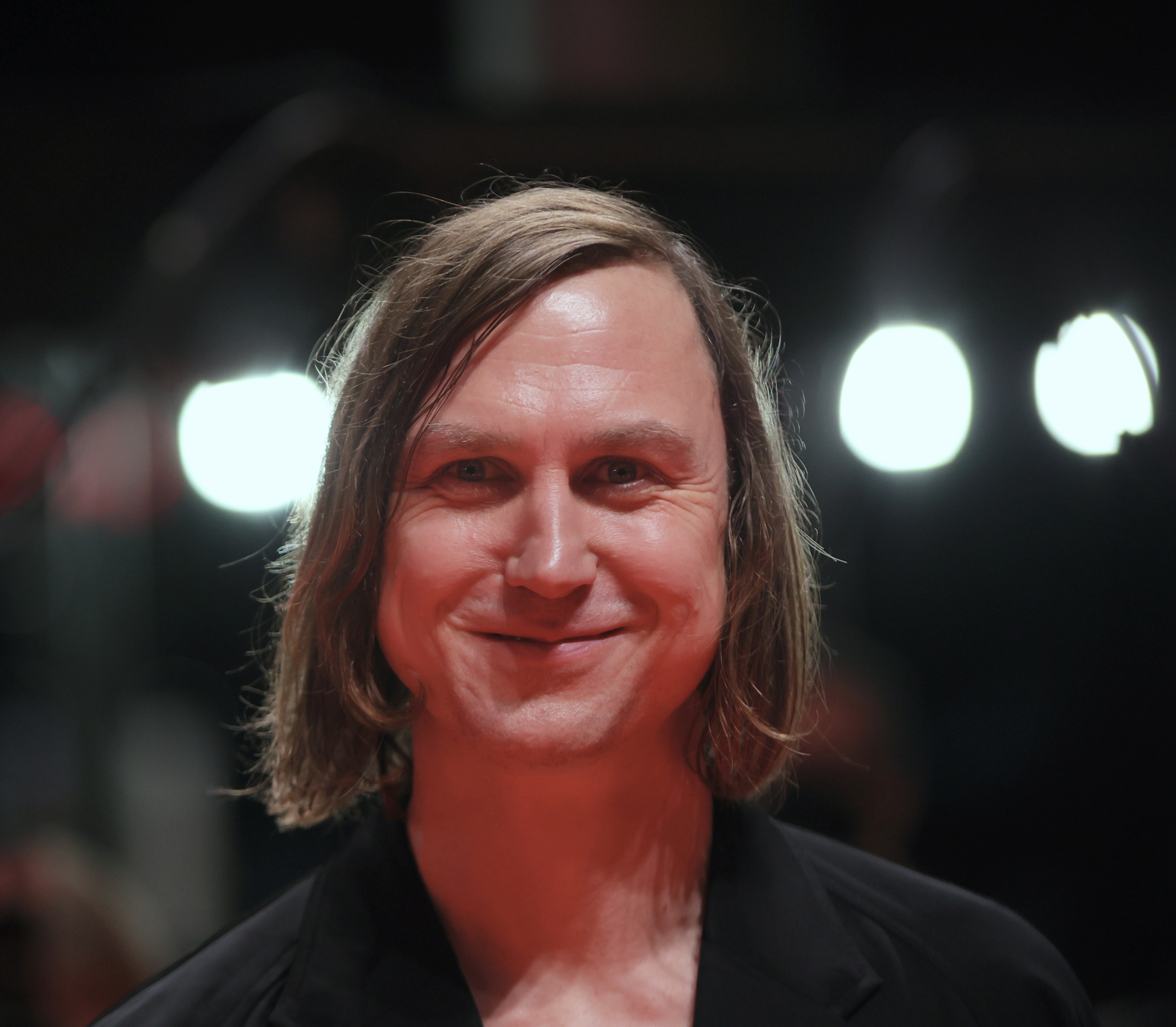
Eidinger in 2022

Eidinger appeared in several German TV series and films before coming to international notice. He acted in his first feature film, Everyone Else in 2007.

In 2014 he became known internationally for his role in Clouds of Sils Maria opposite Juliette Binoche and Kristen Stewart. Since then he has acted in many international productions, including Tim Burton's Dumbo (2019); Claire Denis's sci-fi horror film High Life; and the 2020 Swiss drama film My Little Sister as a famous actor suffering from cancer, opposite Nina Hoss. He is also known for the hit German neo-noir series Babylon Berlin (2017–2022). He worked with French filmmaker Olivier Assayas on Personal Shopper (2016), and the 2022 mini-series Irma Vep.

In 2022, he featured in Noah Baumbach's White Noise. In 2023 he starred in the Emmy-nominated American miniseries All the Light We Cannot See.

He plays the lead role in the 2024 film Dying, directed by Matthias Glasner, which premiered at the 62nd Berlin International Film Festival in February and went on to screen at the Sydney Film Festival and then the Adelaide Film Festival in October.

Eidinger appeared in a small role in Noah Baumbach's 2025 film Jay Kelly. He will portray Brainiac in James Gunn's DC Universe (DCU) film Man of Tomorrow (2027), the sequel to Superman (2025).

=== Music ===
Eidinger has been a musician and DJ as long as he has been an actor. In 1998, he released a trip-hop EP, I'll Break Ya Legg. In the early 2000s, when DJing at parties, he got a reputation for revealing his buttocks, in a gesture he said he got from the punk scene, which is "meant less as an affront and more as an expression of freedom, anarchy, and cockiness". However, after being photographed by a Bild reporter who published it on the front page of the newspaper, he stopped doing it. Around 2004, he started running what he called "autistic discos" in Berlin, playing eclectic pop.

He has played sets as DJ many times at the Viennale, including on 24 October 2024, along with DJ Rumi from Baires and filmmaker Arash T. Riahi. His sets often last several hours, combining "eclectic pop, rap, 80s, breakbeat, industrial bass, and techno".

== Other activities ==
In February 2016, Eidinger was a member of the jury for the main competition section of the 66th Berlin International Film Festival, chaired by Meryl Streep.

Eidinger was one of the first people to sign the Open Letter to the German Position on Russo-Ukrainian War in late April 2022, which demanded that Germany not support Ukraine with arms, in order to "prevent a third world war".

He enjoys doing photography, also directs plays, including an adaptation of Peer Gynt co-created with German artist John Bock.

== Personal life ==
Eidinger is married to opera singer Ulrike Eidinger. The couple has a daughter and lives in Berlin's Charlottenburg district.

== Selected filmography ==
=== Film ===
Year	Title	Role	Notes
2005	See You at Regis Debray	Andreas Baader	
2009	Everyone Else	Chris	
2011	Hell	Phillip	
2012	Goltzius and the Pelican Company	Quadfrey	
2012	Home for the Weekend	Marko Heidtmann	
2014	Clouds of Sils Maria	Klaus Diesterweg	
2015	Dora or the Sexual Neuroses of Our Parents	Peter	
2015	Sworn Virgin	Bernhard	
2015	Family Party	Max	
2016	The Origin of Violence	Dr. Erich Wagner	
2016	Personal Shopper	Ingo	
2016	The Bloom of Yesterday	Totila Blumen	
2017	Matilda	Nicholas II	
2018	Never Look Away	Exhibition Manager	
2018	High Life	Chandra	
2018	Cut Off	Jan Erik Sadler	
2018	Mack the Knife: Brecht's Threepenny Film	Bertolt Brecht	
2018	25 km/h	Christian	
2019	Proxima	Thomas	
2019	Dumbo	Hans Brugelbecker	
2019	All My Loving	Stefan Hoffmann	
2020	My Little Sister	Sven	
2020	Persian Lessons	Klaus Koch	
2022	About Joan	Tim Ardenne	
2022	White Noise	Mr. Gray	
2024	Dying	Tom Lunies	
2025	The Light	Tim Engels	
2025	Jay Kelly	The cyclist	
2026	The Blood Countess	Theobald Tandem	
2026	Moulin	Klaus Barbie	
2027	Man of Tomorrow †	Brainiac	Post-production

=== Television ===
- 2003: Berlin, Berlin (TV series, 1 episode)
- 2008: Großstadtrevier (TV series, 1 episode)
- 2010: Relations (TV film)
- 2010: Tatort: Hauch des Todes (TV series episode)
- 2012: Tatort: Borowski und der stille Gast (TV series episode)
- 2013: Foyle's War: Sunflower (TV series episode)
- 2013: Grenzgang (TV film)
- 2013: Polizeiruf 110: Der Tod macht Engel aus uns allen (TV series episode)
- 2013: Der Wagner-Clan. Eine Familiengeschichte (TV film)
- 2015: Tatort: Borowski und die Rückkehr des stillen Gastes (TV series episode)
- 2016: The Verdict (TV film)
- 2017: Shades of Guilt: Familie (TV series episode)
- 2017: SS-GB (miniseries)
- 2017: Sense8 (Netflix series, 4 episodes)
- 2017–2026: Babylon Berlin (TV series)
- 2019: M – Eine Stadt sucht einen Mörder (miniseries)
- 2020: Gott von Ferdinand von Schirach (TV film)
- 2021: Ich und die Anderen (miniseries)
- 2021: Faking Hitler (miniseries)
- 2021: Tatort: Borowski und der gute Mensch (TV series episode)
- 2021: Tatort: Murot und das Prinzip Hoffnung (TV series episode)
- 2022: Irma Vep (miniseries)
- 2023: All the Light We Cannot See (Netflix limited miniseries)

=== Music videos ===
- 2014: Herbert Grönemeyer - Morgen
- 2017: Love Hotel Band - Diamant
- 2018: Drangsal - Eine Geschichte/Und Du?
- 2019: Deichkind - Richtig gutes Zeug
- 2019: Deichkind - Wer sagt denn das?
- 2019: Deichkind - Keine Party
- 2019: Deichkind - Dinge
