= The Blood Countess (film) =

2026 vampire comedy horror film by Ulrike Ottinger

- International promotional poster
- German: Die Blutgräfin
- Directed by: Ulrike Ottinger
- Written by: Ulrike Ottinger; Elfriede Jelinek
- Produced by: Alexander Dumreicher-Ivanceanu; Bady Minck; Bettina Brokemper
- Starring: Isabelle Huppert; Birgit Minichmayr
- Cinematography: Martin Gschlacht
- Edited by: Pia Dumont
- Music by: Wolfgang Mitterer
- Production companies: Amour Fou Vienna; Amour Fou Luxembourg; Heimatfilm; Ulrike Ottinger Filmproduktion
- Distributed by: Neue Visionen Filmverleih (Germany)
- Release date: 16 February 2026 (BIFF)
- Running time: 119 minutes
- Countries: Austria; Luxembourg; Germany
- Languages: German; French

The Blood Countess (German: Die Blutgräfin) is a 2026 vampire comedy film directed by Ulrike Ottinger, co-written by Ottinger and Elfriede Jelinek and loosely based on the mythology surrounding the Hungarian countess Elizabeth Báthory. It stars Isabelle Huppert as Báthory, alongside Birgit Minichmayr, Thomas Schubert, Lars Eidinger and André Jung.

The film had its world premiere at the Berlinale Special Gala section of the 76th Berlin International Film Festival on 16 February 2026.

== Plot ==
The story follows Countess Erzsébet Báthory, who reappears in present‑day Vienna and searches for a mysterious book believed to have the power to eradicate evil. Accompanied by her maid Hermine and her melancholic nephew Rudi Bubi, she moves through historical sites in the city while vampirologists and a police inspector pursue her across Vienna and into Bohemia.

== Cast ==
- Isabelle Huppert as Elizabeth Báthory
- Birgit Minichmayr as Hermine
- Thomas Schubert as Rudi Bubi
- Lars Eidinger as Theobald Tandem
- André Jung as Theobastus Bombastus
- Karl Markovics as Inspector Unglaube
- Conchita Wurst as Master of Ceremonies

== Release ==
The Blood Countess had its North American Premiere at Fantastic Fest on September 17, 2026. Strand Releasing acquired North American sales rights of the film before its North American Premiere.

== Reception ==
On review aggregator website Rotten Tomatoes, the film holds an approval rating of 86% based on 14 reviews, with an average rating of 6.2/10.
