= Taking Sides (film) =

2001 film by István Szabó

- German film poster
- Directed by: István Szabó
- Written by: Ronald Harwood (play and screenplay)
- Produced by: Yves Pasquier
- Starring: Harvey Keitel; Stellan Skarsgård; Moritz Bleibtreu; Birgit Minichmayr; Ulrich Tukur; Oleg Tabakov; R. Lee Ermey
- Cinematography: Lajos Koltai
- Edited by: Sylvie Landra
- Release dates: 13 September 2001 (Toronto International Film Festival); 16 February 2002 (Germany); 30 April 2002 (France); 21 November 2003 (UK)
- Countries: Germany; France; Austria; UK
- Languages: English (UK/US version); German and English (international version)

Taking Sides (German title Taking Sides – Der Fall Furtwängler, i. e. The Furtwängler Case) is a 2001 German-French-Austrian-British biographical drama film directed by István Szabó and starring Harvey Keitel and Stellan Skarsgård. The story is set during the period of denazification investigations conducted in post-war Germany after the Second World War, and it is based on the real interrogations that took place between a U.S. Army investigator and the musical conductor Wilhelm Furtwängler, who had been charged with serving the Nazi regime. It is based on the 1995 play of the same title by Ronald Harwood.

The film was shot on location in Germany with the dialogue in German and English, although in the version released in the US and the UK the dialogue is only in English.

== Plot ==
In Berlin at the end of World War II, Wilhelm Furtwängler (Stellan Skarsgård) is conducting Beethoven's 5th Symphony when yet another Allied air raid stops the performance. A minister in the Nazi government comes to Furtwängler's dressing room to advise him that he should go abroad, and escape the war. The film then jumps to some time after the Allied victory. U.S. Army General Wallace (R. Lee Ermey) tells Major Steve Arnold (Harvey Keitel) to "get" Furtwängler at his denazification hearing: "Find Wilhelm Furtwängler guilty. He represents everything that was rotten in Germany".

Arnold gets an office with Lieutenant David Wills (Moritz Bleibtreu), a German-American Jew, and Emmaline Straube (Birgit Minichmayr), daughter of an executed member of the German resistance. Arnold questions several musicians, many of whom know Emmaline's father and say that Furtwängler refused to give Hitler the Nazi salute. Arnold begins interrogating Furtwängler, asking why he didn't leave Germany in 1933 like so many other musicians. Why he had played for Hitler's birthday? Why he had played at a Nazi rally? Why his recording of Anton Bruckner's 7th Symphony was used on the radio after Hitler's death? Arnold gets a second violinist to tell him about Furtwängler's womanizing and the conductor's professional jealousy of Herbert von Karajan.

In a subplot, Arnold is assisted by a young Jewish U.S. Army lieutenant. The young officer begins to have sympathy for the conductor, as does the young German woman who works as a clerk in their office. This causes friction between Arnold and his subordinates. In a voice-over, Arnold explains that Furtwängler was exonerated at the later hearings but boasts that his questioning "winged" him. Footage of the real Furtwängler shows him shaking hands with Propaganda Minister Joseph Goebbels after a concert. The conductor surreptitiously wipes his hands with a cloth after touching the Nazi.

== Cast ==
- Harvey Keitel as Major Steve Arnold
- Stellan Skarsgård as Wilhelm Furtwängler
- Moritz Bleibtreu as Lieutenant David Wills
- Birgit Minichmayr as Emmi Straube
- Ulrich Tukur as Helmut Alfred Rode, 2nd violinist
- Oleg Tabakov as Colonel Dymshitz
- Hanns Zischler as Rudolf Otto Werner, oboist
- Armin Rohde as Schlee, timpanist
- R. Lee Ermey as General Wallace
- August Zirner as Captain Ed Martin
- Daniel White as Sergeant Adams
- Thomas Thieme as Reichsminister
- Franck Leboeuf as French aide

== Historical basis ==
Even though many prominent contemporary German artists left, Furtwängler did not leave Germany in 1933 after Adolf Hitler took power. He played at numerous concerts attended by Nazi officials. A recording of the Adagio of Bruckner's 7th Symphony was even played after the announcement of the death of Hitler. In 1945, he eventually went to Switzerland after playing a concert in Vienna. These facts, compounded by circumstances of the denazification hearings, caused Furtwängler's case to be significantly delayed.

Furtwängler was specifically charged with supporting Nazism by remaining in Germany, performing at Nazi party functions and with making an anti-Semitic remark against the part-Jewish conductor Victor de Sabata. He was eventually cleared on all these counts.

To the criticism of both movie critics and American audiences of depicting the American Denazification officer Maj. Steve Arnolds (Harvey Keitel) as a "caricature, a bully, a Philistine", screenplay writer Ronald Harwood told The Jewish Journal that he went on to comb archives for denazification transcripts and to interview officials who had supervised such proceedings."They were morally brutal," Hardwood stated. "They bullied people, and they did behave in an extreme way. But they had just seen the camps, and no one in the world had seen that before."

== Reception ==
Roger Ebert gave the film 3 stars out of 4 and found the film "both interesting and unsatisfying. The Keitel performance is over the top.... There are maddening lapses, as when Furtwängler's rescue of Jewish musicians is mentioned but never really made clear. But Skarsgård's performance is poignant; it has a kind of exhausted passivity, suggesting a man who once stood astride the world and now counts himself lucky to be insulted by the likes of Major Arnold."

Stephen Holden of the New York Times also gave the film a positive review, saying that "Sparked by the actors' powerful performances, Arnold's moral absolutism and Furtwängler's lofty aestheticism make for a dramatically compelling clash."

The film has 73% approval rating at the Rotten Tomatoes based on 55 reviews.
