= György Enyedi (geographer) =

Hungarian economist and geographer (1930–2012)

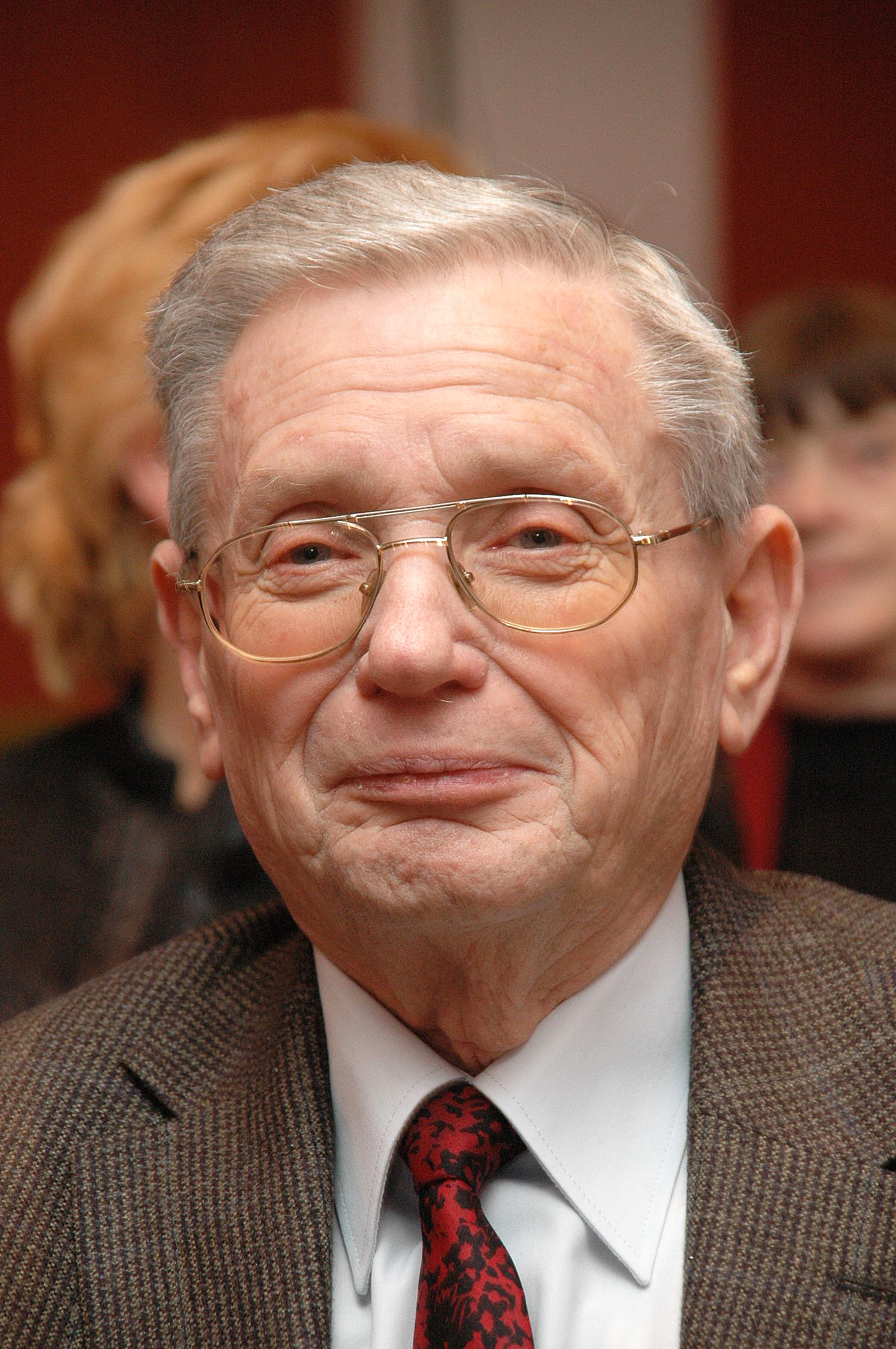
- Born: 25 August 1930; Budapest, Hungary
- Died: 10 September 2012 (aged 82); Budapest, Hungary
- Education: Corvinus University of Budapest
- Occupations: geographer, economist, the father of regional science in Hungary
- Children: Ildikó Enyedi

György Enyedi (25 August 1930 – 10 September 2012) was an economist and geographer who has played a major role in the long-term development of regional science. Enyedi was a decisive figure in the rapid development of integrative spatial sciences, regional science in the second part of the 20th century.

== Scientific career ==
His first studies during the 60's in agricultural and rural typology revealed the negative consequences of the transformation of the Hungarian settlement system with the social and economic inequalities of rural space. He continued his research career on international scale.

He was the leader of a worldwide comparative research team of the International Geographical Union, studying the development of rural space between 1972 and 1984. He led a high number of international research projects. In 1984 he founded the Centre for Regional Studies of the Hungarian Academy of Sciences. Today the centre is the leading organization of Hungarian regional science with a staff of one hundred researchers in four institutes, with a profile of analyses of European and Hungarian regional development.

== Achievements ==
- Author of 40 books and of more than 300 other publications.
- Member of the Hungarian Academy of Sciences (1999 - 2005 vice president).
- Vice-president of the International Geographical Union (1984–1992)
- President of the Hungarian committee of UNESCO (1998–2002)
- Editor-in-chief of the periodic "Hungarian Science". He was visiting scholar in various leading US and French universities and has spent altogether seven years lecturing in different countries.
- He is an honorary member of seven foreign geographical societies, member of the Academia Europaea in London and member of the editorial board of several international journals; he is the recipient of several Hungarian and international awards and honors.

== Main publications ==
- Hungary: An Economic Geography Boulder (1976)
- Kelet-Közép-Európa gazdasági földrajza (1978)
- Földrajz és társadalom (1983)
- Az urbanizációs ciklus és a magyar településhálózat átalakulása : akadémiai székfoglaló 1982. december 6. (1984)
- A városnövekedés szakaszai (1988)
- Budapest – A Central European Capital (with Viktória Szirmai, 1992)
- Regional Processes in Hungary (1996)
- Social Change and Urban Restructuring in Central Europe (1998)

== Sources ==
Based on the text of Gyula Horváth Hungarian Quarterly volume XLII nr.161 Spring 2001
