= Ildikó Enyedi =

Hungarian film director and screenwriter

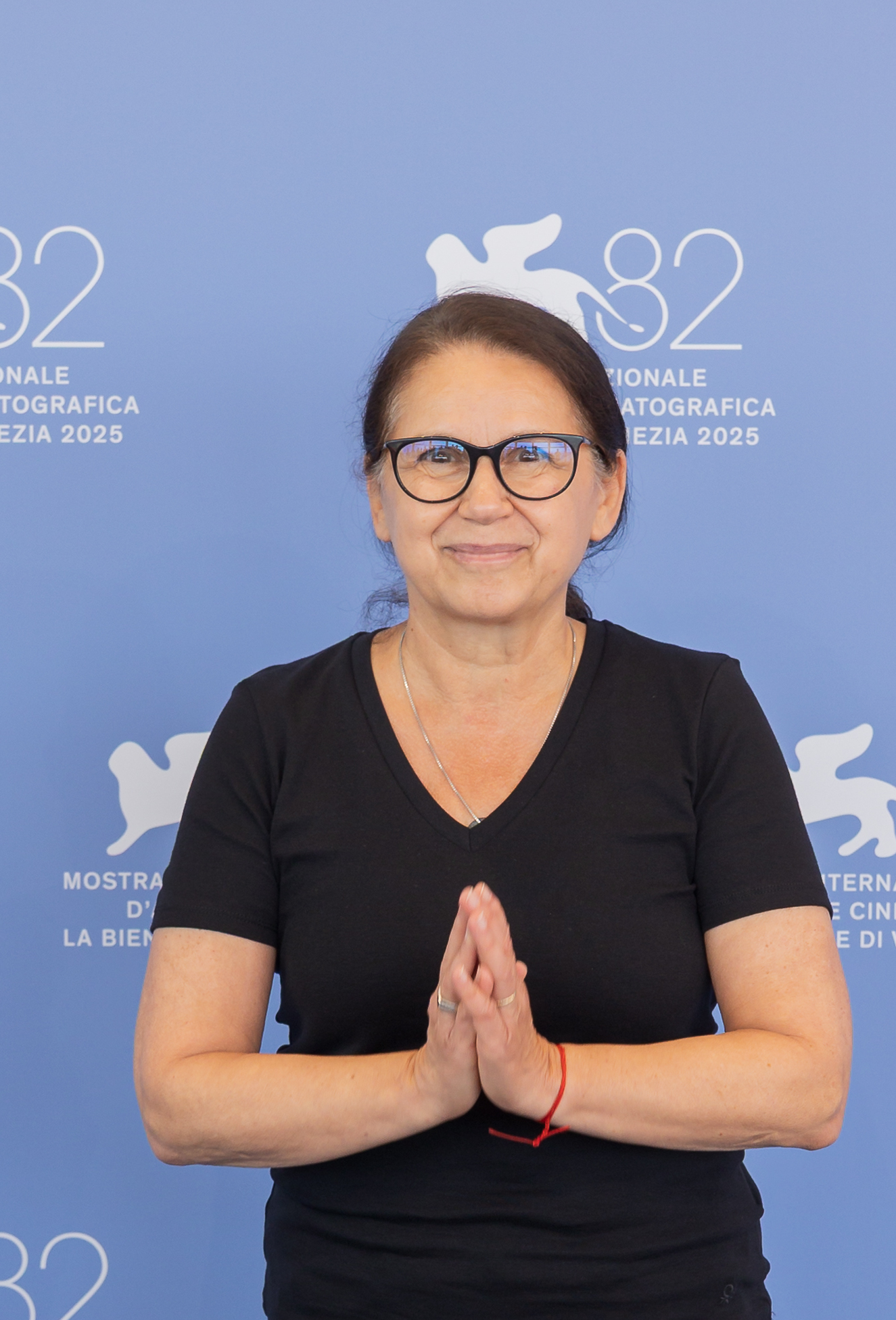
- Enyedi in 2025
- Born: 15 November 1955 (age 70); Budapest, Hungary
- Occupations: Film director, screenwriter
- Years active: 1989–present
- Parent: György Enyedi

Ildikó Enyedi (Note: Hungarian pronunciation: [ˈildikoː ˈɛɲɛdi]) (born 15 November 1955) is a Hungarian film director and screenwriter. She is best known for directing On Body and Soul, which won the Golden Bear at the 67th Berlin International Film Festival, among other awards, including a nomination for the Academy Award for Best Foreign Language Film, representing Hungary.

== Early life and education ==
Enyedi was born in Budapest in 1955. Her father, György Enyedi, was a geographer and economist who played a major role in the long-term development of regional science. She completed a B.A. in economics, studied film studies at the Academy of Drama and Film in Budapest starting in 1980, and also studied film in Montpellier. In the beginning, Enyedi created conceptual art and was a part of Balázs Béla Studio and the Indigo group.

== Career ==
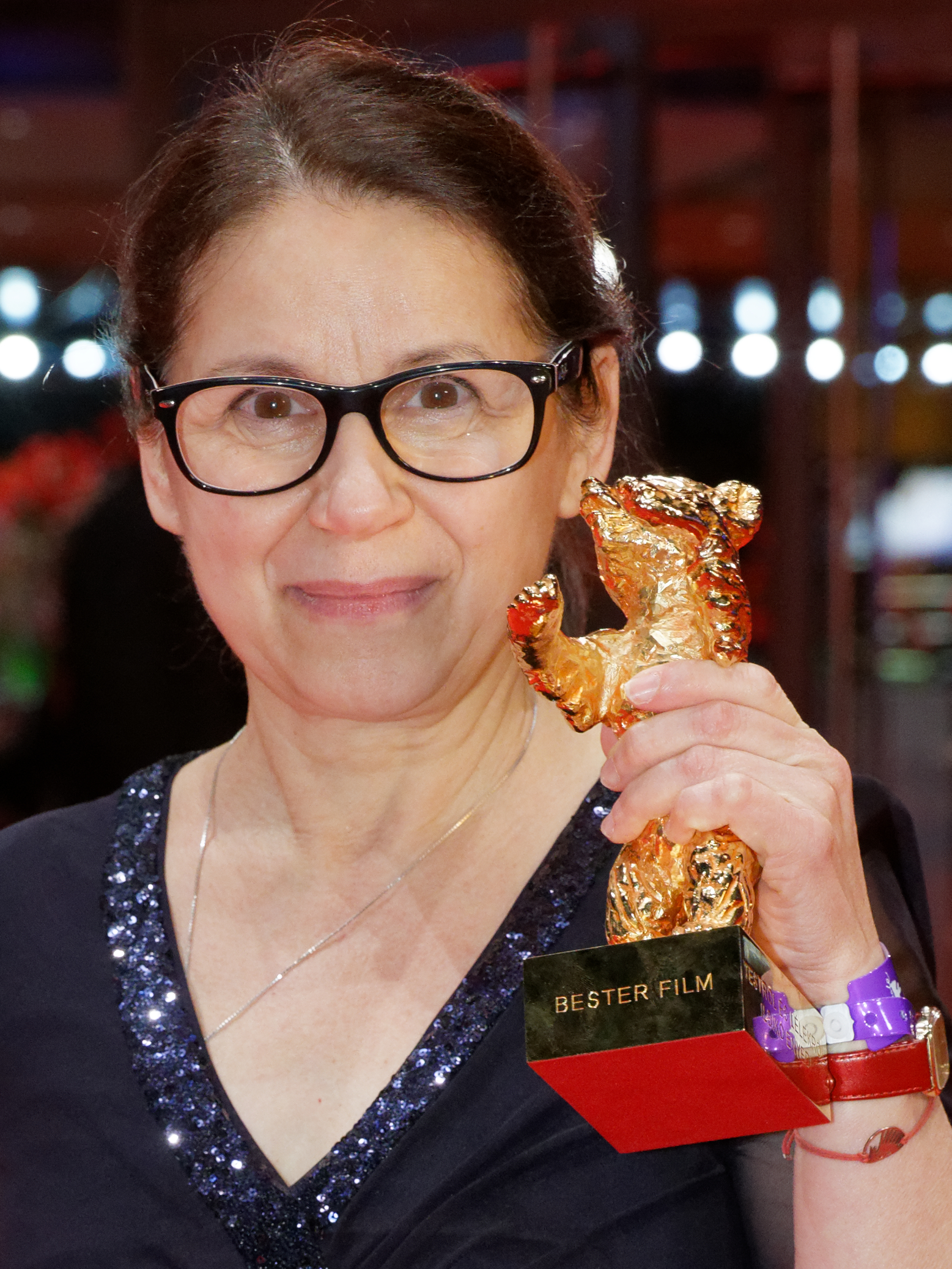
Enyedi in 2017 with her Golden Bear award for the film On Body and Soul

Enyedi won the Golden Camera award for My 20th Century at the 1989 Cannes Film Festival. She began teaching at Academy of Drama and Film in Budapest (now known as the University of Theatre and Film Arts) that same year. In 1992, she was a member of the jury at the 42nd Berlin International Film Festival. Her 1994 film Magic Hunter was entered into the main competition at the 51st edition of the Venice Film Festival. In 2007, she was a member of the jury at the 29th Moscow International Film Festival. She received her doctorate from the University of Theatre and Film Arts in 2011.

In 2012 Enyedi was hired by HBO Europe to direct the Hungarian show Terápia, an adaptation of the Israeli show BeTipul about a therapist who spends his week helping others before getting his own psychological help. Enyedi described the project as "healing" after years of projects stuck in development hell. In total Enyedi directed 39 episodes over three seasons from 2012 to 2017.

Enyedi's 2017 film On Body and Soul premiered at the 67th Berlin International Film Festival, where it won the Golden Bear. The film was nominated for the Academy Award for Best Foreign Language Film, representing Hungary.

In 2018, she announced her next film would be an adaptation of The Story of My Wife, about a man who makes a bet with his friend to marry the next woman who walks into the café where they are eating. The film was adapted from a novel by Milán Füst of the same name.

She was previously the president of the Hungarian Directors' Guild.

In April 2023, Ildikó Enyedi was announced as the president of Short Film and La Cinef jury at the 76th Festival de Cannes.

In 2024, Enyedi was appointed Jury member at the 2024 Tokyo International Film Festival for its international competition section.

== Personal life ==
Enyedi is married to author Wilhelm Droste, has two children, and lives in Budapest and Nordrhein Westfalen, Germany. In 2002 she was awarded with the Officer's Cross of the Order of Merit.

== Filmography ==
=== Feature films ===
Year	English title	Original title	Notes
1989	My 20th Century	Az én XX. századom	Caméra d'Or winner - 1989 Cannes Film Festival
1994	Magic Hunter	Bűvös vadász	
1997	Tamas and Juli	Tamás és Juli	
1999	Simon, the Magician	Simon mágus	
2017	On Body and Soul	Testről és lélekről	Golden Bear winner - 67th Berlin International Film Festival
2021	The Story of My Wife	A feleségem története	
2025	Silent Friend	Stiller Freund	

=== Short films ===
- The Spectator (1981)
- Rózsalovag (1984)
- New Books (1985)
- Mole (1985)
- Invasion (1986)
- Goblins (1988)
- Európából Európába (2004)
- Első szerelem (2008)

== Awards and nominations ==
Year	Title	Category	Title	Result	Notes
2017	Berlin film festival	Golden Bear	On Body and Soul	Won	
2017	Sydney Film Festival	Sydney Film Prize	On Body and Soul	Won	
2018	Academy Awards	Best International Feature Film	On Body and Soul	Nominated	
