= Milán Füst =

Hungarian writer, poet and playwright

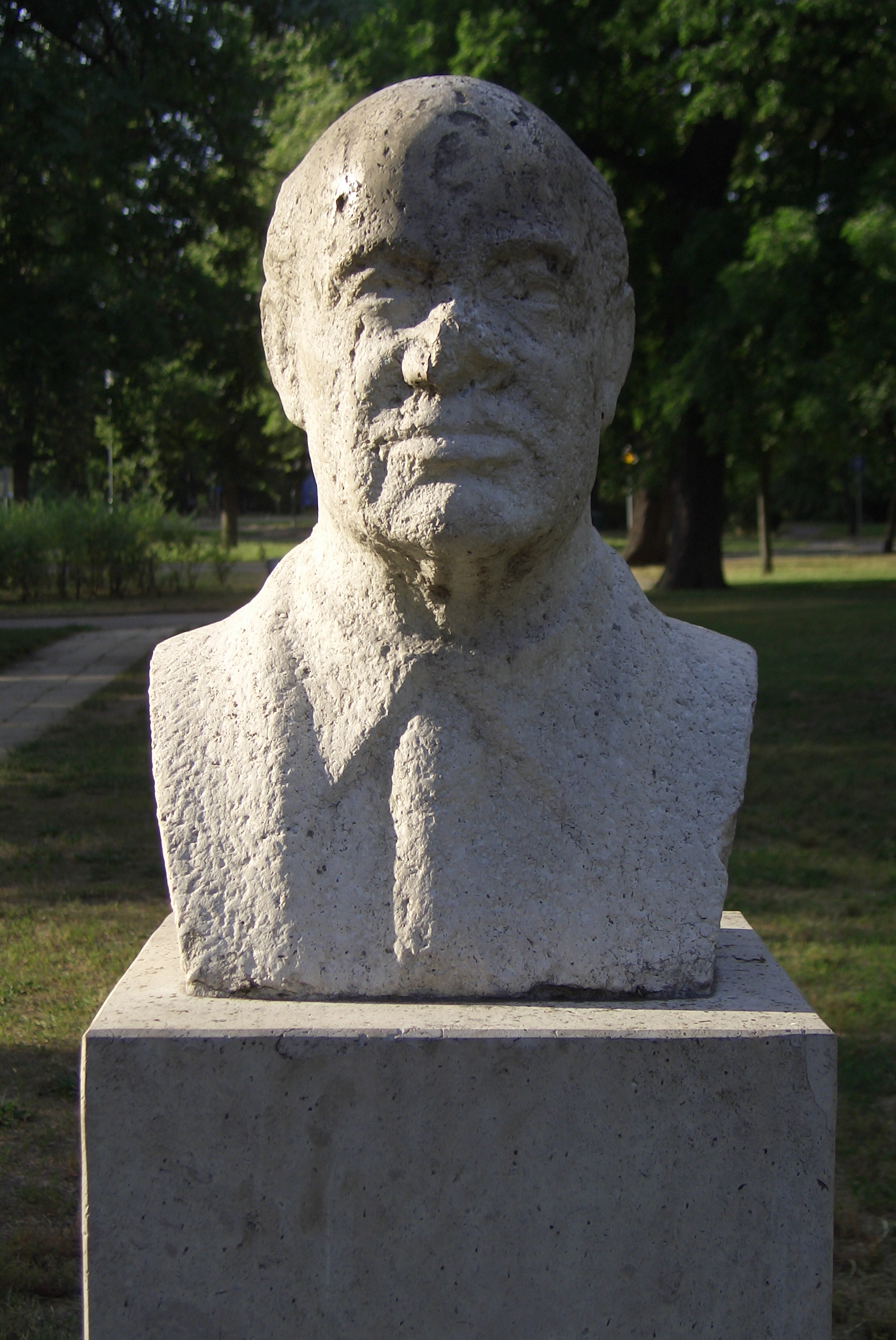
Bust of Milán Füst in Budapest

Milán Füst (17 July 1888, Budapest – 26 July 1967, Budapest) was a Hungarian writer, poet and playwright.

== Biography ==
Early in life, his family lived on Dohány utca in the 7th district of Budapest.

In 1908 he met the writer Ernő Osvát and published his first work in the literary revue Nyugat. He befriended Dezső Kosztolányi and Frigyes Karinthy. After studying law and economics in Budapest, he became a teacher in a school of business. In 1918, he became the director of Vörösmarty Academy, but was forced to leave the post in 1921.

In 1928, a nervous breakdown led him to spend six months in a sanatorium in Baden-Baden. Already since 1904 he had begun working on his long Journal. However, a large part of this work, concerning the period 1944-1945 would later be destroyed.

In 1947, he became a teacher at Képzőművészeti Főiskola. He received the Kossuth Prize in 1948, and was a considered a contender for the 1965 Nobel Prize. His best-known novel, A feleségem története (The Story of My Wife), was published in 1942.
