= Valeska Grisebach =

German film director

- Grisebach in 2023
- Born: 4 January 1968 (age 58); Bremen, West Germany
- Years active: 2001–present

Valeska Grisebach (born 4 January 1968) is a German film director. She was born in Bremen. She is considered part of the Berlin School of filmmaking, and is most known for her drama films Western (2017) and The Dreamed Adventure (2026).

== Biography ==
Valeska Grisebach studied German literature and philosophy in Berlin, Munich, and Vienna before beginning film studies in Vienna.

Grisebach's diploma film Be My Star (Mein Stern) was honored by the FIPRESCI Prize jury at the 2001 Toronto International Film Festival, as well winning as the prize for Best Feature Film at the Turin Film Festival.

In 2006, her second film Longing debuted in competition at the 56th Berlin International Film Festival.

Her third film Western premiered at the Un Certain Regard section of the 2017 Cannes Film Festival.

Grisebach's The Dreamed Adventure had its world premiere at the main competition of the 2026 Cannes Film Festival, where it won the Jury Prize.

== Personal life ==
Valeska Grisebach's sister is the actress Anna Grisebach.

== Filmography ==
Year	English Title	Original Title	Notes
2001	Be My Star	Mein Stern	
2006	Longing	Sehnsucht	
2017	Western		Also producer
2026	The Dreamed Adventure	Das geträumte Abenteuer	

== Awards ==
- 2001: First Steps Award for Be My Star
- 2001: Prize for Best Feature Film at the Turin Film Festival for Be My Star
- 2001: International Critics’ Award at the Toronto International Film Festival for Be My Star
- 2006: Special Jury Award at the Festival Internacional de Cine Independiente in Buenos Aires
- 2006: Special Jury Award at the Warsaw International Film Festival for Longing
- 2006: Film Prize at the Festival of German Film for Longing
- 2017: Film Prize at the Festival of German Film for Western
- 2018: German Film Prize in Bronze for Western (Best Feature)
- 2026: Cannes Film Festival Jury Prize for The Dreamed Adventure
