= Berlin School (filmmaking) =

Art movement in cinema

Berlin School is a term used for a new movement in German films that has emerged in the early 21st century. The German term Berliner Schule has been applied to a number of intimate German films that received critical acknowledgement, first in France.

A circle of directors of penetrating, realistic studies of relationships and characters informally constitutes the Berlin School. Among these directors are Christian Petzold, Christoph Hochhäusler and Angela Schanelec.

== Definition ==
The older directors of the Berliner Schule – Christian Petzold, Thomas Arslan and Angela Schanelec – started filmmaking in the early 1990s. At that time they started to develop the aesthetics of what is now called the Berliner Schule. In 1998, the directors Benjamin Heisenberg, Christoph Hochhäusler and Sebastian Kutzli founded the film magazine Revolver in Munich. They published interviews with certain directors and opened a new discourse about filmmaking aesthetics.

In 2003, the film Milchwald (This Very Moment) by Christoph Hochhäusler was shown at the Berlinale. In 2004, the film Marseille by Angela Schanelec was shown at the Cannes Film Festival. Both films garnered critical acclaim from French film reviewers in Cahiers du cinéma and Le Monde. The French press called the phenomenon the Nouvelle Vague Allemande, while the German press and German audiences initially ignored it. Later they called it the Berliner Schule. This term works as a marketing label, but the films subsumed under that label are very diverse.

The majority of the Berliner Schule directors studied at the Deutsche Film- und Fernsehakademie Berlin (dffb) and got to know each other there. But the Berliner Schule is not specifically a Berlin-based phenomenon. Christoph Hochhäusler studied at the Hochschule für Fernsehen und Film in Munich, Henner Winckler and Ulrich Köhler studied at the Hochschule für bildende Künste Hamburg, and Valeska Grisebach studied at the Filmacademy Vienna. Some of the directors work together (Revolver), while some of them don't know each other personally or reject any Berlin School collectivism.

== Discourse ==
The now Berlin-based Revolver is the biannual organ of the Berliner Schule directors. It is published by Jens Börner, Benjamin Heisenberg, Christoph Hochhäusler, Franz Müller, Nicolas Wackerbarth and Saskia Walker. This periodical develops and represents the filmmakers' Berliner Schule discourse. The Revolver group organizes film-related events, including panels, screenings and discussions. Young German directors and experienced international directors are presented and contribute to the discourse. For instance, American Mumblecore director Andrew Bujalski was invited for a workshop discussion in January 2012. A new generation of prospective Berlin School directors was presented by the Revolver crew in May 2012: Jessica Krummacher (Totem), Hannes Lang (Peak), Maximilian Linz (Das Oberhausener Gefühl) and Timo Müller (Morscholz).

The Revolver group published an anthology that is important in cinema discourse, Kino muss gefährlich sein (Cinema Must Be Dangerous). The anthology contains interviews with influential directors, translated discussions and manifestos, as well as texts by Berliner Schule directors and their colleagues. Contributors include Maren Ade, Barbara Albert, Jens Börner, Jean-Claude Carrière, Katrin Cartlidge, Patrice Chéreau, Jacques Doillon, Jean Douchet, Christopher Doyle, Bruno Dumont, Harun Farocki, Helmut Färber, Dominik Graf, Michael Haneke, Jessica Hausner, Benjamin Heisenberg, Werner Herzog, Christoph Hochhäusler, Romuald Karmakar, Wong Kar-Wai, Abbas Kiarostami, Roland Klick, Alexander Kluge, Harmony Korine, Peter Kubelka, Noémie Lvovsky, Jonas Mekas, Christian Petzold, Jacques Rivette, Eric Rohmer, Ulrich Seidl, Angela Schanelec, Lars von Trier, Jeff Wall and others.

The films of the Berlin School have sometimes been criticized on the grounds that they are "brittle", "slow", or "lacking narrative impetus", criticisms echoed by German director Oskar Roehler, who has said of Berlin School films, "they are always slow, always depressing, nothing is ever really said in them [...] they are always well thought of and have an audience of between five and ten thousand". An implicit criticism is the lack of mainstream accessibility and commercial viability of the films, concerns which German director Dominik Graf has also shared about New German Cinema.

== Bibliography ==
- Revolver website [German]
- Rüdiger Suchsland: Langsames Leben, schöne Tage. Annäherungen an die „Berliner Schule“. In: film-dienst. 13 (2005).
- Michael Baute, Ekkehard Knörer, Volker Pantenburg, Stefan Pethke, Simon Rothöhler: “Berliner Schule” – Eine Collage. In: kolik.film. Special Edition 6 (October 2006); (version with interesting hints by Rüdiger Suchsland)
- Cathy Rohnke: Die Schule, die keine ist – Reflektionen über die „Berliner Schule“. on the website of Goethe-Instituts (December 2006)
- Ekkehard Knörer: Long Shots, Luminous Days. Notes on the New German Cinema. In: Vertigo Magazine. April 2007. (overview over Berliner Schule)
- Marco Abel: Intensifying Life: The Cinema of 'Berlin School. In: Cineaste. 33.4 (Fall 2008)
- Marco Abel. "The Counter-Cinema of the Berlin School." Rochester: Camden House, 2013. ISBN 9781571134387.
- Berliner Schule. Documentary by Lluna Abeil (nanafilms, 90 minutes, 2011)
- Adam Szymanski. Cinemas of Therapeutic Activism: Depression and the Politics of Existence. Amsterdam University Press, 2020. ISBN 9789463723121.
- Good Bye Fassbinder ! Le cinéma allemand depuis la réunification. Documentary by Pierre Gras. Editions Jacqueline Chambon (2011)
