= List of New Wave movements =

New Wave may refer to various artistic movements in film, music and literature. These include:

== Movements in film ==
- The New Wave, French New Wave, or Nouvelle Vague, the inaugural New Wave cinema movement
- Australian New Wave
- Austrian New Wave
- Indian New Wave, or Parallel cinema
- Japanese New Wave, or Nuberu Bagu, which also developed around the same time as the French Nouvelle Vague
- Persian New Wave, or Iranian New Wave, started in the 1960s
- New German Cinema, new wave of German cinema
- Berlin School (filmmaking), also Known as Nouvelle Vague Allemand, second new wave of German cinema
- New Nigerian Cinema, also known as Nigerian New Wave
- Czechoslovak New Wave
- Cinema Novo or Novo Cinema, a movement in Brazilian and Portuguese film
- Hong Kong New Wave, a movement in Hong Kong film led by Tsui Hark
- Philippine New Wave, also known as Filipino New Wave or Contemporary Philippine Cinema
- Romanian New Wave
- British New Wave
- Taiwan New Wave
- Thai New Wave
- Toronto New Wave
- New Hollywood, also known as the American New Wave
- New generation (Malayalam film movement), new wave of Indian Malayalam cinema
- Mexican ('Nuevo Cine Mexicano')

== Movements in music ==
- Bossa nova a genre of Brazilian music (while it is commonly translated as "new wave", the word "bossa" originally means "small elevation on a surface" like the bump on a camel's back or a lump resulting from a blow, and more informally "bossa" came to mean "a way, a quality" of doing something with grace, that makes you stand out)
- New wave music, in the United Kingdom, the United States and various enclaves in the late 1970s and through the 1980s
- New wave of British heavy metal
- New wave of American heavy metal
- New wave of traditional heavy metal
- New Wave revival
- Neue Deutsche Welle, the German new wave music movement in the late 1970s and early 1980s
- Yugoslav new wave, a.k.a. Novi val, Novi talas or Nov bran, the new wave scene in Yugoslavia in the late 1970s and early 1980s
- Nueva ola, a form of Spanish language popular music inspired on the musical developments of US and Europe in the 1950s and 1960s
- Onda Nueva, a type of Venezuelan jazz/classical music, founded by Aldemaro Romero
- Eurodisco, referred to by the Vietnamese-American communities as "new wave" music.

== Movements in literature ==
- New Wave science fiction, a movement in the 1960s and 1970s
- New Wave (manga), a movement in manga in the late 1970s and early 1980s

== Multidisciplinary movements ==
- Ukrainian New Wave

== See also ==
- List of art movements
