= Oliver Broumis =

German actor (born 1964)

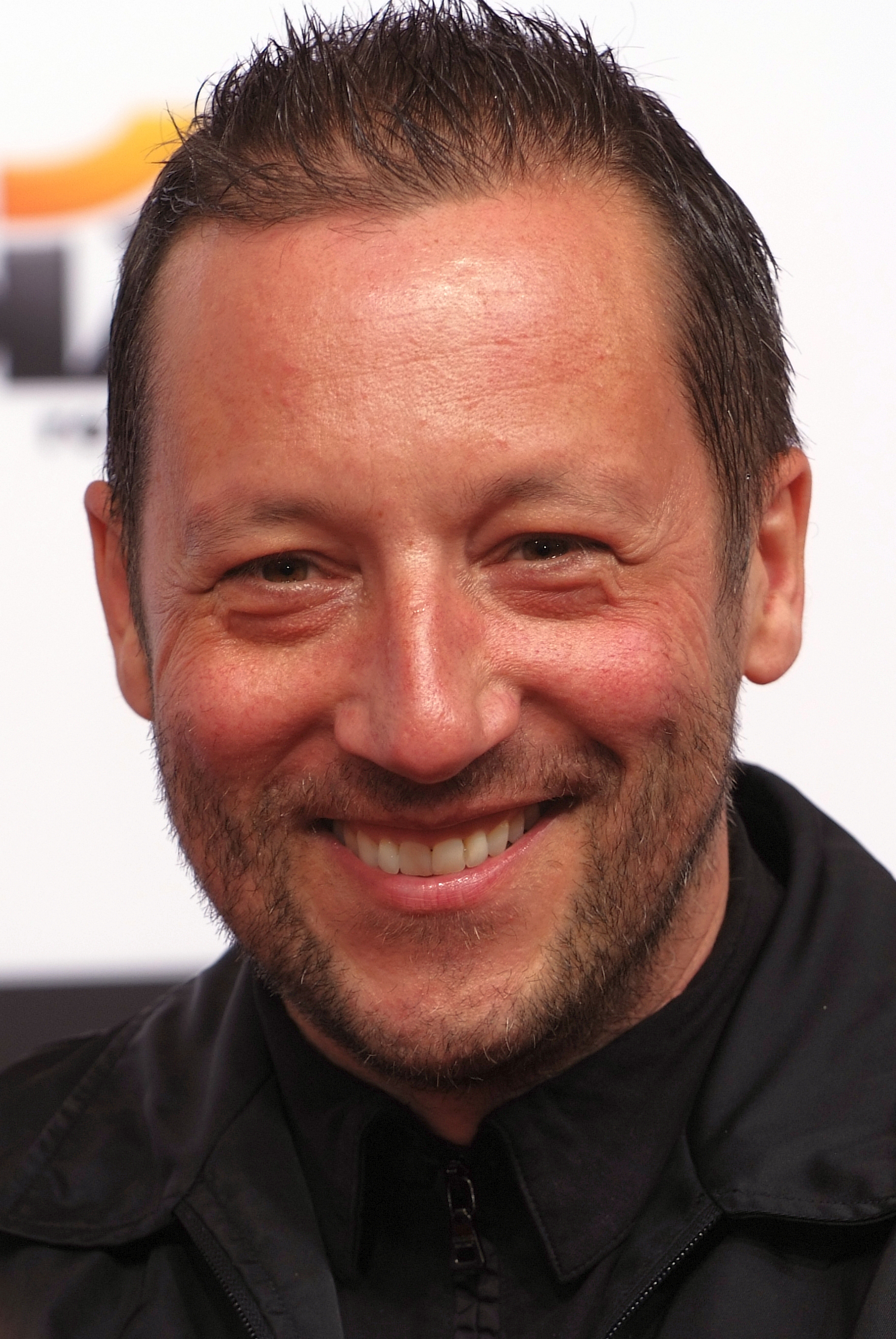
Oliver Broumis (2012)

Oliver Broumis (born 31 July 1964, in Hanover, West Germany) is a German actor.

== Biography ==
Right after College he went to the Hamburg University of Music and Dramatic arts for a 4 years education in acting. Since then, he also did a lot of training in Los Angeles with M. K. Lewis (Film Tech), Sam Christensen (S. Chr. Process) and Frank Betzelt, Berlin (Meisner technique). He began his professional life with the German/Swiss film "Immer & Ewig" a.k.a. "Always & Forever", a modern version of the Jean-Paul Sartre play "Les Jeux sont faits" a.k.a. "The Game is over". At the same time he also started in theaters all over Germany with plays of Shakespeare, Goethe and others.

Through the war movies Stalingrad and Hasenjagd a.k.a. The Quality of Mercy, he discovered his fondness and ability to play emotionally disturbed and volatile characters.

In 2002 his interest in film politics made him one of the co-founders of the "film.lounge.berlin", a meeting and networking spot for the Berlin film industry.

In 2004 he played the German zoologist and wild life activist Bernhard Grzimek who was responsible for the conservation of natural world heritage like the Tanzanian Serengeti National Park. As a boy of 4 years he grew up with Bernhard Grzimek's monthly TV show and he decided to become this fighting man – 3 decades later that happened.

Also in 2004 he produced the documentary "Zwischen Kopf und Himmel" of a young first time director. It is a movie about the life of women in East Africa.

In 2005 he was a Presenter at the European Film Awards under the direction of Pepe Danquart.

He is working with a German director on the script of "Rigby". A film about death and the process of dying. The story explores the question if you are able to live in the presence of your own mortality and transience, what benefits for your life you will get out of it ?! For research he worked a few weeks in a local hospice. He will also play the main part in the film.

In 2013 he did the "Raindance Berlin Documentary Foundation Course" (Raindance Film Festival) to expand his abilities as a filmmaker because he started working on two Documentaries for the first time.

From 2013 to 2015 he was Coach and Director for Prison Theater in Women's Prison Berlin - Pankow for the projects "Home" and "Identity".

In Feb. 2021 he took part with 184 other LGBTQIA+ Actors in the Initiative Actout of the famous German SZ-Magazin.

He is a member of the German Film Academy (Deutsche Filmakademie), European Film Academy and the German Screen Actors Guild (BFFS).

Biography for Oliver Broumis at IMDb

== Films ==
- Immer & Ewig a.k.a. Always & Forever (1991)
- Stalingrad
- Hasenjagd a.k.a. The Quality of Mercy (1994)
- Gefährliche Orte – Bombenleger (1996)
- Durchgebraten (1997)
- Die letzte Sekunde (1997)
- Bella Martha a.k.a. Mostly Martha (2000)
- Girl (2001)
- Neon Eyes (2002)
- Sergeant Pepper (2003)
- Die Gelegenheit (2003)
- Zwischen Kopf und Himmel (2004)
- Perle (2004)
- Hochzeitszone (2005)
- Saturn Returns (2009)
- Die Unbedingten (2009)
- Unter dir die Stadt (2009)
- Unter den Händen (2010)
- What Doesn't Kill Us (2018)
- Unspoken (2022)

== TV ==
- Tatort: Lauf eines Todes (1989)
- Die Spinnen (1989)
- Magic (1991), Series, Great Britain
- Großstadtrevier: Bodo (1994)
- Ein tödliches Vergehen (1995)
- Sophie – Schlauer als die Polizei (1996)
- Austernexpress (1996)
- SK-Babies: Alle für einen (1997)
- Balko: Blutige Beute (1997)
- Julia – Kämpfe für deine Träume (1997)
- Ein Fall für zwei: Die letzte Rate a.k.a. A Case for Two (1997)
- Die Unbestechliche (1998)
- Küstenwache: Blinder Passagier (1998)
- SOKO 5113: Auge um Auge (1998)
- Ein Fall für zwei: Blutiges Geld a.k.a. A Case for Two (1998)
- Doppelter Einsatz: Evas Tod (1998)
- Menschenjagd (1998)
- Die Stunde des Löwen (1998)
- Die Schule am See: Der Coup mit der Kuh (1998)
- Die Schule am See: Die Überraschung (1999)
- Schlaf mit meinem Mann (1999)
- Die Kommissarin: Falsche Opfer
- At Your Own Risk: Ladendiebe (2000)
- SOKO 5113: Alleingang (2000)
- All´arrabbiata (2000)
- SK Kölsch: Ruhe in Frieden (2001)
- Tatort: Zahltag (2001)
- Durch Dick und Dünn (2001)
- Wolffs Revier: Heisse Suppe a.k.a. Wolff's Turf (2002)
- Tatort: Große Liebe (2003)
- Donna Leon – Acqua Alta (2003)
- Bernhard Grzimek – Ein Leben für die Tiere (2004)
- Bis in die Spitzen a.k.a. Blow dry (2005–2006)
- Die großen und die kleinen Wünsche – David gegen Goliath (2006)
- SOKO Wismar: Tödliche Hörner (2006)
- Familie Dr. Kleist: Zerreissprobe (2007)
- Tierisch verliebt (2007)
- Immer Wirbel um Marie (2008)
- Krimi.de: Nebenan (2008)
- Frau Böhm sagt Nein (2009)
- Notruf Hafenkante: Die Tangotänzerin (2011)
- Stuttgart Homicide: 4 Männer und ein Baby (2012)
- Binny and the Ghost: Episode 6 & 7 (2014)
- Der Lehrer: Deine DNA, Dein Job (2014)
- Chuzpe – Klops braucht der Mensch! (2015)
- Capelli Code (2017)
- Familie Dr. Kleist: Die Hoffnung stirbt zuletzt (2017)
- Leipzig Homicide: Familienteufel (2018)

== Awards ==
- Immer & Ewig a.k.a. Always & Forever (1991) - Solothurn Film festival, Best Picture
- Stalingrad - Bavarian Film Award, Categories: Producer, Editor and Cinematography Award
- Stalingrad -Jupiter for Best Picture
- Hasenjagd a.k.a. The Quality of Mercy (1995) - Nominee German Film Award
- Hasenjagd a.k.a. The Quality of Mercy (1996) - Award of Jury, San Sebastian Film festival
- Hasenjagd a.k.a. The Quality of Mercy (1997) - Award of Jury, Filmkunstfest MV - Schwerin
- Die letzte Sekunde (1997) - Kodak Eastman Prize, Filmfestival Hof
- Bella Martha a.k.a. Mostly Martha (2002) - Nominee German Film Award
- Bella Martha a.k.a. Mostly Martha (2003) - Nominee Goya, Spain - Best european Picture
- Die Gelegenheit (2004) - Festival D´Angers, Grand Prize of Jury and Award for Beginners, City of Munich
- Sergeant Pepper (2005) - Film festival Toronto, best Picture, Young Peoples Jury and Munich Film festival, White Elephant
- Bernhard Grzimek – Ein Leben für die Tiere (2006) - Eco Film festival, Best Picture
- Frau Böhm sagt Nein (2009) - Audience Award Baden-Baden TV Film festival
- Frau Böhm sagt Nein (2010) - Adolf Grimme Prize
- Die Unbedingten (2009) - Studio Hamburg, Nominee Young Talent Award
- Unter dir die Stadt (2012) - Studio Hamburg, Nominee Young Talent Award
- What Doesn't Kill Us (2018) - Hamburg Film festival, Nominee Producers Award
- What Doesn't Kill Us (2018) - Nominee Art Cinema Award (C.I.C.A.E.)
- Unspoken (2024) - Rating worthy by German Film and Media Rating FBW
- Unspoken (2025) - Best Feature Film at Rome Prisma Film Award
- Unspoken (2025) - Best LGBTQ Film at Director Talents Movie Awards London
- Unspoken (2025) - Best LGBTQ Film at Los Angeles Movie & Music Video Awards

== Theater ==
- Methusalem oder ewige Bürger, Junges Theater Göttingen (1986)
- Karl Valentin, Junges Theater Göttingen (1987)
- Ich bin nicht Rappaport, Kammerspiele Düsseldorf (1989)
- The Wizard of Oz, Theater Bremen (1989)
- Nachtvorstellung, Opera Stabile / Staatsoper Hamburg (1989-1990)
- Coriolanus, Theater Basel (1991)
- Das Erwachen, Theater Heidelberg (1992)
- Kuprianov and Natase, Festival Junge Hunde im Mai, Hamburg
- Faust, Schiller Theater Berlin (1993)
- The Basis of Make-Up, Volksbühne Berlin and Forum Expanded, Intern. Film Festival Berlin - Berlinale (2006–2008)
