= Tatjana Turanskyj =

German director, film producer, screenwriter, and actor (1966–2021)

Tatjana Turanskyj (Hanover, 27 July 1966 - 18 September 2021)) was a German film director, producer, screenwriter and performer with feminist views.

== Films ==
- 2001: Hangover (with Hangover Ltd.), 72 min.
- 2003: Petra (with Hangover Ltd.), 70 min.
- 2004: Wedding (together with Wiebke Berndt), 5 min.
- 2005: Remake (with Hangover Ltd.), 20 min.
- 2006: Sehnsucht nach Schüssen, 60 min.
- 2007: Korleput (with Hangover Ltd.), 72 min., with Bastian Trost and Christine Groß
- 2008: I’m a Dancer, 6 min.
- 2010: Eine flexible Frau, 97 min., part 1 of a trilogy, with Mira Partecke, Laura Tonke, Bastian Trost
- 2014: Top Girl oder La déformation professionnelle, 94 min., with Julia Hummer, Susanne Bredehöft, Jojo Pohl, Nina Kronjäger, RP Kahl
- 2015: Orientierungslosigkeit ist kein Verbrechen, directed together with Marita Neher, 76 min., with Nina Kronjäger, Anna Schmidt, Kathrin Krottenthaler
