= Martin Heisenberg =

German neuroscientist

- Born: 7 August 1940 (age 86); Munich, Germany
- Education: University of Tübingen
- Known for: Neurogenetics of Drosophila
- Spouse(s): Apollonia, Countess of Eulenburg
- Children: Four sons, including Benjamin Heisenberg
- Father: Werner Heisenberg
- Relatives: Jochen Heisenberg (brother)
- Scientific career
- Fields: Neurobiology; Genetics
- Workplaces: Max Planck Institute for Biological Cybernetics; University of Utah; University of Würzburg; Rudolf Virchow Center
- Doctoral advisor: Max Delbrück

Martin Heisenberg (born 7 August 1940) is a German neurobiologist and geneticist. Before his retirement in 2008, he held the professorial chair for genetics and neurobiology at the Bio Centre of the University of Würzburg. Since then, he continues his research with a senior professorship at the Rudolf Virchow Center of the University of Würzburg. Heisenberg studied chemistry and molecular biology in Munich, Tübingen and Pasadena. In 1975 he became Professor of genetics and neurobiology at the University of Würzburg. Heisenberg's work has focused on the neurogenetics of Drosophila (the fruit fly), with the aim of investigating the genetic foundations of the Drosophila brain by studying the effect of genetic mutations on brain function. In addition, Heisenberg contributed a number of essays on the topics of science in society, perception, as well as the question of the freedom of the will. He was elected as a member of the Leopoldina in 1989.

Martin Heisenberg is a son of the physicist Werner Heisenberg, who is known for the creation of quantum mechanics and discovering the uncertainty principle. He is married to Apollonia, Countess of Eulenburg. They have four sons, including film director Benjamin Heisenberg. His grandson, Michael Heisenberg, son of Emanuel Heisenberg, is a psychologist based in Perth, Western Australia. He is the brother of physicist Jochen Heisenberg.

== Distinctions ==
- 1986/87 Cornelius Wiersma Visiting Professor, California Institute of Technology, Pasadena, USA
- 1989 German National Academy Leopoldina
- 1998 Academia Europaea
- 1999 Academy of Sciences Göttingen
- 2001 Berlin-Brandenburg Academy of Science
- 2006 Karl Ritter von Frisch Medal of the Deutsche Zoologische Gesellschaft (DZG)
- 2007–2010 President International Society of Neuroethology
- 2009 Doctor honoris causa Université Paul Sabatier, Toulouse

== Publications (selection) ==
=== English original research publications (selection) ===
- M. Heisenberg, A. Borst, S. Wagner, D. Byers: Drosophila mushroom body mutants are deficient in olfactory learning. J. Neurogenetics. 2, 1-30 (1985)
- J.S. deBelle and M. Heisenberg: Associative odor learning in Drosophila abolished by chemical ablation of Mushroom Bodies. Science 263, 692-695 (1994)
- L. Liu, R. Wolf, R. Ernst, and M. Heisenberg: Context generalization in Drosophila visual learning requires the mushroom bodies. Nature 400, 753-756 (1999)
- T. Zars, M. Fischer, R. Schulz and M. Heisenberg: Localization of a short-term memory in Drosophila. Science 288, 672-675 (2000)
- M. Schwaerzel, M. Monasterioti, H. Scholz, F. Friggi-Grelin, S. Birman, and M. Heisenberg: Dopamine and octopamine differentiate between aversive and appetitive olfactory memories in Drosophila. J Neurosci 23, 10495-10502 (2003)
- S. Tang, R. Wolf, S. Xu and M. Heisenberg: Visual pattern recognition in Drosophila is invariant for retinal position. Science 305, 1020–1022 (2004)
- G. Liu, H. Seiler, A. Wen, T. Zars, K. Ito, R. Wolf, M. Heisenberg and L. Liu: Distinct memory traces for two visual features in the Drosophila brain. Nature 439, 551-556 (2006)
- J. Rister, D. Pauls, B. Schnell, C.Y. Ting, C.H. Lee, I. Sinakevitch, J. Morante, N.J. Strausfeld, K. Ito and M. Heisenberg: Dissection of the peripheral motion channel in the visual system of Drosophila melanogaster. Neuron 56, 155-170 (2007)
- P. Sareen, R. Wolf and M. Heisenberg: Attracting the attention of a fly. Proc Natl Acad Sci USA 108, 7230-7235 (2011)
- Z. Yang, F. Bertolucci, R. Wolf, M. Heisenberg: Flies cope with uncontrollable stress by learned helplessness. Curr Biol 23, 799-803 (2013)
- N.S. Chouhan, R. Wolf, C. Helfrich-Förster, M. Heisenberg: Flies remember the time of day. Curr Biol 25, 1619–1624 (2015)

=== Books published, Editorship ===
- M. Heisenberg, R. Wolf: Vision in Drosophila. Vol. XII, of: Studies of Brain Function, V. Braitenberg, Ed., Springer-Verlag Berlin, Heidelberg, New York (1984)
- M. Heisenberg (Ed.). Special issue Mushroom body. Learning & Memory 5, (1998)

=== English reviews and essays (selection) ===
- M. Heisenberg: Voluntariness (Willkürfähigkeit) and the general organization of behavior. In: Flexibility and Constraints in Behavioral Systems, R.J. Greenspan and C.P. Kyriacou, eds.; pp147–156, John Wiley & Sons Ltd. (1994)
- M. Heisenberg: Mushroom body memoir: From maps to models. Nature Rev Neurosci 4, 266-275 (2003)
- M. Heisenberg: Is free will an illusion? Nature 459, 1052-1053 (2009)
- B. Gerber, H. Tanimoto, and M. Heisenberg: An engram found? Evaluating the evidence from fruit flies. Curr Op Neurobiol 14, 737-744 (2004)
- M. Heisenberg: Erich Buchner. J Neurogenet 24,:93-94 (2010)
- M. Heisenberg: The beauty of the network in the brain and the origin of the mind in the control of behavior. J Neurogenet 28, 389-99 (2014)

=== German reviews and essays (selection) ===
- M. Heisenberg: Initiale Aktivität und Willkürverhalten bei Tieren. Naturwissenschaften 70, 70-78 (1983)
- M. Heisenberg: Freiheit aus der Sicht der Verhaltensforschung In: Ordnung und Unordnung. G. Becker, H. Becker, L. Huber, Eds.; pp. 74–82, Beltz Verlag (1985)
- M. Heisenberg: Über Universalien der Wahrnehmung und ihre genetischen Grundlagen. In: Mannheimer Forum 89/90 H.v.Ditfurth, E.P. Fischer, Eds.; Bd. 1104, pp. 11–69. Piper München, Zürich
- M. Heisenberg: Freiheit als Eigenschaft des Verhaltens. Nova Acta Leopoldina NF 86, 79-95 (2002)
- M. Heisenberg: Die Pilzkörper der Insekten – Trojanisches Pferd der funktionellen Hirnforschung? Neuroforum 2, 179-186 (2002)

=== Academic theses ===
- M. Heisenberg: Eine neue Genfunktion des Bakteriophagen fr. Dissertation, Eberhard-Karls-Universität Tübingen (1966)

=== About Martin Heisenberg ===
- Drosophila Neurogenetics: The Heisenberg impact. E. Buchner and C.F. Wu, Eds.; J. Neurogenetics 23, 1-2, (2009)
