= Jochen Heisenberg =

German physicist

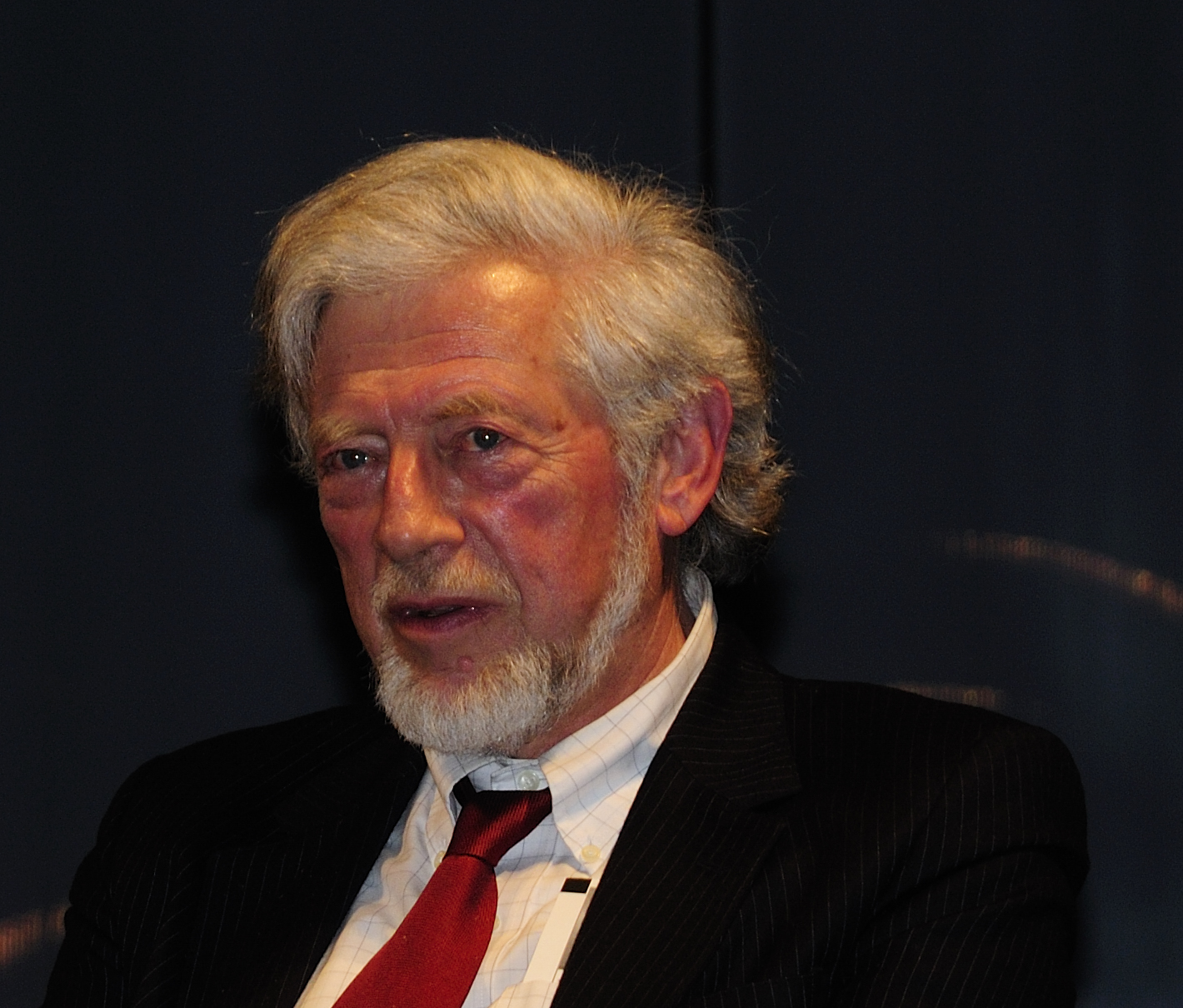
- Born: 16 May 1939 (age 87)
- Education: LMU Munich; University of Hamburg
- Father: Werner Heisenberg
- Scientific career
- Fields: Nuclear physics
- Workplaces: Massachusetts Institute of Technology; University of New Hampshire
- Doctoral advisor: Willibald Jentschke

Jochen Heisenberg (born 16 May 1939) is a German physicist specializing in nuclear physics, and Professor Emeritus of Physics at the University of New Hampshire. He is the son of Nobel Prize-winning physicist Werner Heisenberg, who was a co-founder of quantum mechanics, and who, in particular, introduced the uncertainty principle. He is the brother of German neurobiologist and geneticist Martin Heisenberg and the uncle of film director Benjamin Heisenberg.

== Professional career ==
Heisenberg studied physics first at LMU Munich, and then finished his Diplom at the University of Hamburg, where he continued his studies with Willibald Jentschke and received his PhD in 1968. He then spent a two-year postdoctoral fellowship at Stanford University. From 1970 to 1978, he was a member of the faculty at the Massachusetts Institute of Technology.

During his early career at Stanford and MIT, Heisenberg participated in numerous experimental studies of nuclear reactions. Using the Bates Linear Accelerator, he published numerous papers on electroexcitations. After his move to the University of New Hampshire (UNH), he began to study methods for theoretical prediction of such reactions. During the past ten years, he has been active in the development of computational models of large nuclei and has published several papers on these topics.

== Historical perspectives ==
Heisenberg has spoken several times to provide a historical perspective on the activities of his father during and after World War II. He has been invited to comment on Michael Frayn's well-known play Copenhagen and has published his perspectives on his father's activities. He maintained an informational website containing biographical information and reference material on Werner Heisenberg.
