= Ehre =

Ehre is a surname. Notable people with the surname include:

- Ida Ehre (1900–1989), Austrian-German actress
- Thea Ehre (born 1999), Austrian actress
