= Bastian Trost =

German actor

- Born: 29 March 1974 (age 52); Düsseldorf, West Germany
- Occupation: Actor
- Years active: 1994–present

Bastian Trost (born 29 March 1974) is a German actor. He has appeared in 30 films and television shows since 1994. He starred in the film Sleeper, which was screened in the Un Certain Regard section at the 2005 Cannes Film Festival.

== Selected filmography ==
- After the Truth (1999)
- Sleeper (2005)
- The Lives of Others (2006)
- Close to You (2009)
- Eine flexible Frau (2010)
- The Invention of Love (2013)
