= The City Below =

2010 film

- Directed by: Christoph Hochhäusler
- Written by: Christoph Hochhäusler; Ulrich Peltzer
- Produced by: Sascha Verhey
- Starring: Robert Hunger-Bühler
- Cinematography: Bernhard Keller
- Production companies: WDR; Arte
- Distributed by: Piffl Medien
- Release dates: 15 May 2010 (Cannes); 31 March 2011 (Germany)
- Country: Germany
- Language: German

The City Below (German: Unter dir die Stadt) is a 2010 German film directed by Christoph Hochhäusler. It was screened in the Un Certain Regard section at the 2010 Cannes Film Festival.

== Cast ==
- Robert Hunger-Bühler as Roland Cordes
- Nicolette Krebitz as Svenja Steve
- Mark Waschke as Oliver Steve
- Wolfgang Böck as Werner Löbau
- Corinna Kirchhoff as Claudia Cordes
- Michael Abendroth as Hartmut John
- Angelika Bartsch as Annika Lebert
- André Dietz as Mario Scharf
- Oliver Broumis as Maas
- Paul Faßnacht as Hermann Josef Esch
- Alexandra Finder as Britta Lau
- Piet Fuchs as Jens Janssen
- Stefan Gebelhoff as Headhunter
- Johannes Kiebranz as Gordon Parker
- Antje Lewald as Ulrke Krantz
- Viola Pobitschka as Constanze Lehmann
