= The Quality of Mercy (film) =

- Directed by: Andreas Gruber
- Written by: Andreas Gruber
- Produced by: Andreas Gruber, Provinz Film
- Starring: Oliver Broumis; Merab Ninidze
- Cinematography: Hermann Dunzendorfer
- Music by: Peter Androsch
- Release date: 1994
- Running time: 106 minutes
- Country: Austria
- Language: German

The Quality of Mercy (original title: Hasenjagd – Vor lauter Feigheit gibt es kein Erbarmen) is a dramatization of the events surrounding the Mühlviertler Hasenjagd, a Nazi war crime that took place near Linz, in the Mühlviertel region of Upper Austria, just before the end of the Second World War. The film's original title translates as "Rabbit chase – for sheer cowardice, there is no mercy", a reference to the name given by the SS to the manhunt for the hundreds of prisoners who managed to escape from Mauthausen-Gusen concentration camp. Nearly 500 tried to escape, over 300 made it to the nearby woods, and of those, just 11 managed to survive the three months until the war ended. Most were shot on the spot or beaten to death when they were found, 57 were returned to the camp. The film attracted 123,000 spectators in Austria, making it the most successful film of 1995.

== Plot ==
The film starts in January 1945. The audience is advised of the real events on which the film is based. The first images are of the Mauthausen-Gusen concentration camp, and afterwards the inside of the death block of barrack 20 is shown. 500 Russian soldiers, who have refused to fight for Germany after being arrested, are asleep on the floor when the wake-up-call rings. Having been put on a harsh diet, many get up only laboriously, while some are completely unable to do so at all.

Among the prisoners of war are Russian officers Michail and Nikolai, whose destiny serves as the central thread in the film. A stone falls down the wall with a message wrapped around it: Block 20 shall be cleared in a month!

=== The breakout ===
A planned breakout is carried out in the following days. The prisoners overpower the Kapos, construct shoes and weapons out of blankets and other items and say goodbye to those who are too weak for the escape. While the tower guards are distracted with fire extinguishers and missiles, tables and chairs are piled up in front of the walls. Only 150 of the 500 manage to escape into the night, among them are Michail and Nikolai. The majority, however, die in the confines of the camp.

The sirens sounding from the camp wake up the neighbourhood at half past three in the morning, among them is the Karner family. The people stream out of their houses, informed by the SS that 500 “felons” have escaped from the camp and have fled North. All available men from Volkssturm, Wehrmacht on holidays, gendarmerie and Hitler Youth participate in the chase, "felons" are not to be arrested, but killed on the spot.

In the next few minutes, the attitude of many becomes clear. Fredl Karner, looks the other way when he sees three of the fleeing Russians on the very spot where the SS leader has just delivered his speech. Gendarme Binder also disapproves of the chase, as the felons would not do him any harm. The instructions to his group are unmistakable: “None of us will see or hear them, much less arrest them.” Thus, he is in direct opposition to everyone who is eagerly taking part in the chase.

=== The manhunt ===
At dawn, the chase starts. As Mrs Karner makes her way to church, a couple of refugees run out of the forest, the chasers close on their heels. Her son, Fredl, is also part of the group which kills the refugees in full view of Mrs. Karner and her little daughter.

Eventually, Fredl's group also catches one of the prisoners alive. Nobody can bear the thought of shooting him, so they decide that Fredl and another man will take him to the SS. Hours later, they are still wandering around with him, not knowing what to do. Finally they decide to let him go, when the SS appears and shoots the Russian.

Michail and Nikolai have meanwhile hidden in the church steeple with their friend Andrej, where they watch prisoners being rounded up. While searching for food, they are seen by the grocer Lehmberger, who shoots at them. Another passerby simply ignores them. On the run, they are separated from Andrej, who is shot.

Eventually they come to the farm of the Karner family. Despite the objections of her husband and worries expressed by Fredl, Mrs. Karner welcomes him and gives him a hot meal. Mitzi, the daughter of the house, brings clothes and shoes, whereupon Michail burns his workwear. Afterwards they bring clothes and food to Nikolai, who is hiding in the hayloft.

In order to protect his family, Fredl continues to participate in the chase, which has been named the “bunny hunt”. In the meantime, Gendarme Birker has accommodated some of the refugees in the local jail. Lehmberger, however, discovers them and propels them onto the courtyard, where he shoots them in front of the helpless gendarme.

Mrs. Karner attends church as usual with her youngest daughter Nanni, the two come across some Nazi soldiers who are walking in the direction of their farm. She sends her daughter back to warn Mitzi to hide the Russians in a better place, the search is unsuccessful. In the countryside, Fredl and Berghammer are on the chase. When Berghammer wanders off for a few minutes, Fredl sees a refugee hiding under a footbridge. However, Berghammer discovers him and insists that they take him prisoner. Despite Fredl's protests, he cannot be softened. They deliver the prisoner to the SS. When Fredl is told by the SS leader to shoot him, he refuses. Berghammer takes care of it instead. Gendarme Birker must then arrest Fredl and take him to the Gestapo in Linz; however, he is eventually released. Afterwards, Fredl hides with Michail and Nikolai in the attic on the farm.

=== The aftermath ===
One after another, the fugitives are found. Most are shot, but many of the prisoners freeze or starve to death in the harsh winter.

With Spring coming, and the hasenjagd nearly forgotten, Michail and Nikolai now work at the Karner's farm and when the war ends, nobody cares that Berghammer has discovered the two Russians. They are much more concerned about destroying incriminating files and uniforms. Lehmberger is found hanging in his store.

It is explained in the closing credits that just nine of the 500 Russian soldiers are known to have survived, from a total of 11 escapees who survived the chase without capture. Michail and Nikolai return home and today, they live in the former Soviet Union.

After the credits, a final scene shows a courtroom. The judge renders judgment upon the mayor of the village in which the Hasenjagd has taken place. He has been indicted for inciting the villagers to hunt the prisoners down. Due to many conflicting testimonies, the mayor is acquitted, though the court remains unconvinced of his innocence.

== Cast ==
- Oliver Broumis - Michail
- Merab Ninidze - Nikolai
- Volkmar Kleinert - Herr Kamer
- Elfriede Irrall - Frau Karner
- Rainer Egger - Fredl Karner
- Kirsten Nehberg - Mitzi Karner
- Rüdiger Vogler - Gendarm Birker
- Franz Froschauer - Viktor
- Christoph Künzler - SS-Offizier Strasser
- Thierry Van Werveke - Berghammer

== Awards ==
- Special jury prize, San Sebastián International Film Festival
- Audience award, Diagonale, 1994
- Upper Austria culture award for film art, 1994
- Austrian ticket 1995

== Documentation ==
In autumn 2006, Hasenjagd was released on DVD. Apart from the film, there is a chronological table and a 60-minute behind-the-scenes documentary about the film Aktion K by Bernhard Bamberger which compares the movie with the actual events. The latter juxtaposes interviews with local residents about the film and the actual history with archival footage and the eyewitness testimony of Mikhail Ribchinsky, a survivor of the Mühlviertler Hasenjagd.
