= Thea Ehre =

Austrian performer (born 1999)

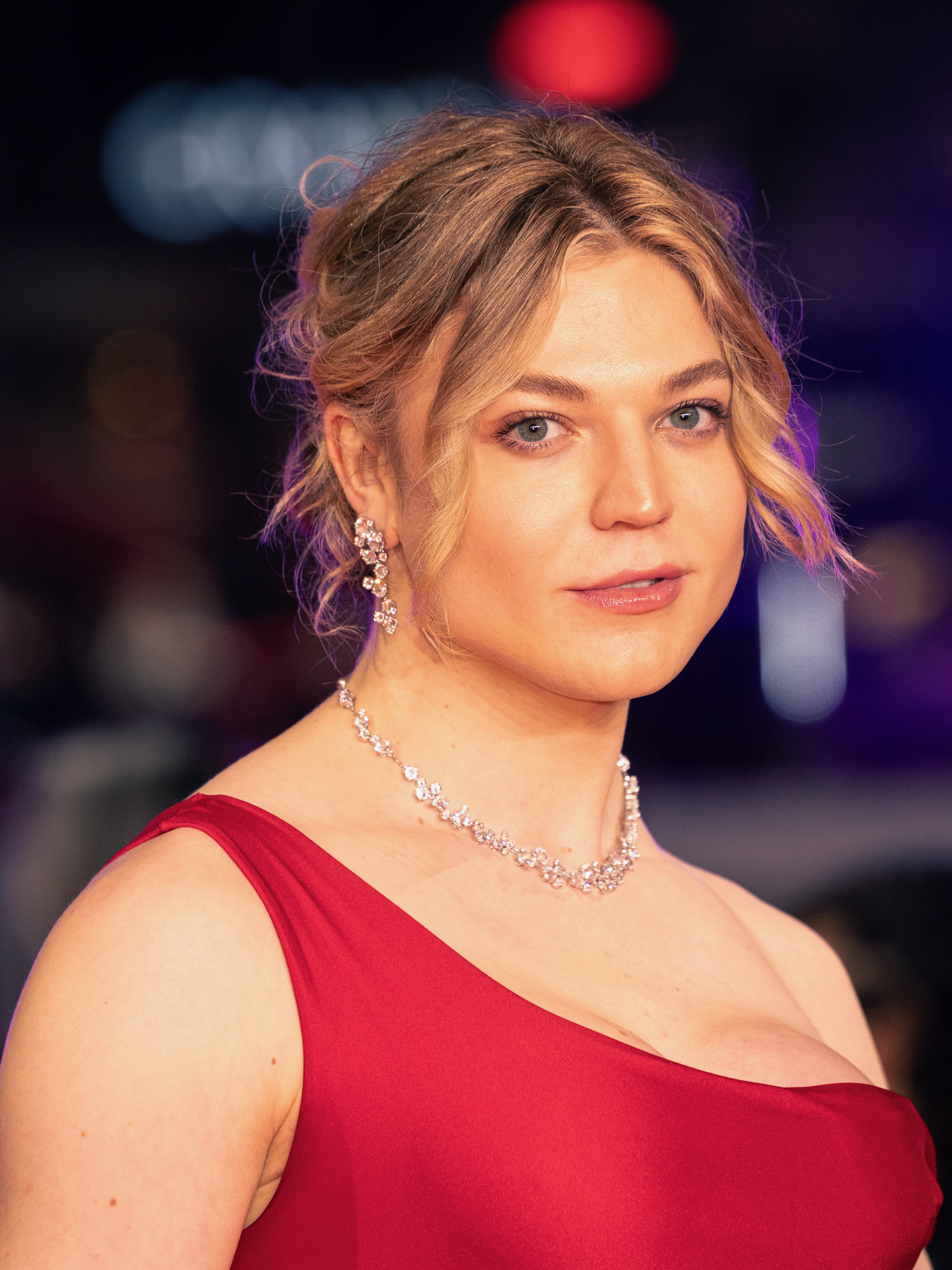
- Thea Ehre at the 2026 BIFF
- Born: 1999 (age 26–27); Wels, Upper Austria, Austria
- Citizenship: Austria
- Occupation: Actor

Thea Ehre (born 1999) is an Austrian actress, performer and human rights activist. She was awarded a Silver Bear for Best Supporting Actress at the Berlin International Film Festival for her role in Christoph Hochhäusler's thriller Till the End of the Night.

== Biography ==
Ehre was born in Wels in Upper Austria in 1999. She studied at the Music and Arts University of the City of Vienna and the Vienna Film Academy. In 2019, Ehre appeared in two episodes of the television series Vorstadtweiber. Since 2020, she has primarily worked as an actress and has appeared in films and series in her native Austria and in Germany.

In 2021, she collaborated with Luca Bonamore, Nick Romeo Reimann and Olivia Scheucher on performance Fugue Four: Response, which premiered at the Porn Film Festival Vienna; an extended version was performed at the Volkstheater, Vienna. The work explored the influence of mainstream pornographic images on personal sexuality. Although actors were naked, no sex acts were performed.

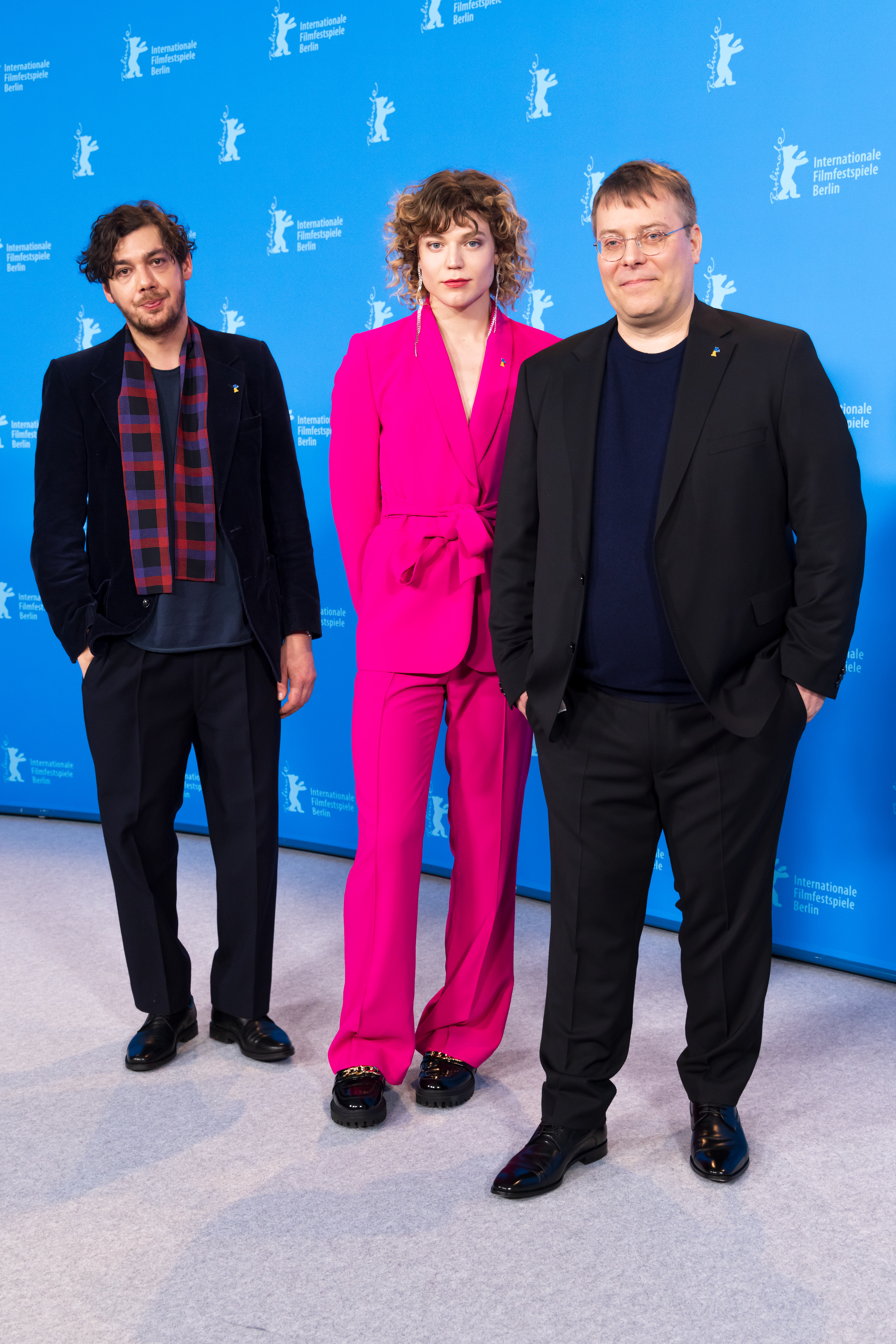
Timocin Ziegler, Thea Ehre and Christoph Hochhäusler presenting the movie Till the End of the Night at the Berlinale 2023

Ehre's film debut came with a role in Christoph Hochhäusler's thriller Till the End of the Night (2023), which was invited to the competition at the Berlin International Film Festival. Alongside Timocin Ziegler, she portrayed the transgender criminal Leni. For her performance, she was awarded a Silver Bear for Best Supporting Actress. She dedicated the award to her parents.

In March 2023, Ehre played the role of Babette in the Amazon Prime crime series Luden – Könige der Reeperbahn. The series was set in the St. Pauli district of Hamburg in the 1980s. The same year, together with Artemis Vakianis, managing director of the Vienna Festival, and the musician LYLIT, she formed the jury for the 2023 Vienna Film Prize at the Viennale.

In 2025, she was selected as one of seven people to represent German film industry in the campaign Face to Face with German Films. The same year Ehre also served on the jury of the Santiago International Film Festival in Chile in the "Competencia cortometraje talento nacional" section, alongside film festival director Maud Amson and Chilean actor Clemente Rodriguez.

== Personal life ==
In February 2021, Ehre came out as part of the #actout initiative in the SZ-Magazin, alongside 184 other lesbian, gay, bisexual, queer, non-binary and trans actors; at that time she used the name Thea David Ehrensperger. She is an advocate for LGBTQ+ people in the film and television industries, and is a human rights activist. Ehre is transgender.

== Theatre ==
- 2021: Fugue Four: Response (Performance, Volkstheater, Vienna)
- 2023: Fugue Four: Response (Performance, in a revised version at the Impulstanzfestival)
- 2025: RETROTOPIA (Kosmos Theater Wien)

== Filmography ==
- 2019: Vorstadtweiber (TV series, 2 episodes)
- 2022: Gegenlicht (Short film)
- 2023: Till the End of the Night
- 2023: Luden – Könige der Reeperbahn (Amazon Prime series)
- 2023: Visiting Johanna (Short film)
- 2024: Sløborn (TV series)
- 2024: Die Fälle der Gerti B. (TV series)
- 2024: Tatort
  - Episode Borowski und das ewige Meer
  - Episode Borowski und das Haupt der Medusa
- 2025: Ohne jede Spur – Der Fall der Nathalie B. (TV film)
- 2025: Oben ohne

== Awards ==
- 2023: Silver Bear at the Berlin International Film Festival for Best Supporting Actress in the film Till the End of the Night
- 2023: Nomination for the German Acting Award in the category Actor/Actress in a Dramatic Leading Role in the film Until the End of the Night
- 2023: Won Best Actress at the Buenos Aires International Film Festival in Argentina
- 2023: Best Acting at the Linz International Short Film Festival for Visit by Martin Weiss
- 2025: BBC Audio Drama Awards Shortlist "You Didn't Bargain with Dolores" in the Best European Drama category
