= Roeland Wiesnekker =

Roeland Wiesnekker (pron. 'Roo-Land') (b. 25 November 1967 near Zürich) is a Dutch / Swiss actor in movies and theater plays.

== Life ==
Wiesnekker grew up in a music-loving family and tried out various instruments. Despite that, he wanted to become an actor, because he adored Charlie Chaplin. At the age of 15 Wiesnekker started a cook apprenticeship, but did not agree with the “hierarchic structures”. At the age of 16 he planned to become a sports teacher, but soon took up work in a hospital instead. As the job as a male nurse did not satisfy him either, he began working in a Gassenküche (“street-kitchen” - a soup kitchen for the homeless and drug-addicted), a job that moulded his character. Later he decided to become an actor.

From 1986 to 1989, he frequented the Schauspielakademie (a drama school) in Zürich. Even before he received the diploma, he was engaged by the theatre Schauspielhaus Bochum, Germany. In 1990 he was nominated for the award Deutscher Nachwuchsschauspieler des Jahres (German talented young actor of the year). Wiesnekker went back to Zürich – despite offers of possible roles abroad. In Zürich he participated in very different productions e.g. in Der Menschenfeind at the Schauspielhaus Zürich.

He was already familiar with film acting in 1989, having played a part in short film Karl and afterwards e.g. in the Eurocops series (1991) with Barbara Rudnik (Director: Markus Imboden). Since the summer of 2003 he joined the cast of Swiss sitcom Lüthi und Blanc. In 2005 Wisenekker was awarded the Schweizer Filmpreis als Bester Hauptdarsteller (Swiss film award for the best main role) for his role of drug addict policeman Herbert Strähl in Strähl. Ever since then Wiesnekker was able to select his roles himself, even abroad (He speaks German, Swiss German, Dutch, English and French). He likes to learn his lines in crowded pubs. He chooses his roles intuitively, not necessarily big ones. The characters should be complex, the script interesting and the director gifted.

== Cinema films (selection) ==
- Kafka's The Burrow (Director: Jochen Alexander Freydank), 2014
- Kill Me (Director: Emily Atef), 2012
- The Silence (Director: Baran bo Odar), 2010
- The Welfare Worker (Director: Lutz Konermann), 2009
- Marmorera (Director: Markus Fischer), 2007
- Messy Christmas (Director: Vanessa Jopp), 2007
- Breakout (Director: Mike Eschmann), 2006
- Strähl (Director: Manuel Flurin Hendry), 2004
- Eden (Director: Michael Hofmann), 2004
- Bad News (short film) (Director: Christian Roesch), 2004
- 666 - Trau keinem mit dem Du schläfst (Director: Rainer Matsutani), 2002
- Stille Liebe (Director: Christoph Schaub), 2001
- Komiker (Director: Markus Imboden), 2000
- Katzendiebe (Director: Markus Imboden), 1996
- Der Nebelläufer (Director: Jörg Helbling), 1995
- Always & Forever (1991)

== TV films (selection) ==
- The Ingredients of Love (Director: Gregor Schnitzler), 2014
- Murder on Amrum (Director: Markus Imboden), 2009
- Day of Disaster (Director: Peter Keglevic), 2006
- Nebenwirkungen (Director: Manuel Siebenmann), 2006
- Dr. Psycho – Die Bösen, die Bullen, meine Frau und ich (Director: Ralf Huettner), 2006
- Der falsche Tod (Director: Martin Eigler), 2006
- Blackout – Die Erinnerung ist tödlich (Director: Peter Keglevic, Hans Günter Bücking), 2005
- Tatort – Schneetreiben (Director: Tobias Ineichen), 2005
- Swabian Children (Director: Jo Baier), 2003
- Königskinder (Director: Isabel Kleefeld), 2002
- Füür oder Flamme (Director: Markus Fischer), 2002
- Dilemma (Director: Tobias Ineichen), 2002
- Hat er Arbeit? (Director: Kai Wessel), 2000
- Wolfsheim (Director: Nicole Weegmann), 2000
- Erhöhte Waldbrandgefahr (Director: Matthias Zschokke), 1996

== Theater play (selection) ==
- Clockwork Orange (Director: Michel Schröder), Fabriktheater Zürich, 2004
- Nur noch heute (Director: Barbara David Brüesch), Theater Gessnerallee Zürich and Sophiensäle Berlin, 2004
- Heinrich IV (Director: Stefan Pucher), Schauspielhaus Zürich, 2002
