= I Am Guilty =

2005 film

- Film poster
- Directed by: Christoph Hochhäusler
- Written by: Christoph Hochhäusler
- Produced by: Bettina Brokemper
- Starring: Constantin von Jascheroff
- Cinematography: Bernhard Keller
- Edited by: Stefan Stabenow
- Release date: 15 May 2005
- Running time: 90 minutes
- Country: Germany
- Language: German

I Am Guilty (German: Falscher Bekenner) is a 2005 German drama film directed by Christoph Hochhäusler. It was screened in the Un Certain Regard section at the 2005 Cannes Film Festival.

== Cast ==
- Constantin von Jascheroff as Armin Steeb
- Manfred Zapatka as Martin Steeb
- Victoria Trauttmansdorff as Marianne Steeb
- Nora von Waldstätten as Katja Fichtner
- Devid Striesow as Martin Steeb jr.
- Florian Panzner as Stefan Steeb
- Thomas Dannemann as Herr Kleine
- Laura Tonke as Christiane Steeb
- Dennis Prinz as Ulrich Wendt
- Martin Kiefer as Richard Gassner
- Walter Gontermann as Herr Hülsmann
- Jörg Pose as Herr Esken
- Thomas Meinhardt as Ernst Matuschek
- Wieslawa Wesolowska as Josy Matuscheck
- Max Limper as Lederboy
