= Martin J. Lohse =

German physician and pharmacologist

Martin J. Lohse (born 26 August 1956) is a German physician and pharmacologist.

== Career ==
Lohse performs ongoing research on G protein-coupled receptors. Since 1993, he is a Professor of Pharmacology at the University of Würzburg, Germany, retired in 2022, and he was the Founding Chairman of the Rudolf Virchow Center (2001–2016). From 2016 to 2019, he was Chairman of the Board and Scientific Director of the Max Delbrück Center in Berlin, a national research center of the Helmholtz Association for molecular medicine. In 2017, he also became Speaker of the Board of the Berlin Institute of Health, a joint research center of the Max Delbrück Center and the Charité. Since 2020 he is chairman and managing director of ISAR Bioscience Institute, a translational research institute in Planegg/Munich.

Lohse received his exam in medicine as well as his M.D. from the University of Göttingen, and did research in pharmacology at the University of Heidelberg, Duke University and the GeneCenter in Munich. His research focusses on the role of receptors in heart failure and on the mechanisms of their activation and inactivation.

While working with Robert Lefkowitz at Duke University he discovered beta-arrestins, proteins that regulate the function of certain cell surface receptors. He discovered that beta-1 adrenergic receptors and their regulatory G protein-coupled receptor kinases are dysregulated in heart failure. The observation that increased β1-adrenergic receptor levels and signaling cause long-term cardiac damage contributed to the use of beta-blockers in heart failure patients. Further studies by his lab showed that heart failure is accompanied by a specific type of activation of so-called ERK protein kinases (Extracellular signal-regulated kinases). Another regulatory protein, Raf kinase inhibitor protein (RKIP), was shown to exert beneficial effects on cardiac structure and function. Lohse pioneered the use of optical techniques to determine, where and how fast receptors become activated by hormones and neurotransmitters. These studies led to the concept of nanometer-sized independent domains where signaling by individual receptors occurs.

== Awards ==
He was awarded the Leibniz Award in 1999, the Ernst Jung Award for Medicine in 2000, and the Research Achievement Award of the International Society of Heart Research in 2007. From 2003 until 2008 he was a member of the German National Ethics Council. From 2009 to 2015 he was Vice President for Research of the University of Würzburg. From 2009 to 2019, he was Vice President of the German Academy of Sciences Leopoldina. From 2019 to 2022 he served as President of the Society of German Natural Scientists and Physicians and organized its 200-year anniversary meeting in Leipzig in 2022.
