= Alexandra Finder =

German actress (born 1977)

- Born: 12 July 1977 (age 48); East Berlin, East Germany
- Occupation: Actress
- Years active: 1998-present

Alexandra Finder (born 12 July 1977) is a German actress. She appeared in more than thirty films since 1998.

== Selected filmography ==
Year	Title	Role	Notes
2010	The City Below		
2013	The Police Officer's Wife	Christine Perkinger	
