= Always & Forever (film) =

1991 film

- Directed by: Samir
- Written by: Samir
- Starring: Roeland Wiesnekker
- Cinematography: Samir
- Release date: July 1991
- Running time: 85 minutes
- Country: Switzerland
- Language: German

Always & Forever (German: Immer & ewig) is a 1991 Swiss drama film directed by Samir. It was entered into the 17th Moscow International Film Festival.

== Cast ==
- Roeland Wiesnekker as Alex
- Werner Gerber as Assistant
- Yves Raeber as Zivilfahnder
- Oliver Broumis as Claude
- Stefan Stutzer as Dani
- Heidi Züger as Babs
- Nicole Ansari-Cox as Dodo (as Nicole Ansari)
- Christoph Künzler as Kommissar Weber
