= Till the End of the Night =

2023 German thriller film

- Promotional poster
- Directed by: Christoph Hochhäusler
- Written by: Christoph Hochhäusler; Florian Plumeyer
- Produced by: Bettina Broker
- Starring: Timocin Ziegler; Thea Ehre; Michael Sideris
- Cinematography: Reinhold Vorschneider
- Edited by: Stephen Stabenow
- Production company: Heimatfilm GmbH + Co KG (Cologne)
- Distributed by: Grandfilm GmbH [en]
- Release dates: 24 February 2023 (Berlinale); 6 July 2023 (Theatres)
- Running time: 120 minutes
- Country: Germany
- Language: German

Till the End of the Night (German: Bis ans Ende der Nacht) is a 2023 German thriller film directed and co-written by Christoph Hochhäusler. Starring Timocin Ziegler, Thea Ehre and Michael Sideris, the film is about an undercover agent who is supposed to gain the trust of a criminal through a fictitious relationship with a contact person. It is selected to compete for the Golden Bear at the 73rd Berlin International Film Festival, where it had its world premiere on 24 February 2023. The film is also nominated for Best Feature Film Teddy Award.

It was released in Germany on 6 July 2023.

== Synopsis ==
Undercover agent Robert is given the task to infiltrate the drug organization as the partner of the trans woman Leni, with the aim of gaining the trust of a big dealer. For Robert, who is gay, the love story becomes an unpleasant task as he is equally attracted to and repelled by Leni. The success of the mission will determine whether she must resume the prison sentence or not. It is, of all people, the dealer they are spying on who makes Robert confront his conflicting feelings.

== Cast ==
- Timocin Ziegler as Robert Demant
- Thea Ehre as Leni Malinowski
- Michael Sideris as Victor Arth
- Ioana Teodora Iacob as Nicole
- Aérea Negrot as Dana
- Daniel Drewes as Mondrogai
- Andreas Grusinski as Ben Metz
- Jonny Hoff as Timo
- Gabriele Giersiepen as landlady
- Martin Horn as Head of Department
- Andreas Grusinski as Ben Metz
- Johnny Hoff as Timo
- Pink Enskat as Monika Sterz
- Sahin Eryilmaz as Armin Strauss
- Anne Schwarz as Nadja Saric
- Rolf Heutmann as Superior Presidency
- Noah Forouzan as passerby

== Production ==
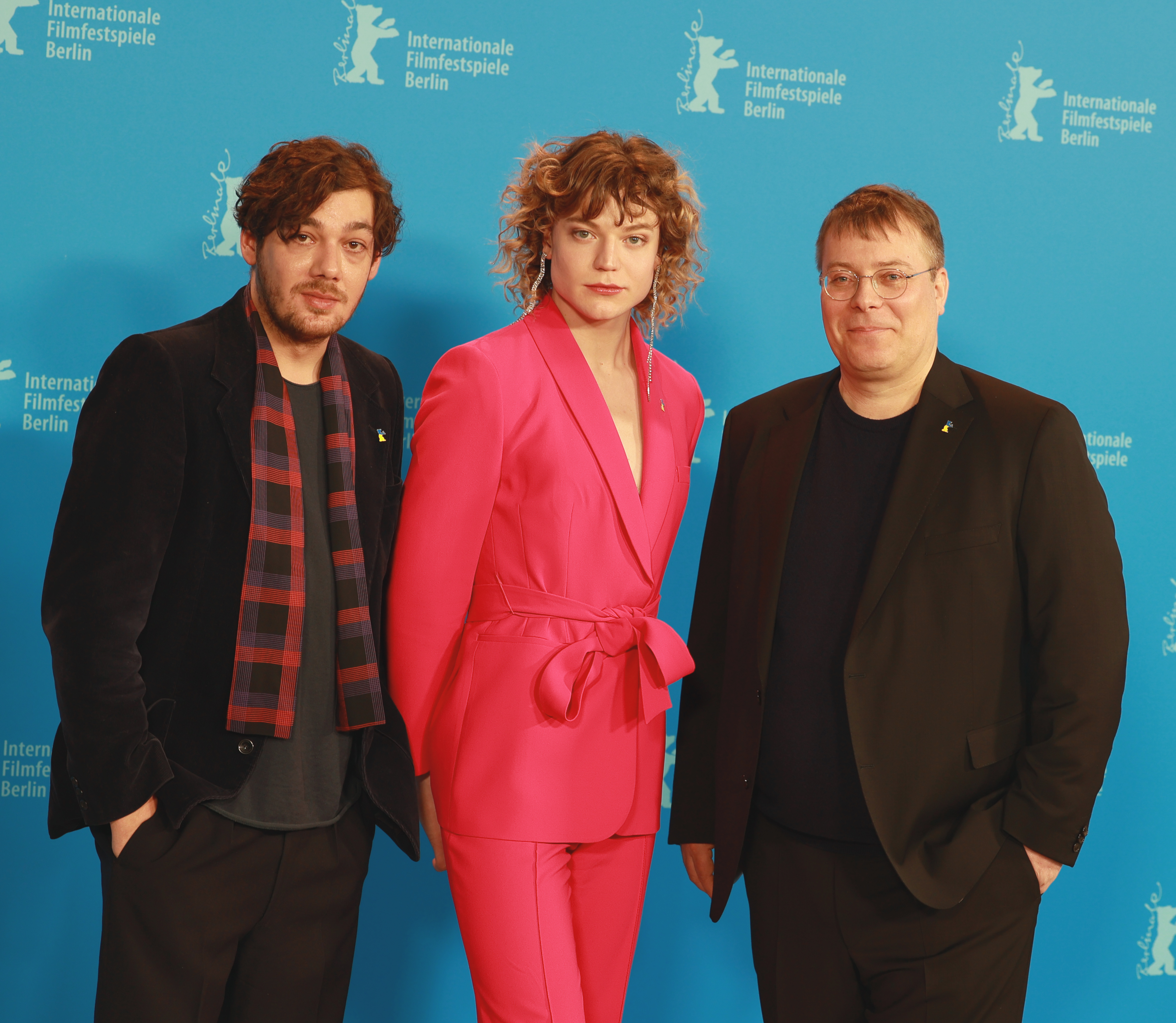
Lead actors Timocin Ziegler and Thea Ehre with the director Christoph Hochhäusler (L to R)

The film was shot from 3 May 2022 to 22 June 2022 in Frankfurt am Main, Cologne. In September 2022, the film was reported to be in the post-production with the autumn of 2023 as a target date for release. It is the fifth collaboration between the director Christoph Hochhäusler and the producer Bettina Brokemper.

== Release ==
Till the End of the Night had its premiere on 24 February 2023 as part of the 73rd Berlin International Film Festival, in Competition. It was released in cinemas on 6 July 2023.

== Reception ==
On the review aggregator Rotten Tomatoes website, the film has an approval rating of 20% based on 5 reviews, with an average rating of 2/10.

David Rooney for The Hollywood Reporter stating that it is "Not worth investigating", concluded writing, "There’s possibly a good story buried in here, but the filmmakers can’t get out of their own way long enough to tell it." Nicholas Bell in IonCinema.com graded the film 1/5 and wrote, "Somehow, Florian Plumeyer’s tediously inept script sabotages not only these themes but also what could have been a striking quartet of viciously unhappy but needy humans."

== Accolades ==
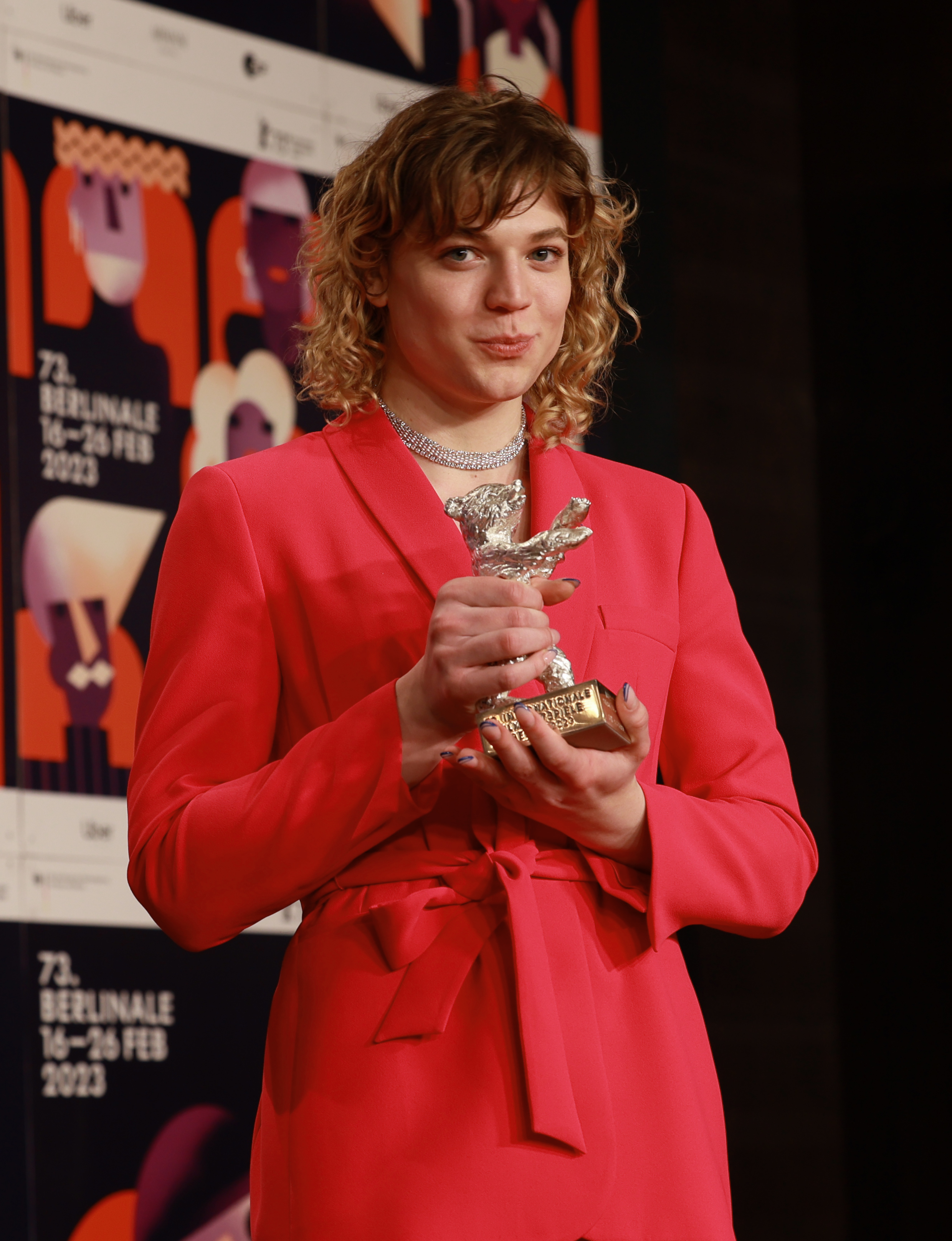
Thea Ehre, winner of Silver Bear for Best Supporting Performance

Award	Date	Category	Recipient	Result	Ref.
Berlin International Film Festival	25 February 2023	Golden Bear	Till the End of the Night	Nominated	
Berlin International Film Festival	25 February 2023	Silver Bear for Best Supporting Performance	Thea Ehre	Won	
Berlin International Film Festival	25 February 2023	Teddy Award for Best Feature Film	Till the End of the Night	Nominated	
Guadalajara International Film Festival	9 June 2023	Maguey Award	Till the End of the Night	Nominated	
