= Gundi Ellert =

German television actress

- Born: 8 September 1951 (age 74); Lengenfeld, Bavaria, West Germany
- Occupation: Actress

Gundi Ellert (born 8 September 1951 in Lengenfeld) is a German actress.

== Selected filmography ==
- Löwengrube – Die Grandauers und ihre Zeit (1989, 2 episodes)
- Sleeper (2005)
- Wedding Fever in Campobello (2009)
- Secret Hope (2015, TV film)
