= Bis in die Spitzen =

- Genre: Drama
- Based on: Cutting It by BBC
- Starring: Jeanette Hain; Muriel Baumeister; Tobias Oertel; Ralph Herforth; Cordula Trantow; Klaus Manchen; Anja Franke; Jasmin Schwiers; Annabelle Mandeng; Oliver Broumis
- Country of origin: Germany
- Original language: German
- No. of seasons: 1
- No. of episodes: 13

Production
- Running time: 45 minutes

Original release
- Network: Sat.1
- Release: October 10, 2005 – January 9, 2006

Bis in die Spitzen (To The Tips) is a German drama television series, based on the British BBC series Cutting It. The series was originally broadcast on Mondays at 21:15, with 13 episodes in total being broadcast on Sat. 1. The original run of the series started on 10 October 2005 and the final episode was broadcast on 9 January 2006.

== Plot ==
Niki and Philipp have been happily married for ten years and run a hairdressing salon together in Berlin. But their life of tranquility does not last long, as Niki's ex-boyfriend Finn appears and sends Niki into an emotional rollercoaster. Finn's wife Mia also decides to open a salon directly across the street and causes a turf war, which is fought on all fronts.

== Reviews and Production ==
Prior to release the series was highly anticipated and praised by critics, but the ratings fell short of expectations. Following poor reviews Sat. 1 announced on 27 December 2005 that the series would be discontinued after the first season (13 episodes); a continuation of the series had originally been planned.

The complete series was first released on DVD on 24 March 2006 as a set of four discs.

== See also ==
- List of German television series
