= Stalingrad (1993 film) =

1993 German war film by Joseph Vilsmaier

- Theatrical release poster
- Directed by: Joseph Vilsmaier
- Written by: Jürgen Büscher; Johannes Heide
- Produced by: Hanno Huth; Günter Rohrbach
- Starring: Dominique Horwitz; Thomas Kretschmann; Jochen Nickel; Sebastian Rudolph; Sylvester Groth; Martin Benrath; Dana Vávrová
- Cinematography: Rolf Greim; Klaus Moderegger; Peter von Haller
- Edited by: Hannes Nikel
- Music by: Norbert Jürgen Schneider; Martin Grassl
- Distributed by: Senator Film
- Release date: 21 January 1993
- Running time: 134 minutes
- Country: Germany
- Language: German
- Box office: $10 million

Stalingrad is a 1993 German anti-war film directed by Joseph Vilsmaier. It follows a platoon of German Army soldiers transferred to the Eastern Front of World War II, where they find themselves fighting in the Battle of Stalingrad.

The film is the second German movie to portray the Battle of Stalingrad. It was preceded by the 1959 Hunde, wollt ihr ewig leben (Stalingrad: Dogs, Do You Want to Live Forever?).

== Plot ==
In August 1942, German soldiers on leave in Cervo, Liguria, Italy, are decorated for their participation at the First Battle of El Alamein and then board a rail transport to the Eastern Front. Unteroffizier Manfred "Rollo" Rohleder and Obergefreiter Fritz Reiser are introduced to Leutnant Hans von Witzland, their inexperienced new platoon leader.

Witzland's platoon is thrown into the Battle of Stalingrad under the command of Hauptmann Hermann Musk. Musk's company suffers heavy casualties in an assault on a factory. Witzland, surrounded in a shattered building with his platoon, arranges a ceasefire with the Soviets so both sides can collect their wounded. One of Witzland's men opens fire during the exchange and a Russian boy named Kolya ends up with the Germans.

The platoon is attacked the next day. Witzland, Reiser, Rollo, Emigholtz, and "G.G." Müller escape through the sewer and Kolya runs away. Witzland gets separated from the others and captures a female Soviet soldier named Irina who offers to lead him to safety, then pushes him into the water and escapes. Witzlan reunites with the squad, and Emigholtz loses a leg to a boobytrap. At a crowded aid station Reiser threatens a doctor's assistant at gunpoint to treat Emigholtz, who dies shortly after. Military Police Hauptmann Haller arrests the men, remembering an earlier encounter with Witzland regarding the treatment of Soviet prisoners.

Four weeks later, Witzland and his men are disarming land mines in a penal battalion, joined by a disgraced officer known only as Otto. Winter has set in and the Soviets have surrounded the German Sixth Army. Hauptmann Musk reassigns the penal battalion to combat duty. The men threaten to mutiny unless their crimes are pardoned and Musk agrees. Shortly after Musk joins Witzland's platoon in repelling a Soviet tank and infantry attack. Witzland and his surviving men are reinstated, and then ordered by Hauptmann Haller to execute civilians accused of sabotage, including Kolya. Despite Reiser's and Witzland's protests, they participate in the executions.

Witzland, G.G., and Reiser decide to desert. They head to Pitomnik Airfield in hopes of catching a plane back to Germany, stealing medical tags from fallen soldiers so they can be evacuated with the wounded. The last transport plane takes off as they arrive at Pitomnik, and the trio return to their shelter where Musk is suffering from severe frostbite. A German supply plane drops provisions near the shelter, but Haller appears and chides them at gunpoint for their lack of discipline. Rollo shoots him with a sub-machine gun, but Haller shoots G.G. as he falls, killing him. Haller pleads for his life and admits to hoarding supplies in a nearby house before Otto executes him.

Musk, Witzland, Otto, Rohleder and Reiser find the house, with cellar shelves stocked with food and liquor. Irina is discovered tied to a bed. Witzland cuts her free. She tries to provoke Witzland into killing her. He refuses, and she balks at committing suicide. The others play cards and unwind until the dying Musk orders them to rejoin the fighting. Otto commits suicide. Rollo carries Musk outside. Musk dies, and Rollo witnesses survivors of the Sixth Army surrendering to the Soviets.

Irina guides Witzland and Reiser away from the city but she is shot by Russian soldiers out on the snowy steppe. Witzland is wounded and becomes too weak to walk. Reiser, cradling Witzland's body in the accumulating snow, freezes to death.

== Cast ==
- Dominique Horwitz as Obergefreiter Fritz Reiser
- Thomas Kretschmann as Leutnant Hans von Witzland
- Jochen Nickel as Unteroffizier Manfred "Rollo" Rohleder
- Sebastian Rudolph as Soldat "GeGe" Müller (nicknamed GeGe to distinguish him from other Müllers)
- Dana Vávrová as Irina
- Martin Benrath as Generalmajor Hentz (based on Generaloberst Walter Heitz)
- Sylvester Groth as Unteroffizier Otto (formerly a commissioned officer)
- Karel Heřmánek as Hauptmann Hermann Musk
- Heinz Emigholz as Funker (Radioman) Edgar Emigholz
- Ferdinand Schuster as Double Edgar
- Oliver Broumis as Soldat Müller (HGM)
- Dieter Okras as Hauptmann Haller
- Zdeněk Vencl as Gefreiter Wölk
- Mark Kuhn as Feldwebel Pflüger
- Thorsten Bolloff as Soldat Feldmann
- Alexander Wachholz as Pfarrer Renner
- J. Alfred Mehnert as Oberleutnant Lupo
- Ulrike Arnold as Viola
- Christian Knoepfle as Soldat Dieter
- Filip Čáp as Ludwig
- Jaroslav Tomsa as Opa Erwin (Grandpa Erwin)
- Pavel Mang as Kolya
- Otto Ševčík as Major Kock (as Oto Sevcik)
- Jophi Ries as Schröder

== Production and release ==
The film was shot in several locations, including Finland, Italy, and Czechoslovakia, and cost approximately DEM 20 million (around EUR 10 million in modern German currency). Director Joseph Vilsmaier hired a German military consultant to advise him on set. A series entitled The making of Stalingrad was released, featuring a behind-the-scenes look at the film. Stalingrad was released on 4K Blu-ray in 2021.

== Reception ==
In 1993, the film won Bavarian Film Awards for Best Cinematography, Best Editing and Best Production. It was also entered into the 18th Moscow International Film Festival.

The film grossed $10 million in Germany and grossed $152,972 in the United States and Canada.

== See also ==
- Stalingrad (1990 film)
- Stalingrad (2013 film)
