= Sleeper (2005 film) =

2005 film

- Film poster
- Directed by: Benjamin Heisenberg
- Written by: Benjamin Heisenberg
- Produced by: Jessica Hausner; Bruno Wagner
- Starring: Bastian Trost; Mehdi Nebbou
- Cinematography: Reinhold Vorschneider
- Edited by: Karina Ressler
- Production company: coop99 filmproduktion
- Release date: 19 May 2005
- Running time: 100 minutes
- Countries: Austria; Germany
- Language: German

Sleeper (German: Schläfer) is a 2005 Austrian-German drama film directed by Benjamin Heisenberg. It was screened in the Un Certain Regard section at the 2005 Cannes Film Festival.

== Cast ==
- Bastian Trost - Johannes Mehrveldt
- Mehdi Nebbou - Farid Atabay
- Loretta Pflaum - Beate Werner
- Gundi Ellert - Frau Wasser
- Wolfgang Pregler - Professor Behringer
- Charlotte Eschmann - Johannes' Grandmother
- Ludwig Bang - Secret service agent
- Masayuki Akiyoshi - Fei Li
- Marco Schuler - Robert Königsbauer
- Jürgen Geißendörfer - Markus
- Dominik Dudy - LAN-student
- Andrea Faciu - Singer
- Gordana Stevic - Mrs. Stevic
- Christine Böhm - Mrs. Schmid
- Anke Euler - Animal Nurse
