= Superegos =

2014 film

- Film poster
- Directed by: Benjamin Heisenberg
- Written by: Benjamin Heisenberg; Josef Lechner
- Starring: André Wilms
- Release dates: 9 February 2014 (Berlin); 8 May 2014 (Germany)
- Running time: 100 minutes
- Country: Germany
- Language: German
- Box office: $345.215

Superegos (German: Über-Ich und Du) is a 2014 German drama film directed by Benjamin Heisenberg. The film had its premiere in the Panorama section of the 64th Berlin International Film Festival.

== Plot ==
Nick Gutlicht is a petty thief who lives off dealing in stolen property, namely illegal resale of stolen valuable books. Unfortunately, Nick also owes money to another criminal gang and needs to conceal his whereabouts from them. By chance he ends up in the lavish property of famous, elderly former Nazi philosopher Curt Ledig. Despite his periodic amnesia and fear of kitchens, Ledig refuses to move in with his concerned daughter. Nick is hired by Ledig's daughter and family to act as a caregiver for Nick. Now Curt can work on a presentation for his upcoming symposium, which nobody thinks he can achieve any longer. Nick thinks he has a convenient bolt hole to hide from apprehension for his misdeeds. This partnership of convenience of these two incompatible cohabiting individuals develops into a difficult situation. Curt regards Nick as an ideal research subject and exposes him to repeatedly inexplicable acts of "therapy". For Nick, his new situation represents a unique opportunity to increase his lagging finances with the contents of Curt's library.

Meanwhile, Nick's casual lover and fence, Norah, is fed up with his internal problems with committing to their relationship. Nick's criminal creditors are heading toward Ledig's premises at Ammerssee, led by a dubious older female underworld figure known only as “Mother”. Curt's family has also decided to visit him - and Nick is beginning to experience some positive outcomes from his involuntary therapeutic episodes with Curt. The fates of the odd couple become interravelled, until a dramatic therapeutic conclusion in the solitude of an alpine evening leads to a startling resolution.

== Cast ==
- André Wilms as Curt Ledig
- Georg Friedrich as Nick Gutlicht
- Bettina Stucky as Rosa
- Susanne Wolff as Norah
- Elisabeth Orth as Frau Tischmann
- Maria Hofstätter as Mutter
- Margarita Broich as Fanny
- Markus Schleinzer as Jasper
- Michael Wittenborn as Moderator
