= This Very Moment =

- This Very Moment DVD cover
- Directed by: Christoph Hochhäusler
- Written by: Benjamin Heisenberg; Christoph Hochhäusler
- Produced by: Clarens Grollmann
- Starring: Miroslaw Baka; Horst-Günter Marx; Judith Engel
- Distributed by: Royal Film
- Release date: 10 February 2003 (Berlin Film Festival)
- Running time: 87 minutes
- Country: Germany
- Languages: German, Polish

This Very Moment (German: Milchwald) is a 2003 German film directed by Christoph Hochhäusler.
