= Rudolf Virchow Center =

German research institute

Coordinates: 49.801°N 9.956°E

Rudolf Virchow Center, DFG Research Center for Integrative and Translational Bioimaging, University of Würzburg
- Mission: Basic Research
- Focus: Science, Biology, Medicine
- Key people: Martin J. Lohse (chair)
- Members: 200
- Location: Würzburg
- Website: http://www.rudolf-virchow-zentrum.de

The Rudolf Virchow Center (RVZ) is the DFG Research Center for Integrative and Translational Bioimaging of the University of Würzburg. It was started in 2001 as one of three German Centers of Excellence funded by the German Research Foundation, DFG. Its founding chairman is Martin J. Lohse, a former coworker of Robert Lefkowitz at Duke University.

== Research ==
The center derives its name from the pathologist Rudolf Virchow, who was a professor in Würzburg from 1849 to 1856 and was the first to postulate that diseases originated in dysfunctions of cells. Researchers at the Rudolf Virchow Center aim to trace diseases back to dysfunctions of proteins. These are called target proteins because they may serve as targets for diagnostic tools or for therapeutic drugs. Research is organized in four fields:

(1) Protein structure and function
(2) Proteins in cellular signaling
(3) Nucleic acid-binding proteins
(4) Proteins in cell-cell interactions.

The Rudolf Virchow Center also organizes a graduate program and several undergraduate programs in biomedicine and experimental medicine. Its Public Science Center offers courses for children and high school students and public events.
