= Die Schule am See =

- Starring: Mareike Carrière
- Country of origin: Germany

Die Schule am See is a German television series.

== See also ==
- List of German television series
