= Austrian New Wave =

Cohort of Austrian filmmakers

Austrian New Wave is a loosely defined label for a cohort of contemporary Austrian filmmakers who blur boundaries between arthouse, documentary, experimental, and genre cinema.

== Overview ==
The term has been used by film journalist Christian Fuchs and others to describe an energetic "new wave" in Austrian filmmaking that emerged in the 2010s and 2020s. They specifically use the English term "Austrian New Wave" and define it as a generational movement characterized by creative risk-taking and a relaxed attitude toward the boundaries between art and commerce, combining openness to genre forms with respect for Austria's arthouse traditions. This situates the cohort in dialogue with earlier Austrian cinema (e.g., Michael Haneke), while emphasizing contemporary pop-cultural and transmedia influences.

Recurring traits among filmmakers associated with the label include:

- Boundary-crossing aesthetics: mixing arthouse, documentary, experimental forms with horror, comedy, sci-fi and other genres.
- Risk-friendly sensibility: willingness to deviate from austere, linear styles traditionally associated with parts of German-language arthouse cinema.
- Hybrid art/commerce stance: a "looser" view of the line between artistic and popular cinema.
- Intergenerational dialogue: younger directors engaging with, and sometimes reacting to, the legacy of figures such as Michael Haneke.

== Representative filmmakers ==
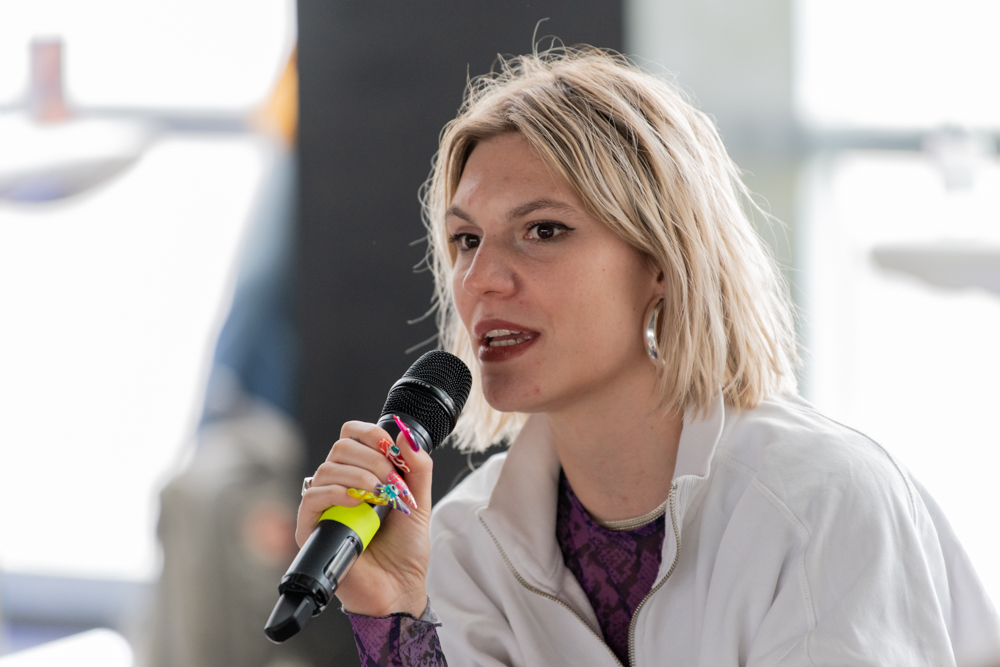
Elena Wolff, 2022.

Fuchs lists or invokes the following names when sketching the Austrian New Wave:

- Kurdwin Ayub
- Sebastian Brauneis
- Jasmin Baumgartner
- Johannes Grenzfurthner
- Olga Kosanovic
- David Lapuch
- Mwita Mataro
- Florian Pochlatko
- Lorenz Uhl
- Bernhard Wenger
- Elena Wolff

As connective figures across generations, Fuchs cites the duo Veronika Franz and Severin Fiala, and he notes the importance of established filmmakers such as Jessica Hausner and Marie Kreutzer, as well as producers Arash T. Riahi and Arman T. Riahi, in enabling the scene. Early tendencies have also been observed by other writers, for example von Dassanowsky and Speck, who researched the Austrian film scene in the 1990s and 2000s.

== Context ==
The label is positioned against long-standing external clichés of Austrian cinema as austere or "feel-bad," arguing that recent works display a wider range of tones, pop sensibilities, and genre fluency while still retaining distinctly Austrian themes and textures.

Filmmakers in Austria often work under tight financial constraints. As Jamie Steele notes, even state-supported projects rely on fragmented funding and modest budgets. This precarious landscape pushes directors toward hybrid forms and inventive low-cost strategies, shaping a distinct cinematic style.

Sabrina Gärtner argues that there was already a nouvelle vague in Austrian filmmaking at the beginning of the 21st century. It remains unclear whether this should be regarded as a first wave or as a completely different phenomenon, since it does not correspond to the filmmaking agenda outlined by Fuchs. In Gärtner's paper, she addresses this unfilled research gap.

== See also ==
- Cinema of Austria
