= The Drifter (2010 film) =

2010 German film

- Eine flexible Frau
- Directed by: Tatjana Turanskyj
- Written by: Tatjana Turanskyj
- Produced by: Jan Ahlrichs; Tatjana Turanskyj
- Starring: Mira Partecke
- Edited by: Ricarda Zinke
- Music by: Niels Lorenz
- Release date: 2010
- Running time: 97 minutes
- Country: Germany
- Language: German

The Drifter (German: Eine flexible Frau) is a 2010 German film directed by Tatjana Turanskyj.

A 40-year-old female architect in Berlin loses her job and has to get along with identity, job centre and the loss of her social status.

== Cast ==
- Mira Partecke: Greta M.
- Katharina Bellena: economist Loretta
- Sven Seeger: dancer Sven
- Laura Tonke: callcenter boss Ann
- Torsten Haase: dancer Torsten
- Fabio Pink: dancer Fabio
- Michaela Benn: architect Marlene
- Ilia Papatheodorou: architect Francesca
- Thorsten Heidel: fellow student Max
- Andina Weiler: secretary Fee
- Angelika Sautter: Kracht
- Anna Schmidt: callcenter agent Annuschka

== Awards ==
- 2010: nomination for the Teddy Award, the queer film award of the 60th Berlin International Film Festival
- Drehbuchstipendium von der Berliner Künstlerinnenförderung des Senats (Eine flexible Frau, High Potential)
