= Christoph Hochhäusler =

German film director

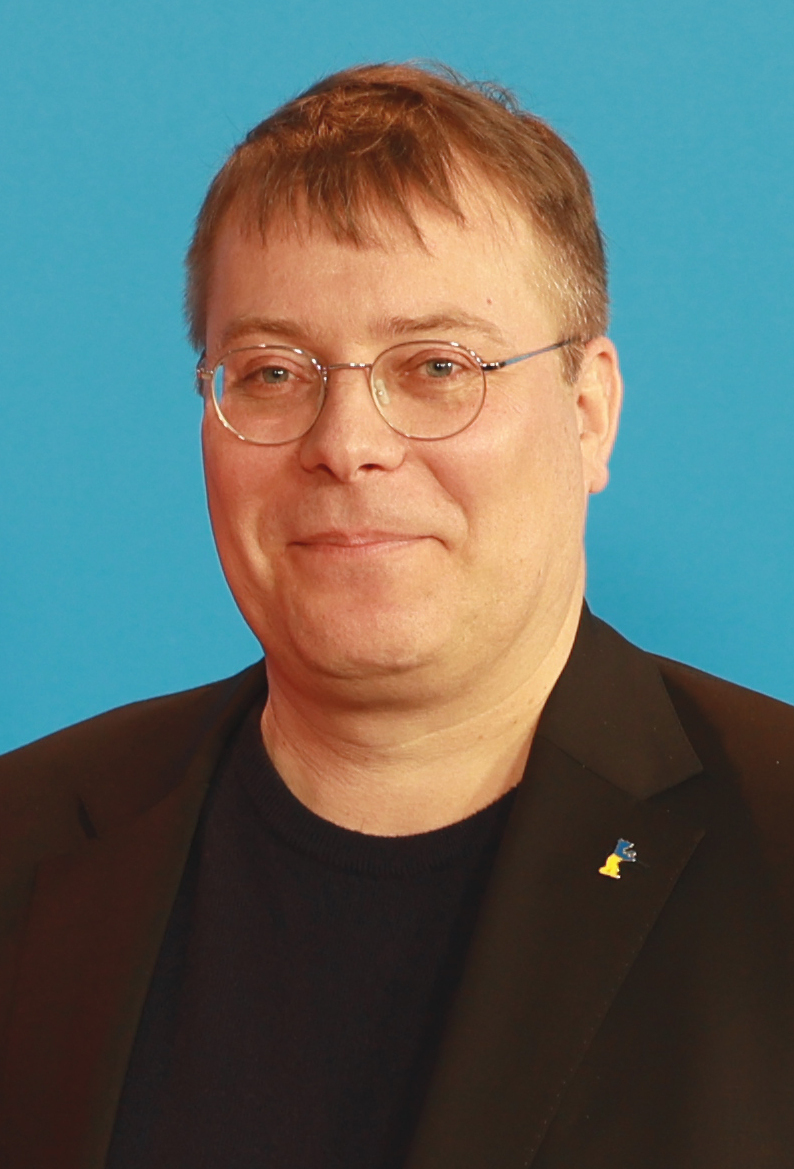
- Hochhäusler in 2023
- Born: 10 July 1972 (age 53); Munich, West Germany
- Occupations: Film director, screenwriter
- Years active: 1998–present

Christoph Hochhäusler (born 10 July 1972) is a German film director and screenwriter. His film Falscher Bekenner was screened in the Un Certain Regard section at the 2005 Cannes Film Festival. His film The City Below was screened in the Un Certain Regard section at the 2010 Cannes Film Festival.

At the 73rd Berlin International Film Festival, Hochhäusler's 2023 film Till the End of the Night was one of the nominees for the Berlinale's Golden Bear. It was nominated for the Teddy Award for Best Feature Film, and one of the film's stars, Thea Ehre, received the Silver Bear for Best Supporting Performance.

== Filmography ==
- Fieber (1998)
- Milchwald (2003)
- Falscher Bekenner (2005)
- Deutschland 09 – 13 kurze Filme zur Lage der Nation (2009)
- The City Below (2010)
- Dreileben: One Minute of Darkness (2011)
- The Lies of the Victors (2014)
- Till the End of the Night (2023)
- Death Will Come (2024)
