= Benjamin Heisenberg =

German film director

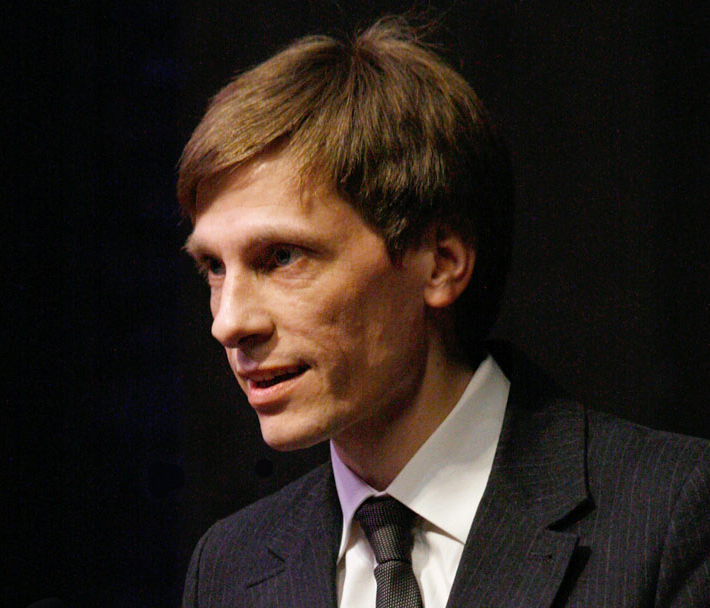
- Born: 9 June 1974 (age 51); Tübingen, West Germany
- Occupations: Film director, screenwriter
- Years active: 1996-present

Benjamin Heisenberg (born 9 June 1974) is a German film director and screenwriter. He has directed sixteen films since 1995. His film Schläfer was screened in the Un Certain Regard section at the 2005 Cannes Film Festival. His 2010 film, The Robber, was nominated for the Golden Bear at the 60th Berlin International Film Festival.

He is the grandson of Nobel Prize-winning physicist Werner Heisenberg, via his father Martin Heisenberg. He is co-editor and co-publisher of the German film magazine Revolver.

== Early life ==
Benjamin Heisenberg was born in Tübingen, West Germany to Martin Heisenberg and Apollonia, Countess of Eulenburg. His father was professor of neurobiology at the University of Würzburg, and Benjamin grew up in small village near there. In 1993, he studied at the academy of fine arts in Munich. He finished his studies in 1998, winning the "Debütantenpreis", given to the three best students of the year.

== Filmography ==
- 1995: Es zogen einst (shortfilm)
- 1996: Terremoto (shortfilm)
- 1997: Hastewas, Bistewas (shortfilm)
- 1998: Alles wieder still (shortfilm)
- 2000: Der Bombenkönig (shortfilm)
- 2002: Am See (shortfilm)
- 2003: This Very Moment (German: Milchwald) (co-writer)
- 2004: Die Gelegenheit (shortfilm)
- 2004–2005: Meier, Müller, Schmidt I–III (shortfilm)
- 2005: Sleeper
- 2005: La Paz (shortfilm)
- 2007: On Fiction (shortfilm)
- 2007: On Manipulation (shortfilm)
- 2007: On Romance (shortfilm)
- 2010: The Robber
- 2014: Superegos
- 2015: Brienner 45 (14 Films – Co-Producer/Co-director)
- 2015: Das unsichbare Dritte (shortfilm)
- 2015: Waterfall (shortfilm)
- 2015: War of the Worlds (shortfilm)
- 2015: Opfer (shortfilm)
- 2015: Mon Oncle (shortfilm)

== Awards ==
- 2000: Award for the best Diploma of the Academy of Fine Arts, Munich
- 2001: Award in the section Fine Arts of the city of Munich
- 2004: Starter Film Award of the city of Munich, for The Opportunity
- 2004: Grand Prix du Jury (Films D’Écoles Européens), Angers European First Film Festival, for The Opportunity
- 2005: First Steps Award for Sleeper
- 2005: Midas Award, Europaws, for best fiction drama set in science and technology, London, for Sleeper
- 2005: Award for Best Movie in the Section Perspectives Cinéma Tout Ecran, Geneva for Sleeper
- 2006: Special Award of the Jury, Angers European First Film Festival, for Sleeper
- 2006: Max-Ophüls-Preis (Award for Best Film, Best Script, Best Music) for Sleeper
- 2006: Award for Best Movie, FilmArtFestival Mecklenburg-Pomerania for Sleeper
- 2006: Award for Best Movie, Festival du Cinéma Politique, Barcelona, for Sleeper
- 2006: Bavarian Culture Award of the E. ON Bayern AG
- 2006: Young Talent Award of the DEFA-Foundation
- 2010: Bavarian Film Award, Category Best Young Director, for The Robber
- 2010: Special Award of the Bloggers, Festival Paris Cinema, for The Robber
- 2010: Award for Best Director, Palic Film Festival, for The Robber
- 2010: Award for Best Film, Maverick, Calgary International Film Festival, for The Robber
- 2010: Audience Award and Special Mention of the Jury, La Roche Sur Yon International Film Festival, for The Robber
- 2010: Award for Best Film, Zagreb Film Festival, for The Robber
- 2010: Award for Best Script, Gijón International Film Festival, for The Robber
- 2010: Culture Award of the city of Würzburg
- 2011: Austrian Film Award, Best Director for The Robber
- 2011: Award for Best Movie, Jameson Dublin International Film Festival for The Robber

== Exhibitions (selection) ==
- 1995 "München liegt am Meer", Munich
- 1996 "Paternoster" in the first Munich Highrise (Group Exhibition).
- 1999 "Benjamnin Heisenberg", Gallery Kampl, Kunstforum München.
- 2000 "Multiple Choice" Group Exhibition in the BBK, Galerie der Künstler, Munich (Group Exhibition).
- 2000 "Ausstellung der Debütanten" (Drawings 1993 – 99), Academy of Fine Arts, Munich (Group Exhibition, Künstlerbuch).
- 2001 Exhibition for the Sponsorship Award for fine arts of the city of Munich, (Group Exhibition, Catalog).
- 2002 "Stories — Narrative Structures in Contemporary Art", curated by Stephanie Rosenthal, Haus der Kunst, Munich (Group Exhibition; Catalog).
- 2002 "Intermedium 2", Center for Art and Media Karlsruhe (ZKM) (Group Exhibition; Catalog).
- 2004 "Rote Zelle", graduates of the class of Olaf Metzel, Academy of Fine Arts, Munich, Rote Zelle, Munich (Group Exhibition; Catalog).
- 2005 "Playtime! Play, Gaming and Sports", Institute of Contemporary Arts (ICA), London (Group Exhibition).
- 2005 "Say No Productions 2", Gallery Klüser, Munich (Group Exhibition).
- 2005 "Favoriten", Lenbachhaus, Kunstbau, Munich (Group Exhibition, Catalog).
- 2005 "Neue Heimat" Rathausgalerie, Munich (Group Exhibition, Catalog).
- 2006 "Sichtbarkeiten", Edith Ruß-House for Media and Arts, Oldenburg (Group Exhibition).
- 2007 "Artmix", Haus der Kunst, Munich / Bayerischer Rundfunk (Group Exhibition).
- 2007 "Pictograms - The Loneliness of Signs", Stiftung Kunstmuseum Stuttgart (Group Exhibition, Catalog).
- 2011 "Benjamin Heisenberg", Gallery Patrick Ebensperger, Berlin
- 2011 "ER", Kunstbüro Wien (together with Clemens Krauss).
- 2013 The Videonale festival of contemporary video art, Bonn.
- 2013 "Koste es was es wolle", Oechsner Gallery, Nürnberg (together with Olaf Unverzart).
- 2013 Gallery Patrick Ebensperger, Berlin (Group Exhibition).
- 2013 "The Berlin Film School“, The Museum of Modern Art, MoMA, New York, USA (Catalog)
- 2015 "Brienner 45", NS-Dokumentationszentrum (Munich) (permanent Installation; Publikation).
- 2015 "Benjamin Heisenberg I of II: Money Changes Everything" (Works on Paper), Gallery Patrick Ebensperger, Berlin.
- 2016 "Benjamin Heisenberg II of II: Ausradiert" (Videos), Gallery Patrick Ebensperger, Berlin.
