= Vienna Film Academy =

Institute of the University of Music and Performing Arts Vienna

Coordinates: 48°11′48″N 16°22′56″E

Film Academy Vienna
- Filmakademie Wien
- Type: Public
- Established: 1952
- President: Claudia Walkensteiner-Preschl
- Location: Vienna, Austria

The Film Academy Vienna (Filmakademie Wien) is the Institute for Film and Television at the University of Music and Performing Arts, Vienna.

== Curriculum ==
The offered programs (Bachelor/Master's degree) are:

- Directing
- Screenwriting
- Cinematography
- Editing
- Production

There is also a Digital Art - Compositing program (Master only).

During the first two years of study, students take classes in all programs, before they specialize in the field of study they applied for.

== Application ==
The application process takes place once a year: After completing given assignments, some of the applicants will be invited for one week of tests and interviews. The Filmacademy Vienna admits 15 to 20 new students per year.

== Faculty ==
The current faculty consists of internationally acclaimed filmmakers:

- Michael Haneke and Wolfgang Murnberger in directing
- Götz Spielmann, Sandra Bohle and Kathrin Resetarits in screenwriting
- Wolfgang Thaler and Thomas Benesch in cinematography
- Michael Hudecek in editing
- Franz Brandstaetter in digital-art compositing
- Danny Krausz in production
