= German resistance to Nazism =

Opposition to Nazi Germany

- Part of Nazi Germany and World War II
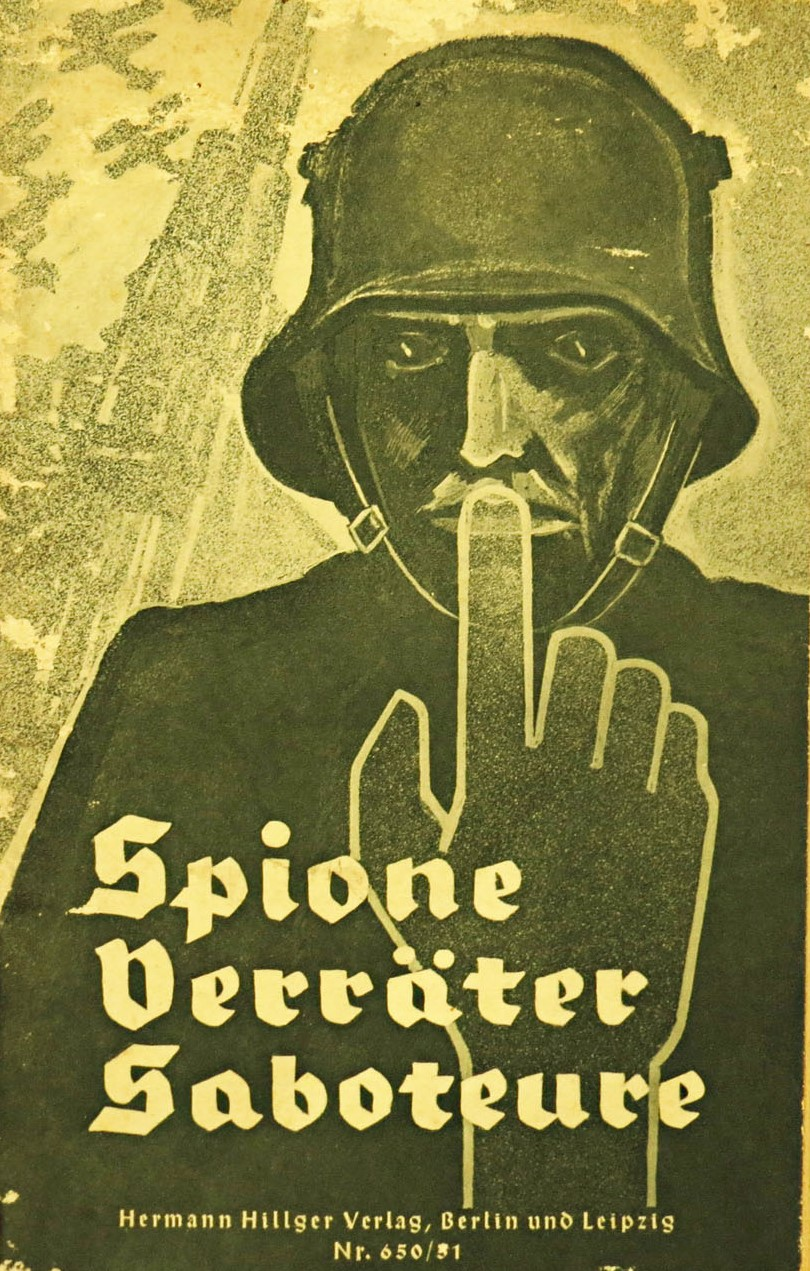
- Cover of the Nazi propaganda brochure "Spies, Traitors, Saboteurs" (1938)
Date	1933–1945
Location	Nazi Germany and German-occupied Europe
Result	Failure to overthrow the Nazi regime before its military defeat: Most organized resistance groups were suppressed; Thousands of resistance members were imprisoned, deported, or executed; The 20 July plot failed to overthrow Adolf Hitler

Belligerents
Nazi Germany: Gestapo; SS; SD; Wehrmacht elements loyal to Hitler; People's Court	German resistance: KPD resistance; SPD resistance; Rote Kapelle; White Rose; Kreisau Circle; Confessing Church; 20 July plot; Edelweiss Pirates; Swing Kids

Commanders and leaders
Adolf Hitler (WIA); Heinrich Himmler; Reinhard Heydrich †; Ernst Kaltenbrunner (executed)	Ernst Thälmann (executed); Anton Saefkow (executed); Franz Jacob (executed); Bernhard Bästlein (executed); Robert Abshagen (executed); Ernst Schneller (executed); Otto Schmirgal (executed); Rose Schlösinger (executed); Kurt Schlosser (executed) Ludwig Beck (executed); Hans Oster (executed); Wilhelm Canaris (executed); Henning von Tresckow; Friedrich Olbricht (executed); Claus Schenk Graf von Stauffenberg (executed); Carl Friedrich Goerdeler (executed) Arvid Harnack (executed); Harro Schulze-Boysen (executed) Dietrich Bonhoeffer (executed)

Strength
Gestapo, SS, SD, police and other state security forces	Numerous decentralized groups and underground networks; no unified command

Casualties and losses
Unknown	77,000 were executed

The German resistance to Nazism (German: Widerstand gegen den Nationalsozialismus) included both unarmed and armed opposition and disobedience to the Nazi regime by various movements, groups, and individuals by various means, including attempts to assassinate Adolf Hitler or to overthrow his regime, defections to the Allies, acts of sabotage against the German Army and the apparatus of repression, attempts to organize an armed struggle and open protests, the rescue of persecuted persons, the harboring of dissidence, and acts of "everyday resistance".

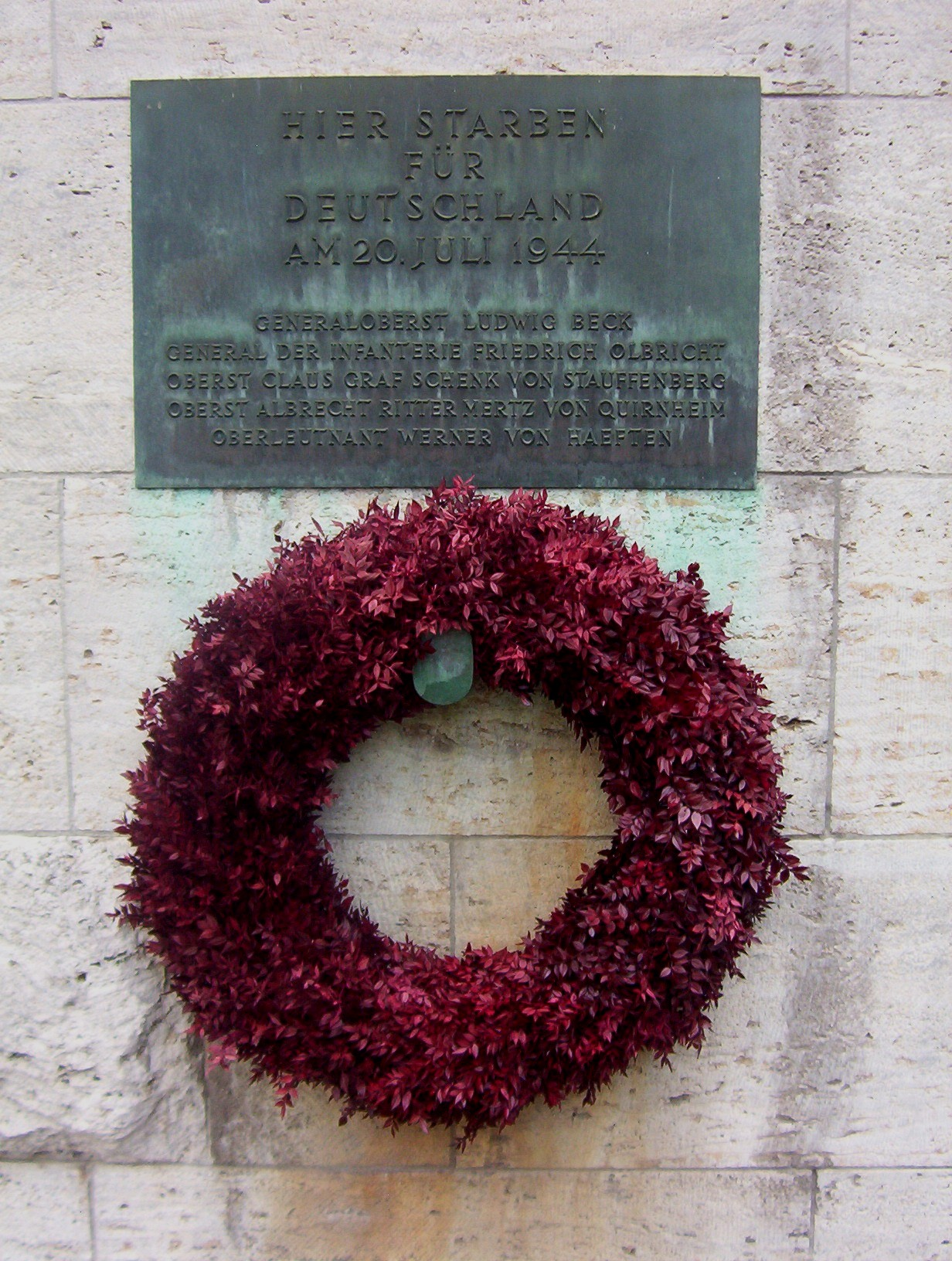
Memorial plaque for resistance members and wreath at the Bendlerblock, Berlin

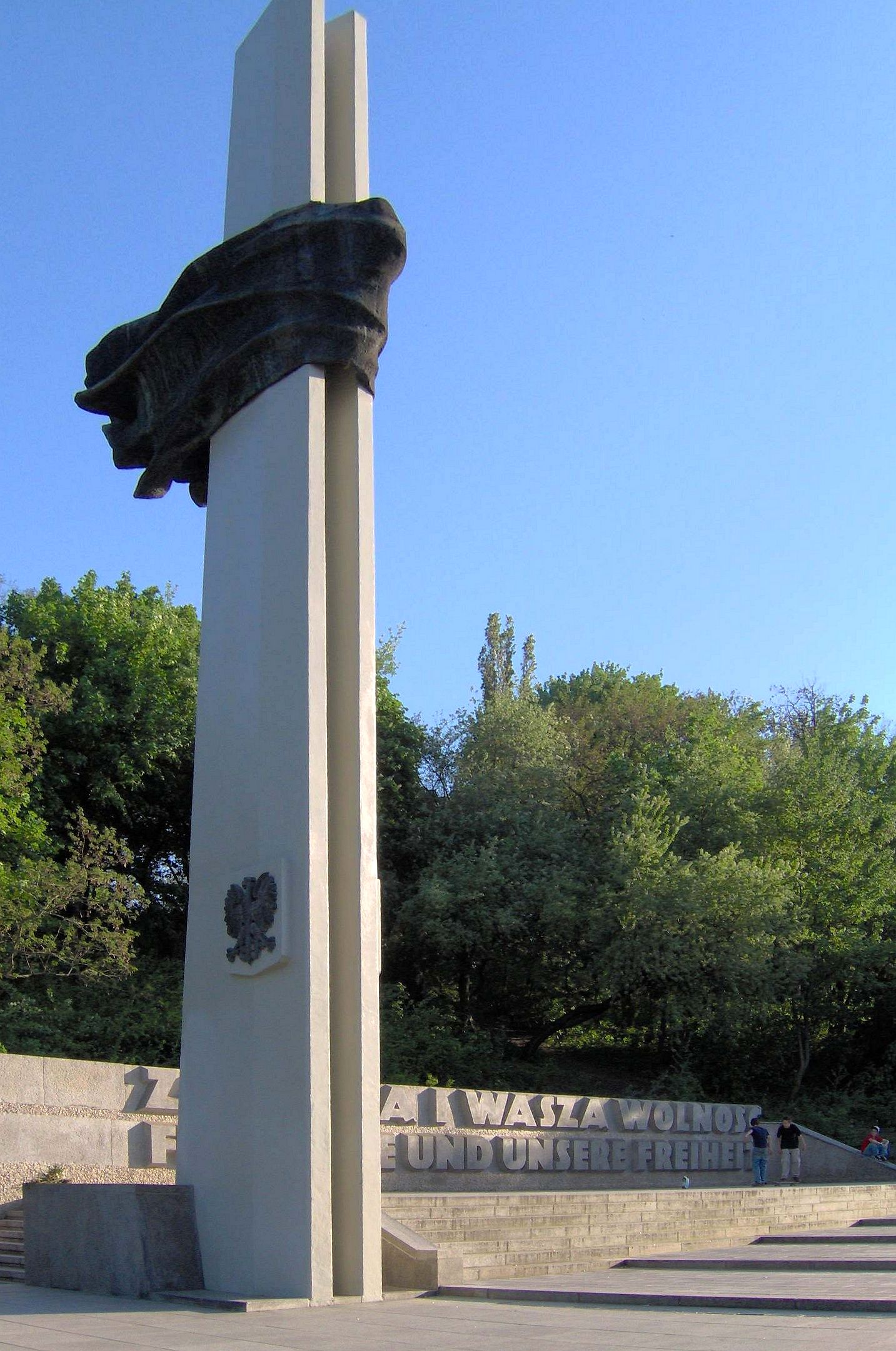
The Memorial to Polish Soldiers and German Anti-Fascists 1939–1945 in Berlin

It was not a united resistance movement, unlike the more organised efforts in other countries, such as Italy, Denmark, the Soviet Union, Poland, Greece, Yugoslavia, France, the Netherlands, Czechoslovakia, and Norway. It consisted of small, isolated groups that were unable to mobilise mass opposition, which severely limited their operations. It had no unified leadership or common agenda because its members had a wide spectrum of backgrounds and goals. The resistance included members of the Polish minority, who formed resistance groups like Olimp.

Some leaders of the Wehrmacht considered attempting a coup d'état against the regime; the 20 July plot of 1944 against Hitler was intended to trigger such a coup. Although the plot was more a rebellion against Hitler than Nazism per se, there was still opposition to his ideas in the Wehrmacht even before the war. Hundreds of thousands of Germans deserted from the Wehrmacht, many defecting to the Allies or anti-fascist resistance forces. After 1943, the Soviet Union made attempts to launch guerrilla warfare in Germany with such defectors and allowed the members of the National Committee for a Free Germany, which consisted mostly of the German prisoners of war, to participate in the military operations of the Red Army and form small military units.

As World War II turned against the Axis, secret peace negotiations with the Allies floundered. The German resistance made unreasonable demands—sometimes including retention of some of the conquered territories—while the Allies insisted on unconditional surrender.

It has been estimated that during the course of the war, 800,000 Germans were arrested by the Gestapo for resistance activities. It has also been estimated that between 15,000 and 77,000 Germans were executed. Resistance members were usually tried, mostly in show trials, by Sondergerichte (Special Courts), courts-martial, People's Courts, and the civil justice system. Many of the Germans had served in government, the military, or in civil positions, which enabled them to engage in subversion and conspiracy. The Canadian historian Peter Hoffmann counts unspecified "tens of thousands" in Nazi concentration camps who were either suspected of or engaged in opposition.

== Overview ==
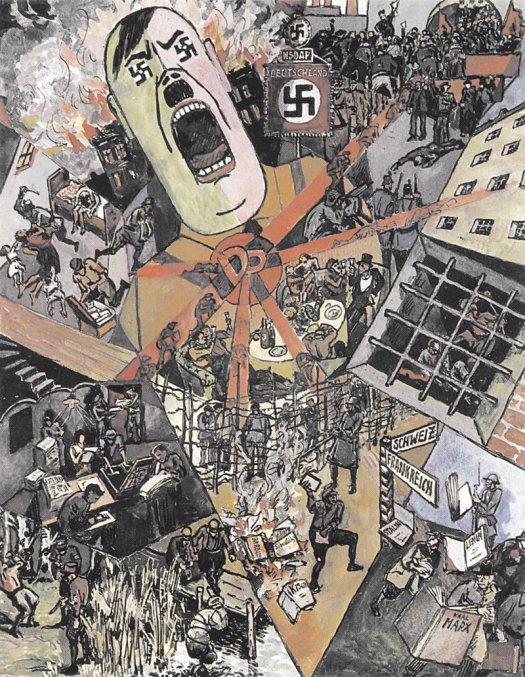
"The Third Reich", 1934 painting by the anti-Nazi exile German painter Heinrich Vogeler

Historiographical debates on the subject on Widerstand (resistance) have often featured intense arguments about the nature, extent, and effectiveness of resistance in the Third Reich. There has been debate about what to define as Widerstand. During the Cold War, West Germany (BRD) and East Germany (DDR) developed different images of the German resistance, as in the BRD the conservative groups, namely the White Rose and the 20 July plotters, were canonized, while the other groups and individuals were barely appreciated or denied; in the DDR, the Communist resistance was idolized to create a mythos in the foundation of the self-image of the DDR.

The German opposition and resistance movements consisted of disparate political and ideological factions that represented different classes of German society who seldom were able to work together. For much of the time, there was little or no contact between these groups. Although some civilian resistance groups developed, they were unable to launch a full-scale movement. There was no alternate pole of loyalty (such as a government in exile) that could legitimise resistance. Conservative historians of the German resistance contended that the Army was the only organisation with the capacity to overthrow the government and that the only valid strategy of the resistance was an elitist one that suggested "eliminating Hitler in a single stroke"; a few officers came to present the most serious threat to the Nazi regime. On the other hand, the Marxist-Leninist historians from the DDR argued that lack of democratic support was one of the reasons why the attempts of the army to assassinate Hitler had failed. However, the relationship between the army and the civil resistance were more complex and gradually evolved; while the representatives of the workers' movement sought contacts with the army, at first, the plotters did not even question whether public support was needed, but eventually they came, partly due to the reaction on the activities of the National Committee for a Free Germany, to the conclusion of the necessity of a democratic "people's movement" (German: Volksbewegung) which would turn the assassination into a starting point of political resistance and break the loyalty of the population to the Nazi system, although the plotters had no concrete plans or personnel consequences. This may be seen as the various resistance movements adapting and coming together. The Foreign Office and the Abwehr (Military Intelligence) also provided support to the movement. Many of those in the military who ultimately chose to seek to overthrow Adolf Hitler had initially supported the regime, if not all of its methods. Hitler's 1938 purge of the military was accompanied by increased militancy in the Nazification of Germany, a sharp intensification of the persecution of Jews, homosexuals, trade union leaders, and aggressive foreign policy, bringing Germany to the brink of war; it was at this time that the German resistance emerged.

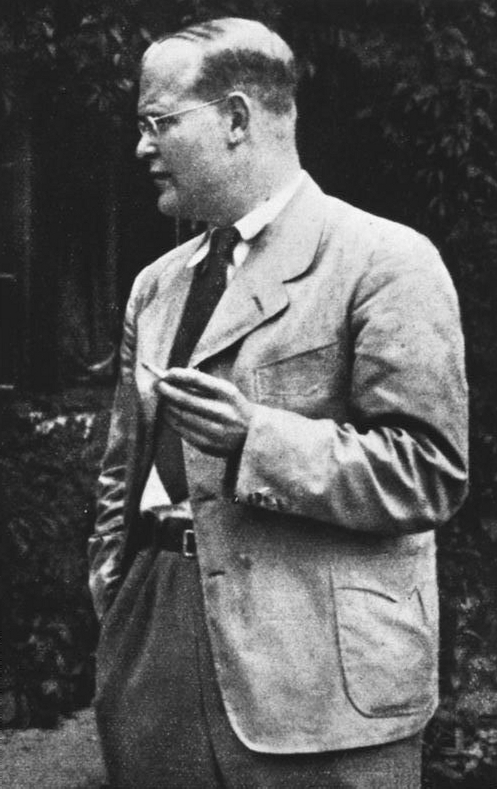
Dietrich Bonhoeffer at Sigurdshof, 1939

Those opposing the Nazi regime were motivated by such factors as the mistreatment of Jews, harassment of the churches, and the harsh actions of Himmler and the Gestapo. In his history of the German resistance, Peter Hoffmann wrote that "National Socialism was not simply a party like any other; with its total acceptance of criminality it was an incarnation of evil, so that all those whose minds were attuned to democracy, Christianity, freedom, humanity, or even mere legality found themselves forced into alliance." Banned underground political parties were one source of opposition. These included the Social Democrats (SPD)—with its paramilitary group the Iron Front and activists such as Julius Leber, the Communists (KPD), and the anarcho-syndicalist group the Freie Arbeiter Union (FAUD), that distributed anti-Nazi propaganda and assisted people in fleeing the country. Another group, the Red Orchestra (Rote Kapelle), consisted of anti-fascists, communists, and American Mildred Harnack. The individuals in this group began to assist their Jewish friends as early as 1933.

Whereas the German Christian movement sought to create a new, positive Christianity aligned with Nazi ideology, some Christian churches, Catholic and Protestant, contributed another source of opposition. Their stance was symbolically significant. The churches, as institutions, did not openly advocate for the overthrow of the Nazi state, but they remained one of the very few German institutions to retain some independence from the state and were able to continue to co-ordinate a level of opposition to Government policies. They resisted the regime's efforts to intrude on ecclesiastical autonomy, but from the beginning, a minority of clergy expressed broader reservations about the new order and gradually their criticisms came to form a "coherent, systematic critique of many of the teachings of National Socialism". Some priests—such as the Jesuits Alfred Delp and Augustin Rösch and the Lutheran preacher Dietrich Bonhoeffer—were active and influential within the clandestine resistance, while figures such as Protestant Pastor Martin Niemöller (who founded the Confessing Church), and the Catholic Bishop Clemens August Graf von Galen (who denounced Nazi euthanasia and lawlessness), offered some of the most trenchant public criticism of the Third Reich—not only against intrusions by the regime into church governance and to arrests of clergy and expropriation of church property but also to the fundamentals of human rights and justice as the foundation of a political system. Their example inspired some acts of overt resistance, such as that of the White Rose student group in Munich, and provided moral stimulus and guidance for various leading figures in the political Resistance.

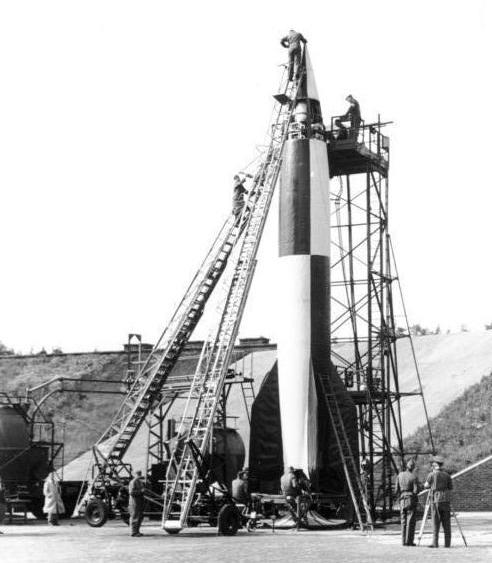
Plans and production locations for the V-2 were supplied to the Allies by Heinrich Maier's group.

In Austria there were Habsburg-motivated groups. These were the special focus of the Gestapo, because their common goal—the overthrow of the Nazi regime and the re-establishment of an independent Austria under Habsburg leadership—was a special provocation for the Nazi regime, especially because Hitler bristled with hatred of the Habsburg family. Hitler diametrically rejected the centuries-old Habsburg principles of "live and let live" with regard to ethnic groups, peoples, minorities, religions, cultures, and languages.

Because of Hitler's orders, thousands of these resistance fighters were sent directly to concentration camps without trial. From 800 to 1,000 Habsburg resistance fighters were executed. As a unique attempt in the German Reich to act aggressively against the Nazi state or the Gestapo, their plans included Karl Burian's plot to blow up the Gestapo headquarters in Vienna. The Catholic resistance group, led by Heinrich Maier, wanted to revive a Habsburg monarchy after the war and passed on plans and production sites for V-2 rockets, Tiger tanks, the Messerschmitt Bf 109, the Messerschmitt Me 163 Komet, and other aircraft to the Allies. From the fall of 1943 at least, these transmissions informed the Allies about the site plans of German production plants. The information was important to Operation Crossbow. With the location sketches of the factories, Allied bombers were given instructions on when and where to bomb. In contrast to many other German resistance groups, the Maier Group reported very early about the mass murder of Jews through their contacts with the Semperit factory near Auschwitz—a message the Americans in Zurich initially did not believe.

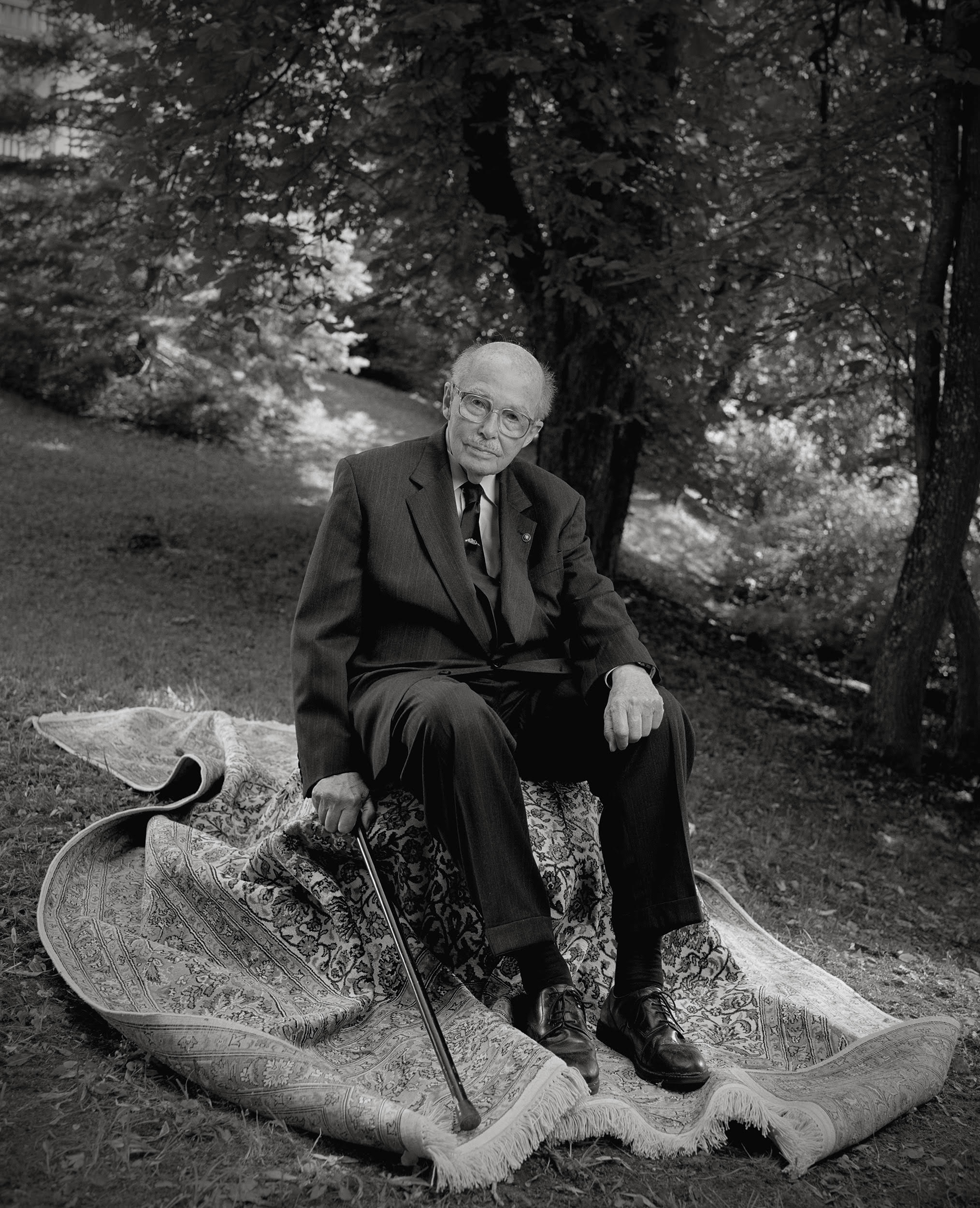
Otto von Habsburg

Even the Habsburg resistance on a small scale was followed extremely strictly. For example, in a People's Court (Volksgerichtshof) trial in Vienna, an old, seriously ill, and frail woman was sentenced to four years in prison for possessing a note she wrote found in her wallet with the rhymed text "Wir wollen einen Kaiser von Gottesgnaden und keinen Blutmörder aus Berchtesgaden." ("We want an emperor of divine grace and not a blood murderer from Berchtesgaden."). Another Habsburg supporter was sentenced to death by a Nazi court in Vienna for donating 9 Reichsmarks to "Rote Hilfe". The pro-Habsburg Schönfeld siblings were also sentenced to death for producing anti-Nazi leaflets.

Ernst Karl Winter founded in 1939 in New York the "Austrian American Center", a non-partisan national committee with a Habsburg background. This organized regular demonstrations and marches and published weekly writings. In the US there were also the "Austrian American League" chapters as pro-Habsburg organizations. Otto von Habsburg, who was on the Sonderfahndungsliste G.B. ("Special Search List Great Britain"), strongly opposed the Nazi regime. Habsburg supporters provided thousands of refugees with rescue visas and made politics for the peoples of Central Europe with the Allies. The decisive factor was the attempt to keep the peoples of Central Europe out of the communist sphere of influence and to counterbalance a dominant post-war Germany. He obtained the support of Winston Churchill for a conservative "Danube Federation", in effect a restoration of Austria-Hungary, but Joseph Stalin put an end to these plans.

Individual Germans or small groups of people acting as the "unorganized resistance" defied the Nazi regime in various ways, most notably those who helped Jews survive the Holocaust by hiding them, obtaining papers for them, or in other ways aiding them. More than 300 Germans have been recognised for this. It also included, particularly in the later years of the regime, informal networks of young Germans who evaded serving in the Hitler Youth and defied the cultural policies of the Nazis in various ways.

The German Army, the Foreign Office, and Abwehr, the military intelligence organization, became sources for plots against Hitler in 1938 and again in 1939 but could not implement their plans. After the German defeat in the Battle of Stalingrad in 1943, they contacted many army officers who were convinced that Hitler was leading Germany to disaster, although few were willing to engage in overt resistance. Active resisters in this group were frequently drawn from the Prussian aristocracy.

Almost every community in Germany had members sent to concentration camps. As early as 1935 there were alarms, "Dear Lord God, keep me quiet, so that I don't end up in Dachau". (It almost rhymes in German: Lieber Herr Gott mach mich stumm / Daß ich nicht nach Dachau komm.) "Dachau" refers to the Dachau concentration camp. This is a parody of a common German children's prayer, "Lieber Gott mach mich fromm, daß ich in den Himmel komm". ("Dear God, make me pious, so I go to Heaven.")

== Forms of resistance ==
=== Disorganized resistance ===
While it cannot be disputed that many Germans supported the regime until the end of the war, beneath the surface of German society there were also currents of resistance, if not always consciously political. The German historian Detlev Peukert, who pioneered the study of German society during the Nazi era, called this phenomenon "everyday resistance". His research was based partly on the regular reports by the Gestapo and the SD on morale and public opinion and on the "Reports on Germany" which were produced by the exiled SPD based on information from its underground network in Germany and which were acknowledged to be very well informed.

Peukert and other writers have shown that the most persistent sources of dissatisfaction in Nazi Germany were the state of the economy and anger at the corruption of Nazi Party officials—although these rarely affected the popularity of Hitler. The Nazi regime is frequently credited with "curing unemployment" but this was done mainly by conscription and rearmament—the civilian economy remained weak throughout the Nazi period. Although prices were fixed by law, wages remained low and there were acute shortages, particularly once the war started. To this after 1942 was added the acute misery caused by Allied air attacks on German cities. The high living and venality of Nazi officials such as Hermann Göring aroused increasing anger. The result was "deep dissatisfaction among the population of all parts of the country, caused by failings in the economy, government intrusions into private life, disruption of accepted tradition and custom, and police-state controls".

Otto and Elise Hampel protested against the regime by leaving postcards urging resistance (passive and forceful) against the regime around Berlin. It took two years before they were caught, convicted and then put to death.

Opposition based on this widespread dissatisfaction usually took "passive" forms—absenteeism, malingering, spreading rumours, trading on the black market, hoarding and avoiding various forms of state service such as donations to Nazi causes. Sometimes it took more active forms, such as warning people about to be arrested, hiding them, helping them to escape or turning a blind eye to oppositionist activities. Among the industrial working class, where the underground SPD and KPD networks were always active, there were frequent if short-lived strikes. These were generally tolerated, at least before the outbreak of war, provided the demands of the strikers were purely economic and not political.

Another form of resistance was assisting German Jews. By mid-1942 the deportation of German and Austrian Jews to extermination camps in occupied Poland was well under way. It is argued by some writers that the great majority of Germans were indifferent to the fate of the Jews, and a substantial proportion supported the Nazi programme of extermination. A minority persisted in trying to help Jews, even in the face of serious risk to themselves and their families. This was most pronounced in Berlin, where the Gestapo and SS were headquartered but also where thousands of non-Jewish Berliners, some with powerful connections, risked hiding their Jewish neighbors.

Aristocrats such as Maria von Maltzan and Maria Therese von Hammerstein obtained papers for Jews and helped many to escape from Germany. In Wieblingen in Baden, Elisabeth von Thadden, a private girls' school principal, disregarded official edicts and continued to enroll Jewish girls at her school until May 1941, when the school was nationalised and she was dismissed (she was executed in 1944, following the Frau Solf Tea Party). A Berlin Protestant Minister, Heinrich Grüber, organised the smuggling of Jews to the Netherlands. At the Foreign Office, Wilhelm Canaris conspired to send a number of Jews to Switzerland under various pretexts. It is estimated that 2,000 Jews were hidden in Berlin until the end of the war. Martin Gilbert has documented numerous cases of Germans and Austrians, including officials and Army officers, who saved the lives of Jews.

=== Open protests ===
Across the twentieth century public protest comprised a primary form of civilian opposition within totalitarian regimes. Potentially influential popular protests required not only public expression but the collection of a crowd of persons speaking with one voice. In addition, only protests which caused the regime to take notice and respond to are included here.

Improvised protests also occurred if rarely in Nazi Germany, and represent a form of resistance not wholly researched, Sybil Milton wrote already in 1984. Hitler and National Socialism's perceived dependence on the mass mobilization of his people, the "racial" Germans, along with the belief that Germany had lost the First World War due to an unstable home front, caused the regime to be peculiarly sensitive to public, collective protests. Hitler recognized the power of collective action, advocated non-compliance toward unworthy authority (e.g. the 1923 French occupation of the Ruhr), and brought his party to power in part by mobilizing public unrest and disorder to further discredit the Weimar Republic. In power, Nazi leaders quickly banned extra-party demonstrations, fearing displays of dissent on open urban spaces might develop and grow, even without organization.

To direct attention away from dissent, the Nazi state appeased some public, collective protests by "racial" Germans and ignored but did not repress others, both before and during the war. The regime rationalized appeasement of public protests as temporary measures to maintain the appearance of German unity and reduce the risk of alienating the public through blatant Gestapo repression. Examples of compromises for tactical reasons include social and material concessions to workers, deferment of punishing oppositional church leaders, "temporary" exemptions of intermarried Jews from the Holocaust, failure to punish hundreds of thousands of women for disregarding Hitler's 'total war' decree conscripting women into the work force, and rejection of coercion to enforce civilian evacuations from urban areas bombed by the Allies.

An early defeat of state institutions and Nazi officials by mass, popular protest culminated with Hitler's release and reinstatement to church office of Protestant bishops Hans Meiser and Theophil Wurm in October 1934. Meiser's arrest two weeks earlier had stirred mass public protests of thousands in Bavaria and Württemberg and initiated protests to the German Foreign Ministry from countries around the world. Unrest had festered between regional Protestants and the state since early 1934 and came to a boil in mid-September when the regional party daily accused Meiser of treason, and shameful betrayal of Hitler and the state. By the time Hitler intervened, pastors were increasingly involving parishioners in the church struggle. Their agitation was amplifying distrust of the state as protest was worsening and spreading rapidly. Alarm among local officials was escalating. Some six thousand gathered in support of Meiser while only a few dutifully showed up at a meeting of the region's party leader, Julius Streicher. Mass open protests, the form of agitation and bandwagon building the Nazis employed so successfully, were now working against them. When Streicher's deputy, Karl Holz, held a mass rally in Nuremberg's main square, Adolf-Hitler-Platz, the director of the city's Protestant Seminary led his students into the square, encouraging others along the way to join, where they effectively sabotaged the Nazi rally and broke out singing "A Mighty Fortress is our God." To rehabilitate Meiser and bring the standoff to a close, Hitler, who in January had publicly condemned the bishops in their presence as "traitors to the people, enemies of the Fatherland, and the destroyers of Germany," arranged a mass audience including the bishops and spoke in conciliatory tones.

This early contest points to enduring characteristics of regime responses to open, collective protests. It would prefer dealing with mass dissent immediately and decisively—not uncommonly retracting the cause of protest with local and policy-specific concessions. Open dissent, left unchecked, tended to spread and worsen. Church leaders had improvised a counter-demonstration strong enough to neutralize the party's rally just as the Nazi Party had faced down socialist and communist demonstrators while coming to power. Instructive in this case is the view of a high state official that, regardless of the protesters motives, they were political in effect; although church protests were in defense of traditions rather than an attack on the regime, they nonetheless had political consequences, the official said, with many perceiving the clergy as anti-Nazi, and a "great danger of the issue spilling over from a church affair into the political arena".

Hitler recognized that workers, through repeated strikes, might force approval of their demands and he made concessions to workers in order to preempt unrest; yet the rare but forceful public protests the regime faced were by women and Catholics, primarily. Some of the earliest work on resistance examined the Catholic record, including most spectacularly local and regional protests against decrees removing crucifixes from schools, part of the regime's effort to secularize public life. Although historians dispute the degree of political antagonism toward National Socialism behind these protests, their impact is uncontested. Popular, public, improvised protests against decrees replacing crucifixes with the Führer's picture, in incidents from 1935 to 1941, from north to south and east to west in Germany, forced state and party leaders to back away and leave crucifixes in traditional places. Prominent incidents of crucifix removal decrees, followed by protests and official retreat, occurred in Oldenburg (Lower Saxony) in 1936, Frankenholz (Saarland) and Frauenberg (East Prussia) in 1937, and in Bavaria in 1941. Women, with traditional sway over children and their spiritual welfare, played a leading part.

German history of the early twentieth century held examples of the power of public mobilization. After the Oldenburg crucifix struggle, police reported that Catholic activists told each other they could defeat future anti-Catholic actions of the state as long as they posed a united front. Catholic Bishop Clemens von Galen may well have been among them. He had raised his voice in the struggle, circulating a pastoral letter. A few months later in early 1937, while other bishops voiced fear of using such "direct confrontation," Galen favored selective "public protests" as a means of defending church traditions against an overreaching state.

Some argue that the regime, once at war, no longer heeded popular opinion and, some agencies and authorities did radicalize use of terror for domestic control in the final phase of war. Hitler and the regime's response to collective street protest, however, did not harden. Although a number of historians have argued that popular opinion, brought to a head by Galen's denunciations from the pulpit in the late summer of 1941, caused Hitler to suspend Nazi "Euthanasia," others disagree. It is certain, however, that Galen intended to have an impact from the pulpit and that the highest Nazi officials decided against punishing him out of concern for public morale. A Catholic protest in May the same year against the closing of the Münsterschwarzach monastery in Lower Franconia illustrates the regime's occasional response of not meeting protester demands while nevertheless responding with "flexibility" and "leniency" rather than repressing or punishing protesters. That protest, however, represented only local opinion rather than the nationwide anxiety Galen represented, stirred up by the Euthanasia program the regime refused to acknowledge.

Another indication that civilians realized the potential of public protest within a regime so concerned about morale and unity, is from Margarete Sommers of the Catholic Welfare Office in the Berlin Diocese. Following the Rosenstrasse Protest of early 1943. Sommers, who shared with colleagues an assumption that "the people could mobilize against the regime on behalf of specific values," wrote that the women had succeeded through "loudly voiced protests". The protest began as a smattering of "racial" German women seeking information about their Jewish husbands who had just been incarcerated in the course of the massive roundup of Berlin Jews in advance of the Nazi Party's declaration that Berlin was "free of Jews." As they continued their protest over the course of a week, a powerful feeling of solidarity developed. Police guards repeatedly scattered the women, gathered in groups of up to hundreds, with shouts of "clear the street or we'll shoot." As the police repeatedly failed to shoot, some protesters began to think their action might prevail. One said that if she had first calculated whether a protest could have succeeded, she would have stayed home. Instead, "we acted from the heart," she said, adding that the women were capable of such courageous action because their husbands were in grave danger. Some 7,000 of the last Jews in Berlin arrested at this time were sent to Auschwitz. At Rosenstrasse, however, the regime relented and released Jews with "racial" family members. Even intermarried Jews who had been sent to Auschwitz work camps were returned.

Another potential indication that German civilians realized the power of public protest was in Dortmund-Hörde in April 1943. According to an SD Report from July 8 of 1943, in the early afternoon of April 12, 1943, an army captain arrested a Flak soldier in Dortmund-Hörde because of an insolent salute. The townsfolk looking on took his side. A crowd formed of three to four hundred comprised essentially of women. The crowd shouted lines such as "Gebt uns unsere Männer wieder" ("give us our men back"), which suggested some in the crowd were aware of the protest on Rosenstrasse. The recent timing of the weeklong protest on Rosenstrasse strengthens this possibility. On Rosenstrasse, the chant had been coined as the rallying cry of wives for their incarcerated husbands.

==== The Rosenstrasse protest ====
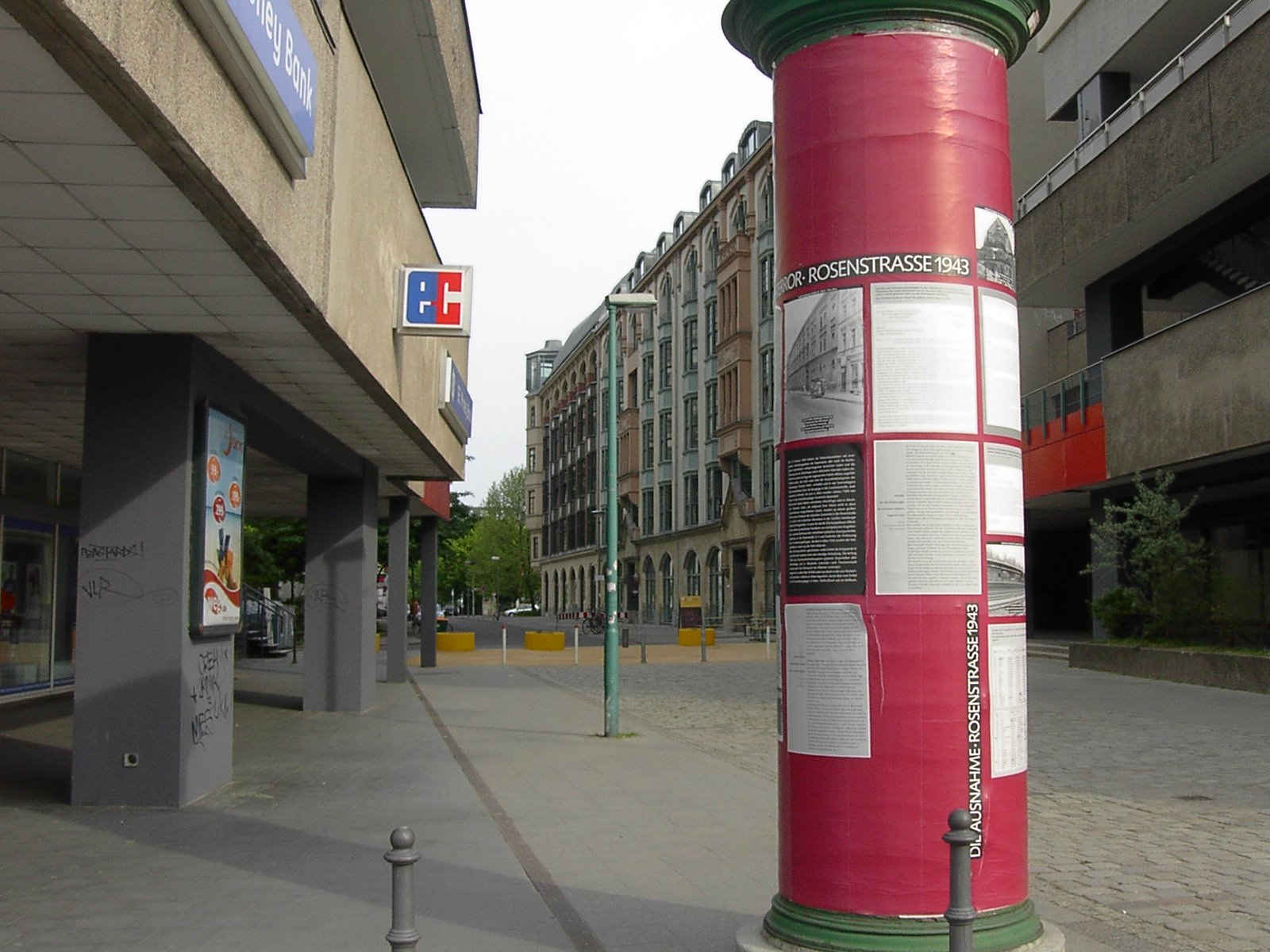
Berlin's Rosenstrasse, where the only public protest against the deportation of German Jews took place in 1943

The Rosenstrasse protest of February 1943 was the only open, collective protest for Jews during the Third Reich. It was sparked by the arrest and threatened deportation to death camps of 1,800 Jewish men married to non-Jewish women. They were "full" Jews in the sense of the 1935 Nuremberg Laws and the Gestapo aimed to deport as many as it could without drawing attention to the Holocaust or alienating the "racial" public. Before these men could be deported, their wives and other relatives rallied outside the building in Rosenstrasse where the men were held. About 6,000 people, mostly women, rallied in shifts in the winter cold for over a week. Eventually Himmler, worried about the effect on civilian morale, gave in and allowed the arrested men to be released. Some who had already been deported and were on their way to Auschwitz were brought back. There was no retaliation against the protesters, and most of the Jewish men survived.

Intermarried German Jews and their children were the only Jews to escape the fate Reich authorities had selected for them, and by the end of the war 98 percent of German Jews who survived without being deported or going into hiding were intermarried. Hitler told Goebbels in November 1941, Jews were to be deported aggressively only as long as this did not cause "unnecessary difficulties." Thus "intermarried Jews, above all those in artist circles," should be pursued somewhat reservedly. A protest during wartime showing public dissent and offering an opportunity to dissent represented an unnecessary difficulty for a Führer determined to prevent another weak home front like the one he blamed for Germany's defeat in the First World War.

==== Witten protesters ====
Even up until the end of 1944, Hitler remained concerned about his image and refused to use coercion against disobedient "racial" Germans. On October 11, 1943, some three hundred women protested on Adolf Hitler Square in the western German Ruhr Valley city of Witten against the official decision to withhold their food ration cards unless they evacuated their homes. Under increasing Allied bombardments, officials had struggled to establish an orderly program for evacuation. Yet by late 1943 many thousands of persons, including hundreds from Witten, had returned from evacuation sites. The Westfälische Landeszeitung, the daily Nazi Party regional newspaper, branded evacuees who returned as pests ("Schädlinge"), a classification for persons subverting the Reich and its war. Officials called them "wild" evacuees, exercising their own against the party and state, according to Julie Torrie.

The Witten protesters had the power of millions of likeminded Germans behind it, and venerable traditions of family life. Within four months Hitler ordered all Nazi Party Regional Leaders (Gauleiter) not to withhold the ration cards of evacuees who returned home without permission. In July 1944, Reichsführer SS Heinrich Himmler and Hitler's Private Secretary Martin Bormann jointly ruled that "coercive measures" continued to be unsuitable, and in October, 1944 Bormann reiterated that coercion was not to be used against evacuees who had returned.

"One dare not bend to the will of the people in this point," Goebbels wrote in his diary several weeks later. The shuffling back and forth of Germans between evacuation sites and their homes strained the Reichsbahn, and the regime must "dam up" the stream of returning evacuees. If "friendly cajoling" failed "then one must use force." At the moment, however, "the people know just exactly where the soft spot of the leadership is, and will always exploit this. Should we make this spot hard where we have been soft up until now, then the will of the people will bend to the will of the state. Currently we're on the best path to bending the will of the state to the will of the people." Giving in to the street is increasingly dangerous, Goebbels wrote, since each time this happens the state loses authority and in the end loses all authority.

In Berlin, leaders continued to assuage rather than draw further attention to public collective protests, as the best way to protect their authority and the propaganda claims that all Germans stood united behind the Führer. In this context, ordinary Germans were sometimes able to exact limited concessions, as Goebbels worried that a growing number of Germans were becoming aware of the regime's soft spot represented by its response to protests.

=== Assassination attempts on Hitler ===
==== Georg Elser's attempt ====
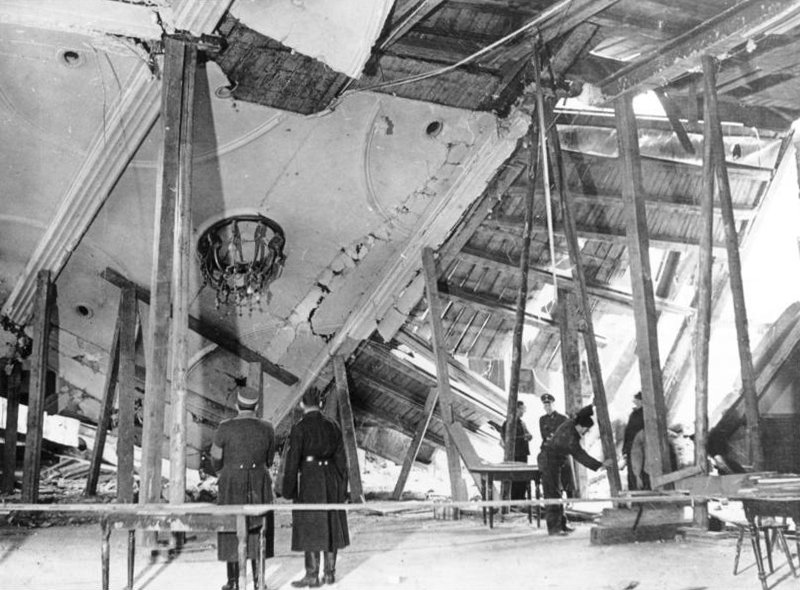
Ruins of the Bürgerbräukeller in Munich after Georg Elser's failed assassination of Hitler in November 1939

In November 1939, Georg Elser, a carpenter from Württemberg, developed a plan to assassinate Hitler completely on his own. Elser had been peripherally involved with the KPD before 1933, but his exact motives for acting as he did remain a mystery. He read in the newspapers that Hitler would be addressing a Nazi Party meeting on 8 November, in the Bürgerbräukeller, a beer hall in Munich where Hitler had launched the Beer Hall Putsch on the same date in 1923. Stealing explosives from his workplace, he built a powerful time bomb, and for over a month managed to stay inside the Bürgerbräukeller after hours each night, during which time he hollowed out the pillar behind the speaker's rostrum to place the bomb inside.

On the night of 7 November 1939, Elser set the timer and left for the Swiss border. Unexpectedly, because of the pressure of wartime business, Hitler made a much shorter speech than usual and left the hall 13 minutes before the bomb went off, killing seven people. Sixty-three people were injured, sixteen more were seriously injured with one dying later. Had Hitler still been speaking, the bomb almost certainly would have killed him.

This event set off a hunt for potential conspirators which intimidated the opposition and made further action more difficult. Elser was arrested at the border, sent to the Sachsenhausen Concentration Camp, and then in 1945 moved to the Dachau concentration camp; he was executed two weeks before the liberation of Dachau KZ.

==== Aeroplane assassination attempt ====
In late 1942, von Tresckow and Olbricht formulated a plan to assassinate Hitler and stage a coup. On 13 March 1943, returning from his easternmost headquarters FHQ Werwolf near Vinnitsa to Wolfsschanze in East Prussia, Hitler was scheduled to make a stop-over at the headquarters of Army Group Centre at Smolensk. For such an occasion, von Tresckow had prepared three options:

1. Major Georg von Boeselager, in command of a cavalry honor guard, could intercept Hitler in a forest and overwhelm the SS bodyguard and the Führer in a fair fight; this course was rejected because of the prospect of a large number of German soldiers fighting each other, and a possible failure regarding the unexpected strength of the escort.
2. A joint assassination could be carried out during dinner; this idea was abandoned as supporting officers abhorred the idea of shooting the unarmed Führer.
3. A bomb could be smuggled on Hitler's plane.

Von Tresckow asked Lieutenant Colonel Heinz Brandt, on Hitler's staff and usually on the same plane that carried Hitler, to take a parcel with him, supposedly the prize of a bet won by Tresckow's friend General Stieff. It concealed a bomb, disguised in a box for two bottles of Cointreau. Von Tresckow's aide, Lieutenant Fabian von Schlabrendorff, set the fuse and handed over the parcel to Brandt who boarded the same plane as Hitler.

Hitler's Focke-Wulf Fw 200 Condor was expected to explode about 30 minutes later near Minsk, close enough to the front to be attributed to Soviet fighters. Olbricht was to use the resulting crisis to mobilise his Reserve Army network to seize power in Berlin, Vienna, Munich and in the German Wehrkreis centres. It was an ambitious but credible plan, and might have worked if Hitler had indeed been killed, although persuading Army units to fight and overcome what could certainly have been fierce resistance from the SS could have been a major obstacle.

However, as with Elser's bomb in 1939 and all other attempts, luck favoured Hitler again, which was attributed to "Vorsehung" (providence). The British-made chemical pencil detonator on the bomb had been tested many times and was considered reliable. It went off, but the bomb did not. The percussion cap apparently became too cold as the parcel was carried in the unheated cargo hold.

Displaying great sangfroid, Schlabrendorff took the next plane to retrieve the package from Colonel Brandt before the content was discovered. The blocks of plastic explosives were later used by Gersdorff and Stauffenberg.

==== Suicide bombing attempts ====
A second attempt was made a few days later on 21 March 1943, when Hitler visited an exhibition of captured Soviet weaponry in Berlin's Zeughaus. One of Tresckow's friends, Colonel Rudolf Christoph Freiherr von Gersdorff, was scheduled to explain some exhibits, and volunteered to carry out a suicide bombing using the same bomb that had failed to go off on the plane, concealed on his person. However, the only new chemical fuse he could obtain was a ten-minute one. Hitler again left prematurely after hurrying through the exhibition much quicker than the scheduled 30 minutes. Gersdorff had to dash to a bathroom to defuse the bomb to save his life, and more importantly, prevent any suspicion. This second failure temporarily demoralised the plotters at Army Group Centre. Gersdorff reported about the attempt after the war; the footage is often seen on German TV documentaries ("Die Nacht des Widerstands" etc.), including a photo showing Gersdorff and Hitler.

Axel von dem Bussche, member of the elite Infantry Regiment 9, volunteered to kill Hitler with hand grenades in November 1943 during a presentation of new winter uniforms, but the train containing them was destroyed by Allied bombs in Berlin, and the event had to be postponed. A second presentation scheduled for December at the Wolfsschanze was canceled on short notice as Hitler decided to travel to Berchtesgaden.

In January 1944, Bussche volunteered for another assassination attempt, but then he lost a leg in Russia. On February 11, another young officer, Ewald-Heinrich von Kleist tried to assassinate Hitler in the same way von dem Bussche had planned. However Hitler again canceled the event which would have allowed Kleist to approach him.

On 11 March 1944, Eberhard von Breitenbuch volunteered for an assassination attempt at the Berghof using a 7.65 mm Browning pistol concealed in his trouser pocket. He was not able to carry out the plan because guards would not allow him into the conference room with the Führer.

The next occasion was a weapons exhibition on July 7 at Schloss Klessheim near Salzburg, but Helmuth Stieff did not trigger the bomb.

==== 20 July Plot ====
Two variants of Josef Wirmer's 1944 "Resistance" design, created by his brother, Ernst. The top flag was proposed by conservative parties as a flag for West Germany (1948).

By mid-1943 the tide of war was turning decisively against Germany. The last major German offensive on the Eastern Front, Operation Citadel, ended in the defeat for the Germans at Kursk, and in July 1943 Mussolini was overthrown. The Army and civilian plotters became more convinced than ever that Hitler must be assassinated so that a government acceptable to the western Allies could be formed and a separate peace negotiated in time to prevent a Soviet invasion of Germany. This scenario, while more credible than some of the resistance's earlier plans, was based on a false premise: that the Western Allies would be willing to break with Stalin and negotiate a separate peace with a non-Nazi German government. In fact both Churchill and Roosevelt were committed to the "unconditional surrender" formula.

Since the Foreign Office was a stronghold of resistance activists, it was not difficult for the conspirators to reach the Allies via diplomats in neutral countries. However, various overtures were rejected, and indeed they were usually simply ignored. There were several reasons for this. First, the Allies did not know or trust the resisters, who seemed to them to be a clique of Prussian reactionaries concerned mainly with saving their skins now that Germany was losing the war. Second, Roosevelt and Churchill were both acutely aware that the Soviet Union was bearing the brunt of the war against Hitler, and were aware of Stalin's constant suspicions that they were doing deals behind his back. They thus refused any discussions that might be seen as suggesting a willingness to reach a separate peace with Germany. Third, the Allies were determined that in World War II, unlike in World War I, Germany must be comprehensively defeated in the field so that another "stab in the back" myth would not be able to arise in Germany.

Operation Valkyrie was intended to be used if the disruption caused by the Allied bombing of German cities caused a breakdown in law and order or a rise by the millions of slave laborers from occupied countries now being used in German factories. Friedrich Olbricht suggested that it could be subverted to mobilize the Reserve Army to stage a coup. Operation Valkyrie could only be put into effect by General Friedrich Fromm, commander of the Reserve Army, so he had to be won over to the conspiracy or in some way neutralized if the plan was to succeed. Fromm, like many senior officers, knew about the military conspiracies against Hitler but neither supported them nor reported them to the Gestapo.

During late 1943 and early 1944, there were a series of attempts to get one of the military conspirators near enough to Hitler for long enough to kill him with a bomb or a revolver. But the task was becoming increasingly difficult. As the war situation deteriorated, Hitler no longer appeared in public and rarely visited Berlin. He spent most of his time at his headquarters in East Prussia, with occasional breaks at his Bavarian mountain retreat in Berchtesgaden. In both places he was heavily guarded and rarely saw people he did not already know and trust. Himmler and the Gestapo were increasingly suspicious of plots against Hitler.

On 4 July 1944, Julius Leber, who was trying to establish contact between his own underground SPD network and the KPD's network in the interests of the "united front," was arrested after attending a meeting which had been infiltrated by the Gestapo. There was a sense that time was running out, both on the battlefield, where the eastern front was in full retreat and where the Allies had landed in France on 6 June, and in Germany, where the resistance's room for manoeuvre was rapidly contracting. Few now believed that the Allies would agree to a separate peace with a non-Nazi government, even if Hitler was assassinated. Leber in particular had argued that "unconditional surrender" was inevitable and the only question was whether it would be before or after the Soviets invaded Germany.

Nevertheless, organised resistance began to stir during 1944. While the SPD and KPD trade unions had been destroyed in 1933, the Catholic unions had voluntarily dissolved along with the Centre Party. As a result, Catholic unionists had been less zealously repressed than their socialist counterparts, and had maintained an informal network of activists. Their leaders, Jakob Kaiser and Max Habermann, judged by the beginning of 1944 that it was time to take action. They organised a network of resistance cells in government offices across Germany, ready to rise and take control of their buildings when the word was given by the military that Hitler was dead.

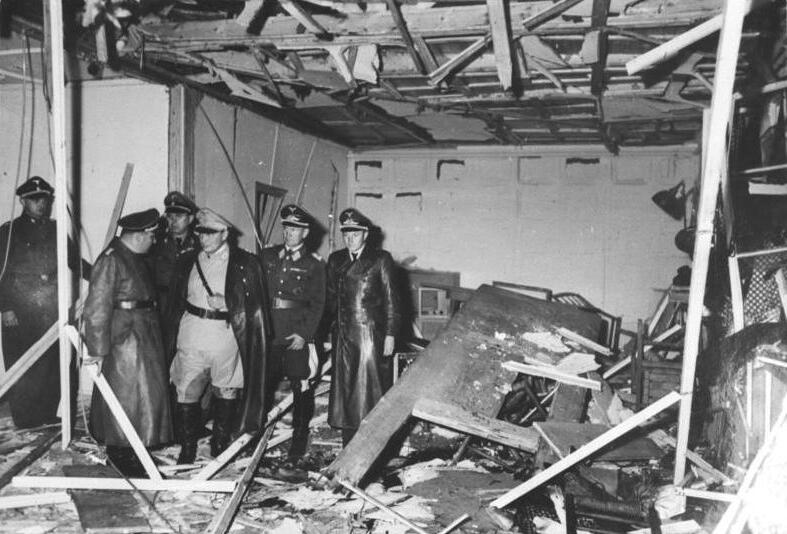
Reichsminister Hermann Göring surveys the destroyed conference room at the Wolfsschanze, July 1944.

On 1 July Claus von Stauffenberg was appointed chief-of-staff to General Fromm at the Reserve Army headquarters on Bendlerstrasse in central Berlin. This position enabled Stauffenberg to attend Hitler's military conferences, either in East Prussia or at Berchtesgaden. Twice in early July Stauffenberg attended Hitler's conferences carrying a bomb in his briefcase. But because the conspirators had decided that Himmler, too, must be assassinated if the planned mobilisation of Operation Valkyrie was to have any chance of success, he had held back at the last minute because Himmler was not present—in fact it was unusual for Himmler to attend military conferences. By 15 July, when Stauffenberg again flew to East Prussia, this condition had been dropped. The plan was for Stauffenberg to plant the briefcase with the bomb in Hitler's conference room with a timer running, excuse himself from the meeting, wait for the explosion, then fly back to Berlin and join the other plotters at the Bendlerblock. Operation Valkyrie would be mobilised, the Reserve Army would take control of Germany and the other Nazi leaders would be arrested. Beck would be appointed head of state, Goerdeler Chancellor and Witzleben commander-in-chief. The plan was ambitious and depended on a run of very good luck, but it was not totally fanciful.

===== Rastenburg =====
Again on 15 July the attempt was called off at the last minute. On 18 July rumours reached Stauffenberg that the Gestapo had wind of the conspiracy and that he might be arrested at any time—this was apparently not true, but there was a sense that the net was closing in and that the next opportunity to kill Hitler must be taken because there might not be another. On 20 July Stauffenberg flew back to the Wolfsschanze for another Hitler military conference, again with a bomb in his briefcase. Stauffenberg, having previously activated the timer on the bomb, placed his briefcase under the table around which Hitler and more than 20 officers were seated or standing. After ten minutes, he made an excuse and left the room.

At 12:40 the bomb went off, demolishing the conference room. Several officers were killed, but Hitler was only wounded. He had likely been saved because the heavy oak leg of the conference table, behind which Stauffenberg's briefcase had been left, deflected the blast. But Stauffenberg, seeing the building collapse in smoke and flame, assumed Hitler was dead, and immediately got on a plane to Berlin. Before he arrived, General Erich Fellgiebel, an officer at Rastenburg who was in on the plot, had rung the Bendlerblock and told the plotters that Hitler had survived the explosion. When Stauffenberg phoned from the airport to say Hitler was dead, the Bendlerblock plotters did not know whom to believe. In the confusion, Olbricht did not issue the orders for Operation Valkyrie to be mobilised until 16:00.

By 16:40 Himmler had already taken charge of the situation and issued orders countermanding Olbricht's mobilisation of Operation Valkyrie. However, in many places the coup continued to go ahead, led by officers who believed that Hitler was dead. The Propaganda Ministry on the Wilhelmstrasse, with Joseph Goebbels inside, was surrounded by troops. In Paris, Stülpnagel issued orders for the arrest of the SS and SD commanders. In Vienna, Prague and many other places troops occupied Nazi Party offices and arrested Gauleiters and SS officers.

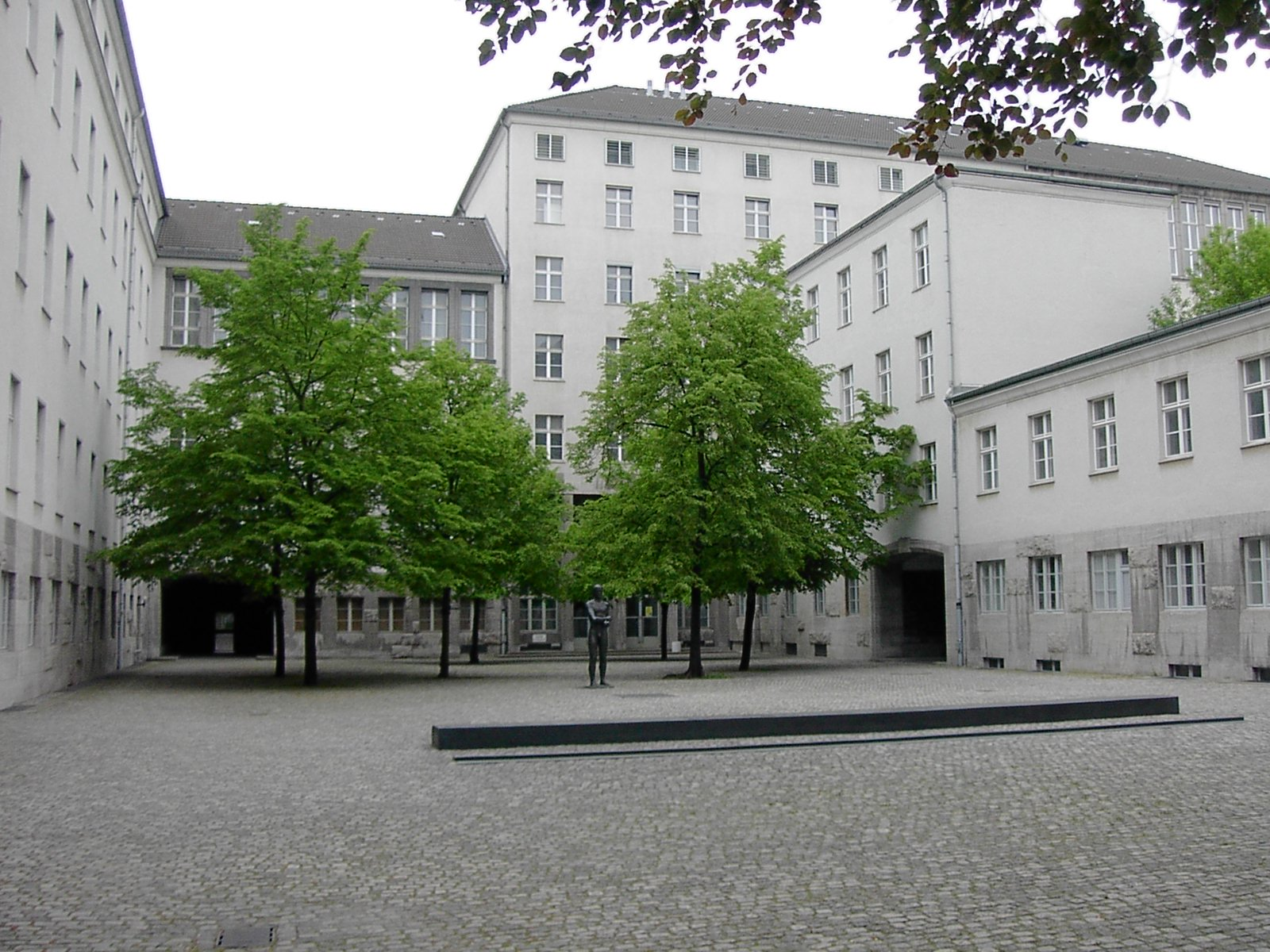
The courtyard at the Bendlerblock, where Stauffenberg, Olbricht and others were executed

The decisive moment came at 19:00, when Hitler was sufficiently recovered to make phone calls. By phone, he personally empowered a loyal officer, Major Otto Remer, to regain control of the situation in Berlin. Less resolute members of the conspiracy began to change sides. Fromm declared that he had convened a court-martial consisting of himself, and had sentenced Olbricht, Stauffenberg and two other officers to death. However, when he went to see Goebbels to claim credit for suppressing the coup, he was immediately arrested.

Over the next weeks Himmler's Gestapo rounded up nearly everyone who had had the remotest connection with the July 20 plot. The discovery of letters and diaries in the homes and offices of those arrested revealed the plots of 1938, 1939 and 1943, and this led to further rounds of arrests. Under Himmler's new Sippenhaft (blood guilt) laws, all the relatives of the principal plotters were also arrested. Very few of the plotters tried to escape, or to deny their guilt when arrested.

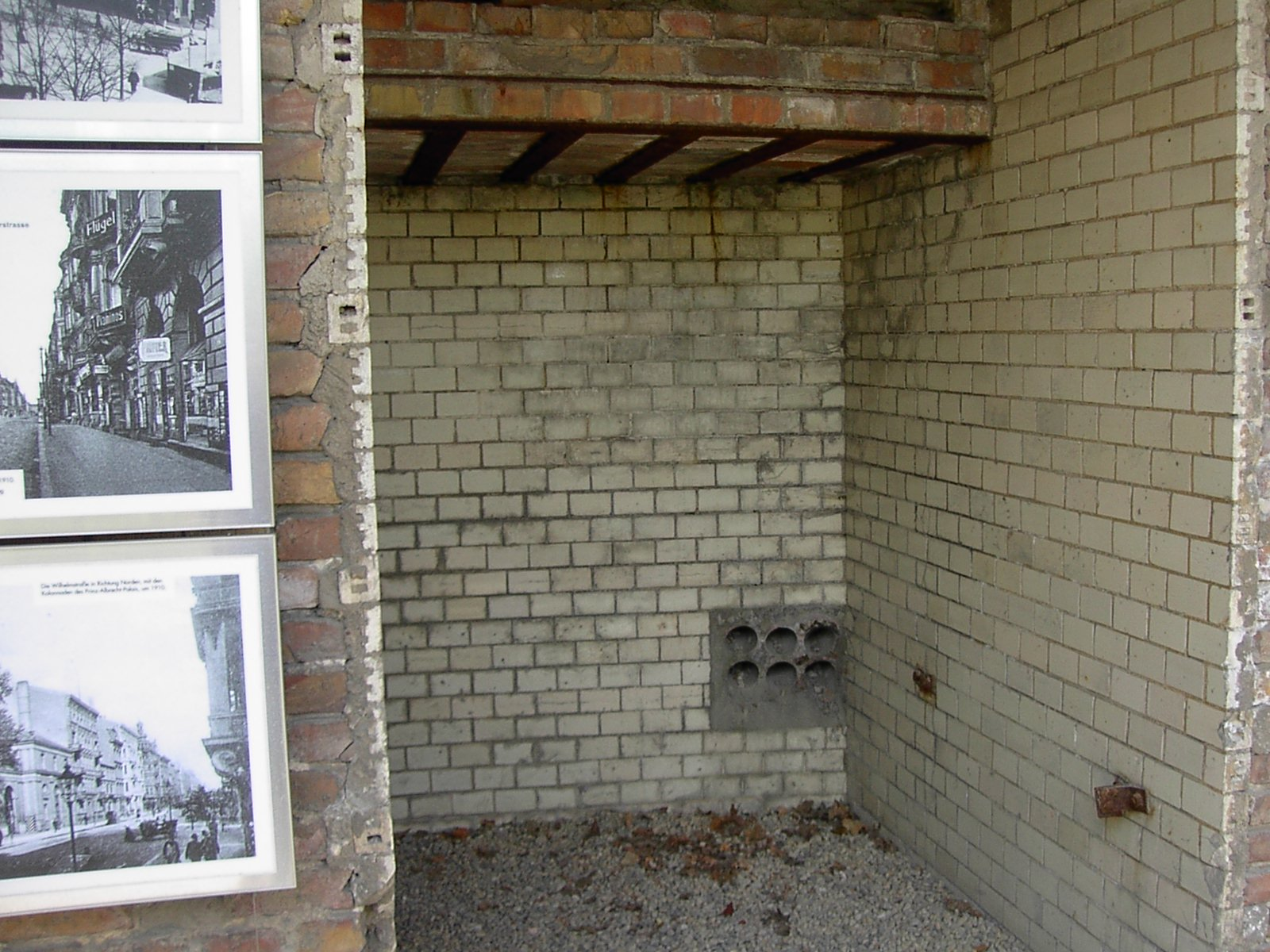
The cells of the Gestapo headquarters in Prinz-Albrecht-Strasse, where many of the July 20 plotters and other resistance activists were tortured

Those who survived interrogation were given perfunctory trials before the People's Court and its judge Roland Freisler. Eventually some 5,000 people were arrested and about 200 were executed—not all of them connected with the July 20 plot, since the Gestapo used the occasion to settle scores with many other people suspected of opposition sympathies. After February 3, 1945, when Freisler was killed in an American air raid, there were no more formal trials, but as late as April, with the war weeks away from its end, Canaris's diary was found, and many more people were implicated. Executions continued down to the last days of the war.

=== Defectors and deserters from the Wehrmacht and SS ===
==== Unorganized desertion and defection ====
Hundreds of thousands of German soldiers deserted from the Wehrmacht, some defected to Allied armed forces and anti-Fascist partisan groups in the countries occupied by the Third Reich. Some deserters remained in Germany, like the partisan band in the Harz Mountains. In 1944, approximately two hundred thousand cases of desertion were counted. However, unlike the cases of refusal to join the army by the religious groups or to shoot civilians by the SS, desertion was often spontaneous and dictated by the situation and not a conscious decision and did not necessarily indicate a rejection of the goals of the Nazi war policy; these desertions and defections did not extend to collective mutiny. Many of the defectors to the Allies and anti-Fascist partisans were serving in parole units of the German Army which were often formed of politically persecuted people. Of the approximately 28 000 "soldiers unfit for military service" of the unit 999 one third were victims of political repression, and although attempts to defect and desertions were punished with death sentences, many of the serving in the Division 999 defected to Greek partisans. In 15 December 1944, over 300 political prisoner from the 2nd and 3rd battalion of the SS-Sturmregiment / 2.SS-Sturmbrigade Dirlewanger defected to the Soviet 6th Guards Tank Army en masse.

A few hundred German soldiers willingly went over to the Soviet side, but they were not trusted and were generally confined to the rear. An exception was Corporal Fritz Schmenkel, a Communist who had regularly gone AWOL and often served time in a military jail for after being forcibly conscripted to the Wehrmacht in 1938. While serving in Belarus in November 1941, Schmenkel deserted and joined the Soviet partisans; in 1943, he was captured by the Nazis and executed in 1944.

==== Creation of the NKFD ====
The black-white-red flag was used by the National Committee for a Free Germany.

General Walther von Seydlitz-Kurzbach was perhaps the best-known German defector to the Soviet Union. He thoroughly disagreed with Hitler's order not to break out from Stalingrad and so led some of his officers out of the encirclement and surrendered to the Soviets. After being captured, he headed the League of German Officers (German: Bund Deutscher Offiziere, BDO), a sub-organisation of the National Committee for a Free Germany (German: Nationalkomitee Freies Deutschland, NKFD) formed mostly of the German prisoners of war in the Soviet Union and the exiled KPD members among its leadership, including Wilhelm Pieck and Walter Ulbricht; Seydlitz became one of the key members of the NKFD.

The NKFD declared the overthrow of Hitler by the German people and a return to the borders of 1937 to be its main goals. Initially its main activities were political reeducation and indoctrination and propaganda and psychological warfare aimed at the Wehrmacht, and Seydlitz participated only in this side of the NKFD while disassociating himself from the armed struggle also conducted by the organisation, being the author and a spokesperson of pro-Soviet radio broadcasts and a parlimentaire while negotiating surrenders of the Germans. The biggest action Seydlitz had participated in as the leader of the NKFD was his involvement in the Battle of Korsun–Cherkassy, as Seydlitz and the other leaders of the NKFD urged the Germans to surrender and as Seydlitz established personal communications with German commanders of the operation to urge them to do so. The members of the NKFD were sent to the battlefield where they spread NKFD leaflets which served as safe conduct passes into captivity showing that the surrender is voluntary and that the soldiers with such leaflets should be handed over to the NKFD. The operation was relatively successful, and out of the 18 200 captured Germans each third produced an NKFD leaflet. Seydlitz also proposed the creation of a pro-Soviet German army in German uniform, an analogue of the Vlasov army, but Stalin rejected this idea; in contrast, Stalin formed two Red Army divisions of Romanian prisoners of war after their request.

==== Combat Units and guerrillas of the NKFD ====
The other side was armed struggle, which, however, was not openly proclaimed when the organisation was formed. The NKFD had been forming small armed Combat Units, Kampfgruppen since Summer 1943, and the first such unit was parachuted North-East of Pskov on 8 December 1943. Although these units were equipped with weapons, armed struggle was not their main purpose, and they were supposed to avoid any combat if possible: they were supposed to land in Wehrmacht rear areas and spread propaganda of their parent organisation and create NKFD groups within the rearguard Wehrmacht units which would surrender to the Soviets at the front. Kampfgruppen constituted both of German and Soviet soldiers, but eventually they would be composed solely of Germans and participate in combat against the Wehrmacht towards the end of the war. After the first Kampfgruppe successfully landed, the Red Army requested them to carry out intelligence missions. As the captured German officers failed to justify their roles as Soviet "mouthpieces", the influence in the organisation had been flowing to the KPD leaders, and in January 1944, they announced the "second phase" of the movement. The main goal of the KPD was a creation of a popular partisan movement which would at least launch a full-scale guerrilla warfare in Germany if not mass anti-Nazi uprisings or even overthrow Hitler. Throughout 1944, Kampfgruppen and Freischärlergruppen (Partisan Units), along with carrying out tasks at the Soviet territories occupied by the Third Reich, were sent to East Prussia where they were expected to create such movement. However, East Prussia turned out to be an extremely conservative and nationalist region, and the locals aided the authorities immeasurably with repressions against the NKFD partisans, so even if the idea of creating a partisan movement in Germany was not doomed from the start, the choice of the region determined its failure. After numerous attempts, Ulbricht admitted the defeat only in March 1945. The failure of the attempt to create a popular anti-Fascist movement in Germany led to a moral decline and "crisis" within the NKFD.

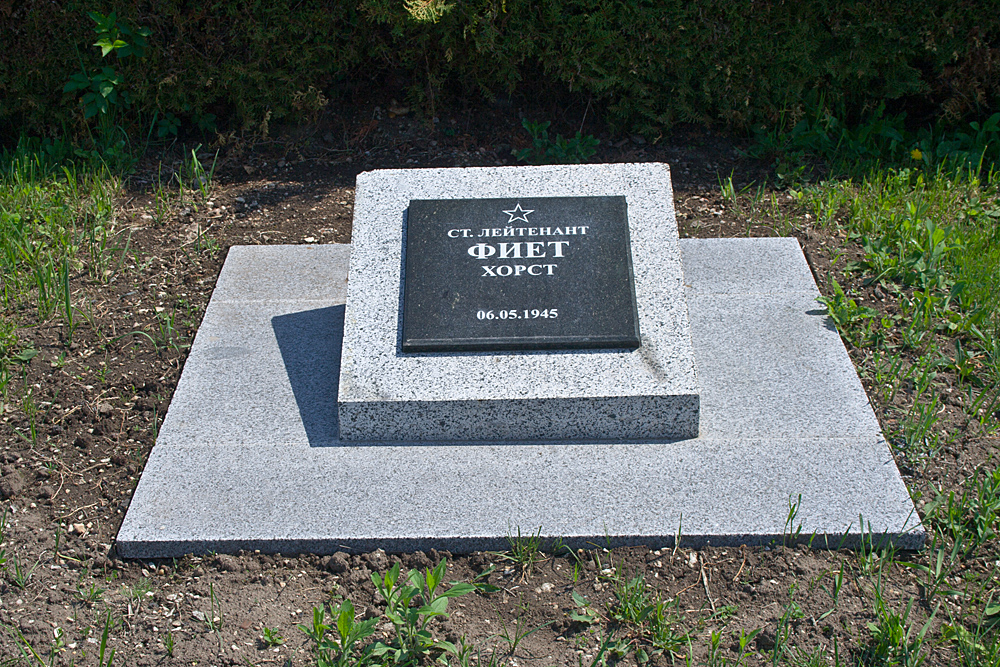
Grave of Lt. Horst Vieth killed in combat with Wehrmacht during the siege of Breslau

Although the attempt to create a partisan movement had failed, an independent NKFD group emerged in Cologne and was involved in some of the underground activity in over the fall and winter of 1944–1945. A few hundred German POWs in the United States and Britain, some of whom had joined the Freies Deutschland movement, helped the Western Allies organize several guerrilla and counter-guerrilla bands trained for parachute deployment in the Alps. One such operation, codenamed "Homespun," was broken up by the Sicherheitspolizei in April 1945. Apparently, Western and Southern Germany were more suitable for partisan activities than East Prussia.

Despite the "crisis", the NKFD continued operating and the volunteers kept joining the Kampfgruppen. As the Red Army stepped on German soil, the significance of the NKFD as a means to demonstrate the support of its invasion among the Germans had grown; the failure of the guerrilla warfare determined the Soviet leadership, and the Kampfgruppen became used for such activities as commando assault since these had a practical use for the Red Army as a means to harass and divert the Wehrmacht and did not require popular support at the same time, and Hitler warned about the danger of the NKFD commandos in his final address to the Ostheer on 15 April 1945. Neither the KPD nor the BDO were enthusiastic about such forms of combat, but both groups had lost their influence on the Soviet leadership by Spring 1945.

The first involvement Kampfgruppen in actions against the Wehrmacht was on 21 December 1943: as usual, it was given a task to reach a Wehrmacht rear area and spread propaganda, but failed to cross the frontline, so it joined a Soviet partisan unit and its assault on a German convoy of 25 trucks, guarded by tanks and armoured vehicles; partisans and the NKFD unit successfully destroyed 4 of the trucks and neutralized 72 soldiers; a similar situation happened in June 1944, when an NKFD unit after failing to complete propaganda tasks became attached to the 90th Rifle Division of the Red Army and conducted propaganda and reconnaissance activities, disrupted Wehrmacht communication lines, blew up bridges and captured German soldiers until December. After that, such tasks were given to the Combat Units directly when sending them. Although the NKFD leadership was obviously aware of the Kampfgruppen and although Seydlitz bid farewell to the first Kampfgruppe, they, apparently, were subordinate to the Red Army and the Central Staff for Partisan Warfare (the latter was dissolved in 1944), not to the leadership of the NKFD. During the last months of the war, the activities of the Kampfgruppen increased, and they were thrown into combat at the front; in Winter 1945, the NKFD volunteers which were allowed to form small commandos were given permission to form separate companies (no more than 100 men in each). There are clear evidences of the NKFD units participating in combat against the Wehrmacht in the Battle of Königsberg, siege of Breslau and in the Courland Pocket, as well as in the rather minor battles for Thorn and Graudenz and the siege of Danzig. Combat was still not the main purpose of the Kampfgruppen: they pretended to be scattered Wehrmacht soldiers and attempted to enter behind the German lines, and if the latter was successful, they persuaded the troops besieged by the Red Army to surrender, and if the latter refused, they participated in combat and withdrew. The combat in Breslau is one of the best known cases of the Kampfgruppen participating at the front, although not a successful one: the group successfully overpowered the guard posts and liquidated the SS commanders, but failed to capture the Wehrmacht soldiers, and the leader of the group, Horst Vieth, was killed on 5 May.

==== "Seydlitz Troops" ====
The name "Seydlitz Troops" was based on a myth circulated among the Germans that Seydlitz had his own military formation, an analogue of the Russian Liberation Army which fought on the side of the Nazis, but it became adopted by the German High Command to the alleged members of the NKFD, especially to the ones who appeared at the front. Mainly this name was used to the "traitor officers" who appeared at the front and misled the army by issuing or orally giving false orders: for example, Reich's Chancellery warned of the "Seydlitz Troops" in a circular, and Hermann Fegelein wrote to Himmler that he "came to the conclusion that a significant part of the difficulties on the Eastern Front, including the collapse and elements of insubordination in a number of divisions, stem from the cunning sending to us of officers from the Seydlitz Troops and soldiers from among the prisoners of war who had been brainwashed by communists". In response, Oberkommando des Heeres issued an order to Army Group Vistula that they take strong measures against any unknown or unauthorized German soldiers, officers or generals found in their area of operations, and the families of the members of the NKFD became subject to Sippenhaft; Friedrich Hossbach was dismissed from command over the 4th Army as Hitler accused him of being complicit with "Seydlitz officers" due to withdrawal of his troops from the East Prussia. The fear of an actual army composed of the Wehrmacht POWs that would create a German communist state became widespread in Germany, and Hitler devised a plan of creating a conflict between the West and the USSR by making the Western Allies believe in the existence of such army.

There are several testimonies by the Germans who participated in the war that at the end of the war they met "Seydlitz Troops", and although usually they described suspicious officers who gave false orders, such Western historians as Stephan Hamilton and Tony Le Tissier also cite descriptions of the Germans in Wehrmacht uniform directly fighting at the front alongside the Red Army, some of these mention the Freies Deutschland insignia. There is no known "official documentary evidence" that would prove the German volunteers fighting alongside the Red Army during the Berlin offensive, but Le Tissier believes that these testimonies are enough to admit "that so-called Seydlitz-Troops were used in combat by the Soviets during the Berlin Operation" and the documentary evidence is "yet to be found".

==== Freies Deutschland outside Germany and the USSR ====
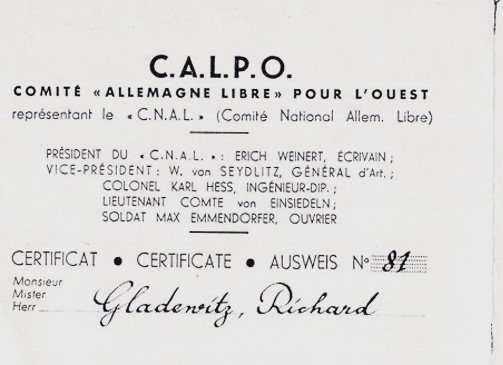
ID-card of a member of the Committee "Free Germany" for the West; on the card, the organisation is called the "representative" of the NKFD in German-occupied France

The NKFD was a part of a broader Movement for a Free Germany. Although this movement began before the creation of the NKFD, the latter profoundly affected the movement. Since 1943, participants of the movement, deserters from the Wehrmacht and German defectors, had been creating organisations modeled after the NKFD, the names of which also included the words "Committee" and "Free Germany". The best-known organisations of the movement were Anti-Fascist Committee for a Free Germany, organised by the defectors to Greek partisans, and Committee "Free Germany" for the West, which called itself the "representative" of the NKFD in German-occupied France.

== Timeline ==
=== Pre-war resistance: 1933–1939 ===
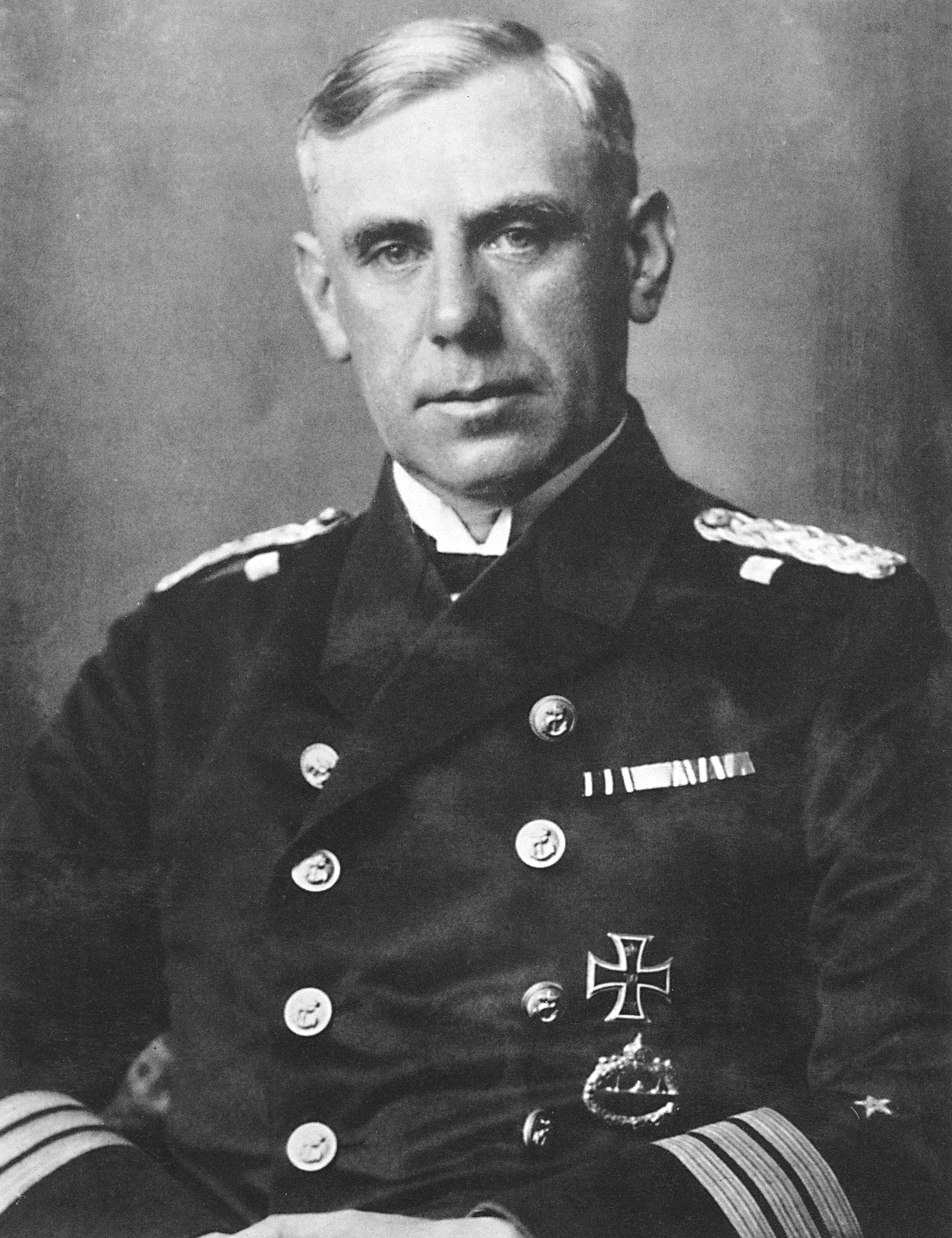
Wilhelm Canaris

There was almost no organized resistance to Hitler's regime in the period between his appointment as chancellor on January 30, 1933, and the crisis over Czechoslovakia in early October 1938. By July 1933, all other political parties and the trade unions had been suppressed, the press and radio brought under state control, and most elements of civil society neutralised. The July 1933 Concordat between Germany and the Holy See ended any possibility of systematic resistance by the Catholic Church. The largest Protestant church, the German Evangelical Church, was generally pro-Nazi, although a few church members resisted this position. The breaking of the power of the SA in the "Night of the Long Knives" in July 1934 ended any possibility of a challenge from the "socialist" wing of the Nazi Party and also brought the army into closer alliance with the regime.

Hitler's regime was overwhelmingly popular with the German people during this period. The failures of the Weimar Republic had discredited democracy in the eyes of most Germans. Hitler's apparent success in restoring full employment after the ravages of the Great Depression (achieved mainly through the reintroduction of conscription, a policy advocating that women stay home and raise children, a crash re-armament programme, and the incremental removal of Jews from the workforce as their jobs were tendered to Gentiles), and his bloodless foreign policy successes such as the reoccupation of the Rhineland in 1936 and the annexation of Austria in 1938, brought him almost universal acclaim.

During this period, the SPD and the KPD managed to maintain underground networks, although the legacy of pre-1933 conflicts between the two parties meant that they were unable to co-operate. The Gestapo frequently infiltrated these networks, and the rate of arrests and executions of SPD and KPD activists was high, but the networks continued to be able to recruit new members from the industrial working class, who resented the stringent labour discipline imposed by the regime during its race to rearm. The exiled SPD leadership in Prague received and published accurate reports of events inside Germany. But beyond maintaining their existence and fomenting industrial unrest, sometimes resulting in short-lived strikes, these networks were able to achieve little.

There remained, however, a substantial base for opposition to Hitler's regime. Although the Nazi Party had taken control of the German state, it had not destroyed and rebuilt the state apparatus in the way the Bolshevik regime had done in the Soviet Union. Institutions such as the Foreign Office, the intelligence services and, above all, the army, retained some measure of independence, while outwardly submitting to the new regime. In May 1934, Colonel-General Ludwig Beck, Chief of Staff of the Army, had offered to resign if preparations were made for an offensive war against Czechoslovakia. The independence of the army was eroded in 1938, when both the War Minister, General Werner von Blomberg, and the Army Chief, General Werner von Fritsch, were removed from office, but an informal network of officers critical of the Nazi regime remained.

In 1936, thanks to an informer, the Gestapo raids devastated Anarcho-syndicalist groups all over Germany, resulting in the arrest of 89 people. Most ended up either imprisoned or murdered by the regime. The groups had been encouraging strikes, printing and distributing anti-Nazi propaganda and recruiting people to fight the Nazis' fascist allies during the Spanish Civil War.

As part of the agreement with the conservative forces by which Hitler became chancellor in 1933, the non-party conservative Konstantin von Neurath remained foreign minister, a position he retained until 1938. During Neurath's time in control, the Foreign Office with its network of diplomats and access to intelligence, became home to a circle of resistance, under the discreet patronage of the Under-Secretary of State Ernst von Weizsäcker. Prominent in this circle were the ambassador in Rome Ulrich von Hassell, the Ambassador in Moscow Friedrich Graf von der Schulenburg, and officials Adam von Trott zu Solz, Erich Kordt and Hans Bernd von Haeften. This circle survived even when the ardent Nazi Joachim von Ribbentrop succeeded Neurath as foreign minister.

The most important centre of opposition to the regime within the state apparatus was in the intelligence services, whose clandestine operations offered an excellent cover for political organisation. The key figure here was Colonel Hans Oster, head of the Military Intelligence Office from 1938, and an anti-Nazi from as early as 1934. He was protected by the Abwehr chief Admiral Wilhelm Canaris. Oster organized an extensive clandestine network of potential resisters in the army and the intelligence services. He found an early ally in Hans Bernd Gisevius, a senior official in the Interior Ministry. Hjalmar Schacht, the governor of the Reichsbank, was also in touch with this opposition.

The problem these groups faced, however, was what form resistance to Hitler could take in the face of the regime's successive triumphs. They recognised that it was impossible to stage any kind of open political resistance. This was not, as is sometimes stated, because the repressive apparatus of the regime was so all-pervasive that public protest was impossible—as was shown when Catholics protested against the removal of crucifixes from Oldenburg schools in 1936, and the regime backed down. Rather it was because of Hitler's massive support among the German people. While resistance movements in the occupied countries could mobilise patriotic sentiment against the German occupiers, in Germany the resistance risked being seen as unpatriotic, particularly in wartime. Even many army officers and officials who detested Hitler had a deep aversion to being involved in "subversive" or "treasonous" acts against the government.

As early as 1936, Oster and Gisevius came to the view that a regime so totally dominated by one man could only be brought down by eliminating that man—either by assassinating Hitler or by staging an army coup against him. However, it was a long time before any significant number of Germans came to accept this view. Many clung to the belief that Hitler could be persuaded to moderate his regime, or that some other more moderate figure could replace him. Others argued that Hitler was not to blame for the regime's excesses, and that the removal of Heinrich Himmler and reduction in the power of the SS was needed. Some oppositionists were devout Christians who disapproved of assassination as a matter of principle. Others, particularly the army officers, felt bound by the personal oath of loyalty they had taken to Hitler in 1934.

The opposition was also hampered by a lack of agreement about their objectives other than the need to remove Hitler from power. Some oppositionists were liberals who opposed the ideology of the Nazi regime in its entirety, and who wished to restore a system of parliamentary democracy. Most of the army officers and many of the civil servants, however, were conservatives and nationalists, and many had initially supported Hitler's policies—Carl Goerdeler, the Lord Mayor of Leipzig, was a good example. Some favored restoring the Hohenzollern dynasty, while others favored an authoritarian, but not Nazi, regime. Some opposed his apparent reckless determination to take Germany into a new world war. Because of their many differences, the opposition was unable to form a united movement, or to send a coherent message to potential allies outside Germany.

=== Nadir of Resistance: 1940–1942 ===
In February 1940, Ulrich von Hassell met with James Lonsdale-Bryans to discuss plans to "stop this mad war". The peace terms that Hassell unveiled stated that Germany would keep the Sudetenland and Austria while "the German-Polish frontier will have to be more or less identical with the German frontier of 1914". Though Britain in 1940 was prepared to cede the first two demands, the demand that Poland was to surrender land to Germany as part of a peace terms proved to be a problem.

The national-conservatives were strongly opposed to the Treaty of Versailles and tended to support the aims of Nazi foreign policy, at least when it came to challenging Versailles. In their plans for a post-Nazi Germany, the conservatives took it for granted that Germany would keep the Sudetenland, Austria, the Memelland, and all of the parts of Poland that had once been German. Most were willing to consider restoring nominal independence to the Poles and Czechs, but even then, both the reduced Polish and Czech states would have to be client states of the Reich. Objections to Nazi foreign policy tended to be over the means, not the ends, with most conservatives taking the viewpoint that Hitler had conducted his foreign policy in a gratuitously aggressive manner that had caused war with Britain and France, made all the more objectionable because the policy of appeasement showed a willingness to accept Germany's return to great power status without a war.

The sweeping success of Hitler's attack on France in May 1940 made the task of deposing him even more difficult. Most army officers, their fears of a war against the western powers apparently proven groundless, and gratified by Germany's revenge against France for the defeat of 1918, reconciled themselves to Hitler's regime, choosing to ignore its darker side. The task of leading the resistance groups for a time fell to civilians, although a core of military plotters remained active.

Carl Goerdeler, the former lord mayor of Leipzig, emerged as a key figure. His associates included the diplomat Ulrich von Hassell, the Prussian Finance Minister Johannes Popitz, and Helmuth James Graf von Moltke, heir to a famous name and the leading figure in the Kreisau Circle of Prussian oppositionists. These oppositionists included other young aristocrats such as Adam von Trott zu Solz, Fritz-Dietlof von der Schulenburg and Peter Yorck von Wartenburg, and later Gottfried Graf von Bismarck-Schönhausen, who was a Nazi member of the Reichstag and a senior officer in the SS. Goerdeler was also in touch with the SPD underground, whose most prominent figure was Julius Leber, and with Christian opposition groups, both Catholic and Protestant.

These men saw themselves as the leaders of a post-Hitler government, but they had no clear conception of how to bring this about, except through assassinating Hitler—a step which many of them still opposed on ethical grounds. Their plans could never surmount the fundamental problem of Hitler's overwhelming popularity among the German people. They preoccupied themselves with philosophical debates and devising grand schemes for postwar Germany. The fact was that for nearly two years after the defeat of France, there was little scope for opposition activity.

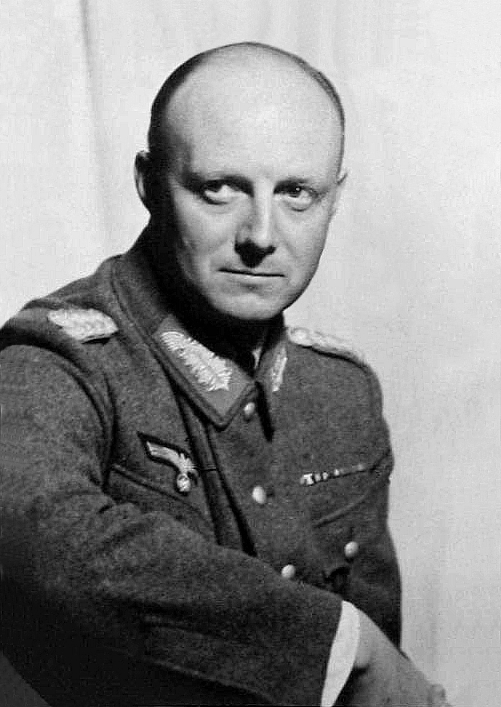
Henning von Tresckow

In March 1941, Hitler revealed his plans for a "war of annihilation" against the Soviet Union to selected army officers in a speech given in occupied Poznań. In the audience was Colonel Henning von Tresckow, who had not been involved in any of the earlier plots but was already a firm opponent of the Nazi regime. He was horrified by Hitler's plan to unleash a new and even more terrible war in the east. As a nephew of Field Marshal Fedor von Bock, he was very well connected. Tresckow appealed unsuccessfully to Bock to not enforce the orders for the "war of annihilation". Assigned to the staff of his uncle's command, Army Group Centre, for the forthcoming Operation Barbarossa, Tresckow systematically recruited oppositionists to the group's staff, making it the new nerve centre of the army resistance.

American journalist Howard K. Smith wrote in 1942 that of the three groups in opposition to Hitler, the military was more important than the churches and the Communists. Little could be done while Hitler's armies advanced triumphantly into the western regions of the Soviet Union through 1941 and 1942—even after the setback before Moscow in December 1941 that led to the dismissal of both Brauchitsch and Bock.

In December 1941, the United States entered the war, persuading some more realistic army officers that Germany would ultimately lose the war. But the life-and-death struggle on the eastern front posed new problems for the resistance. Most of its members were conservatives who hated and feared communism and the Soviet Union. The question of how the Nazi regime could be overthrown and the war ended without allowing the Soviets to gain control of Germany or the whole of Europe was made more acute when the Allies adopted their policy of demanding Germany's "unconditional surrender" at the Casablanca Conference of January 1943.

During 1942, the tireless Oster nevertheless succeeded in rebuilding an effective resistance network. His most important recruit was General Friedrich Olbricht, head of the General Army Office headquartered at the Bendlerblock in central Berlin, who controlled an independent system of communications to reserve units all over Germany. Linking this asset to Tresckow's resistance group in Army Group Centre created what appeared to a viable structure for a new effort at organising a coup. Bock's dismissal did not weaken Tresckow's position. In fact he soon enticed Bock's successor, General Hans von Kluge, to at least partly support the resistance cause. Tresckow even brought Goerdeler, leader of the civilian resistance, to Army Group Centre to meet Kluge—an extremely dangerous move.

Conservatives like Goerdeler were opposed to the Treaty of Versailles and favored restoring the Reich back to the frontiers of 1914, together with keeping Austria. These territorial demands for keeping Alsace-Lorraine together with the parts of Poland that had once belonged to Germany made for many difficulties in Goerdeler's attempts to reach an accord with governments of Britain and the United States. Stauffenberg felt that these were unrealistic demands and Goerdeler would have done better if he was prepared to accept a return to the frontiers created by the Treaty of Versailles. Most of the conservatives favored the creation of an unified Europe led by Germany after the planned overthrow of Hitler. Goerdeler in particular devoted much thought in his memos for a federation of European states and a pan-European economy, while Hassell wrote in his diary of his hopes for an "Occident under German leadership". Moltke envisioned "a great economic community would emerge from the demobilization of armed forces in Europe" that would be "managed by an internal European economic bureaucracy". Trott advocated the tariff and currency union of all the European states, a common European citizenship and a Supreme Court for Europe. As late as May 1944, Goerdeler prepared peace terms that once again called for keeping Austria, the Sudetenland, the Memelland, various parts of Poland, Alsace-Lorraine, and a new demand for keeping South Tirol as well. Even General Beck warned Goerdeler that these demands were completely detached from reality, and would be rejected by the Allies.

=== Increase of civil resistance: 1943–1945 ===
==== Rote Kapelle (Red Orchestra) ====
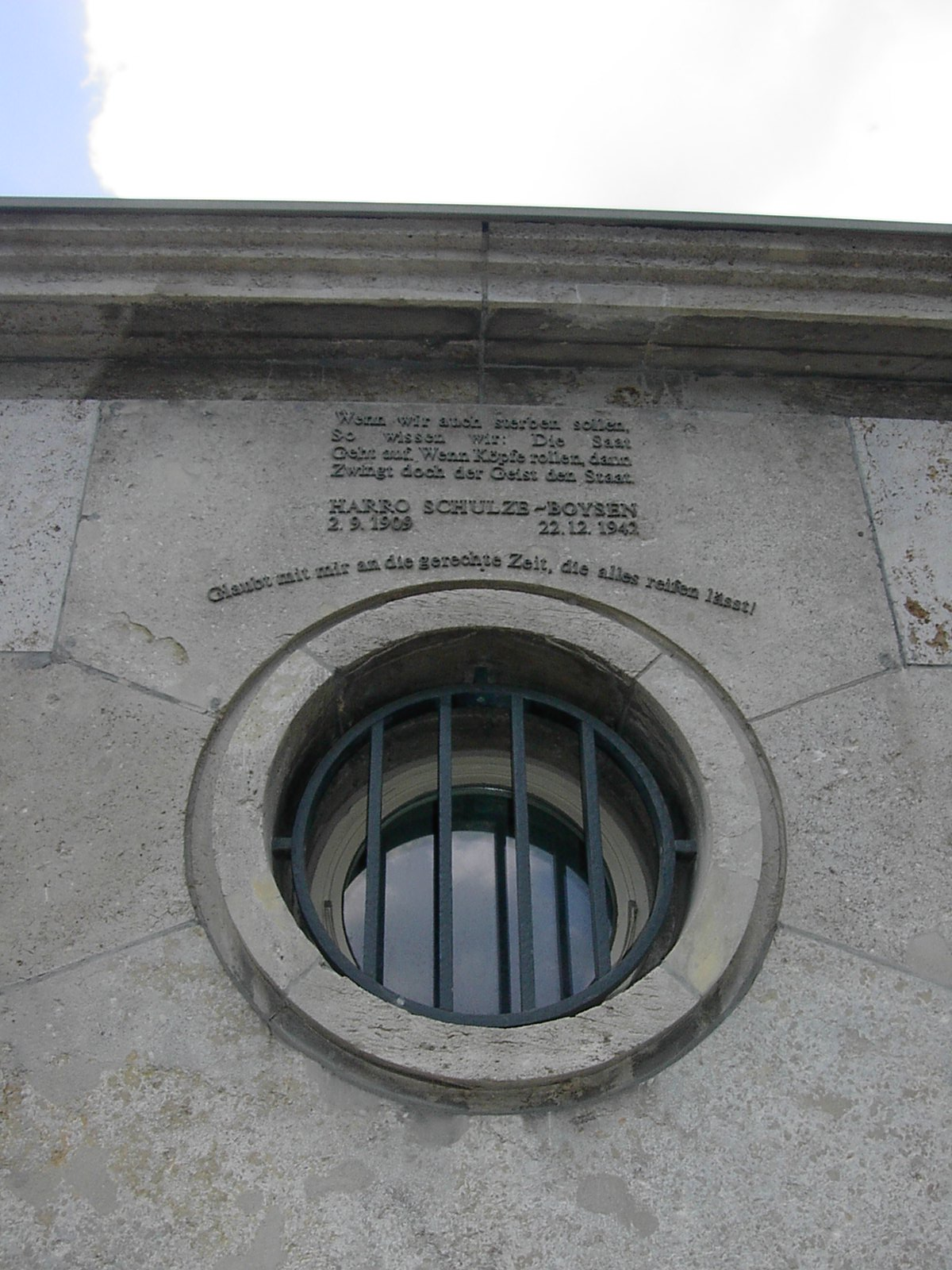
Memorial to Harro Schulze-Boysen, Niederkirchnerstrasse, Berlin

The entry of the Soviet Union into the war had certain consequences for the civilian resistance. During the period of the Nazi–Soviet Pact, the KPD's only objective inside Germany was to keep itself in existence: it engaged in no active resistance to the Nazi regime. After June 1941, however, all Communists were expected to throw themselves into resistance work, including sabotage and espionage where this was possible, regardless of risk. A handful of Soviet agents, mostly exiled German Communists, were able to enter Germany to help the scattered underground KPD cells organise and take action. This led to the formation in 1942 of two separate communist groups, usually erroneously lumped together under the name Rote Kapelle ("Red Orchestra"), a codename given to these groups by the Gestapo.

The first "Red Orchestra" was an espionage network based in Berlin and coordinated by Leopold Trepper, a GRU agent sent into Germany in October 1941. This group made reports to the Soviet Union on German troop concentrations, air attacks on Germany, German aircraft production, and German fuel shipments. In France, it worked with the underground French Communist Party. Agents of this group even managed to tap the phone lines of the Abwehr in Paris. Trepper was eventually arrested and the group broken up by the spring of 1943.

The second and more important "Red Orchestra" group was entirely separate and was a genuine German resistance group, not controlled by the NKVD (the Soviet intelligence agency and predecessor to the KGB). This group was led by Harro Schulze-Boysen, an intelligence officer at the Reich Air Ministry, and Arvid Harnack, an official in the Ministry of Economics, both self-identified communists but not apparently KPD members. The group however contained people of various beliefs and affiliations. It included the theatre producer Adam Kuckhoff, the author Günther Weisenborn, the journalist John Graudenz and the pianist Helmut Roloff. It thus conformed to the general pattern of German resistance groups of being drawn mainly from elite groups.

The main activity of the group was collecting information about Nazi atrocities and distributing leaflets against Hitler rather than espionage. They passed what they had learned to foreign countries, through personal contacts with the U.S. embassy and, via a less direct connection, to the Soviet government. When Soviet agents tried to enlist this group in their service, Schulze-Boysen and Harnack refused, since they wanted to maintain their political independence. The group was revealed to the Gestapo in August 1942 by Johann Wenzel, a member of the Trepper group who also knew of the Schulze-Boysen group and who informed on them after being discovered and tortured for several weeks. Schulze-Boysen, Harnack and other members of the group were arrested and secretly executed.

Meanwhile, another Communist resistance group was operating in Berlin, led by a Jewish electrician, Herbert Baum, and involving up to a hundred people. Until 1941, the group operated a study circle, but after the German attack on the Soviet Union a core group advanced to active resistance. In May 1942, the group staged an arson attack on an anti-Soviet propaganda display at the Lustgarten in central Berlin. The attack was poorly organised and most of the Baum group was arrested. Twenty were sentenced to death, while Baum himself "died in custody". This fiasco ended overt Communist resistance activities, although the KPD underground continued to operate, and re-emerged from hiding in the last days of the war.

==== After Stalingrad ====
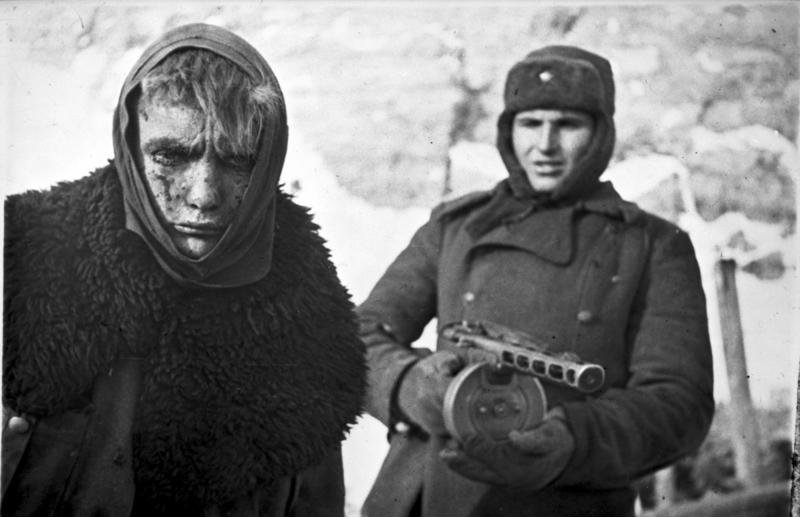
Red Army soldier marches a German soldier into captivity after the victory at the Battle of Stalingrad.

At the end of 1942, Germany suffered a series of military defeats, the first at El Alamein, the second with the successful Allied landings in North Africa (Operation Torch), and the third the disastrous defeat at Stalingrad, which ended any hope of defeating the Soviet Union. Most experienced senior officers now came to the conclusion that Hitler was leading Germany to defeat, and that the result of this would be the Soviet conquest of Germany—the worst fate imaginable. This gave the military resistance new impetus.

Halder had been dismissed in 1942 and there was now no independent central leadership of the Army. His nominal successors, Field Marshal Wilhelm Keitel and General Alfred Jodl, were no more than Hitler's messengers. Tresckow and Goerdeler tried again to recruit the senior Army field commanders to support a seizure of power. Kluge was by now won over completely. Gersdorff was sent to see Field Marshal Erich von Manstein, the commander of Army Group South in Ukraine. Manstein agreed that Hitler was leading Germany to defeat, but told Gersdorff that "Prussian field marshals do not mutiny." Field Marshal Gerd von Rundstedt, commander in the west, gave a similar answer. The prospect of a united German Army seizing power from Hitler was as far away as ever. Once again, however, neither officer reported that they had been approached in this way.

Nevertheless, the days when the military and civilian plotters could expect to escape detection were ending. After Stalingrad, Himmler would have had to be naïve not to expect that conspiracies against the regime would be hatched in the Army and elsewhere. He already suspected Canaris and his subordinates at the Abwehr. In March 1943, two of them, Oster and Hans von Dohnányi, were dismissed on suspicion of opposition activity, although there was yet insufficient evidence to have them arrested. On the civilian front, Dietrich Bonhoeffer was also arrested at this time, and Goerdeler was under suspicion.

The Gestapo had been led to Dohnanyi following the arrest of Wilhelm Schmidhuber, who had helped Dohnanyi with information and with smuggling Jews out of Germany. Under interrogation, Schmidhuber gave the Gestapo details of the Oster-Dohnanyi group in the Abwehr and about Goerdeler and Beck's involvement in opposition activities. The Gestapo reported all this to Himmler, with the observation that Canaris must be protecting Oster and Dohnanyi and the recommendation that he be arrested. Himmler passed the file back with the note "Kindly leave Canaris alone." Either Himmler felt Canaris was too powerful to tackle at this stage, or he wanted him and his oppositional network protected for reasons of his own. Nevertheless, Oster's usefulness to the resistance was now greatly reduced. However, the Gestapo did not have information about the full workings of the resistance. Most importantly, they did not know about the resistance networks based on Army Group Centre or the Bendlerblock.

Meanwhile, the disaster at Stalingrad, which cost Germany 400,000 casualties, was sending waves of horror and grief through German society, but causing little reduction in the people's faith in Hitler and in Germany's ultimate victory. This was a source of frustration to the military and civil service plotters, who all came from the elite and had privileged access to information, giving them appreciation of the hopelessness of Germany's situation than was possessed by the German people.

==== 1942–1943 ====
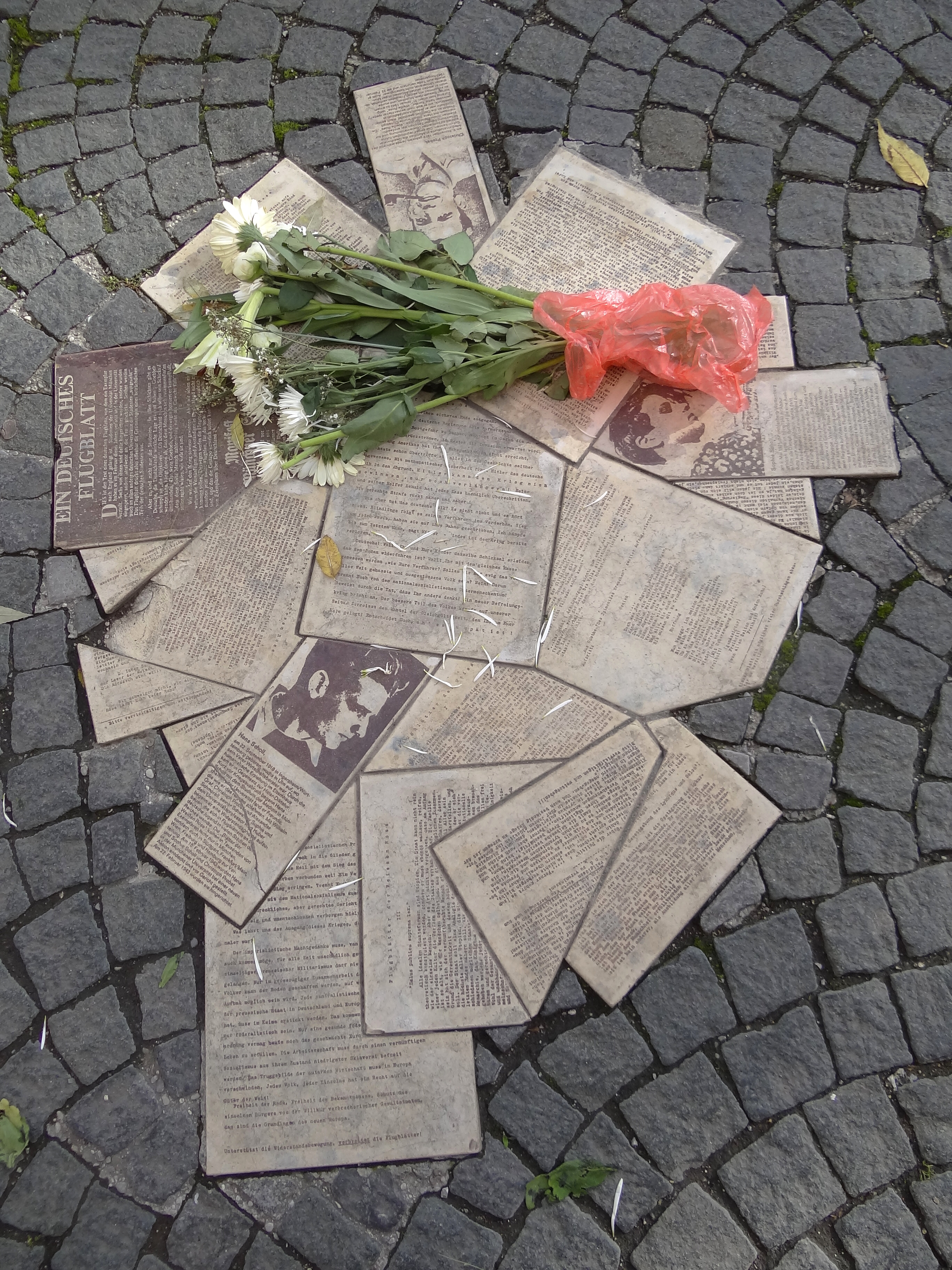
Memorial for the White Rose in front of the main building of LMU Munich in Munich

The only visible manifestation of opposition to the regime following Stalingrad were organisations created by KPD (which was directly associated with the Soviet Union), the National Committee for a Free Germany (NKFD) and its League of German Officers, formed by the prisoners of war, both created in the Soviet Union, and the Anti-Fascist Committee for a Free Germany in Greece which was associated with NKFD; in Germany, there were manifestations such as the secret groups of the Workers' Movement, like the Anti-Nazi German People's Front, which contacted forced labourers and prisoners of war, which also tended to create groups, the most significant of which was the Fraternal Cooperation of Prisoners of War, and spontaneous action of a few university students who denounced the war and the persecution and mass murder of Jews in the east. The latter were organised in the White Rose group, which was centered in Munich but had connections in Berlin, Hamburg, Stuttgart and Vienna.

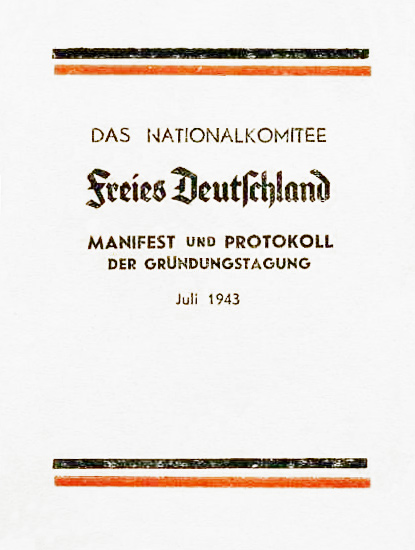
Official manifesto of NKFD (note the flag of the German Empire)

In the spring of 1942, they launched an anti-Nazi campaign of handbills in and around LMU Munich in Munich. This campaign was paused when three of the main members, Hans Scholl, Alexander Schmorell, and Willi Graf, were sent to the Russian Front in July 1942. The group continued when they came back to Munich in November 1942. In January 1943, the fifth pamphlet was published; titled "A Call to All Germans!" The leaflet berated the ordinary Germans for still supporting Hitler, even though the war was "Approaching its destined end." On February 3, 8, and 15, Hans, Willi and Alexander snuck out at night to graffiti LMU Munich and other nearby houses with slogans such as, "Down with Hitler!" And "Hitler the Mass Murderer!" These actions put the Gestapo on high alert.

On February 18, 1943, Hans and Sophie snuck into the university to place leaflets in the halls when the students were in class. They were noticed by a custodian, who reported them to the Gestapo. Hans Scholl, Sophie Scholl, and Christoph Probst stood trial before the Nazi "People's Court", on 22 February 1943. The President of the court, Roland Freisler, sentenced them to death. They were guillotined that same day at Stadelheim Prison. Kurt Huber, a professor of philosophy and musicology, Alexander Schmorell, and Willi Graf stood trial later and were sentenced to death as well, while many others were sentenced to prison terms. The last member to be executed was Hans Conrad Leipelt on 29 January 1945.

This outbreak was surprising and worrying to the Nazi regime, because the universities had been strongholds of Nazi sentiment even before Hitler had come to power. Similarly, it gave heart to the scattered and demoralised resistance groups. But the White Rose was not a sign of widespread civilian disaffection from the regime, and had no imitators elsewhere, although their sixth leaflet, re-titled "The Manifesto of the Students of Munich", was dropped by Allied planes in July 1943, and became widely known in World War II Germany. The underground SPD and KPD were able to maintain their networks, and reported increasing discontent at the course of the war and at the resultant economic hardship, particularly among the industrial workers and among farmers (who suffered from the acute shortage of labour with so many young men away at the front). However, there was nothing approaching active hostility to the regime. Most Germans continued to revere Hitler and blamed Himmler or other subordinates for their troubles. From late 1943, fear of the advancing Soviets and prospects of a military offensive from the Western Powers eclipsed resentment at the regime and if anything hardened the will to resist the advancing allies.

==== Aktion Rheinland ====
One of the final acts of resistance was Aktion Rheinland, an operation carried out by the resistance group in Düsseldorf led by Karl August Wiedenhofen. The goal was to surrender the city of Düsseldorf to the advancing Americans without any fighting, thereby preventing further destruction. The action occurred during the latter stages of the encirclement of the Ruhr Pocket, with Wiedenhofen's group briefly taking over police headquarters on 16 April 1945. Despite the plan being betrayed (leading to the execution of five Resistance fighters), other fighters managed to reach American lines, leading to the virtually bloodless capture of the city on 17 April.

==== Antifascist Committees ====
Shortly before or after the takeover of various German towns by the Allies, local activists, usually of the left-wing views, created the so-called Antifascist Committees, or Antifas, and workplace councils; these organisation had a strong social base in industrial regions with traditions of labour movement, where they could emerge from already existing resistance circles, while in smaller towns and regions, the committees were created only after the arrival of the Allies, becoming provisional self-government bodies under the occupation. If the local committees were formed before the Allied occupation, their activities were propaganda aimed at the German armed forces and Volkssturm calling for peaceful and bloodless surrender, negotiating the release of political prisoners with local Gestapo and SS units (like in Zwickau), and in some cases, armed resistance to the Nazi regime, like in Flöha, where the local Antifa managed to form armed groups, disarm the local police, depose the Bürgermeister and take control of the town. The Antifas were diverse in terms of their size and ideologies: while usually they were formed on the principles of popular fronts and bourgeoise parliamentarism, in some places they presented themselves as socialist revolutionary authorities: for example, in Meissen, the local Antifa called itself the 'Council of People's Commissars', organized a Soviet type of government and started expropriating property.

== By groups ==
=== Workers' and left-wing resistance ===
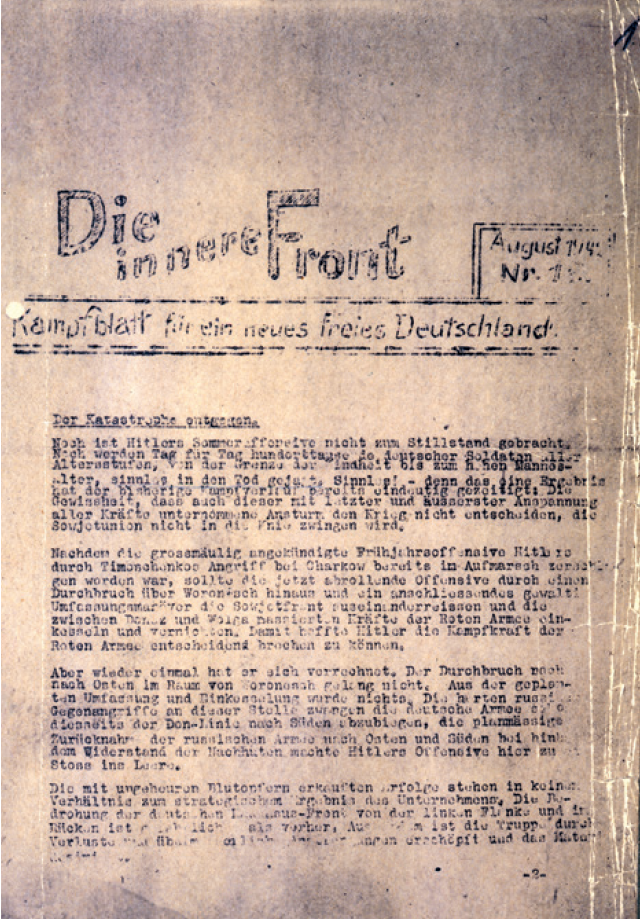
A copy of an illegal leaflet from the series Die Innere Front, No. 12 from August 1943, published by the German Communists from the Neukölln area of Berlin

Most opposition to the Nazi regime in the political sector both during their rise to power and after their seizure of power came from Social Democrats and Communists. The only party to vote against the Enabling Act of 1933 that gave Adolf Hitler emergency powers was the Social Democratic Party — the Communist Party of Germany had already been expelled from Parliament and its members were not allowed to take their seats in the Reichstag. Even after its ban in Germany as a party the Social Democrats would operate in-exile as the sopade.

After the outbreak of World War II, the left-wing opponents of the Nazi regime, Communists, anarchist, socialists, Social Democrats, and labor union members, tried to create an anti-Nazi workers' movement by setting up resistance groups in the workplaces, spreading counter-propaganda, attempting to sabotage the armaments industry, and supporting persecuted people. Among these resistance groups were the Saefkow-Jacob-Bästlein Organization and the Bästlein-Jacob-Abshagen Group, European Union, Rote Kämpfer, New Beginning, and the Red Shock Troop. In 1945, shortly before the takeover of German towns by the Allies, the left-wing groups and circles established the so-called Antifascist Committees, or Antifas, which served as provisional self-government bodies under the Allied occupation (see above).

One of the biggest resistance organisations was the Anti-Nazi German People's Front (ADV), based around Munich, created by the members of the Communist Party of Germany and the Christian Social Reich Party. Its main goals were to unite the working class with the prosecuted people, Ostarbeiters and prisoners of war in a large movement that would overthrow the Nazi regime, based on the experience of the November Revolution. Between 1942 and 1943, the organisation managed to create groups in factories of Munich and other cities of Southern Germany, and to contact the prisoners of labor camps. Like European Union, it supported contacts with Fraternal Cooperation of Prisoners of War, an organisation set up by captured Soviet officers that set up resistance cells "in all the prisoner of war camps of southern Germany and in over twenty camps" for Ostarbeiters. ADV was suppressed by Gestapo after August 1943.

=== Christian resistance ===
Though neither the Catholic nor Protestant churches as institutions were prepared to openly oppose the Nazi State, it was from the clergy that some elements of the German Resistance to the policies of the Third Reich emerged. From the outset of Nazi rule in 1933, issues emerged which brought the churches into conflict with the regime. They offered organised, systematic and consistent resistance to government policies which infringed on ecclesiastical autonomy. As one of the few German institutions to retain some independence from the state, the churches were able to co-ordinate a level of opposition to Government, and, according to Joachim Fest, they, more than any other institutions, continued to provide a "forum in which individuals could distance themselves from the regime". Christian morality and the anti-Church policies of the Nazis also motivated many German resisters and provided impetus for the "moral revolt" of individuals in their efforts to overthrow Hitler. The historian Wolf cites events such as the July Plot of 1944 as having been "inconceivable without the spiritual support of church resistance".

"From the very beginning", wrote Hamerow, "some churchmen expressed, quite directly at times, their reservations about the new order. In fact those reservations gradually came to form a coherent, systematic critique of many of the teachings of National Socialism." Clergy in the German Resistance had some independence from the state apparatus, and could thus criticise it, while not being close enough to the centre of power to take steps to overthrow it. "Clerical resistors", wrote Theodore S. Hamerow, could indirectly "articulate political dissent in the guise of pastoral stricture". They usually spoke out not against the established system, but "only against specific policies that it had mistakenly adopted and that it should therefore properly correct". Later, the most trenchant public criticism of the Third Reich came from some of Germany's religious leaders, as the government was reluctant to move against them, and though they could claim to be merely attending to the spiritual welfare of their flocks, "what they had to say was at times so critical of the central doctrines of National Socialism that to say it required great boldness", and they became resistors. Their resistance was directed not only against intrusions by the government into church governance and to arrests of clergy and expropriation of church property, but also to matters like Nazi euthanasia and eugenics and to the fundamentals of human rights and justice as the foundation of a political system. A senior cleric could rely on a degree of popular support from the faithful, and thus the regime had to consider the possibility of nationwide protests if such figures were arrested. Thus the Catholic Bishop of Münster, Clemens August Graf von Galen and Dr Theophil Wurm, the Protestant Bishop of Württemberg were able to rouse widespread public opposition to murder of invalids.

For figures like the Jesuit Provincial of Bavaria, Augustin Rösch, the Catholic trade unionists Jakob Kaiser and Bernhard Letterhaus and the July Plot leader Claus von Stauffenberg, "religious motives and the determination to resist would seem to have developed hand in hand". Ernst Wolf wrote that some credit must be given to the resistance of the churches, for providing "moral stimulus and guidance for the political Resistance...". Virtually all of the military conspirators in the July Plot were religious men. Among the social democrat political conspirators, the Christian influence was also strong, though humanism also played a significant foundational role—and among the wider circle there were other political, military and nationalist motivations at play. Religious motivations were particularly strong in the Kreisau Circle of the Resistance. The Kreisau leader Helmuth James Graf von Moltke declared in one of his final letters before execution that the essence of the July revolt was "outrage of the Christian conscience".

In the words of Kershaw, the churches "engaged in a bitter war of attrition with the regime, receiving the demonstrative backing of millions of churchgoers. Applause for Church leaders whenever they appeared in public, swollen attendances at events such as Corpus Christi Day processions, and packed church services were outward signs of the struggle of... especially of the Catholic Church—against Nazi oppression". While the Church ultimately failed to protect its youth organisations and schools, it did have some successes in mobilizing public opinion to alter government policies. The churches challenged Nazi efforts to undermine various Christian institutions, practices and beliefs and Bullock wrote that "among the most courageous demonstrations of opposition during the war were the sermons preached by the Catholic Bishop of Münster and the Protestant Pastor, Dr Niemoller..." but that nevertheless, "Neither the Catholic Church nor the Evangelical Church... as institutions, felt it possible to take up an attitude of open opposition to the regime".

==== Catholic resistance ====
In the 1920s and 1930s, the main Christian opposition to Nazism had come from the Catholic Church. German bishops were hostile to the emerging movement and energetically denounced its "false doctrines". A threatening, though initially mainly sporadic persecution of the Catholic Church in Germany followed the Nazi takeover. Hitler moved quickly to eliminate Political Catholicism, rounding up members of the Catholic political parties and banning their existence in July 1933. Vice Chancellor Franz von Papen, the leader of the Catholic right-wing, meanwhile negotiated a Reich concordat with the Holy See, which prohibited clergy from participating in politics. Catholic resistance initially diminished after the Concordat, with Cardinal Bertram of Breslau, the chairman of the German Conference of Bishops, developing an ineffectual protest system. Firmer resistance by Catholic leaders gradually reasserted itself by the individual actions of leading churchmen like Josef Frings, Konrad von Preysing, Clemens August Graf von Galen and Michael von Faulhaber. Most Catholic opposition to the regime came from the Catholic left-wing in the Christian trade unions, such as by the union leaders Jakob Kaiser and Nikolaus Gross. Hoffmann writes that, from the beginning:

"[The Catholic Church] could not silently accept the general persecution, regimentation or oppression, nor in particular the sterilization law of summer 1933. Over the years until the outbreak of war Catholic resistance stiffened until finally its most eminent spokesman was the Pope himself with his encyclical Mit brennender Sorge... of 14 March 1937, read from all German Catholic pulpits. Clemens August Graf von Galen, Bishop of Munster, was typical of the many fearless Catholic speakers. In general terms, therefore, the churches were the only major organisations to offer comparatively early and open resistance: they remained so in later years.

— Extract from The History of the German Resistance 1933–1945 by Peter Hoffmann

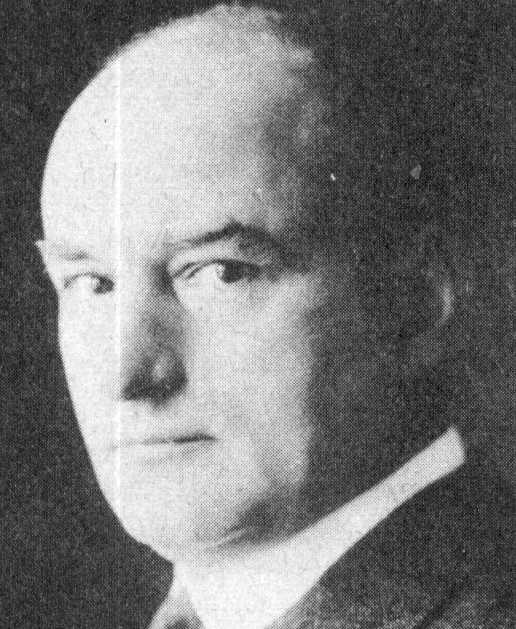
Erich Klausener, the head of Catholic Action, was assassinated in Hitler's bloody night of the long knives purge of 1934.

In the year following Hitler's "seizure of power", old political players looked for means to overthrow the new government. The former Catholic Centre Party leader and Reich Chancellor Heinrich Brüning looked for a way to oust Hitler. Erich Klausener, an influential civil servant and president of Berlin's Catholic Action group organised Catholic conventions in Berlin in 1933, and 1934 and spoke against political oppression to a crowd of 60,000 at the 1934 rally. Deputy Reich Chancellor von Papen, a conservative Catholic nobleman, delivered an indictment of the Nazi government in his Marburg speech of 17 June. His speech writer Edgar Jung, a Catholic Action worker, seized the opportunity to reassert the Christian foundation of the state, pleaded for religious freedom, and rejected totalitarian aspirations in the field of religion, hoping to spur a rising, centred on Hindenburg, Papen and the army.

Hitler decided to strike at his chief political opponents in the Night of the Long Knives. The purge lasted two days over 30 June and 1 July 1934. Leading rivals of Hitler were killed. High-profile Catholic resistors were targeted—Klausener and Jung were murdered. Adalbert Probst, the national director of the Catholic Youth Sports Association, was also killed. The Catholic press was targeted too, with anti-Nazi journalist Fritz Gerlich among the dead. On 2 August 1934, the aged President von Hindenburg died. The offices of President and Chancellor were combined, and Hitler ordered the Army to swear an oath directly to him. Hitler declared his "revolution" complete.

Cardinal Michael von Faulhaber gained an early reputation as a critic of the Nazis. His three Advent sermons of 1933, entitled Judaism, Christianity, and Germany denounced the Nazi extremists who were calling for the Bible to be purged of the "Jewish" Old Testament. Faulhaber tried to avoid conflict with the state over issues not strictly pertaining to the church, but on issues involving the defence of Catholics he refused to compromise or retreat. When in 1937 the authorities in Upper Bavaria attempted to replace Catholic schools with "common schools", he offered fierce resistance. Among the most firm and consistent of senior Catholics to oppose the Nazis was Konrad von Preysing, Bishop of Berlin from 1935. He worked with leading members of the resistance Carl Goerdeler and Helmuth James Graf von Moltke. He was part of the five-member commission that prepared the Mit brennender Sorge anti-Nazi encyclical of March 1937, and sought to block the Nazi closure of Catholic schools and arrests of church officials.

While Hitler did not feel powerful enough to arrest senior clergy before the end of the war, an estimated one third of German priests faced some form of reprisal from the Nazi Government and 400 German priests were sent to the dedicated Priest Barracks of Dachau Concentration Camp alone. Among the best known German priest martyrs were the Jesuit Alfred Delp and Fr Bernhard Lichtenberg. Lichtenberg ran Bishop von Preysing's aid unit (the Hilfswerke beim Bischöflichen Ordinariat Berlin) which secretly assisted those who were being persecuted by the regime. Arrested in 1941, he died en route to Dachau Concentration Camp in 1943. Delp—along with fellow Jesuits Augustin Rösch and Lothar König—was among the central players of the Kreisau Circle Resistance group. Bishop von Preysing also had contact with the group. The group combined conservative notions of reform with socialist strains of thought—a symbiosis expressed by Delp's notion of "personal socialism". Among the German laity, Gertrud Luckner, was among the first to sense the genocidal inclinations of the Hitler regime and to take national action. She cooperated with Lichtenberg and Delp and attempted to establish a national underground network to assist Jews through the Catholic aid agency Caritas. Using international contacts she secured safe passage abroad for many refugees. She organized aid circles for Jews, assisted many to escape. Arrested in 1943, she only narrowly escaped death in the concentration camps. Social worker Margarete Sommer counselled victims of racial persecution for Caritas Emergency Relief and in 1941 became director of the Welfare Office of the Berlin Diocesan Authority, under Lichtenberg, and Bishop Preysing. She coordinated Catholic aid for victims of racial persecution—giving spiritual comfort, food, clothing, and money and wrote several reports on the mistreatment of Jews from 1942, including an August 1942 report which reached Rome under the title "Report on the Exodus of the Jews".

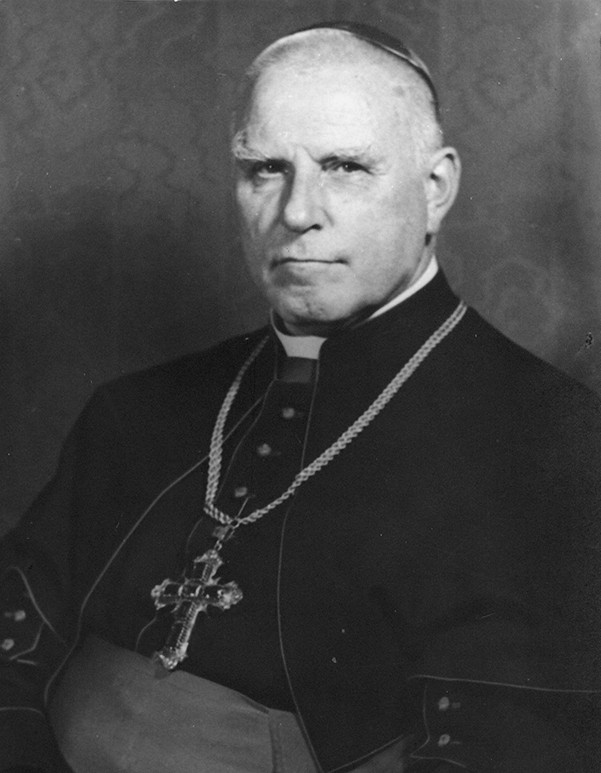
Clemens August Graf von Galen, Bishop of Munster, condemned Nazi policies from the pulpit.

Even at the height of Hitler's popularity, one issue unexpectedly provoked powerful and successful resistance to his regime. This was the programme of so-called "euthanasia"—in fact a campaign of mass murder—directed at people with mental illness and/or severe physical disabilities which had begun in 1939 under the code name T4. By 1941, more than 70,000 people had been killed under this programme, many by gassing, and their bodies incinerated. This policy aroused strong opposition across German society, and especially among Catholics. Opposition to the policy sharpened after the German attack on the Soviet Union in June 1941, because the war in the east produced for the first time large-scale German casualties, and the hospitals and asylums began to fill up with maimed and disabled young German soldiers. Rumours began to circulate that these men would also be subject to "euthanasia," although no such plans existed.

Catholic anger was further fuelled by actions of the Gauleiter of Upper Bavaria, Adolf Wagner, a militantly anti-Catholic Nazi, who in June 1941 ordered the removal of crucifixes from all schools in his Gau. This attack on Catholicism provoked the first public demonstrations against government policy since the Nazis had come to power, and the mass signing of petitions, including by Catholic soldiers serving at the front. When Hitler heard of this he ordered Wagner to rescind his decree, but the damage had been done—German Catholics had learned that the regime could be successfully opposed. This led to more outspoken protests against the "euthanasia" programme.

In July, the Bishop of Münster, Clemens August Graf von Galen (an old aristocratic conservative, like many of the anti-Hitler army officers), publicly denounced the "euthanasia" programme in a sermon, and telegrammed his text to Hitler, calling on "the Führer to defend the people against the Gestapo." Another Bishop, Franz Bornewasser of Trier, also sent protests to Hitler, though not in public. On 3 August, Galen was even more outspoken, broadening his attack to include the Nazi persecution of religious orders and the closing of Catholic institutions. Local Nazis asked for Galen to be arrested, but Propaganda Minister Joseph Goebbels told Hitler that if this happened there would be an open revolt in Westphalia. Galen's sermons went further than defending the church, he spoke of a moral danger to Germany from the regime's violations of basic human rights: "the right to life, to inviolability, and to freedom is an indispensable part of any moral social order", he said—and any government that punishes without court proceedings "undermines its own authority and respect for its sovereignty within the conscience of its citizens".

By August, the protests had spread to Bavaria. Hitler was jeered by an angry crowd at Hof, near Nuremberg—the only time he was opposed to his face in public during his 12 years of rule. Hitler knew that he could not afford a confrontation with the Church at a time when Germany was engaged in a life-and-death two-front war. (It needs to be remembered that following the annexations of Austria and the Sudetenland, nearly half of all Germans were Catholic.) On 24 August he ordered the cancellation of the T4 programme and issued strict instructions to the Gauleiters that there were to be no further provocations of the churches during the war.

Pius XII became Pope on the eve of World War II, and maintained links to the German Resistance. Although remaining publicly neutral, Pius advised the British in 1940 of the readiness of certain German generals to overthrow Hitler if they could be assured of an honourable peace, offered assistance to the German resistance in the event of a coup and warned the Allies of the planned German invasion of the Low Countries in 1940. In 1943, Pius issued the Mystici corporis Christi encyclical, in which he condemned the practice of killing the disabled. He stated his "profound grief" at the murder of the deformed, the insane, and those suffering from hereditary disease... as though they were a useless burden to Society", in condemnation of the ongoing Nazi euthanasia program. The Encyclical was followed, on 26 September 1943, by an open condemnation by the German Bishops which, from every German pulpit, denounced the killing of "innocent and defenceless mentally handicapped, incurably infirm and fatally wounded, innocent hostages, and disarmed prisoners of war and criminal offenders, people of a foreign race or descent".

However, the deportation of Polish and Dutch priests by the occupying Nazis by 1942—after Polish resistance acts and the Dutch Catholic bishops' conference's official condemnation of anti-Semitic persecutions and deportations of Jews by the Nazis—also terrified ethnic German clergy in Germany itself, some of whom would come to share the same fate because of their resistance against the Nazi government in racial and social aspects, among them Fr. Bernhard Lichtenberg. Himmler's 1941 Aktion Klostersturm (Operation Attack-the-Monastery) had also helped to spread fear among regime-critical Catholic clergy.

==== Protestant resistance to the Nazi regime ====
Following the Nazi takeover, Hitler attempted the subjugation of the Protestant churches under a single Reich Church. He divided the Lutheran Church (Germany's main Protestant denomination) and instigated a brutal persecution of Jehovah's Witnesses, who refused military service and allegiance to Hitlerism. Pastor Martin Niemöller responded with the Pastors Emergency League which re-affirmed the Bible. The movement grew into the Confessing Church, from which some clergymen opposed the Nazi regime. By 1934, the Confessing Church had promulgated the Theological Declaration of Barmen and declared itself the legitimate Protestant Church of Germany. In response to the regime's attempt to establish a state church, in March 1935, the Confessing Church Synod announced:

We see our nation threatened with mortal danger; the danger lies in a new religion. The Church has been ordered by its Master to see that Christ is honoured by our nation in a manner befitting the Judge of the world. The Church knows that it will be called to account if the German nation turns its back on Christ without being forewarned".

— 1935 Confessing Church Synod

In May 1936, the Confessing Church sent Hitler a memorandum courteously objecting to the "anti-Christian" tendencies of his regime, condemning anti-Semitism and asking for an end to interference in church affairs. Paul Berben wrote, "A Church envoy was sent to Hitler to protest against the religious persecutions, the concentration camps, and the activities of the Gestapo, and to demand freedom of speech, particularly in the press." The Nazi Minister of the Interior, Wilhelm Frick responded harshly. Hundreds of pastors were arrested; Dr Weissler, a signatory to the memorandum, was killed at Sachsenhausen concentration camp and the funds of the church were confiscated and collections forbidden. Church resistance stiffened and by early 1937, Hitler had abandoned his hope of uniting the Protestant churches.

The Confessing Church was banned on 1 July 1937. Niemöller was arrested by the Gestapo, and sent to the concentration camps. He remained mainly at Dachau until the fall of the regime. Theological universities were closed, and other pastors and theologians arrested.

Dietrich Bonhoeffer, another leading spokesman for the Confessing Church, was from the outset a critic of the Hitler regime's racism and became active in the German Resistance—calling for Christians to speak out against Nazi atrocities. Arrested in 1943, he was implicated in the 1944 July Plot to assassinate Hitler and executed.

=== In the Army ===
Despite the removal of Blomberg and Fritsch, the army retained considerable independence, and senior officers were able to discuss their political views in private fairly freely. In May 1938, the army leadership was made aware of Hitler's intention of invading Czechoslovakia, even at the risk of war with Britain, France, and/or the Soviet Union. The Army Chief of Staff, General Ludwig Beck, regarded this as not only immoral but reckless, since he believed that Germany would lose such a war. Oster and Beck sent emissaries to Paris and London to advise the British and French to resist Hitler's demands, and thereby strengthen the hand of Hitler's opponents in the Army. Weizsäcker also sent private messages to London urging resistance. The British and French were extremely doubtful of the ability of the German opposition to overthrow the Nazi regime and ignored these messages. An official of the British Foreign Office wrote on August 28, 1938: "We have had similar visits from other emissaries of the Reichsheer, such as Dr. Goerdeler, but those for whom these emissaries claim to speak have never given us any reasons to suppose that they would be able or willing to take action such as would lead to the overthrow of the regime. The events of June 1934 and February 1938 do not lead one to attach much hope to energetic action by the Army against the regime" Because of the failure of Germans to overthrow their Führer in 1938, the British Prime Minister Neville Chamberlain was convinced that the resistance comprised a group of people seemingly not well organized.

Writing of the 1938 conspiracy, the German historian Klaus-Jürgen Müller observed that the conspiracy was a loosely organized collection of two different groups. One group comprising the army's Chief of Staff General Ludwig Beck, the Abwehr chief, Admiral Wilhelm Canaris, and the Foreign Office's State Secretary, Baron Ernst von Weizsäcker were the "anti-war" group in the German government, which was determined to avoid a war in 1938 that it felt Germany would lose. This group was not committed to the overthrow of the regime but was loosely allied to another, more radical group, the "anti-Nazi" fraction centered on Colonel Hans Oster and Hans Bernd Gisevius, which wanted to use the crisis as an excuse for executing a putsch to overthrow the Nazi regime. The divergent aims between these two factions produced considerable tensions. The historian Eckart Conze in a 2010 interview stated about the "anti-war" group in 1938:

"An overthrow of Hitler was out of the question. The group wanted to avoid a major war and the potential catastrophic consequences for Germany. Their goal wasn't to get rid of the dictator but, as they saw it, to bring him to his senses."

In August, Beck spoke openly at a meeting of army generals in Berlin about his opposition to a war with the western powers over Czechoslovakia. When Hitler was informed of this, he demanded and received Beck's resignation. Beck was highly respected in the army and his removal shocked the officer corps. His successor as chief of staff, Franz Halder, remained in touch with him, and was also in touch with Oster. Privately, he said that he considered Hitler "the incarnation of evil". During September, plans for a move against Hitler were formulated, involving General Erwin von Witzleben, who was the army commander of the Berlin Military Region and thus well-placed to stage a coup.

Oster, Gisevius, and Schacht urged Halder and Beck to stage an immediate coup against Hitler, but the army officers argued that they could only mobilize support among the officer corps for such a step if Hitler made overt moves towards war. Halder nevertheless asked Oster to draw up plans for a coup. Weizsäcker and Canaris were made aware of these plans. The conspirators disagreed on what to do about Hitler if there was a successful army coup—eventually most overcame their scruples and agreed that he must be killed so that army officers would be free from their oath of loyalty. They agreed Halder would instigate the coup when Hitler committed an overt step towards war. During the planning for the 1938 putsch, Carl Friedrich Goerdeler was in contact through the intermediary of General Alexander von Falkenhausen with Chinese intelligence Most German conservatives favoured Germany's traditional informal alliance with China, and were strongly opposed to the about-face in Germany's Far Eastern policies effected in early 1938 by Joachim von Ribbentrop, who abandoned the alliance with China for an alignment with Japan. As a consequence, agents of Chinese intelligence supported the proposed putsch as a way of restoring the Sino-German alliance.

The army commander, General Walther von Brauchitsch, was well aware of the coup preparations. He told Halder he could not condone such an act, but he did not inform Hitler, to whom he was outwardly subservient, of what he knew. This was a striking example of the code of silent solidarity among senior German Army officers, which was to survive and provide a shield for the resistance groups down to, and in many cases beyond, the crisis of July 1944.

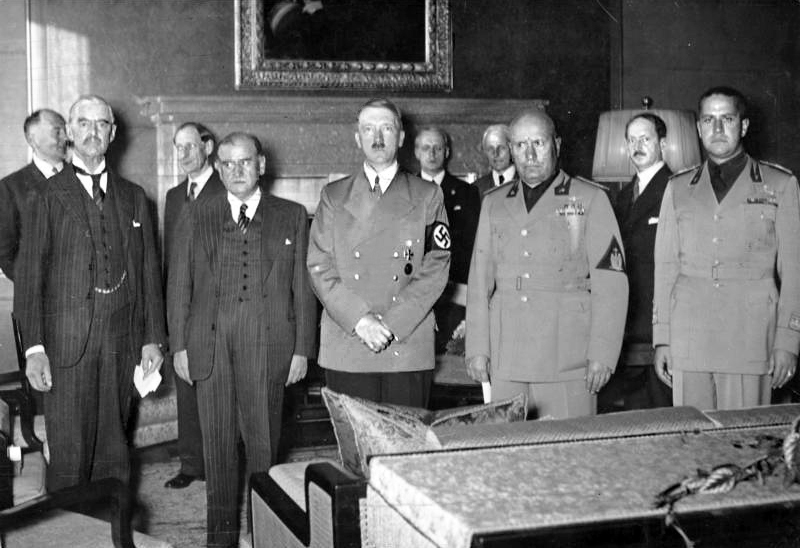
From left to right, Neville Chamberlain, Édouard Daladier, Adolf Hitler, Benito Mussolini and Italian Foreign Minister Count Ciano as they prepare to sign the Munich Agreement

On 13 September, the British Prime Minister, Neville Chamberlain, announced that he would visit Germany to meet Hitler and defuse the crisis over Czechoslovakia. This threw the conspirators into uncertainty. When, on 20 September, it appeared that the negotiations had broken down and that Chamberlain would resist Hitler's demands, the coup preparations were revived and finalised. All that was required was the signal from Halder.

On 28 September, however Chamberlain agreed to a meeting in Munich, at which he accepted the dismemberment of Czechoslovakia. This plunged the resistance into demoralisation and division. Halder said he would no longer support a coup. The other conspirators were bitterly critical of Chamberlain, but were powerless to act. This was the nearest approach to a successful conspiracy against Hitler before the plot of 20 July 1944. In December 1938, Goerdeler visited Britain to seek support. Goerdeler's demands for the Polish Corridor to be returned to Germany together with former colonies in Africa together with a loan to a post-Hitler government made a very poor impression with the British Foreign Office, not the least because he seemed to differ with the Nazis only in degree rather than in kind. In June 1939, Adam von Trott visited Britain where he presented his "Danzig for Prague" plan, offering to restore Czech independence (through Germany would keep the Sudetenland) in exchange for which Britain would pressure Poland to return the Polish Corridor and the Free City of Danzig to Germany.

As war again grew more likely in mid-1939, the plans for a pre-emptive coup were revived. Oster was still in contact with Halder and Witzleben, although Witzleben had been transferred to Frankfurt am Main, reducing his ability to lead a coup attempt. At a meeting with Goerdeler, Witzleben agreed to form a network of army commanders willing to take part to prevent a war against the western powers. But support in the officer corps for a coup had dropped sharply since 1938. Most officers, particularly those from Prussian landowning backgrounds, were strongly anti-Polish. Just before the invasion of Poland in August 1939, General Eduard Wagner who was one of the officers involved in the abortive putsch of September 1938, wrote in a letter to his wife: "We believe we will make quick work of the Poles, and in truth, we are delighted at the prospect. That business must be cleared up" (Emphasis in the original) The German historian Andreas Hillgruber commented that in 1939 the rampant anti-Polish feelings in the German Army officer corps served to bind the military together with Hitler in supporting Fall Weiss in a way that Fall Grün did not. The officers who had willing to consider taking part in a putsch in 1938 loyally rallied to the Nazi regime in 1939 when faced with the prospect of war with Poland. Likewise, the Catholic Bishop Galen delivered a sermon calling the war against Poland a struggle to "win a peace of freedom and justice for our nation".

This nevertheless marked an important turning point. In 1938, the plan had been for the army, led by Halder and if possible Brauchitsch, to depose Hitler. This was now impossible, and a conspiratorial organisation was to be formed in the army and civil service instead.

The opposition again urged Britain and France to stand up to Hitler: Halder met secretly with the British Ambassador Sir Nevile Henderson to urge resistance. The plan was again to stage a coup at the moment Hitler moved to declare war. However, although Britain and France were now prepared to go to war over Poland, as war approached, Halder lost his nerve. Schacht, Gisevius and Canaris developed a plan to confront Brauchitsch and Halder and demand that they depose Hitler and prevent war, but nothing came of this. When Hitler invaded Poland on 1 September, the conspirators were unable to act.

==== Outbreak of war ====
The outbreak of war made the further mobilization of resistance in the army more difficult. Halder continued to vacillate. In late 1939 and early 1940 he opposed Hitler's plans to attack France, and kept in touch with the opposition through General Carl-Heinrich von Stülpnagel, an active oppositionist. Talk of a coup again began to circulate, and for the first time the idea of killing Hitler with a bomb was taken up by the more determined members of the resistance circles, such as Oster and Erich Kordt, who declared himself willing to do the deed. At the army headquarters at Zossen, south of Berlin, a group of officers called Action Group Zossen was also planning a coup.

When in November 1939 it seemed that Hitler was about to order an immediate attack in the west, the conspirators persuaded General Wilhelm Ritter von Leeb, commander of Army Group C on the Belgian border, to support a planned coup if Hitler gave such an order. At the same time Oster warned the Dutch and the Belgians that Hitler was about to attack them—his warnings were not believed. But when Hitler postponed the attack until 1940, the conspiracy again lost momentum, and Halder formed the view that the German people would not accept a coup. Again, the chance was lost.

With Poland overrun but France and the Low Countries yet to be attacked, the German Resistance sought the Pope's assistance in preparations for a coup to oust Hitler. In the winter of 1939/40, the Bavarian lawyer and reserve 'Abwehr' officer Josef Müller, acting as an emissary for the military opposition centered around General Franz Halder, contacted Monsignore Ludwig Kaas, the exiled leader of the German Catholic Zentrum party, in Rome, hoping to use the Pope as an intermediary to contact the British. Kaas put Müller in contact with Father Robert Leiber, who personally asked the Pope to relay the information about the German resistance to the British.

The Vatican considered Müller to be a representative of Colonel-General von Beck and agreed to offer the machinery for mediation. Oster, Wilhelm Canaris and Hans von Dohnányi, backed by Beck, told Müller to ask Pius to ascertain whether the British would enter negotiations with the German opposition which wanted to overthrow Hitler. The British agreed to negotiate, provided the Vatican could vouch for the opposition's representative. Pius, communicating with Britain's Francis d'Arcy Osborne, channelled communications back and forth in secrecy. The Vatican agreed to send a letter outlining the bases for peace with England and the participation of the Pope was used to try to persuade senior German Generals Halder and Brauchitsch to act against Hitler. Negotiations were tense, with a Western offensive expected, and on the basis that substantive negotiations could only follow the replacement of the Hitler regime. Pius, without offering endorsement, advised Osbourne on 11 January 1940 that the German opposition had said that a German offensive was planned for February, but that this could be averted if the German generals could be assured of peace with Britain, and not on punitive terms. If this could be assured, then they were willing to move to replace Hitler. The British government had doubts as to the capacity of the conspirators. On 7 February, the Pope updated Osbourne that the opposition wanted to replace the Nazi regime with a democratic federation, but hoped to retain Austria and the Sudetenland. The British government was non-committal, and said that while the federal model was of interest, the promises and sources of the opposition were too vague. Nevertheless, the resistance were encouraged by the talks, and Müller told his contact that a coup would occur in February. Pius appeared to continue to hope for a coup in Germany into March 1940.

Following the Fall of France, peace overtures continued to emanate from the Vatican as well as Sweden and the United States, to which Churchill responded resolutely that Germany would first have to free its conquered territories. The negotiations ultimately proved fruitless. Hitler's swift victories over France and the Low Countries deflated the will of the German military to resist Hitler. Müller was arrested during the Nazis' first raid on Military Intelligence in 1943. He spent the rest of the war in concentration camps, ending up at Dachau.

The failed plots of 1938 and 1939 showed both the strength and weakness of the officer corps as potential leaders of a resistance movement. Its strength was its loyalty and solidarity. As Istvan Deak noted: "Officers, especially of the highest ranks, had been discussing, some as early as 1934 ... the possibility of deposing or even assassinating Hitler. Yet it seems that not a single one was betrayed by a comrade-in-arms to the Gestapo." Remarkably, in over two years of plotting, this widespread and loosely structured conspiracy was never detected. One explanation is that at this time Himmler was still preoccupied with the traditional enemies of the Nazis, the SPD and the KPD (and, of course, the Jews), and did not suspect that the real centre of opposition was within the state itself. Another factor was Canaris' success in shielding the plotters, particularly Oster, from suspicion.

The corresponding weakness of the officer corps was its conception of loyalty to the state and its aversion to mutiny. This explains the vacillations of Halder, who could never quite bring himself to take the decisive step. Halder hated Hitler, and believed that the Nazis were leading Germany to catastrophe. He was shocked and disgusted by the behaviour of the SS in occupied Poland, but gave no support to his senior officer there, General Johannes Blaskowitz, when the latter officially protested to Hitler about the atrocities against the Poles and the Jews. In 1938 and again in 1939, he lost his nerve and could not give the order to strike against Hitler. This was even more true of Brauchitsch, who knew of the conspiracies and assured Halder that he agreed with their objectives, but would not take any action to support them.

The outbreak of war served to rally the German people around the Hitler regime, and the sweeping early successes of the German Army—occupying Poland in 1939, Denmark and Norway in April 1940, and swiftly defeating France in May and June 1940, stilled virtually all opposition to the regime. The opposition to Hitler within the Army was left isolated and apparently discredited, since the much-feared war with the western powers had apparently been won by Germany within a year and at little cost. This mood continued well into 1941, although beneath the surface popular discontent at mounting economic hardship was rising.

There was very little resistance within the SS, two notable examples are SS-Obersturmführer Heinz Heydrich, brother to Reinhard Heydrich who helped at least two Jews escape and SS-Sturmbannführer Konrad Morgen who used his position as an SS Investigating Judge and Reich Police Official to hinder the work of the SS by investigating them for murder and corruption.

=== Youth resistance ===
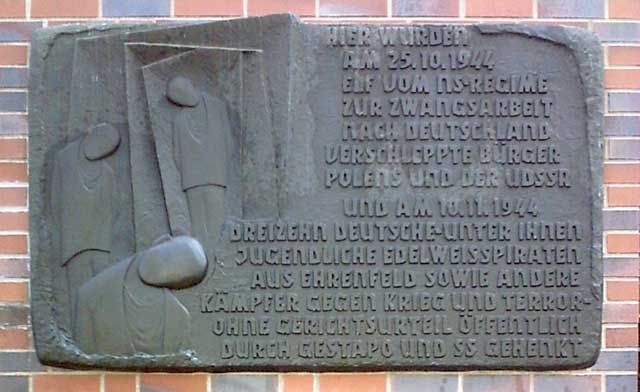
Memorial to the "Edelweisspiraten" youth group, six of whom were hanged in Cologne in 1944

Nazism had a powerful appeal to German youth, particularly middle-class youth, and German universities were strongholds of Nazism even before Hitler came to power. The Hitler Youth sought to mobilise all young Germans behind the regime, and apart from stubborn resistance in some rural Catholic areas, was generally successful in the first period of Nazi rule. After about 1938, however, persistent alienation among some sections of German youth began to appear. This rarely took the form of overt political opposition—the White Rose group was a striking exception, but was striking mainly for its uniqueness. Much more common was what would now be called "dropping out"—a passive refusal to take part in official youth culture and a search for alternatives. Although none of the unofficial youth groups amounted to a serious threat to the Nazi regime, and although they provided no aid or comfort to those groups within the German elite who were actively plotting against Hitler, they do serve to show that there were currents of opposition at other levels of German society.

Examples were the so-called Edelweisspiraten ("Edelweiss Pirates"), a loose network of working-class youth groups in a number of cities, who held unauthorised meetings and engaged in street fights with the Hitler Youth; the Meuten group in Leipzig, a more politicised group with links to the KPD underground, which had more than a thousand members in the late 1930s; and, most notably, the Swingjugend, middle-class youth who met in secret clubs in Berlin and most other large cities to listen to swing, jazz and other music deemed "degenerate" by the Nazi authorities. This movement, which involved distinctive forms of dress and gradually become more consciously political, became so popular that it provoked a crackdown: in 1941 Himmler ordered the arrest of Swing activists and had some sent to concentration camps.

In October 1944, as the American and British armies approached the western borders of Germany, there was a serious outbreak of disorder in the bomb-ravaged city of Cologne, which had been largely evacuated. The Edelweisspiraten linked up with gangs of deserters, escaped prisoners and foreign workers, and the underground KPD network, to engage in looting and sabotage, and the assassination of Gestapo and Nazi Party officials. Explosives were stolen with the objective of blowing up the Gestapo headquarters. Himmler, fearing the resistance would spread to other cities as the Allied armies advanced into Germany, ordered a savage crackdown, and for days gunbattles raged in the ruined streets of Cologne. More than 200 people were arrested and dozens were hanged in public, among them six teenaged Edelweisspiraten, including Bartholomäus Schink.

== Attitudes toward the Allies ==
The various groups of German resistance against the Nazi government had different attitudes to the Allies. The most visible resistance group of the July 20 plot considered making peace with the Western Allies while continuing the war with the Soviet Union. Some of its members were also involved in atrocities against civilians during the war. The token representative of the July 20 Group, Claus von Stauffenberg, wrote about his support towards German "colonization" of Poland a few years earlier.

Many postwar German commentators blamed the Allies for having isolated the resistance with their demand of unconditional surrender, while ignoring that the resistance offered unrealistic demands towards the Allies. While English historians too have criticized the unconditional surrender, most of them agree that it had no real impact on the outcome of the war. Prior to the formulation of unconditional surrender by the Allies, the peace demands sent from the German resistance were hardly satisfactory; for example in 1941 a proposal by Goerdeler demanded borders of 1914 with France, Belgium and Poland, as well as acceptance of annexation of Austria and Sudetenland. As late as 1944, members of the 20 July Plot were hoping for favorable terms that included maintaining some territorial gains.

While German popular memory and public discourse portrays the resistance as isolated due to demand of unconditional surrender, in reality its isolation was due to unrealistic expectations of what the Allies would accept; while German commentators write that the resistance tried "to save that which remained to be saved", they omit the fact that it included a significant portion of territories conquered by Nazi Germany from its neighbours.

A SHAEF directive prohibited activities aimed at promoting German revolt against the Nazi regime.

The Allied doctrine of unconditional surrender meant that "... those Germans—and particularly those German generals—who might have been ready to throw Hitler over, and were able to do so, were discouraged from making the attempt by their inability to extract from the Allies any sort of assurance that such action would improve the treatment meted out to their country."

On 11 December 1944 the head of the OSS, William Donovan, sent U.S. President Roosevelt a telegraph message from Bern, warning him of the consequences that the knowledge of the Morgenthau Plan had had on German resistance; by showing them that the enemy planned the enslavement of Germany it had welded together ordinary Germans and the regime; the Germans continue to fight because they are convinced that defeat will bring nothing but oppression and exploitation. The message was a translation of a recent article in the Neue Zürcher Zeitung.

So far, the Allies have not offered the opposition any serious encouragement. On the contrary, they have again and again welded together the people and the Nazis by statements published, either out of indifference or with a purpose. To take a recent example, the Morgenthau plan gave Dr. Goebbels the best possible chance. He was able to prove to his countrymen, in black and white, that the enemy planned the enslavement of Germany. The conviction that Germany had nothing to expect from defeat but oppression and exploitation still prevails, and that accounts for the fact that the Germans continue to fight. It is not a question of a regime, but of the homeland itself, and to save that, every German is bound to obey the call, whether he be Nazi or member of the opposition.

On 20 July 1945—the first anniversary of the failed attempt to kill Hitler—no mention whatsoever was made of the event. This was because reminding the German population of the fact that there had been active German resistance to Hitler would undermine the Allied efforts to instill a sense of collective guilt in the German populace (see also Denazification).

== See also ==
- Austrian resistance
- Italian resistance movement
- Political dissidence in the Empire of Japan
- List of Germans who resisted Nazism
- Schwarze Kapelle
