= Schwarze Kapelle =

Group of conspirators in the German army who plotted to overthrow Hitler

The Schwarze Kapelle ('black orchestra') was a term used by the Gestapo to refer to a group of conspirators in Nazi Germany, including many senior officers in the Wehrmacht, who plotted to overthrow Adolf Hitler. Unlike the Rote Kapelle (red orchestra), the name given by the Gestapo to the Soviet spy network in the Third Reich, many members of the Schwarze Kapelle were of aristocratic background, felt contempt for the ideology of the Nazi Party, and were politically close to the Western Allies.

== Membership ==
Schwarze Kapelle claimed members throughout the German military and government. Those believed to have been active with the organisation included:

- Admiral Wilhelm Canaris (1887–1945), ranking member, the head of German military intelligence, the Abwehr
- Generalmajor Hans Oster 1887–1945, deputy head of the Abwehr
- Generalmajor Henning von Tresckow (1901–1944), chief of operations at the HQ of Günther von Kluge's Army Group Centre
- General Erich Fellgiebel (1886–1944), General of the Communications Troops
- Generaloberst Ludwig Beck (1880–1944), the Chief of the General Staff, the OKH 1934–1938
- Field Marshal Erwin von Witzleben (1881–1944), Generalfeldmarschall in line to head all German armies after the coup
- General Erich Hoepner (1886–1944), Wehrmacht commander in Poland, France, and Soviet Union in WWII
- Colonel Claus Schenk Graf von Stauffenberg (1907–1944), member of a distinguished German military family, and perpetrator of the 20 July plot that almost killed Hitler.
- General Carl-Heinrich von Stülpnagel (1886–1944), military commander of the Wehrmacht in Paris
- Fabian von Schlabrendorff (1907–1980), adjutant to General Henning von Tresckow
- General Friedrich Olbricht (1888–1944), Chief of the Armed Forces Replacement Office
- Erich Kordt (1903–1969), head of German Foreign Office's Ministerial Bureau
- Ulrich von Hassell (1881–1944), German ambassador in Rome 1932–1938
- Carl Friedrich Goerdeler (1884–1945), mayor of Leipzig 1930–1937
- Dietrich Bonhoeffer (1906–1945), Lutheran pastor and author
- Generaloberst Franz Halder (1884–1972), the Chief of the Army General Staff (part of OKH) 1938–1942
- Josef Müller (1898–1979), Christian Social Union in Bavaria politician and Munich attorney, confidante of Pope Pius XII
- Hans von Dohnanyi (1902–1945), German jurist, head of Abwehr's Office of Political Affairs 1939–1943
- Hans Bernd Gisevius (1904–1974), a diplomat and intelligence officer
- Colonel Helmuth Groscurth (1899–1943), Chief of Abwehr Department II and staff officer
- Generalmajor Erwin von Lahousen (1897–1955), Chief of Abwehr Section II
- Helmuth James Graf von Moltke (1907–1945), great-grandnephew of a hero of the Franco-Prussian War of 1870
- Peter Yorck von Wartenburg (1904–1944), lawyer, founding member of the Kreisau Circle
- Adam von Trott zu Solz (1909–1944), a descendant on his mother's side of the first chief justice of the USA
- Ernst von Weizsäcker (1882–1950), permanent head of the German foreign office from 1938 to 1943
- Hasso von Etzdorf (1900–1989), Foreign Office Liaison to the OKH 1939–1944

== Activities ==
The members of Schwarze Kapelle included many in the higher echelons of the Wehrmacht (the German army) and Abwehr (military intelligence). Drawn heavily from the aristocracy, they feared Hitler's policies would ruin their country and hoped overthrowing the Nazi Party would preserve their vision of Germany. Members utilized the Abwehr, headed by top-ranking conspirator Admiral Wilhelm Canaris, to regularly communicate with their counterparts in Britain, other Allied nations, and various neutrals.

Elements of the Schwarze Kapelle began making overtures to Britain before war broke out and Hitler could have been easily ousted or killed. British officials asserted they would not interfere with German internal affairs at that time. Many hard feelings remained among them from the First World War, exacerbated by Hitler's occupation of the Germanic Sudetenland in Czechoslovakia six months after the Munich Agreement. Moreover, Britain's covert apparatus had been burned in the Venlo Incident, losing two SIS (MI6) officers – including Sigismund Payne Best, who had extensive knowledge of British espionage on the continent – to supposed "discontented conservatives" who were actually German SD counterintelligence operatives.

Although Hitler had built Germany into the world's most dominant power, the conspirators were afraid his hubris would eventually bring harm to their Fatherland. Allied officials shied from any suggestions of a negotiated peace, refusing to recognize German wartime gains. Many were also reluctant to accept the credibility of the Schwarze Kapelle, believing it to be a front for the Gestapo. Thus the Allies encouraged its members to act but were not willing to promise anything in return. This reticence was to significantly hamper the German opposition to Hitler throughout the entire war.

By September 1938 the Schwarze Kapelle had devised plans for a coup to take place whenever the Munich Agreement was abrogated, as they anticipated Hitler would. The plotters believed Britain would deny Germany the Sudetenland, Germany would start a war it was sure to lose, which they sought to avoid. When Chamberlain stalled for time so that Britain could rearm, Germany had a free hand, there was no invasion, and the coup plans evaporated. Had the coup succeeded, Hitler was to have been shot "resisting arrest." With a successful annexation of the Sudetenland Hitler instead rose to his highest esteem yet; under the circumstances, no coup could possibly win the support of the German military, let alone the German people. The conspirator in charge of the plot, Chief of Staff of the Army High Command (OKH) Franz Halder, called it off.

The Schwarz Kapelle's plans for a provisional government were reconsidered a year later, in October–November 1939, when Hitler planned a 12 November autumn attack through the neutral Low Countries into France. Many on the General Staff thought it would be a military disaster at that time of year. Other high-ranking officers had been outraged at the barbarities being reported out of Poland. Once again Halder was in charge. After a meeting between Commander-in-Chief Field Marshal Walther von Brauchitsch and Hitler at the very time of the planned coup, 13:30 on 5 November 1939, Halder misunderstood a reference Hitler made to the OKH headquarters as the "spirit of Zossen" and feared the conspirators had been found out. He called off the plan and had all documents burned.

There had been enough support from high-level military commanders during both the 1938 and 1939 plots that the chief conspirator, Abwehr head Admiral Canaris, was able to propose preventing the war to Britain as an outcome of the first, and surrender in the second. The British, however, were never really on board either time, undermining the conspirators' confidence in pursuing treason each time. Further, the plotters were never confident that Germany would be treated fairly by Britain in any successful coup, as opposed to 1919 and Versailles. High ranking conspirators in the Wehrmacht, who were central to any coup attempt, also feared they would be seen as traitors if Germany did not receive favorable terms after replacing Hitler.

Following the spectacular success of Hitler's invasion plan for France, both German public opinion and support of and in the German military solidified behind the Führer. Still, the Schwarz Kapelle maintained its efforts to overthrow Hitler and seek a negotiated peace with its enemies. The disastrous September 1941 stall and subsequent total failure of Hitler's plan to invade and conquer the Soviet Union, Operation Barbarossa, renewed the conspirator's hopes. Fallow times, however, dominated their dealings until 1943.

When Roosevelt announced at the Casablanca Conference in January 1943 that the Allies would accept nothing less than unconditional surrender, an approving Churchill and others realized this would force the Germans to fight "like rats." Canaris also grasped this demand would probably doom his efforts to recruit supporters among the German generals.

On 13 March 1943, Colonel Henning von Tresckow had his adjutant, Fabian von Schlabrendorff, place a time bomb aboard Hitler's plane on 13 March 1943, right after the disaster of Stalingrad, but it failed to go off, despite their testing and retesting the fuses.

Throughout the rest of 1943 and into the first half of 1944 the Allies continued their gains in the Mediterranean Theatre and massed men and materiel for a European invasion along the French channel coastline. The conspirators began to organize for another attempt to assassinate Hitler and take over both German civil government and its military.

=== The von Stauffenberg bomb attempt and aftermath ===
By the summer of 1944 unrest in the German military and diplomatic ranks was widespread. The Allied landing at Normandy in June and failed German response raised the specter of doom among the upper ranks even of German field marshals. The Schwarze Kapelle responded by organizing a deadly attempt on Hitler's life at his Wolf's Lair compound in East Prussia. Undertaken by an aristocratic member of a hereditarily military family, Colonel Claus von Stauffenberg, the 20 July Plot nearly succeeded. Although surrounded by fatalities from the bomb Hitler escaped with a concussion and various injuries.

In the aftermath he was determined to get vengeance upon the plotters. The Gestapo rounded up the members of the Schwarze Kapelle and many, many more it believed were either implicated in or sympathetic to it; according to its records it put 7,000 of them to death. Stauffenberg and three others were summarily shot that night. Most of the conspirators were put on trial in the Volksgerichtshof ('People's Court') between August 1944 to February 1945. Many were executed the day after their convictions by hanging from meat hooks at Plötzensee Prison. Architect of the 1943 bomb plot on Hitler's plane Fabian von Schlabrendorff only escaped death because an Allied bomb fell on the court as he was being led in, killing presiding officer Roland Freisler and destroying most of the court and investigation records.

So widespread was the terror and prosecution that even some of the highest ranking generals of the German military who had not been direct members of the Schwarze Kapelle but merely knew of the coup attempt in advance through them and supported it – such as Field Marshalls Erwin Rommel and Gunther von Kluge – were swept to their deaths. Von Kluge, Supreme Commander of German forces in the West, was deposed by Hitler on 16 August 1944, a day after he was suspected of seeking a surrender to the Allies, and took cyanide en route to Berlin to avoid hanging via the People's Court; Rommel, hero of the Desert Campaign, architect of Atlantic Wall, and the popular choice to replace Hitler, was forced to take cyanide by him to prevent retributions being taken against his family.

Admiral Canaris and his deputy, Hans Oster, the top two figures in German military intelligence, were not tried until February 1945, and not executed until 9 April 1945, when Germany's defeat was already certain. Their deaths were particularly grisly, by slow strangulation.

== See also ==
- Red Orchestra (espionage)

== Bibliography ==
- Brown, Anthony Cave (1975). Bodyguard of Lies. New York: Harper & Row. ISBN 978-0-06-010551-8.
- Shirer, William Lawrence (1960). The Rise and Fall of the Third Reich: A History of Nazi Germany. New York City: Simon & Schuster. ASIN B0766DKDLR. LCCN 60006729. OCLC 1286630. OL 5794925M. Wikidata Q138029595.
