= Helmuth Groscurth =

German army officer (1898–1943)

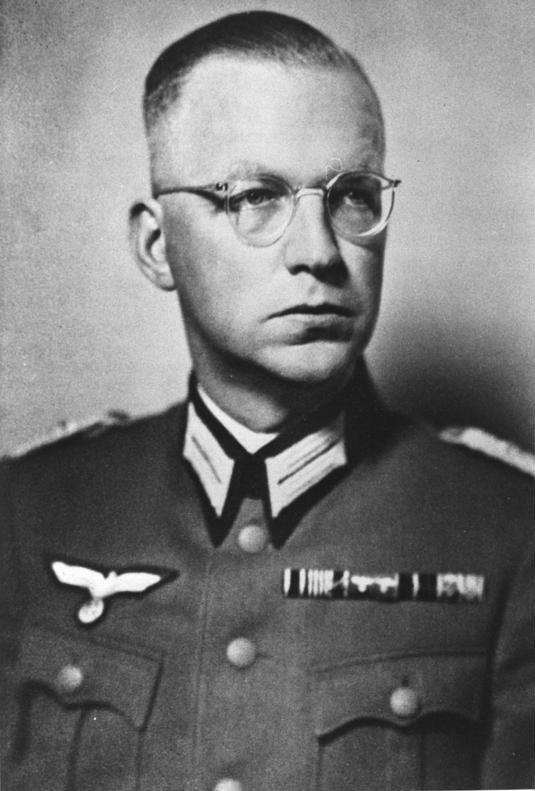
- Groscurth as an Oberstleutnant, 1941
- Born: 16 December 1898; Lüdenscheid, Germany
- Died: 7 April 1943 (aged 44); Frolovo, Soviet Union
- Military career
- Allegiance: German Empire; Weimar Republic; Nazi Germany
- Branch: German Army
- Service years: 1916–1920; 1924–1943
- Rank: Oberst
- Units: Abwehr; 11th Army Corps
- Commands: Abwehr-Abteilung II; Abteilung Heerwesen zbV (Abwehr)
- Conflicts: World War I; World War II; Sudetenland; Invasion of Poland; Battle of France; Operation Barbarossa; Battle of Stalingrad
- Awards: German Cross in Gold

Helmuth Groscurth (16 December 1898 – 7 April 1943) was a German staff and Abwehr officer in the Wehrmacht and a member of the German resistance. As an intelligence officer he was an early proponent of the Brandenburgers, commanded unconventional warfare operations in the Sudetenland, and was an active conspirator against Hitler's agenda. He was later reassigned to the regular army following his criticism of war crimes committed by German forces in Poland. After commanding an infantry battalion in the invasion of France he assumed a variety of staff roles. He was involved in the events of the Bila Tserkva massacre where he attempted to avert the killing of Jewish children.

He ended his active service as Karl Strecker's Chief of Staff in the 11th Army Corps. He participated in the Battle of Stalingrad and helped draft the final message from the German forces trapped there. After the surrender he contracted typhus and died while in Soviet captivity. The recovery of his diaries and papers provided a significant source for historians researching the early resistance to Hitler within the German military.

== Early life ==
Groscurth was born in Lüdenscheid to German theologian and priest, Reinhard Groscurth. Groscurth was a devout Protestant and conservative nationalist. His older brother Reinhard, was a German lawyer who worked against corruption and Nazi influence in the Evangelical Church of Bremen. Groscurth joined the German 75th Infantry Regiment in 1916 and fought on the Western Front where he was severely wounded and taken as a POW by the British the following year. After the war he transferred to the Reichswehr and then left the military to pursue studies in agriculture. He rejoined the Reichswehr in 1924 and in 1929 was appointed as the adjunct to Erwin von Witzleben, a fellow anti-Hitler conspirator who would go on to be executed for his participation in the 20 July plot.

== Military intelligence officer ==
He was recruited into the Abwehr in 1935, eventually becoming an active conspirator in the extensive network of officers within military intelligence who were part of the German resistance under the direction of Admiral Wilhelm Canaris. In 1938, Canaris assigned Groscurth, now a Major, to head the Abwehr II, the "Minorities and Sabotage" section of the military intelligence service responsible for unconventional warfare in foreign countries. Canaris feared the growing power of the SS in such operations, particularly its influence over Konrad Henlein, and so he sent Groscurth to the Sudetenland, border region of Czechoslovakia, in the run up to the planned annexation of the Sudetenland to prepare a pro-German fifth column under the control of the Abwehr. His mission included strengthening moderate ethnic Germans in the area in the hope that a negotiated solution could be found and a war avoided. He collected intelligence on Czechoslovak defenses, planted secret arms dumps, and trained potential insurgents in sabotage. These activities angered Reinhard Heydrich and the SD, who were working to aggravate tensions in order to justify an invasion.

As a part of the larger strategy of taking the Sudetenland, Hitler wanted the British to be as distracted as possible when Germany forced the issue. To this end, Canaris and Groscurth traveled to Baghdad for a secret meeting with Amin al-Husseini, the Grand Mufti of Jerusalem. Afterward Groscurth coordinated a weapons smuggling operation on behalf of Arab forces fighting the British in the Arab revolt in Palestine. Groscurth's plan set up an underground route for German weapons to be sent by sea to Lebanon and then loaded onto local Arab fishing boats, which ferried the weapons to Palestine.

Despite some successes by Abwehr elements, Henlein was greatly impressed with Hitler's victory in the Austrian Anschluss and decided to side with the radicals backed by Heydrich. Once the Germans occupied the Sudetenland, Heydrich turned on Henlein by undermining his power and murdering or imprisoning many of his friends and allies. Terrified, Henlein's wife begged Groscurth to protect them from the SS, which Groscurth and the Abwehr tried to do, with limited success. Although Henlein was not killed outright, he was removed from the proximity of power and was only allowed to live because of the personal relationship he had built with Hitler. After his assignment in the Sudetenland, Gorscurth successfully advocated on behalf of his subordinate Theodor von Hippel's proposal to form the Brandenburgers within Abwehr II. Groscurth was replaced by Erwin von Lahousen and promoted to be the chief of Abteilung Heerwesen zbV, a newly created liaison unit between the Abwehr and the OKH. The new position proved to be key in his coordination of anti-Nazi activities between military intelligence, the regular army, and the German diplomatic corps.

=== Chief of Abteilung Heerwesen zbV ===
Canaris used Groscurth's new unit as a way of giving intelligence directly to senior army commanders, with the intention of combating the growing influence of the SS and its expanding intelligence capabilities. Groscurth's new duties made him extremely well-informed and connected. He used his position and the contacts that came with it to further the resistance to Hitler and the SS, including becoming one of the primary co-ordinators between the various elements of the Oster conspiracy. On the behalf of Canaris, he acted as the handler for Josef Müller's covert mission to the Vatican to secure the Pope's support for the overthrow of Hitler. He went so far as to secure explosives for an assassination attempt. During the missions Groscurth took extensive notes for operational reference and to provide evidence of resistance to Hitler for posterity if they failed. Additionally, Groscurth was active in maintaining communications between the anti-Hitler elements in Germany and the Chamberlain government in Britain. The communications attempted to create a deal with the British to ensure the Allies would not attack Germany if Hitler could be deposed. After Himmler provoked outrage in the Wehrmacht with his directive that SS men should breed as many children of "good blood" as possible, regardless of the marital status of the mother, Groscurth actively and publicly campaigned to have the order rescinded.

In December 1939, Groscurth traveled throughout the Western Front during the Phoney War, disseminating reports and memorandums of atrocities committed during the invasion of Poland passed to him by a fellow objector Johannes Blaskowitz in an attempt to convince commanders there to act against Hitler. He visited Wilhelm Ritter von Leeb, Erwin von Witzleben, Gerd von Rundstedt, and Fedor von Bock, but only Leeb was willing to take any official action by authoring a complaint to Hitler. That overall effort proved to be unsuccessful and, along with his open criticism of SS policies, created pressure on the Chief of the Army Walther von Brauchitsch from Himmler and other sources, leading to Groscurth's eventual dismissal from military intelligence by January 1940. He was then reassigned to command an infantry battalion in the West, where he took part in the invasion of France.

== Army staff officer ==
After France he became the General Staff Officer for the 295th Infantry Division. In August 1941, Groscurth attempted to prevent the execution of approximately 90 Jewish children in Bila Tserkva. Groscurth became aware of the children's situation after several Heer soldiers confronted the SS Sergeant in charge of guarding a church locked full of crying children who had been recently orphaned by the execution of their parents. After being turned away by the SS, the soldiers went to their chaplains, who in turn went to Groscurth.

On 8 August 1941, Groscurth reported his concerns to the Chief of the General Staff of Army Group South, General Georg von Sodenstern. Although Sodenstern took his report, he told Groscurth that he was unable to intervene. Groscurth continued his objection all the way to Field Marshal Walther von Reichenau at a meeting in the field commander's office on 21 August 1941. Reichenau echoed the position of the local SS Feldkommandant(de), Josef Riedl, who "regarded the extermination of Jewish women and children as absolutely necessary." Also present was Paul Blobel, the head of Einsatzgruppe C, who responded by saying any commanders in the army who objected should be made to carry out the executions themselves. Some reports assert that Groscurth was then beaten although Groscurth did not mention that in his own report on the matter. The next day, the SS took the children out to a mass grave where they were all shot by the Ukrainian auxiliaries. To the displeasure of Reichenau, Groscurth filed an official report with the army, protesting the killings as inhumane and demoralizing for the army troops in the vicinity, calling it "a horror". The criticisms that Groscurth made in his report were, however, directed exclusively at the failure by local commanders to carry out such mistreatment and killing of children away from German troops, some of whom had already been disturbed by the children's "whimpering". Groscurth's report did not officially object to the children's plight itself but the inefficiency of the process and the potential detrimental effect on the fighting spirit of nearby German soldiers.

Despite his public rebuke, Groscurth was promoted to colonel and appointed Chief of the General Staff for XI Army Corps, commanded by Karl Strecker, which was subsequently committed to the Battle of Stalingrad. As the situation of the 6th Army in Stalingrad deteriorated, Groscurth again became convinced that the only way to avoid calamity was to remove Hitler. To that end, he asked a friend, Major Alred von Waldersee, to travel to Berlin and contact officers who might listen and act. Waldersee first met with Friedrich Olbricht and Ludwig Beck. Beck advised Waldersee to travel to see Carl-Heinrich von Stülpnagel in Paris as well as solicit Gerd von Rundstedt for support. His efforts proved fruitless. Groscurth and Strecker were the last senior German officers trapped in the city to surrender their command and, on the morning of 2 February, drafting the final communication sent by the 6th Army and signing it "Long Live Germany!" That was an intentional deviation from the standard "Heil Hitler," although the signal was changed before it reached Hitler himself, to include a "Long live the Führer!" Strecker, Groscurth and the rest of the 6th Army were taken as prisoners-of-war and marched to labour camps in the Soviet Union. Groscurth was placed in an officer's prison camp in Frolovo, where he later died of typhus.

== Legacy ==
Groscurth was one of the first Army officers to join the resistance and became known, along with Oster, as the "soul of the Resistance within the Abwehr" since the summer of 1938. After the war Groscurth's diary was published, revealing his role as one of the key members of the Oster Conspiracy. He was also one of the authors of a secret memorandum written in October 1939 titled, "An imminent disaster," with diplomats Hasso von Etzdorf and Erich Kordt, outlining a potential coup against Hitler. His diaries and the documents that he saved gave important insights for historians into the workings of the early resistance to Hitler by conservatives and military officers, as well as the process of the eventual submission of the Wehrmacht to Nazi policies and SS atrocities. His papers from handling Müller's secret activities in Rome also provided a substantial body of evidence on the correspondence between the German resistance, the British government, and the Vatican. Historian Friedrich Hiller von Gaertringen described Groscurth as "a determined opponent of Nazism".

== See also ==
- Oster conspiracy
- Schwarze Kapelle
- List of Germans who resisted Nazism
