= Henning von Tresckow =

German general and anti-Hitler conspirator (1901–1944)

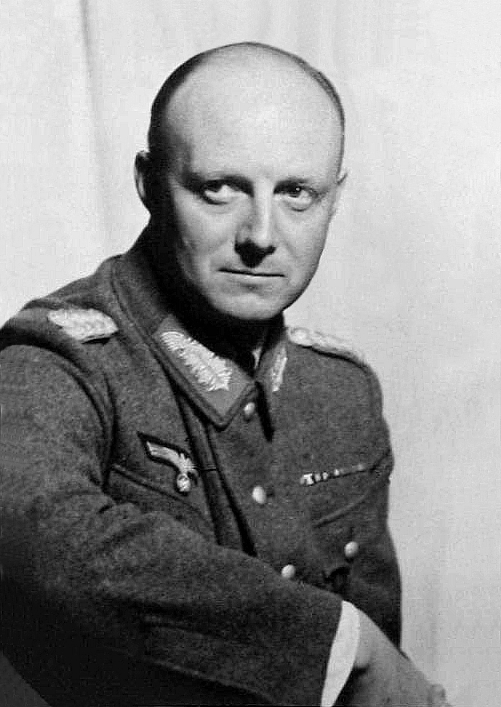
- Tresckow in 1944
- Born: Hermann Henning Karl Robert von Tresckow; 10 January 1901; Magdeburg, Province of Saxony, Kingdom of Prussia, German Empire
- Died: 21 July 1944 (aged 43); Królowy Most, Bezirk Białystok, German-occupied Poland
- Spouse: Erika von Falkenhayn (m. 1926)
- Relatives: Erich von Falkenhayn (father-in-law)
- Military career
- Allegiance: German Empire; Weimar Republic; Nazi Germany; German resistance to Nazism
- Branch: German Army
- Service years: 1917–1920; 1926–1944
- Rank: Generalmajor
- Commands: Chief of Staff of the 2nd Army, commander of the 1st Regiment of Foot Guards
- Conflicts: World War I: World War II; Battle of France; Eastern Front; Operation Barbarossa; Battle of the Dnieper; 20 July plot
- Other work: Drafted the Valkyrie plan for the 20 July plot

Henning Hermann Karl Robert von Tresckow (German: [ˈhɛ.nɪŋ fɔn ˈtʁeːs.koː]; 10 January 1901 – 21 July 1944) was a German military officer with the rank of major general in the German Army during the Nazi era, who helped organize German resistance against Adolf Hitler. He attempted to assassinate Hitler on 13 March 1943 and drafted the Valkyrie plan for a coup against the German government. He was described by the Gestapo as the "prime mover" behind the plot of 20 July 1944 to assassinate Hitler. He died by suicide at Królowy Most on the Eastern Front upon learning of the plot's failure.

== Early life ==
Tresckow was born in Magdeburg into a noble family from the Brandenburg region of Prussia with 300 years of military tradition that provided the Prussian Army with 21 generals. His father, Leopold Hans Heinrich Eugen Hermann von Tresckow, later a cavalry general, had been present at Kaiser Wilhelm I's coronation as the emperor of new German Empire at Versailles in 1871. His mother, Marie-Agnes, was the youngest daughter of Count Robert von Zedlitz-Trützschler, a Prussian Minister of Education.

He received most of his early education from tutors on his family's remote rural estate; from 1913 to 1917, he was a student at the gymnasium in the town of Goslar. He joined the 1st Regiment of Foot Guards as an officer cadet aged 16 and became the youngest lieutenant in the Army in June 1918. In the Second Battle of the Marne, he earned the Iron Cross 2nd class for outstanding courage and independent action against the enemy. At that time Count Siegfried von Eulenberg, the commander of the 1st Regiment of Foot Guards, predicted that "You, Tresckow, will either become chief of the General Staff or die on the scaffold as a rebel."

== Career ==
The young Henning von Tresckow

After World War I, Tresckow stayed with the famed Infantry Regiment 9 Potsdam and took part in the suppression of the Spartacist movement in January 1919, but resigned from the Weimar Republic Reichswehr Army in 1920 in order to study law and economics. He worked in a banking house and embarked on a world journey visiting Britain, France, Brazil and the eastern United States in 1924 before he had to abandon it to take care of family possessions back home. Like members of many prominent Prussian families, Tresckow married into another family with long-standing military traditions. In 1926, he married Erika von Falkenhayn, only daughter of Erich von Falkenhayn, the chief of the General Staff from 1914 to 1916, and returned to military service, being sponsored by Field Marshal Paul von Hindenburg. Nevertheless, he was not a typical Prussian officer. He wore his uniform only when it was absolutely required and disliked the regimentation of army life. He liked to recite Rainer Maria Rilke, and spoke several languages, including English and French.

In 1934, Tresckow began General Staff training at the War Academy and graduated as the best of the class of 1936. He was assigned to the General Staff's 1st Department (Operations), where he worked in close contact with Generals Ludwig Beck, Werner von Fritsch, Adolf Heusinger and Erich von Manstein.

Later in 1939 and into 1940, he served as the second general staff officer of Army Group A under Gerd von Rundstedt and Erich von Manstein, culminating in the invasion of France in the spring of 1940. Tresckow played a role in the adoption of the Manstein Plan, which proved to be successful in the French campaign. Tresckow's former regimental comrade Rudolf Schmundt was Hitler's chief military aide, and it was through the Tresckow-Schmundt channel that Manstein's plan, after being rejected by Army High Command, was brought to Hitler's attention. He is also said to have worked on developing the Manstein Plan itself as Günther Blumentritt's deputy. After the fall of France, he did not share the euphoria that swept Germany and brought Hitler to the peak of his popularity. In October, he said in Paris to a secretary (the future wife of Alfred Jodl), "If Churchill can induce America to join in the war, we shall slowly but surely be crushed by material superiority. The most that will be left to us then will be the Electorate of Brandenburg, and I'll be chief of the palace guard."

From 1941 to 1943, he served under Field Marshal Fedor von Bock, his wife's cousin, and later Field Marshal Günther von Kluge as chief operations officer of the German Army Group Centre in Operation Barbarossa, the invasion of the Soviet Union. Subsequently, in October and November 1943, he served in combat as the commanding officer of Grenadier Regiment 442, defending the western bank of the Dnieper River in Ukraine. From December 1943 until his death in 1944, he served as Chief of Staff of the 2nd Army.

== Heuaktion ==
As Chief of Staff of the 2nd Army, Tresckow signed an order on 28 June 1944 carrying out a plan originally conceived by Himmler, to abduct supposedly unaccompanied Belarusian, Polish, and Ukrainian children in the so-called Heuaktion (Hay Action). Between 40,000 and 50,000 children aged 10 to 14 were kidnapped for Nazi Germany's forced labour programme. The order read in part "In operations against gangs, any boys and girls taken between ages 10 and 13 who are physically healthy, and whose parents either cannot be located or who, as persons unable to work, are to be sent to the area earmarked for remaining families (the dregs are to be sent to the Reich)."

The kidnapped children were used as forced workers in the Todt Organisation, Junkers factories and in German handicrafts as part of an operation to "lower biological strength" of the enemies of Nazi Germany.

Kidnapping of children by Nazi Germany has been classified by the Nuremberg Tribunal as part of a systematic programme of genocide. Alfred Rosenberg, who also signed the documents for Heuaktion, was found guilty by the Nuremberg Tribunal, and his signing of the document was mentioned in the final verdict.

== Opposition to Adolf Hitler ==
Although initially supportive of Hitler because of his own opposition to the Treaty of Versailles, Tresckow was quickly disillusioned by 1934 by the events of the Night of the Long Knives (30 June to 2 July 1934) as well as its violence against the Jewish population.

In 1938, the Blomberg–Fritsch affair further strengthened his antipathy to the Nazis. He regarded the Kristallnacht, a state-sanctioned, nationwide pogrom of Jews, as personal humiliation and degradation of civilization.

He therefore sought out civilians and officers who opposed Hitler, such as Erwin von Witzleben, who dissuaded Tresckow from resigning from the Army, arguing that they would be needed when the day of reckoning came. By the summer of 1939, he told Fabian von Schlabrendorff that "both duty and honor demand from us that we should do our best to bring about the downfall of Hitler and National Socialism to save Germany and Europe from barbarism." In the campaign against the Soviet Union, Tresckow resumed his resistance activities with renewed urgency. He was appalled by the Commissar Order, of which he said:

Remember this moment. If we don't convince the field marshal (Fedor von Bock) to fly to Hitler at once and have these orders (Commissar Order) canceled, the German people will be burdened with a guilt the world will not forget in a hundred years. This guilt will fall not only on Hitler, Himmler, Göring, and their comrades but on you and me, your wife and mine, your children and mine, that woman crossing the street, and those children over there playing ball.

He was likewise incensed by the treatment of Russian prisoners of war, and in particular by the mass shootings of Jewish women and children by the Einsatzgruppen behind the lines. When Tresckow learned about the massacre of thousands of Jews at Borisov, he appealed passionately to Field Marshal Fedor von Bock: "Never may such a thing happen again! And so we must act now. We have the power in Russia!"

Army Group Centre staff included Lieutenant Colonel Georg Schulze-Büttger, Colonel Rudolf Christoph Freiherr von Gersdorff, Major Carl-Hans Graf von Hardenberg, Lieutenant Heinrich Graf von Lehndorff-Steinort, Lieutenant Fabian von Schlabrendorff, Lieutenant Philipp Freiherr von Boeselager and his brother Georg Freiherr von Boeselager, Lieutenant Colonel Hans-Alexander von Voss and Lieutenant Colonel Berndt von Kleist among others, many of them from Tresckow's old Infantry Regiment 9. The headquarters of Army Group Centre thus emerged as the new nerve center of Army resistance.

At the end of September 1941, Tresckow sent his special operations officer Schlabrendorff to Berlin to contact opposition groups and declare that the staff of Army Group Centre was "prepared to do anything." This approach, made at the height of German expansion and the nadir of anti-Hitler opposition, represented the first initiative to come from the front and from the Army, as Ulrich von Hassell noted in his diary. Schlabrendorff continued to serve as liaison between Army Group Centre and opposition circle around General Ludwig Beck, Carl Friedrich Goerdeler and Colonel Hans Oster, the deputy head of Abwehr (German military intelligence) who was involved in a 1938 coup attempt against Hitler (Oster Conspiracy). Oster's recruitment of General Friedrich Olbricht, head of the General Army Office headquarters, in 1942 linked this asset to Tresckow's resistance group in Army Group Centre, creating a viable coup apparatus.

== Plots against Hitler ==
It was decided that Tresckow's group would assassinate Hitler and thereby provide the 'spark' for the coup, which Olbricht would direct from Berlin. In late 1942, Olbricht indicated that he still needed about eight weeks to complete preparations for the coup. Shortly thereafter, Tresckow traveled to Berlin to discuss the few remaining questions and emphasize that time was running short. In the winter of 1943, Olbricht declared: "We are ready. The spark can now be set off." Tresckow assured the conspirators that he would take action at the first available opportunity.

It came on 13 March 1943, when Hitler finally visited troops on the Eastern Front at Smolensk after a few cancellations and postponements. Under the initial plan, a group of officers were to shoot Hitler collectively at a signal in the officers' mess during lunch but Kluge, commander of Army Group Centre, who had been informed about the plot, urged Tresckow not to carry it out saying, "For heaven's sake, don't do anything today! It's still too soon for that!" He argued that the German army and people were not ready to accept the coup and would not understand such an act. He also feared a civil war between the Army and SS, since Heinrich Himmler had canceled his visit and could not be killed at the same time.

Tresckow, however, had a backup plan. During the lunch in question, he asked Lieutenant Colonel Heinz Brandt, who was travelling with Hitler, whether he would be good enough to take a bottle of Cointreau to Colonel Helmuth Stieff (who was not yet a conspirator at that time) at Hitler's headquarters in East Prussia as a payment for a lost bet. Brandt readily agreed. The "Cointreau" was actually a bomb constructed of a British plastic explosive "Plastic C" placed into the casing of a British magnetic mine, with a timer consisting of a spring which would be gradually dissolved by acid. Before Hitler's Condor plane was to take off, Schlabrendorff activated the 30-minute fuse and handed the package to Brandt, who boarded Hitler's plane. After takeoff, a message was sent to the other Berlin conspirators by code that Operation Flash was under way, which they expected to take place around Minsk. Yet when Hitler landed safely at his East Prussian headquarters, it became obvious that the bomb had failed to detonate (the extremely low temperatures in the unheated luggage compartment probably prevented the fuse from working). The message of failure was quickly sent out and Schlabrendorff retrieved the package to prevent discovery of the plot.

A week later, on 21 March, Army Group Centre organised a display of Russian Army flags and weapons seized at the Eastern Front. It was exhibited at Zeughaus, military museum in Berlin, which Hitler was to visit on Heroes' Memorial Day with Himmler and Hermann Göring. Colonel Gersdorff volunteered to be the suicide bomber, intending to explode a bomb on his person near Hitler while serving as a tour guide. He had with him bombs with ten-minute fuses, knowing that Hitler was scheduled to be in the museum for 30 minutes. But at the last minute, just before Hitler was to arrive, the duration of his stay was reduced to just eight minutes as a security precaution. Hitler breezed through in two minutes. As a result, Gersdorff could not accomplish his mission, the assassination plan failed again, and he barely managed to get out and defuse the bombs.

Other plots similarly failed because of Hitler's irregular habits. Most importantly, they had no access to Hitler since he no longer visited the front, rarely visited Berlin and spent most of his time at the Wolf's Lair in East Prussia or the Berghof in Bavaria. Tresckow lacked the required clearance to enter either site and the extremely high security made any attempt impractical and unlikely to succeed. The elimination of Oster's group in April 1943 (his deputy Hans von Dohnanyi and Lutheran theologian Dietrich Bonhoeffer were arrested, and Oster was placed under house arrest) was a further setback.

Tresckow worked tirelessly to persuade army commanders such as Field Marshals Fedor von Bock, Günther von Kluge and Erich von Manstein to join in the conspiracy without much success. With unwitting help from Schmundt, he placed like-minded officers as their adjutants and staff officers to bring them closer to the conspiracy. Kluge sympathised with the conspirators and at times seemed ready to act, only to become indecisive at critical moments. Others refused outright, Manstein declaring, "Prussian field marshals do not mutiny." Nonetheless, no-one reported their treasonable activities to the SS.

Erika and Henning von Tresckow

== Operation Valkyrie ==
Eventually, the conspirators came to rely more on the Reserve Army in Berlin and other districts to stage a coup against the German government. Olbricht now put forward a new strategy for staging a coup against Hitler. The Reserve Army had an operational plan called Operation Walküre (Valkyrie), which was to be used in the event that the disruption caused by the Allied bombing of German cities caused a breakdown in law and order, or an uprising by the millions of slave laborers from occupied countries now being used in German factories. Olbricht suggested that this plan could be used to mobilize the Reserve Army to take control of German cities, disarm the SS and arrest the Nazi leadership once Hitler had been assassinated. During August and September 1943, Tresckow took extended sick leave in Berlin to draft the "revised" Valkyrie plan with fine details and precise timetables. Revised orders and additional proclamations that would pin the blame for the uprising on the Nazi party were typed by Tresckow's wife, Erika, and his secretary, Countess Margarete von Oven, who wore gloves so as not to leave fingerprints. These 1943 papers were recovered by the Soviets after the war and finally published in 2007, showing Tresckow's central role in the conspiracy and the idealistic motivations of the resistance group at that time. Knowledge of the Jewish Holocaust was a major impetus for many officers involved.

But when Tresckow was assigned to command of a battalion on the Eastern Front in October 1943, he was no longer in position to actively plan or effect the coup. Even his promotion a month later to Chief of Staff of the Second Army did not bring him much closer. To gain access to Hitler, he proposed to his old comrade General Rudolf Schmundt, Hitler's chief adjutant and Army personnel chief, to create a new department of psychological and political warfare to evaluate data and make reports directly to the Führer. Schmundt, who was still well disposed toward his old friend but suspected that Tresckow disapproved of the Führer, quietly let the matter drop. Tresckow also applied to become General Adolf Heusinger's delegate in the Army High Command (OKH) during the latter's two-month leave, which would also give him access to Hitler's meetings, but Heusinger, who was earlier approached by conspirators, rejected it apparently for the same reason.

Colonel Claus Schenk Graf von Stauffenberg, who met Tresckow in August 1943 and worked together on revising Operation Valkyrie, took the responsibility for planning and implementing Hitler's assassination. By the time Stauffenberg was appointed Chief of Staff of the Reserve Army and was ready to carry out the assassination attempt, the Allies had already landed in Normandy. When Stauffenberg sent a message to Tresckow through Lehndorff to ask whether there was any point in making the attempt since there was no practical purpose to be served, Tresckow urged him not only to attempt the assassination but to go ahead with the coup in Berlin even if the assassination were to fail. He argued that there must be an overt act of German opposition to Hitler regardless of the consequences. He also told Philipp von Boeselager and Margarete von Oven that 16,000 people were being killed daily not as casualties of war but from being murdered by the Nazis, and Hitler had to be killed just to put an end to it. A few days before the coup attempt, Tresckow confided to a friend that "in all likelihood everything will go wrong". When asked whether the action was necessary nonetheless, he replied, "Yes, even so."

== Death ==
On 20 July, Stauffenberg placed a bomb (hidden in a briefcase) under a map table being used by Hitler and a group of military officers. The bomb was initially placed adjacent to Hitler, but was moved before its timed fuse expired. Four people were killed in the explosion, but Hitler received only minor injuries. The planned coup in Berlin was attempted but failed when it became clear that Hitler had survived. Stauffenberg was arrested and executed within hours.

When Tresckow heard that the assassination attempt had failed, he was located at the front in Królowy Most, near Białystok. To avoid the inevitable reprisals, he decided to die by suicide on 21 July. To protect the other conspirators and his family, Tresckow staged the appearance of a partisan attack, by firing his pistols before detonating a grenade below his chin.

His parting words to Schlabrendorff were:

The whole world will vilify us now, but I am still totally convinced that we did the right thing. Hitler is the archenemy not only of Germany but of the world. When, in few hours' time, I go before God to account for what I have done and left undone, I know I will be able to justify what I did in the struggle against Hitler. God promised Abraham that He would not destroy Sodom if only ten righteous men could be found in the city, and so I hope for our sake God will not destroy Germany. No one among us can complain about dying, for whoever joined our ranks put on the shirt of Nessus. A man's moral worth is established only at the point where he is ready to give his life in defense of his convictions.

Tresckow was buried in the family home in Wartenberg. When his connection to Operation Valkyrie was uncovered by the Nazis in August, his body was exhumed and taken to the crematorium in the Sachsenhausen concentration camp. His wife was arrested on 15 August, and her children taken away under the Nazi policy of Sippenhaft (shared family guilt); however, early in October she was released and survived the war.

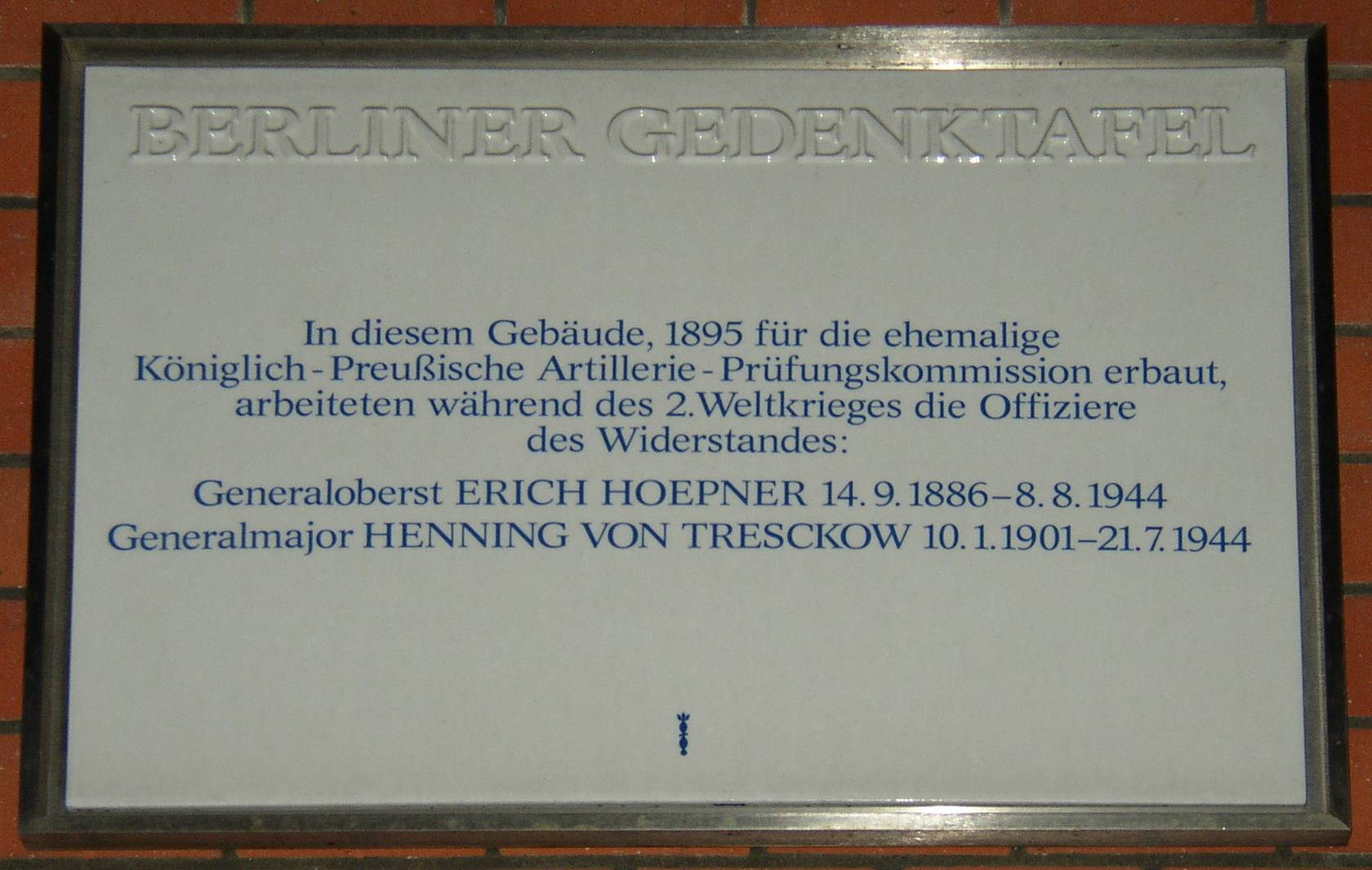
Memorial plaque for Erich Hoepner and Tresckow in the Bundeshaus, Berlin

== Personal life ==
In 1926, Tresckow married Erika von Falkenhayn, the daughter of Prussian general Erich von Falkenhayn and his wife, Ida (née Selkmann). General von Falkenhayn served as Prussian Minister of War during World War I as well as Chief of German General Staff. Tresckow and von Falkenhayn had four children, Mark, born 1927, Rüdiger, born 1928, Uta, born 1931 and Adelheid, born 1939.

After his suicide, his wife and daughters were arrested. His sons were already serving in the military. Mark would die in military service in 1945, almost a year after his father's suicide. The daughters were detained in a children's home in Bad Sachsa, Germany, together with several other children of the leaders of the 20 July plot.

== Portrayals in media ==
Tresckow has been portrayed by the following actors in film and television:

- David Wayne in the 1959 Alcoa-Goodyear Theatre television production "Operation Spark"
- Ulrich Tukur in the 2004 German television film Stauffenberg
- Kenneth Branagh in the 2008 American film Valkyrie

== Awards and decorations ==
- German Cross in Gold on 2 January 1943 as Oberst im Generalstab (in the General Staff) of Heeresgruppe Mitte

== See also ==
- Assassination attempts on Adolf Hitler
