= Oster conspiracy =

1938 proposed plan to overthrow Adolf Hitler

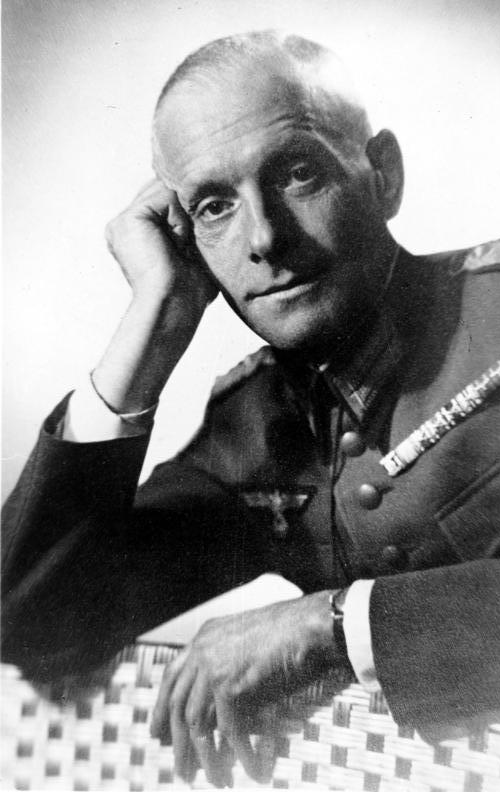
Hans Oster in 1939

The Oster Conspiracy of 1938, also called the September Conspiracy (German: Septemberverschwörung), was a proposed plan to overthrow German Führer Adolf Hitler and the Nazi regime if Germany went to war with Czechoslovakia over the Sudetenland. It was led by Oberstleutnant Hans Oster, deputy head of the Abwehr, and high-ranking conservatives within the Wehrmacht who opposed the regime for behavior that was threatening to bring Germany into a war that they believed it was not ready to fight. They planned to overthrow Hitler and the Nazi regime through a storming of the Reich Chancellery by forces loyal to the plot to take control of the government, who would either arrest or assassinate Hitler, and restore the Monarchy under Prince Wilhelm of Prussia, the grandson of Wilhelm II.

== Background ==
The plot was organised and developed by then Oberstleutnant Hans Oster and Major Helmuth Groscurth of the Abwehr. They drew into the conspiracy such people as Generaloberst Ludwig Beck, General Wilhelm Adam, Generaloberst Walther von Brauchitsch, Generaloberst Franz Halder, Admiral Wilhelm Canaris, and Generalleutnant Erwin von Witzleben. The working plan was for Count Hans-Jürgen von Blumenthal to lead a storm party into the Reich Chancellery and kill Hitler. It would then be necessary to neutralize the Nazi Party apparatus in order to stop them from proceeding with the invasion of Czechoslovakia, which they believed would lead to a war that would ruin Germany.

In addition to these military figures, the conspirators also had contact with Secretary of State Ernst von Weizsäcker and the diplomats Theodor Kordt, Erich Kordt and Hans Bernd Gisevius. Theodor Kordt was considered a vital contact with the British on whom the success of the plot depended; the conspirators needed strong British opposition to Hitler's seizure of the Sudetenland. However, Neville Chamberlain, apprehensive of the possibility of war, negotiated at length with Hitler and eventually conceded strategic areas of Czechoslovakia to him. Poland also invaded Czechoslovakia on October 1, 1938. This destroyed any chance of the plot succeeding, as Hitler was then seen in Germany as the "greatest statesman of all times at the moment of his greatest triumph", and the immediate risk of war had been neutralized.

== Participants ==
Data from Parsinnen (2012)

=== The Conspirators ===
- Adam, General of Infantry Wilhelm, commander of Germany's "West Wall"
- Beck, Colonel General Ludwig, former chief of the Army General Staff
- Brauchitsch, Colonel General Walther von, commander in chief of the army
- Brockdorff-Ahlefeldt, General Walter, Graf von, commander of Twenty-third Division, Potsdam; subordinate of General Erwin von Witzleben
- Canaris, Admiral Wilhelm, chief of the Abwehr (Military Intelligence)
- Dohnanyi, Hans von, Ministry of Justice
- Gisevius, Hans-Bernd, Department of the Interior
- Goerdeler, Carl, former mayor of Leipzig and former Reich price commissioner
- Groscurth, Lieutenant Colonel Helmuth, Abwehr
- Halder, General of Artillery Franz, chief of the Army General Staff
- Hase, Major General Paul von, commander of Fiftieth Infantry Regiment (Landsberg an der Warthe)
- Heinz, Captain Friedrich Wilhelm, Abwehr
- Helldorf, Wolf, Graf von, police president, Berlin
- Hoepner, General of Artillery Erich, commander, First Light Division
- Kleist-Schmenzin, Ewald von (the elder), Prussian aristocrat
- Kluge, General of Artillery Hans Gunther von, commander of Wehrkreis VI (Münster)
- Kordt, Erich, chief of Ministerial Office, German Foreign Ministry, brother of Theo
- Kordt, Theo, counselor, German Embassy, London, brother of Erich
- Liedig, Lieutenant Franz Maria, Abwehr
- List, General of Infantry Wilhelm, commander, Wehrkreis IV (Dresden)
- Nebe, Arthur, chief of Criminal Police
- Olbricht, Lieutenant General Friedrich, chief of staff to General List, Wehrkreis IV (Dresden)
- Oster, Lieutenant Colonel Hans, Abwehr, organizer of the conspiracy
- Rohricht, Lieutenant Colonel Edgar, staff officer to Generalleutnant Olbricht
- Schacht, Hjalmar, head of the Reichsbank, former minister of finance
- Schlabrendorff, Fabian von, lawyer; historian of the resistance movement; not directly involved in the 1938 plot
- Schulenburg, Fritz-Dietlof, Graf von der, vice president, Berlin Police
- Simonis, Susanne, reporter for the Deutsche Allgemeine Zeitung, cousin of Erich and Theo Kordt
- Strünck, Theodor, and Elisabeth Gartner-Striinck, friends of Oster's and sympathizers with the resistance
- Stilpnagel, Lieutenant General Carl-Heinrich von, deputy chief of staff II on Army General Staff
- Ulex, General of Artillery Alexander, commander of XI Army Corps (Hannover)
- Weizsäcker, Ernst von, state secretary, German Foreign Ministry
- Wiedemann, Captain Fritz, Hitler's adjutant
- Witzleben, General of Infantry Erwin von, commander of Wehrkreis III (Berlin)
- Witzleben, Lieutenant Colonel Hermann von, cousin of Erwin von Witzleben

=== The Nazis ===
- Goebbels, Joseph, minister of propaganda
- Göring, Reich Marshal Hermann, commander of the Luftwaffe and Hitler's designated successor
- Heydrich, Reinhard, commander of the SD (Sicherheitsdienst—Security Service) and the Gestapo
- Himmler, Reichsfuhrer-SS Heinrich, commander of the SS
- Hitler, Adolf, chancellor and fuhrer
- Kaltenbrunner, Ernst, SD subordinate and, after 1942, successor of Heydrich
- Lorenz, Werner, SD official
- Ribbentrop, Joachim von, foreign minister

=== The British ===
- Cadogan, Sir Alexander, permanent undersecretary, Foreign Office
- Chamberlain, Neville, prime minister
- Churchill, Winston S., Conservative member of Parliament
- Dawson, Sir Geoffrey, editor in chief, The Times
- Duff Cooper, Alfred, First Lord of the Admiralty
- Halifax, Edward Wood, third Viscount Halifax, foreign secretary
- Henderson, Sir Nevile, ambassador to Germany
- Kirkpatrick, Sir Ivone, first secretary at British Embassy, Berlin
- Simon, Sir John, chancellor of the exchequer
- Stanley, Oliver, president of the Board of Trade
- Vansittart, Sir Robert, chief diplomatic adviser to the government
- Wilson, Sir Horace, chief industrial adviser to the government, confidant of prime minister

=== Others ===
- Beneš, Edvard, president of Czechoslovakia
- Blomberg, Field Marshal Werner von, former war minister
- Daladier, Edouard, prime minister of France
- Engel, Captain Gerhard, Hitler's army adjutant
- Frank, Karl Hermann, official of Sudeten German Party
- Fritsch, Colonel General Werner von, former commander of the army
- Henlein, Konrad, leader of the Sudeten German Party
- Hossbach, Colonel Friedrich, Hitler's former adjutant
- Jodl, Major General Alfred, chief of Operations Office, Oberkommando der Wehrmacht (OKW)
- Keitel, General of Artillery Wilhelm, chief of OKW; in fact, Hitler's administrator
- Liebmann, General of Infantry Curt, Fifth Army commander
- Masaryk, Jan, Czechoslovak ambassador to the United Kingdom
- Raeder, Admiral Erich, commander of the navy
- Schmidt, Paul Otto, Hitler's interpreter

== Aftermath ==
The plotters survived to become leaders of German resistance to Hitler and Nazism during the Second World War. Oster himself was on active duty until 1943, when placed under house arrest after other Abwehr officers were caught helping Jews to escape Germany. He and Canaris were executed by hanging in Flossenbürg concentration camp on 9 April 1945.

== See also ==
- Assassination attempts on Adolf Hitler
- Pius XII and the German Resistance

== Bibliography ==
- Jones, Nigel (2008). Countdown to Valkyrie: The July Plot to Assassinate Hitler. Philadelphia, Pennsylvania: Casemate. ISBN 978-1-84832-508-1.
- Mueller, Michael (2017). Nazi Spymaster: The Life and Death of Admiral Wilhelm Canaris. New York City, New York: Skyhorse. ISBN 978-1-5107-1777-0.
- Parssinen, Terry M. (2001). The Oster Conspiracy of 1938 : The Unknown Story of the Military Plot to Kill Hitler and Avert World War II. HarperCollins. ISBN 5-559-44059-0.
- Parssinen, Terry (2012). The Oster Conspiracy of 1938 : The Unknown Story of the Military Plot to Kill Hitler and Avert World War II. Random House. ISBN 1-4481-1480-2.
- von Schlabrendorff, Fabian (1994). The Secret War Against Hitler. Westview Press. ISBN 0-8133-2190-5.
