= Królowy Most =

- Village
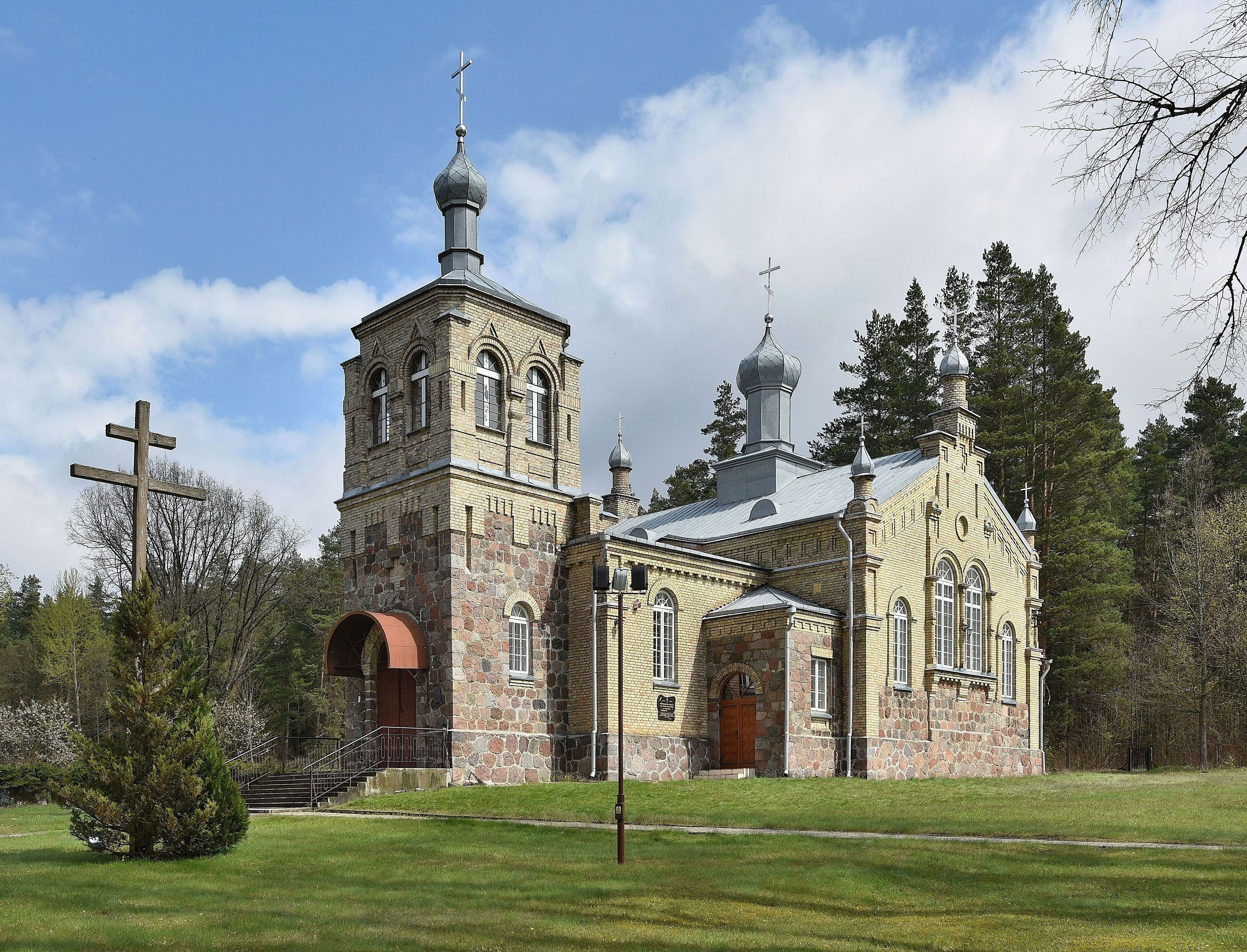

- Location within Poland
- Coordinates: 53°8′34″N 23°28′20″E
- Country: Poland
- Voivodeship: Podlaskie
- County: Białystok
- Gmina: Gródek
- Population: 90

Królowy Most [kruˈlɔvɨ ˈmɔst] is a village in the administrative district of Gmina Gródek, within Białystok County, Podlaskie Voivodeship, in north-eastern Poland, close to the border with Belarus.

Królowy Most is the death place of German commander Henning von Tresckow, who committed suicide there after the failed 20 July plot against Hitler.
