= Fabian von Schlabrendorff =

German jurist, soldier, and member of the resistance against Adolf Hitler (1907–1980)

Justice of the Federal Constitutional Court of Germany
- In office 1 September 1967 – 7 November 1975

Personal details
- Born: Fabian Ludwig Georg Adolf Kurt von Schlabrendorff; 1 July 1907 Halle (Saale), Kingdom of Prussia, German Empire
- Died: 4 September 1980 (aged 73) Wiesbaden, Hesse, West Germany
- Resting place: St. Martin (Morsum), Sylt
- Spouse: Luitgarde von Bismarck (m. 1939)
- Children: 6

Military service
- Allegiance: Nazi Germany; German resistance to Nazism
- Branch/service: German Army
- Rank: Ordonnanzoffizier
- Battles/wars: World War II

Fabian Ludwig Georg Adolf Kurt von Schlabrendorff (German: [ˈfaːbi̯aːn fɔn ˈʃla.bʁənˌ̯dɔʁf]; 1 July 1907 – 3 September 1980) was a German jurist, soldier, and member of the German resistance against Adolf Hitler. From 1967 to 1975 he was a judge of the German Federal Constitutional Court.

== Biography ==
=== Early life ===
Schlabrendorff was born on 1 July 1907 in Halle. He was the son of Carl Ludwig Ewald von Schlabrendorff (born Berlin, 1854, died Detmold, 1923) by his marriage to Ida von Stockmar (1874–1944), a great-great-granddaughter of William I, Elector of Hesse by his mistress Rosa Dorothea Ritter. He was trained as a lawyer, later joining the German Army. As a reserve lieutenant-colonel (Oberstleutnant der Reserve), he was promoted to serve as adjutant (Ordonnanzoffizier) to Colonel Henning von Tresckow in January 1941, a major leader in the resistance against Adolf Hitler, and held this position until July 1944.

=== Attempts to kill Hitler ===
Schlabrendorff joined the resistance and acted as a secret liaison between Tresckow in Russia and Ludwig Beck, Carl Goerdeler, Hans Oster, and Friedrich Olbricht in Berlin, taking part in various coup d'état plans and plots. On 13 March 1943, during a visit by Hitler to Army Group Centre Headquarters in Smolensk, Schlabrendorff smuggled a time bomb, disguised as bottles of Cointreau, onto the aircraft which carried Hitler back to Germany. The bomb detonator failed to go off, most likely because of the cold in the aircraft luggage compartment. Schlabrendorff managed to retrieve the bomb the next day and elude detection.

Schlabrendorff was arrested following the failed 20 July 1944 plot. He was sent to a Gestapo prison, where he was tortured, but refused to talk. While imprisoned he met fellow imprisoned co-conspirators Wilhelm Canaris, Hans Oster, Ulrich von Hassell, Johannes Popitz, Carl Goerdeler, Josef Mueller, and Alexander von Falkenhausen. He was brought before the People's Court (Volksgerichtshof) of Nazi Germany on 3 February 1945. While Schlabrendorff was awaiting trial, the courtroom took a direct hit from a bomb during an American air raid led by Lt. Col. Robert Rosenthal. The bomb killed Roland Freisler, the president of the People's Court, who was found crushed by a column, still clutching Schlabrendorff's file.

Schlabrendorff did not escape, and was arraigned before the court again the following month. Wilhelm Crohne, the vice president of the People's Court, now headed the court. Following an intense defence, conducted by himself on both legal and procedural grounds (claiming his torture had made the process outrageously unworthy of justice) and in an exceptionally rare instance in its final nine months of existence, the People's Court acquitted von Schlabrendorff on 16 March 1945. His death was later demanded by Hitler's decree, but the order was defied insofar as it was never carried out.

After his second trial, Schlabrendorff was moved from one concentration camp to another: Sachsenhausen and Flossenbürg, then Dachau near Munich. In late April 1945 he was transferred to Tyrol together with about 140 other prominent inmates of Dachau, where the SS-Guards fled after being confronted by a regular German Wehrmacht unit led by Wichard von Alvensleben and told to stand down by the supreme commander of all SS troops in Italy, who took responsibility for the order. Schlabrendorff was eventually liberated by the Fifth U.S. Army on 5 May 1945.

=== After the war ===
As was revealed only 60 years after the fact, Schlabrendorff wrote analyses for the US secret service OSS about the leadership of the Wehrmacht and about war crimes committed by the Nazis. OSS head William J. Donovan then questioned him personally. When Donovan became adviser to the American delegation of lawyers at the Nuremberg trials after the dissolution of the OSS, he included Schlabrendorff on his staff. Schlabrendorff convinced Donovan that it was not the Germans but the Soviet secret service NKVD that had murdered some 4,000 Polish officers in the Katyn forest. Donovan then had the Americans block the Soviet attempt to add Katyn to the list of German war crimes.

Schlabrendorff was admitted to the Protestant Order of Saint John (Bailiwick of Brandenburg), in which he served as Captain of the Order (legal counsellor to the Herrenmeister, head of the Order) from 1957 to 1964. From 1 September 1967 until 7 November 1975, he was a judge of the Federal Constitutional Court of West Germany, the country's supreme constitutional court, serving in its second senate. Schlabrendorff died on 3 September 1980.

=== Family ===
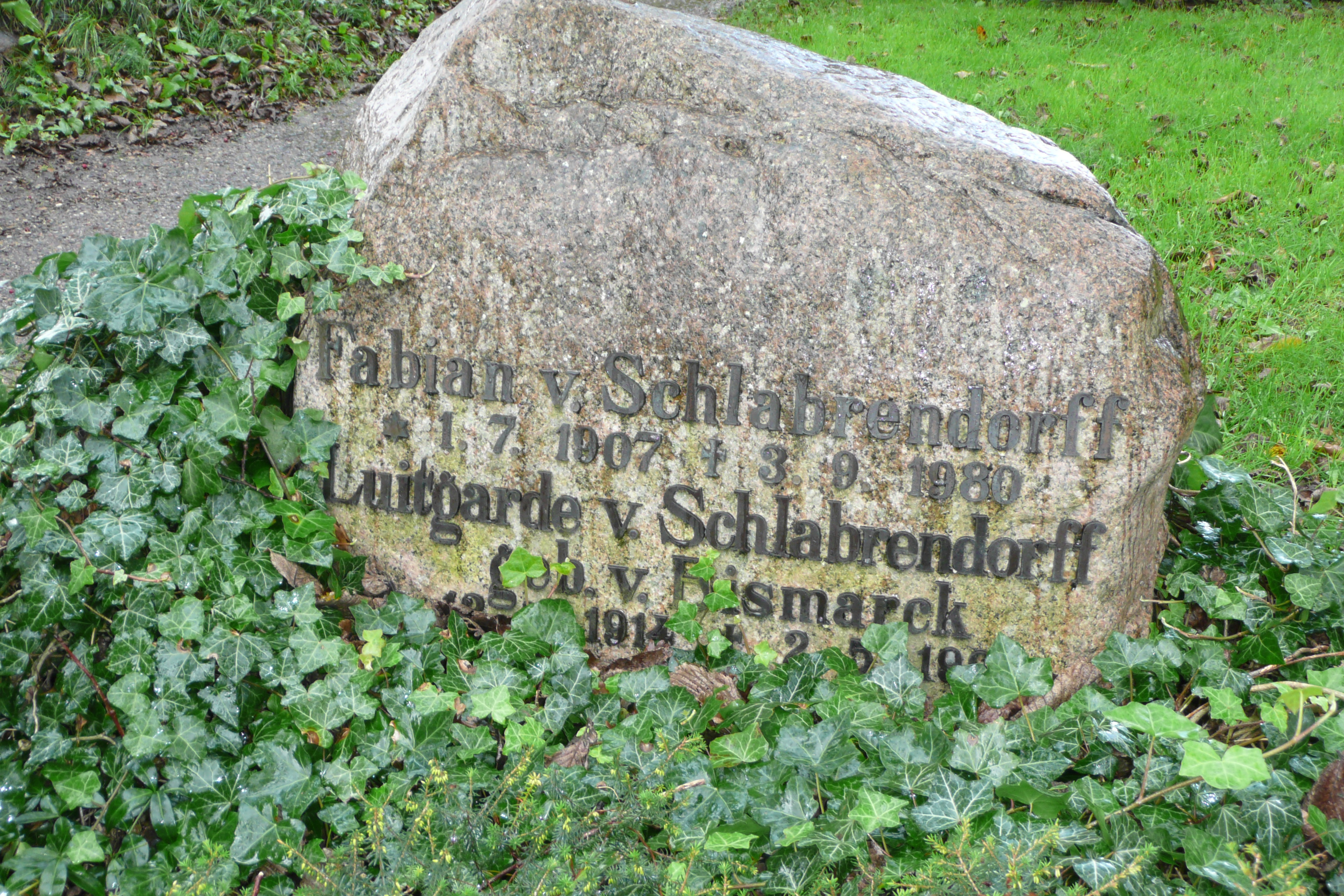
Schlabrendorff's grave

Schlabrendorff married Luitgarde von Bismarck, born at Frankenstein in Silesia (now Ząbkowice Śląskie, Poland) in 1939, and had the following children:

- Herzeleide von Schlabrendorff (born Berlin, 28 February 1940), married to Andreas Stökl (Hamburg, 15 June 1939 – 2 May 2006), four children.
- Dieprand Ludwig Carl Hans-Otto von Schlabrendorff (born Stettin, 18 May 1941), married to Eva von Polenz (born Karlsruhe, 10 June 1950), one child.
- Jürgen-Lewin Hans von Schlabrendorff (born Lasbeck, 3 February 1943), married to Beate Everth (born Meldorf, 6 November 1946), and had two children.
- Fabian Gotthard Herbert von Schlabrendorff (born Berlin, 23 December 1944), married to María de la Cruz Caballero y Palomero (b. Plasencia, 20 December 1954), two children.
- Maria von Schlabrendorff (born Buch am Forst, 12 November 1948), married Christian Eick (born Baden-Baden, 7 July 1947), three children; married to Gottfried von Bismarck.
- Carl Joachim Henning von Schlabrendorff (born Wiesbaden, 18 September 1950), married to Mechthild von Hülst, with two children.

== Published works ==
- von Schlabrendorff, Fabian (1946). Offiziere gegen Hitler [Officers against Hitler] (in German) (1 ed.). Zürich: Europa-Verlag.
- von Schlabrendorff, Fabian (1965). The Secret War Against Hitler (Der Widerstand: Dissent and Resistance in the Third Reich). Translated by Simon, Hilda. United States: Pitman Publishing Corporation. English translation revising and expanding the 1946 book by von Schlabrendorff.
- von Schlabrendorff, Fabian (1979). Begegnungen in fünf Jahrzehnten [Encounters in five decades] (in German). Wunderlich. ISBN 978-3805203234.

== Honours ==
- 1967: Great Cross of Merit of the Order of Merit of the Federal Republic of Germany
- 1968: Honorary doctorate awarded by the University of Göttingen (Dr. iur. h.c.)

== Bibliography ==
- Hartmann, Christian (2007). "von Schlabrendorff, Fabian". Neue Deutsche Biographie (in German). Vol. 23. Berlin: Duncker & Humblot. pp. 16–17. (full text online)..
- Manvell, Rodger (1972). The Conspirators: 20 July 1944 (1 ed.). Pan Macmillan. ISBN 978-0345097293.
- Moorhouse, Rodger (2006). Killing Hitler. Jonathan Cape. ISBN 978-0-224-07121-5.

== See also ==
- Assassination attempts on Adolf Hitler
