= Erich Kordt =

German diplomat (1903–1969)

- Born: 10 December 1903
- Died: 11 November 1969 (aged 65)
- Education: Oxford University (Rhodes Scholar)
- Occupations: Diplomat, Professor of International Law
- Employer: German Foreign Office
- Known for: Involvement in the German Resistance against Adolf Hitler
- Political party: Nazi Party (from 1937)
- Movement: German Resistance
- Relatives: Theodor Kordt (brother)

Erich Kordt (10 December 1903 – 11 November 1969), was a German diplomat who was involved in the German Resistance to the regime of Adolf Hitler.

== Early career ==
A convinced Anglophile, Kordt spoke perfect English after gaining a Rhodes Scholarship to Oxford University. He joined the German Foreign Office in 1928 and was posted to Geneva and Bern in Switzerland. He then served as Legationsrat (counsellor) in the London Embassy under Ambassador Joachim von Ribbentrop for whom he developed a personal dislike and a professional disdain. Still, he became a member of the Nazi Party in November 1937. In February 1938, when Ribbentrop became foreign minister, he was named as head of the Foreign Office's "Ministerial Bureau".

== Oster Conspiracy ==
Both Erich Kordt and his brother, Theodor, played a part in the Oster Conspiracy of 1938, which was a proposed plan to assassinate Adolf Hitler if Germany went to war with Czechoslovakia over the Sudetenland.

Theodor Kordt, who acted as Chargé d'Affaires at the London embassy, was considered a vital contact with the British on whom the success of the plot depended; the conspirators needed strong British opposition to Hitler's seizure of the Sudetenland. Erich used his brother as an envoy to urge the British government to stand up to Hitler over the Czechoslovakia crisis, in the hope that Army officers would stage a coup against Hitler.

However, in the event, British Prime Minister Neville Chamberlain was apprehensive of the possibility of war and so negotiated interminably with Hitler and eventually conceded to him. That destroyed any chance of the plot succeeding since Hitler was then seen in Germany as the "greatest statesman of all times at the moment of his greatest triumph", as was stated by another member of the German Resistance, Erwin von Witzleben.

== Espionage ==
In June 1939, Kordt went to London to warn Robert Vansittart, the diplomatic advisor to the British government, of the secret negotiations between Germany and the Soviet Union which were to lead to the Nazi-Soviet Pact. He was dismayed that all approaches made by the German resistance movement within the German Foreign Office were ignored by the British.

In April 1941, Kordt was posted to Tokyo as German embassy First Secretary and later to Nanking as German Consul, where he worked as an agent for the Soviet spy Richard Sorge until 1944. He narrowly avoided being killed by a Japanese hitman when Japanese Intelligence discovered his espionage activities.

== Postwar ==
In June 1946, at the Nuremberg Trials, Kordt testified on behalf of Ernst von Weizsäcker, State Secretary of the Foreign Ministry of Nazi Germany, and later German ambassador to the Vatican. Weizsäcker was on trial for his role in Hitler's aggressive foreign policy. Partly as a result of Kordt's testimony, Weizsäcker was acquitted. This allegedly aroused the hostility of Federal Chancellor Konrad Adenauer, who blocked Kordt's return to a career at the Foreign Office. From 1951, Kordt was a professor of international law at the University of Cologne.

== See also ==
- Assassination attempts on Adolf Hitler
