= Hans Oster =

German general and resistance member (1887–1945)

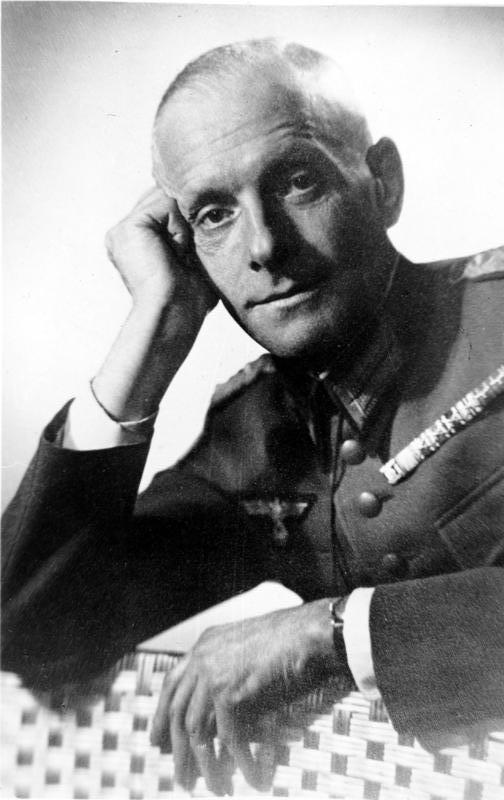
- Oster in 1939

Deputy Chief of the Abwehr
- In office 1935 – 21 July 1944
- Leader: Wilhelm Canaris

Personal details
- Born: Hans Paul Oster; 9 August 1887 Dresden, German Empire
- Died: 9 April 1945 (aged 57) Flossenbürg concentration camp, Nazi Germany
- Cause of death: Execution by hanging
- Known for: German Resistance to Nazism

Military service
- Allegiance: German Empire; Weimar Republic; Nazi Germany
- Branch/service: Imperial German Army; Reichswehr; German Army
- Years of service: 1907–1932; 1935–1944
- Rank: Generalmajor
- Battles/wars: World War I World War II

Hans Paul Oster (9 August 1887 – 9 April 1945) was a German general in the Wehrmacht and a leading figure in the military resistance to Adolf Hitler. As deputy head of the counter‑espionage bureau in the Abwehr, he used his position to support and coordinate opposition activities under the cover of intelligence work.

Oster played a central role in the Oster conspiracy of September 1938 and helped reorganize the resistance network at the outbreak of the Second World War. During the Phoney War, he warned the Dutch government of Germany’s impending invasion, and he later worked closely with figures such as Ludwig Beck, Helmuth Groscurth, and Hans von Dohnanyi. Arrested in 1943 after the exposure of anti‑Nazi activities within the Abwehr, he was implicated again when the secret diaries of Admiral Wilhelm Canaris were discovered in April 1945. Oster was executed at Flossenbürg concentration camp on 9 April 1945.

== Early career ==
Oster was born in Dresden, Saxony in 1887, the son of an Alsatian pastor of the French Protestant Church. He was raised in the environment of the Wilhelmine Empire and was an enthusiastic admirer of the monarchy throughout his life, while at the same time, he was distinguished by his liberal, tolerant attitude and appreciation of Christian-humanist traditions, as well as his enjoyment of French language and culture.

In 1907, Oster entered the artillery corps and during World War I served on the Western Front until 1916, when he was appointed as captain to the German General Staff. After the war, he remained in the reduced Reichswehr, whose officer corps was limited to 4,000 by the Treaty of Versailles. He had to resign from the army in 1932 as punishment for his affair with a married woman.

He soon found a job in a new organisation that Hermann Göring established under the Prussian police, before transferring to the Abwehr in October 1933—where he met Hans Bernd Gisevius and Arthur Nebe, then working in the Gestapo, and became a confidant and deputy to Admiral Canaris.

== Opposition to Adolf Hitler ==
=== Opposition's beginnings ===
Not long after Hitler and the Nazis came to power, Oster had already taken a critical attitude toward the regime and its leadership. Then, during the summer of 1934, in the wake of the events surrounding the Röhm affair, Oster's former superior Kurt von Schleicher was murdered; an event that turned Oster into a "fierce opponent" of the Nazis. German historian Walter Goerlitz characterized Oster not merely as an anti-Hitlerite like his co-conspirators, but wrote that he (Oster) was "especially determined" to maintain contact with "Hitler's underground enemies."

In 1935, Oster was allowed to re-join the army but not as a member of the General Staff. By 1938, the Blomberg–Fritsch Affair and Kristallnacht (the Nazi-led pogrom against Jews in Germany), turned his antipathy into a hatred of Nazism and a willingness to help save Jews. During the Fritsch crisis, Oster met Generaloberst (Colonel General) Ludwig Beck, Chief of the General Staff, for the first time, making the connections for the Oster conspiracy of September 1938. Hans Rothfels, one of the early historians writing on the German resistance networks, described Oster as "a clear-cut figure" who was "not merely the 'technician' who covered up the conspiracy and maintained…valuable contacts" but "one of the main driving forces" of the resistance itself. German historian Hans Mommsen claims similarly, identifying Oster as "perhaps the most striking example of an officer who, from 1938 onwards, systematically resisted the regime," and as one who "uncompromisingly confronted" the dilemma Bonhoeffer articulated regarding Christian civilization's chances for survival in the face of Nazi tyranny and criminality.

=== Sudetenland crisis ===
Oster's position in the Abwehr was invaluable to the conspirators, since the organisation could provide false papers and restricted materials, disguise conspiratorial activities as intelligence work, link disparate resistance cells, and supply intelligence. The first military-backed conspiracy to overthrow Hitler resulted from the Fuehrer's intention to invade Czechoslovakia, which Oster and others in his circle opposed. In August 1938, Beck spoke openly at a meeting of army generals in Berlin about his opposition to a war with the Western powers over Hitler's plan against Czechoslovakia. When Hitler was informed of Beck's misgivings, he demanded and received Beck's resignation. Beck was highly respected in the army and his removal shocked the officer corps. His successor as Chief of Staff, Franz Halder, remained in touch with him and also with Oster. Privately, he said that he considered Hitler "the incarnation of evil".

Oster, Gisevius and Hjalmar Schacht urged Halder and Beck to stage a coup against Hitler. Not only did Oster want to remove Hitler from power, he also was convinced that the resistance needed to eliminate SS-Reichsführer Heinrich Himmler and the Gestapo. (Note: During the trial at Flossenbürg, Oster later confessed that Nazi persecution of the Jews, the extermination policy, and the war itself had together persuaded him that dismantling the SS and Gestapo alone could never suffice to rehabilitate Germany.) However, the army generals argued that they could mobilise support among the officer corps only if Hitler made overt moves towards war. On Oster's recommendation, Halder conferred with Schacht about plans for a coup by 15 September, and it was eventually agreed that Halder would instigate the coup when Hitler committed an overt step towards war.

A replacement government had already been envisioned by the resistance planners. Correspondingly, the constitutional blueprint worked out in the summer of 1938 by Oster, Fritz-Dietlof von der Schulenburg, and Friedrich Heinz—central to Oster's vision of a post-Nazi refashioning of Germany—fused a völkisch-nationalist agenda with Prusso-German socialism under a restored "German monarchy," a synthesis owing no small debt to Friedrich Naumann's concept of a "democratic imperium (Kaisertum)."

Emissaries from among the conspirators traveled to Britain, with the assistance of Oster and the Abwehr, to urge the British to stand firm against Hitler over the Sudeten crisis. Oster urged Erich Kordt, head of the Ministeramt, to extract from London an unequivocal threat of British intervention, convinced that only a blunt warning might restrain Hitler. He helped channel a steady stream of intelligence to London and Paris indicating that an attack on Czechoslovakia was imminent. Yet despite these efforts—and despite intermediaries such as Ewald von Kleist stressing the personal risk involved—the British response remained noncommittal, leaving Oster's initiative without effect.

To some degree, Oster had exaggerated matters to elicit fear and support, which was significantly allayed by the subsequent negotiations between Germany and Britain. On 28 September, the British Prime Minister Neville Chamberlain agreed to a meeting in Munich, where he accepted the dismemberment of Czechoslovakia. Hitler's diplomatic triumph undermined and demoralised the conspirators. Until that time Halder seemed keen to stage a coup.

=== Outbreak of war and reorganization of the resistance (1939) ===
In the autumn of 1939, many of the senior military and Foreign Office figures who had moved toward opposition during the Sudeten crisis concluded that Hitler’s removal was the only means of effecting real change within the regime. Oster, with Canaris's support, worked to make the Abwehr the center of a renewed oppositional network, building on contacts established the previous year. He placed his trusted associate Helmuth Groscurth as liaison to Halder at the Army High Command in Zossen and encouraged the appointment of other opponents of the regime—such as Hasso von Etzdorf—to key liaison posts.

Oster also brought Hans Dohnanyi onto his staff to expand these contacts and maintain links with former Army Chief Ludwig Beck; many regarded him as the figurehead of the emerging resistance. Despite growing alarm over Hitler's determination to press ahead with an attack on France and Britain, members within the network remained fragmented and hesitant. By the end of 1939, no attempt to remove Hitler had materialized, and the weaknesses of the nascent resistance were already evident.

=== Invasion of Poland ===
As war again grew more likely in mid-1939, the efforts for a coup were revived. Oster was still in contact with Halder and Witzleben. In August, along with Gisevius, Schacht and Thomas, he decided to do something what Gisevius described as "one last desperate step." Schacht, Gisevius, Thomas and Canaris proposed to go to Zossen, thinking that since Schacht was still Reichsminister, he would not be denied access. Later, on 25 August, at the Abwehr office on the Tirpitzufer, they proposed to confront Halder and Brauchitsch with an ultimatum: since the decision for war had not been discussed by the Reichskabinett, it was unconstitutional, and the Army must either place troops at Schacht's disposal to uphold the Reich government or arrest those present who supported Hitler. The latter option was discouraged by the threat that the conspirators would expose their earlier agreements.

Nearly at the moment when Canaris and Oster were convinced that Hitler was finished and the moment to overthrow him was afoot, the order to attack Poland was issued and the conspirators not knowing whether this was the actual event or not "condemned the opposition to inactivity," according to historian Peter Hoffmann. Many officers, particularly those from the Prussian Junker background, were strongly anti-Polish and saw a war to regain Danzig and other lost eastern territories as justified. After the outbreak of World War II, resistance in the army became harder to contemplate since it could lead to the defeat of Germany. When Hitler vowed to destroy the spirit of Zossen, meaning defeatism, Halder feared discovery and destroyed all incriminating documents.

=== Phoney War ===
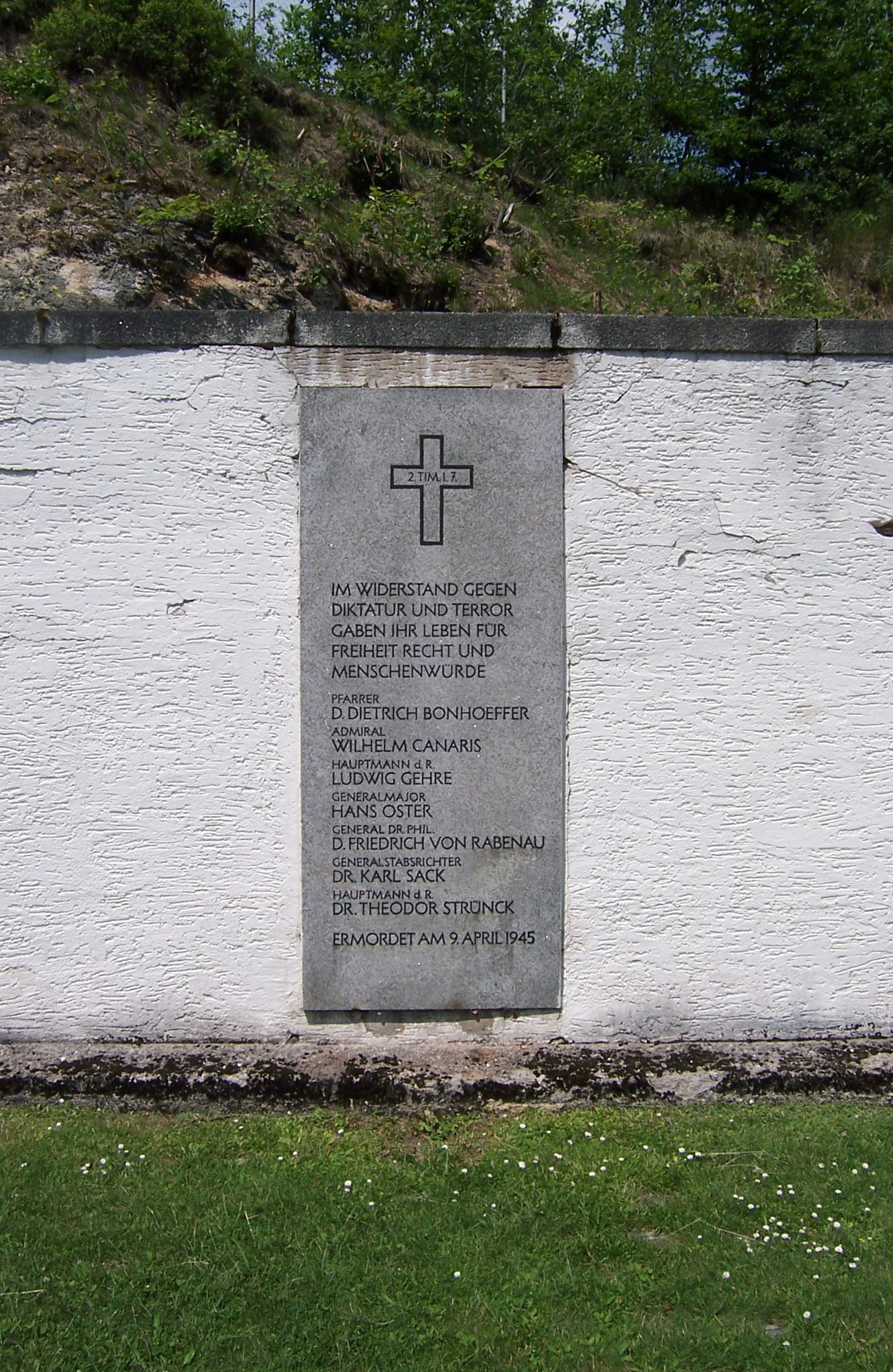
Memorial to members of the resistance, including Oster, executed at Flossenbürg.

Months ahead of the event, Oster informed his friend Bert Sas, the Netherlands' military attaché in Berlin, multiple times the date of the postponed invasion of the Netherlands. Sas passed the information to his government but was not believed. Oster himself had calculated that his actions might cost the lives of 40,000 German soldiers—yet concluded that such casualties were preferable to the millions of victims and untold destruction of a prolonged war. To this end, Oster told Sas:

"People may well say that I am a traitor, but in reality I am not. I regard myself as a better German than all those who are trotting along behind Hitler. It is both my purpose and my duty to liberate Germany, and with her the world, from this plague."

Rothfels observed that Oster acted "both from feelings of indignation and European solidarity and also with the aim of avoiding a total defeat for his country by incurring a smaller military reverse which would make it possible to overthrow the regime." Notwithstanding the admirable efforts by Oster and others in the opposition's conspiratorial circle to save Jews from persecution and genocide, Mommsen writes that it was a secondary motivation to averting Germany's "military defeat and the triumph of the Soviet Union."

Warnings unheeded, the attack Oster had leaked began on 10 May 1940 and caught the Allied commanders by surprise. Despite that the forces eventually facing one another in the West were of nearly equivalent strength, (Note: The Allies actually had 137 Divisions supported by 34 Dutch and Belgian divisions to the Nazis' 136 divisions; 2,800 Allied planes to 1,000 German aircraft, and 3,000 Allied tanks and artillery pieces to 2,500 for the Germans.) the decisive factor proved the Nazis' operational plan slicing first through the Netherlands, Belgium, and Luxembourg using highly trained paratroopers. Rapid and overwhelming German military victories in the West during May–June 1940 dealt a major setback to Oster and the military opposition, which left Oster's influence sharply reduced as the officer corps rallied behind the regime.

=== Rebuilding the resistance network ===
The period between 1941 and 1942 represented the nadir of the anti-Hitler resistance within the German military (examples being for instance, the “Kreisau Circle”), in many ways based on their unrealistic nature and the potential conspirators’ inability to reach consensus. Add to this, German victories in France and the opening campaigns in the Soviet Union, which silenced many who had feared military disaster; meanwhile, Hitler's enormous popular support made organised opposition appear futile to many officers who privately retained their reservations about a coup.

Oster nonetheless continued his activities and at the end of September 1941, Tresckow's special operations officer Fabian von Schlabrendorff was sent to Berlin to contact opposition circles and declare that the staff of Army Group Centre was "prepared to do anything"—the first initiative to come from the front, made at the very height of German expansion. Schlabrendorff thereafter served as the permanent liaison between Army Group Centre and the opposition circle around Beck, Goerdeler, and Oster. Towards the end of 1942 this connection deepened when Schlabrendorff met General Friedrich Olbricht of the General Army Office at the Bendlerblock in central Berlin, through Captain Hermann Kaiser—leading to a meeting between Goerdeler, Olbricht, and Tresckow at which Olbricht pledged himself to organise a coup using the Replacement Army in Berlin, Vienna, Cologne, and Munich. The Abwehr group supplied British-made explosive devices to Tresckow's group for their assassination attempts against Hitler in 1943, the most significant of which—the Smolensk aircraft bomb of 13 March 1943—failed only because the detonator malfunctioned in the cargo hold. (Note: Chief of U.S. intelligence in Switzerland, Allen Dulles (1893–1969), who later became head of the CIA, made contact with the anti-Hitler conspirators associated with Oster and the Abwehr in January 1943 and again in April 1944.)

=== Arrest by the Gestapo ===
In 1943, the Abwehr group's clandestine efforts to rescue Jews were exposed by the Gestapo and Oster was dismissed from his post. Hans von Dohnanyi and Dietrich Bonhoeffer—the Lutheran theologian and Dohnanyi's brother-in-law—had helped 14 Jews flee to Switzerland disguised as Abwehr agents in Operation U-7, an activity that Mommsen described as the culmination of "a motivated and extremely active group in the Abwehr, led by Oster, Dohnanyi and Bonhoeffer." Oster's handwritten Studie—a detailed coup execution plan naming units and individuals available for the rising—was among the most incriminating items recovered when the Gestapo opened the Zossen safe on 22 September 1944, and his ill-fated attempt to pocket papers during the April 1943 search of Dohnanyi's office directly precipitated the arrests of the Abwehr resistance circle.

Dohnanyi and Bonhoeffer were arrested in April 1943 on charges that included alleged foreign‑exchange violations connected to financial transactions involving the insurance firm Jauch & Hübener. Several figures associated with the firm, including Walter Jauch and Otto Hübener, were later executed. Oster was placed under house arrest following the apprehensions.

== Death ==
Generalmajor Oster was arrested one day after the failed 20 July plot to assassinate Hitler. On 4 April 1945, the diaries of Admiral Canaris were discovered, and in a rage upon reading them, Hitler ordered that all current and past conspirators—Oster among them—be executed. Oster, Dietrich Bonhoeffer, Wilhelm Canaris, and other anti-Nazis were convicted and sentenced to death by an SS drumhead court-martial presided over by Otto Thorbeck on 8 April 1945. All were hanged on the dawn of the next morning in the Flossenbürg concentration camp. Many members of Oster's family were also arrested, as were those of Goerdeler, von Tresckow, von Seydlitz, von Lehndorff, Schwerin von Schwanenfeld, Yorck von Wartenburg, von Moltke, Leber, von Kleist, and von Haeften—among many others—who all collectively suffered similar fates.

Schlabrendorff, one of the few senior anti-Nazis to survive the war, described Oster as "a man such as God meant men to be, lucid and serene in mind, imperturbable in danger". Historian Hans Mommsen likewise quipped that Oster "showed that it was still possible for a German officer to rise above his purely functional role and affirm his wider responsibilities, both to his country and as a human being," and that in doing so he acted "as a true patriot."

== See also ==
- List of members of the 20 July plot

== Bibliography ==
- Balfour, Michael (1988). Withstanding Hitler in Germany 1933–45. London: Routledge. ISBN 978-0-41500-617-0.
- Bethge, Eberhard (2000). Dietrich Bonhoeffer: A Biography. Fortress Press. ISBN 978-0-80062-844-4.
- Boatner, Mark M. (1996). The Biographical Dictionary of World War II. Presidio Press. ISBN 978-0-89141-548-0.
- Chowaniec, Elisabeth (1991). Der „Fall Dohnanyi" 1943–1945: Widerstand, Militärjustiz, SS-Willkür. Schriftenreihe der Vierteljahrshefte für Zeitgeschichte (in German). Vol. 62. Munich: R. Oldenbourg. ISBN 978-3-48664-562-0.
- Deutsch, Harold C. (1971). "The Rise of the Military Opposition in the Nazi Reich (Commentary by Peter Paret)". In Lt. Col. William Geffen (ed.). Command and Commanders in Modern Warfare: Proceedings of the Second Military History Symposium, USAF Academy, 1968. Washington, D.C.: Office of Air Force History, Headquarters USAF. pp. 119–160.
- Fest, Joachim (1974). Hitler. New York: Harcourt Brace Jovanovich Inc. ISBN 0-15-141650-8.
- Fest, Joachim (1996). Plotting Hitler's Death: The German Resistance to Hitler, 1933–1945. London: Weidenfeld & Nicolson. ISBN 978-0-297-81774-1.
- Goerlitz, Walter (1985) [1953]. History of the German General Staff, 1657–1945. New York: Barnes & Noble. ISBN 978-1-56619-914-8.
- Halder, Franz (1971). "The Military View: Comments by Six German Generals (Franz Halder)". In Lt. Col. William Geffen (ed.). Command and Commanders in Modern Warfare: Proceedings of the Second Military History Symposium, USAF Academy, 1968. Washington, D.C.: Office of Air Force History, Headquarters USAF. pp. 189–198.
- Hoffmann, Peter (1977). History of the German Resistance, 1933–1945. Montreal: McGill-Queen's University Press. ISBN 978-0-7735-1531-4.
- Höhne, Heinz (2001) [1969]. The Order of the Death's Head: The Story of Hitler's SS. New York: Penguin Press. ISBN 978-0-14139-012-3.
- Kershaw, Ian (2000). Hitler: 1936–1945, Nemesis. New York: W. W. Norton & Company. ISBN 978-0-39304-994-7.
- Kißener, Michael (1999). "Oster, Hans Paul". Neue Deutsche Biographie (in German). Vol. 19. Berlin: Duncker & Humblot. pp. 616–617.
- Mommsen, Hans (2003). Alternatives to Hitler: German Resistance Under the Third Reich. London: I.B. Tauris. ISBN 978-1-86064-745-1.
- Rothfels, Hans (1961). The German Opposition to Hitler: An Assessment. London: Oswald Wolff. ISBN 978-0-85496-119-1.
- Shirer, William L. (1969). The Collapse of the Third Republic: An Inquiry into the Fall of France in 1940. New York: Simon & Schuster. ISBN 978-0-67120-337-5. OCLC 27405.
- Shirer, William (1990). The Rise and Fall of the Third Reich. New York: MJF Books. ISBN 978-1-56731-163-1.
- Sifton, Elisabeth; Stern, Fritz (2013). No Ordinary Men: Dietrich Bonhoeffer and Hans von Dohnanyi. New York Review Books. ISBN 978-1-59017-681-8.
- Stafford, David (10 August 2003). "What Might Have Been". The Washington Post.
- Thomsett, Michael (2016). The German Opposition to Hitler: The Resistance, the Underground, and Assassination Plots (1938–1945). London: Crux Publishing. ISBN 978-1-90997-937-6.
- Zentner, Christian; Bedürftig, Friedemann (1991). The Encyclopedia of the Third Reich. (2 vols.) New York: MacMillan Publishing. ISBN 0-02-897500-6.

=== Further reading ===
- Moorhouse, Roger (2006). Killing Hitler: The Third Reich and the Plots against the Führer. London: Jonathan Cape. ISBN 9780224071215.
- Graf von Thun-Hohenstein, Romedio Galeazzo (1982). Die Verschwörer. General Oster und die Militäropposition (in German). Severin und Soedler. ISBN 9783423102919.
