= Hans Bernd Gisevius =

German diplomat

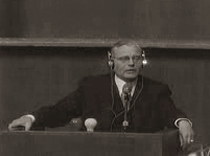
- Gisevius in 1946; during the Nuremberg trials
- Born: Gustav-Adolf Timotheus Hans Bernd Gisevius; July 14, 1904; Arnsberg, German Empire
- Died: February 23, 1974 (aged 69); Müllheim, West Germany
- Education: University of Marburg
- Occupations: Civil Servant; Politician; Police Officer; Intelligence Officer
- Political party: DNVP (1929-1933)
- Movement: Stahlhelm

Gustav-Adolf Timotheus Hans Bernd Gisevius (14 July 1904 – 23 February 1974) was a German politician, Gestapo and Abwehr officer and diplomat during the Second World War. He was a member of the Military Resistance, who actively participated in the Oster Conspiracy and the 20 July Plot, being among the few survivors. A covert opponent of the Nazi regime, he also served as a liaison in Zürich between Allen Dulles, station chief for the American OSS, and the German Resistance forces in Germany.

Gisevius was a witness for the defense, during the Nuremberg trials, testifying in favour of Hjalmar Schacht, who was acquitted, and against Hermann Göring, Ernst Kaltenbrunner and Wilhelm Keitel.

== Pre Second World War ==
Gisevius was born in Arnsberg in the Prussian Province of Westphalia. After law school, he joined the Prussian Interior Ministry in 1933 and was assigned to the newly formed Geheime Staatspolizei, or Gestapo. After joining the Gestapo, he immediately had disagreements with his senior, Rudolf Diels, and was discharged. He continued with police work in the Interior Ministry. When Heinrich Himmler took over Police functions in 1936 in the German Reich, he removed Gisevius from office.

Throughout his time working for the Gestapo, Gisevius described himself as living in constant fear, entering and exiting through the back door, clutching a pistol at his side – all resultant from his misgivings with the terror apparatus to which he was assigned, since according to him, it was like "living in a den of murderers". Gisevius later transferred to the Reich Ministry of the Interior. Although he had no position of power, he maintained connections, notably to Arthur Nebe, that kept him informed of the political background. Gisevius joined the secret opposition to Adolf Hitler, began gathering evidence of Nazi crimes (for use in a later prosecution) and attempted to restrain the increasing power of Himmler and the SS. He maintained links with Hans Oster and Hjalmar Schacht.

== Second World War ==
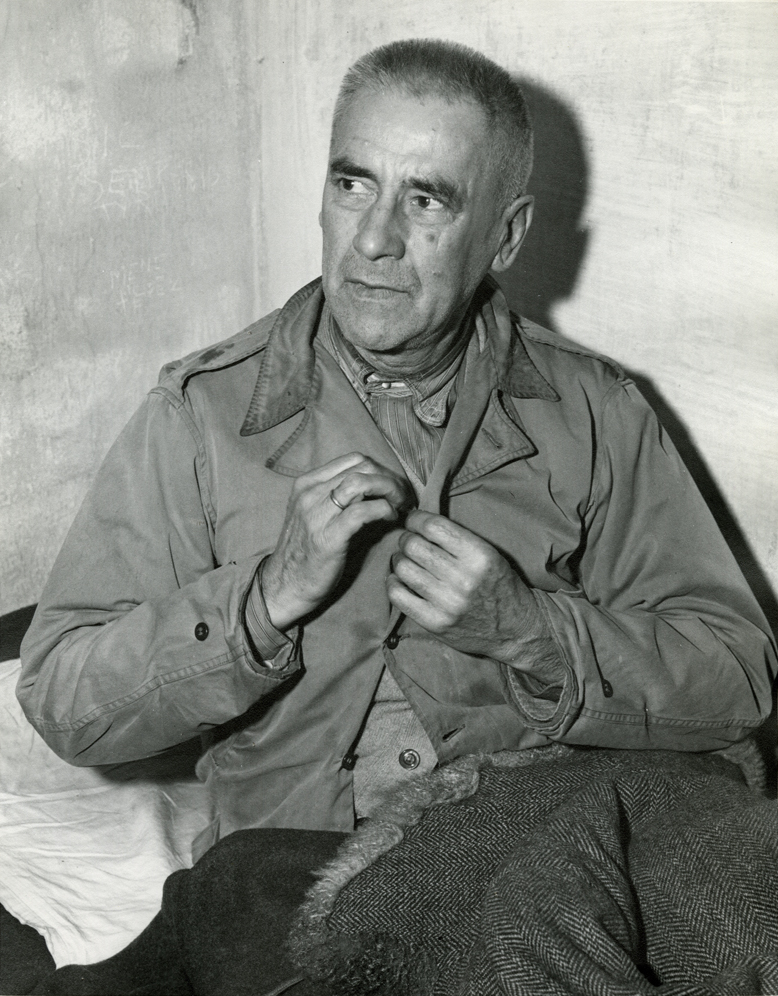
Frick in his cell at Nuremberg, November 1945

When the Second World War started, Gisevius joined the German intelligence service, the Abwehr, which was headed by Admiral Wilhelm Canaris, who was secretly an opponent of Hitler. Canaris had surrounded himself with Wehrmacht officers opposed to Hitler and he welcomed Gisevius into this group, which counted among its members General Ludwig Beck, Abwehr Chief Canaris, and Mayor Carl Goerdeler of Leipzig. Several members of the conspiratorial circle against Hitler including Gisevius, "all kept homes within easy walking distance of each other." According to Gisevius, the original plot to kill Hitler earlier (namely, before the acquiescence of Great Britain over the Sudetenland) was utterly derailed by Neville Chamberlain whose actions he claims "saved Hitler."

Canaris arranged for appointment of Gisevius as Vice Consul in Switzerland and in late 1940 introduced him to Halina Szymańska, who was working jointly for Polish intelligence and the British intelligence agency MI6. At a time when the British had very few agents in Germany itself, he provided accurate information on several matters, including the timing of the German invasions of Yugoslavia, Greece, and the USSR, and the development of V-weapons. However, he also provided incorrect information, stating that German forces in North Africa would not launch an offensive two days before they did. It is unclear whether, and to what extent, Gisevius was acting as a channel for information from Canaris in the interests of anti-Nazi elements, or whether he was serving the régime by providing a mixture of true and false information in order to disrupt Allied espionage activities. In late 1943, he told Szymańska that he was acting "as [a] Good German" who did not wish to see the war last longer. In January 1943, Gisevius had also begun acting as a source for Allen Dulles, the head of the Swiss station of the US intelligence agency OSS. He again supplied some intelligence that was very useful to the Allies (about German rocket research) and some that was inaccurate (claiming that flying boats in Rotterdam would be used for suicide attacks against London). Gisevius also warned Dulles that the Germans had broken the cypher he was using to communicate with Washington. By February 1944, Szymańska reported that Gisevius was persona non grata with his own side, which MI6 considered was due to Dulles' failure to conceal the source of his information. Working from the consulate in Zürich, Hans Gisevius was also involved in secret talks with the Vatican.

Upon returning to Germany, he was investigated by the Gestapo, but released. In 1944, after the failed 20 July assassination attempt against Hitler, Gisevius first hid at the home of his future wife, the Swiss national Gerda Woog, and fled to Switzerland in 1945, making him one of the few conspirators to survive the war. There, he contacted the Swiss authorities.

Peter Hoffmann's biography of Hitler assassination conspirator Claus von Stauffenberg ("Stauffenberg, A Family History," 1992) indicates that after the failure of Stauffenberg's bomb plot in July 1944, Gisevius went into hiding until 23 January 1945, when he escaped to Switzerland by using a passport that had belonged to Carl Deichmann, a brother-in-law of German Count Helmuth James von Moltke, who was a specialist in international law serving in the legal branch of the Foreign Countries Group of the OKW (Oberkommando der Wehrmacht, "Supreme Command of the Armed Forces"). Through the help of the American Allen Dulles in Berne, Switzerland and of the German Legation (in Berne)'s Georg Federer, the passport was modified and a visa obtained for Gisevius that enabled him to escape to Spain.

== Later life ==
Gisevius served as a key witness for the defence at the Nuremberg trials when he was called as a witness by defendants Hjalmar Schacht and Wilhelm Frick. His testimony was crucial in securing the acquittal of Schacht on all counts, but Frick was found guilty and executed. His testimony was also particularly damaging to Hermann Göring, Wilhelm Keitel and Ernst Kaltenbrunner, who were all convicted and sentenced to death.

His autobiography, Bis zum bitteren Ende ("To the Bitter End"), published by Wasmuth in 1948, offered a sharp indictment of both the Nazi regime, many of whose leading members Gisevius knew personally, and the German people. Gisevius claimed that the latter pretended not to know about the atrocities being committed in their name. At the same time, the book also offers an insider's account of the German resistance movement.

In 1946, Gisevius was charged and acquitted by the Swiss authorities in a trial for espionage. Gisevius was later criticised as he diminished the contributions of other members (such as Claus Schenk Graf von Stauffenberg) of the opposition to Hitler. Gisevius wrote in his 1948 book that he considered SS Chief Himmler somewhat of a hypocrite whereas he saw Reinhard Heydrich as one who epitomised Nazi ideals. In the early 1950s, he moved to the United States and lived in Dallas, Texas, but soon moved to Switzerland. Gisevius died in Müllheim in Baden-Württemberg in 1974.

== Works ==
- Gisevius H.B. (1946). Bis zum bitteren Ende (in German). (Translated in English editions as 'To the Bitter End', and more recently republished in English as "Valkyrie" to capitalize on the film of the same name)
- Gisevius H.B. (1966). Wo ist Nebe?. Droemer. (The title means Where is Nebe?, Nebe being Arthur Nebe)
- Kitchen, Martin (1994). Nazi Germany at War. New York and London: Routledge.
