= Erwin von Witzleben =

Field Marshal of Nazi Germany (1881–1944)

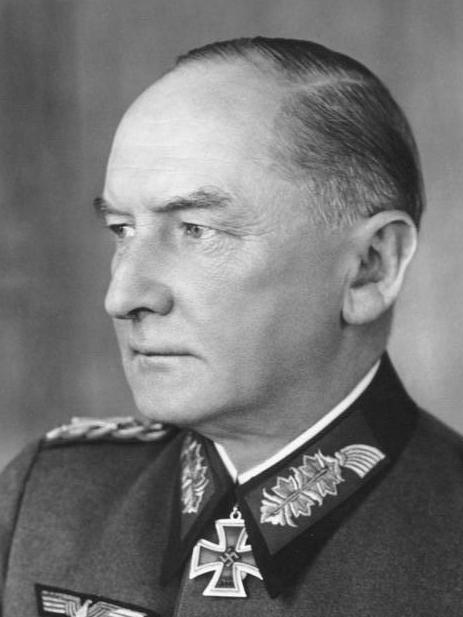
- Witzleben, c. 1940–1941
- Born: 4 December 1881; Breslau, Silesia, Prussia, Germany (present-day Wrocław, Poland)
- Died: 8 August 1944 (aged 62); Plötzensee Prison, Berlin, Germany
- Military career
- Allegiance: Prussia; Germany
- Branch: Imperial German Army; Prussian Army; Reichswehr; German Army
- Service years: 1901–1944
- Rank: Generalfeldmarschall
- Commands: 1st Army; OB West
- Conflicts: World War I; Battle of Verdun; Battle of Champagne; World War II; Saar Offensive; Battle of France; German resistance to Nazism
- Awards: Knight's Cross of the Iron Cross

Erwin von Witzleben (4 December 1881 – 8 August 1944) was a German Generalfeldmarschall ('field marshal') in the Wehrmacht and Oberbefehlshaber West ('commander in chief in the west', abbreviated to OB West), during the Second World War. A leading conspirator in the 20 July plot to assassinate Adolf Hitler, he was designated to become commander in chief of the Wehrmacht in a post-Nazi regime, had the plot succeeded. After being dishonourably discharged by the Court of Military Honour, he was executed, after a show trial by the People's Court.

== Early years ==
Erwin von Witzleben was born in Breslau (now Wrocław, Poland) in the Prussian province of Silesia, the son of Job Wilhelm Georg Friedrich Erdmann von Witzleben (1838–1898), a Hauptmann ('captain') in the Prussian Army, and his wife, Therese, née Brandenburg. The Witzleben family was an Uradel family of old nobility and many military officers, originating in Witzleben, Thuringia.

Witzleben completed the Prussian Cadet Corps program at Liegnitz Ritter-Akademie in Silesia and in Lichterfelde near Berlin, and on 22 June 1901 joined Grenadier Regiment König Wilhelm I No. 7 in Liegnitz, Silesia (now Legnica, Poland) as a Leutnant ('lieutenant'). In 1910, he was promoted to Oberleutnant ('first lieutenant').

On 21 May 1907, he married Alma Else Margarethe Kleeberg (1885–1942) from Chemnitz, Saxony, with whom he had a son and a daughter.

== First World War ==
At the beginning of the First World War, Witzleben served as brigade adjutant in the 19th Reserve Infantry Brigade before being promoted to Hauptmann and company chief in Reserve Infantry Regiment No. 6 in October 1914. Later, in the same regiment, he became a battalion commander. His unit fought at Verdun, in the Champagne region, and in Flanders, among other places. He was seriously wounded and was awarded the Iron Cross, both first and second class. Afterwards, he was sent to General Staff training and witnessed the war's end as First General Staff Officer of the 121st Division.

== Interwar years ==
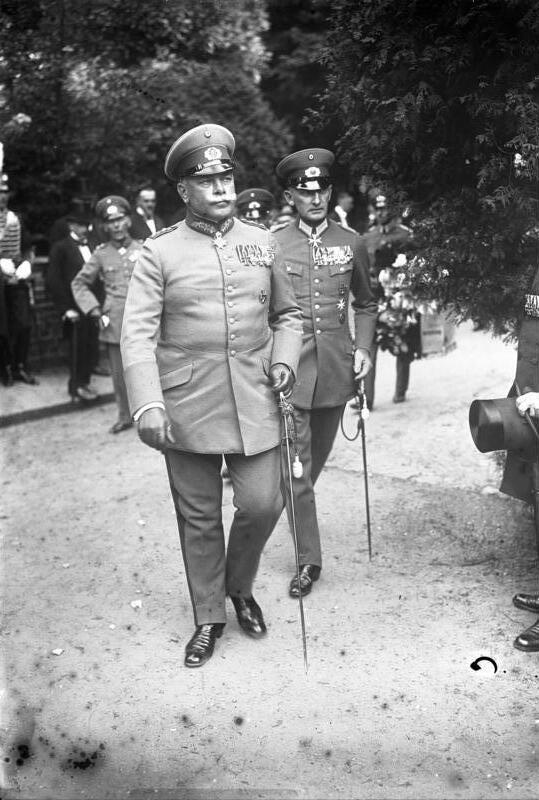
Witzleben (right) with Reichswehr Generaloberst Wilhelm Heye, c. 1930

Retained in the Reichswehr following the end of the war, Witzleben first held a company commander position. In 1923, he was a Major on the staff of the Fourth Division in Dresden. In 1928, he became a battalion commander in the 6th Infantry Regiment and retained that position as Oberstleutnant ('lieutenant colonel') the following year. After his promotion to Oberst ('colonel') in 1931, he became commanding officer of the 8th (Prussian) Infantry Regiment in Frankfurt an der Oder.

Shortly before Adolf Hitler seized power with the Enabling Act of 1933, Witzleben became commanding officer of Infanterieführer VI in Hanover. He was promoted to Generalmajor ('major general') on 1 February 1934 and moved to Potsdam as the new commander of the 3rd Infantry Division. He succeeded General Werner von Fritsch as commander of Wehrkreis III, a role he held from 1934 to 1938. He was promoted to Generalleutnant ('lieutenant general') and, in the newly established Wehrmacht, became commander of III Army Corps in Berlin in September 1935. In 1936, he was promoted to General der Infanterie ('general of infantry').

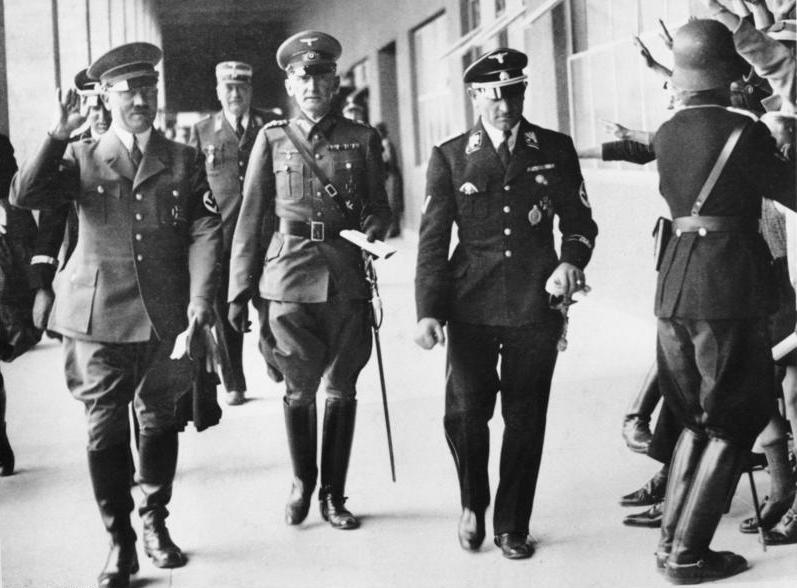
Hitler, Witzleben and SS-Obergruppenführer Sepp Dietrich at the 1936 Summer Olympics

As early as 1934, Witzleben showed his opposition to the Nazi regime when he and Generals Erich von Manstein, Wilhelm Ritter von Leeb, and Gerd von Rundstedt demanded an inquiry into the deaths of Generals Kurt von Schleicher and Ferdinand von Bredow during the Night of the Long Knives.

Starting in 1937, Witzleben was a member of the Oster Conspiracy, a group of plotters that included Generaloberst ('colonel general') Ludwig Beck, Generals Erich Hoepner and Carl-Heinrich von Stülpnagel, Admiral and Chief of the Abwehr Wilhelm Canaris, and Abwehr Oberstleutnant ('lieutenant colonel') Hans Oster. The men planned to overthrow Hitler in a military coup d'état and avert another European war, which seemed highly likely during the 1938 Sudetenland Crisis, until the Munich Agreement both shocked and demoralized the plotters. Witzleben's units, which garrisoned the Berlin Defense District, were to have played a decisive role in the planned coup.

In November 1938, Witzleben handed over command of the III Army Corps to General of the Artillery Curt Haase and was installed as commander-in-chief of Army Group Command 2 based in Frankfurt. (Note: General der Infanterie Wilhelm Adam was his predecessor.) He was also involved in Generaloberst Kurt Freiherr von Hammerstein-Equord's conspiracy plans of 1939. Hammerstein-Equord planned to seize Hitler outright in a frontal assault while Witzleben would shut down the Nazi headquarters, but this plan was also abandoned. During mobilization for the invasion of Poland (which sparked World War II), Witzleben took command of the new 1st Army in the west (see Phoney War). In this position, he was promoted to colonel general on 1 November 1939.

== Second World War ==
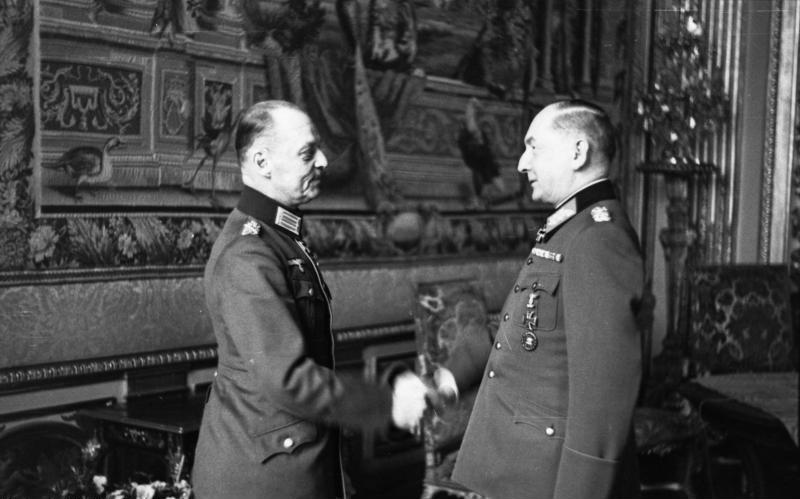
Field Marshals Rundstedt and Witzleben in France, March 1941

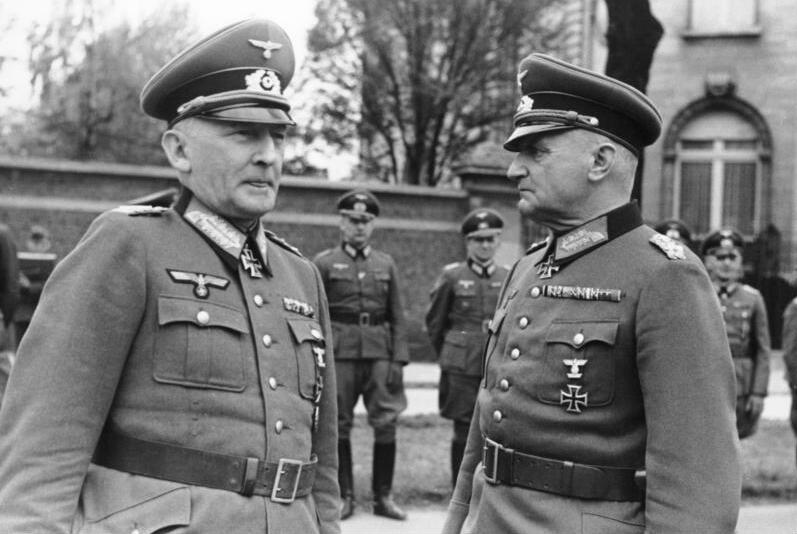
Witzleben as the commander of OB West with Generaloberst Curt Haase, commander of the 15th Army, May 1941

In September 1939, Witzleben, then a Generaloberst, took command of the 1st Army, stationed on the Western Front. When Germany attacked France on 10 May 1940, the First Army was part of Army Group C. On 14 June it broke through the Maginot Line and, within three days, had forced several French divisions to surrender. For this, Witzleben was decorated with the Knight's Cross of the Iron Cross and, on 19 July, was promoted to Generalfeldmarschall ('field marshal') during the 1940 Field Marshal Ceremony.

On 1 May 1941 he was appointed Commander-in-Chief OB West, succeeding Generalfeldmarschall Rundstedt, who was to command the Army Group South on the Eastern Front. Witzleben criticized the Nazi regime for beginning its invasion of the Soviet Union (Operation Barbarossa, which started the German-Soviet War on 22 June 1941).

In February 1942 he had surgery. On 15 March 1942 his wife died of cancer, and he took leave from the position of OB West for health reasons.

=== 20 July 1944 ===
In 1944, the conspirators around Claus von Stauffenberg saw Witzleben as the key man in their plans. Generaloberst Beck was seen as a prospective provisional head of state, and Generaloberst Hoepner was in line to command the inner Ersatzheer ('replacement army') forces. Witzleben was to become commander-in-chief of the Wehrmacht, the ranking officer of the new regime.

However, on 20 July 1944, the day of Stauffenberg's attempt on Hitler's life at the Wolf's Lair in East Prussia, Witzleben did not arrive at the Bendlerblock in Berlin from the OKH-HQ (Oberkommando des Heeres headquarters) at Zossen to assume command of the coup forces until 8 pm, when it was already clear that the coup had failed. He then protested angrily that it had been bungled and left after 45 minutes to return to Zossen, where he reported the situation to General der Artillerie Eduard Wagner and then drove back to his country estate, 48 kilometres (30 mi) away, where he was arrested the next day by Generalleutnant Viktor Linnarz of the OKH personnel office.

He was then cast out of the Wehrmacht by the Ehrenhof ('court of honour'), a conclave of officers set up after the attempted assassination to remove officers who had been involved in the plot, mainly so they would no longer be subject to German military law and could be arraigned in a show trial before the Volksgerichtshof headed by Roland Freisler.

=== Trial and execution ===
On 7 August 1944, Witzleben was in the first group of accused conspirators to be brought before the Volksgerichtshof. Ravaged by the conditions of his Gestapo arrest, and denied both a belt and his false teeth, he surprisingly approached the bench giving the Nazi salute, for which he was rebuked by the presiding judge, Roland Freisler.

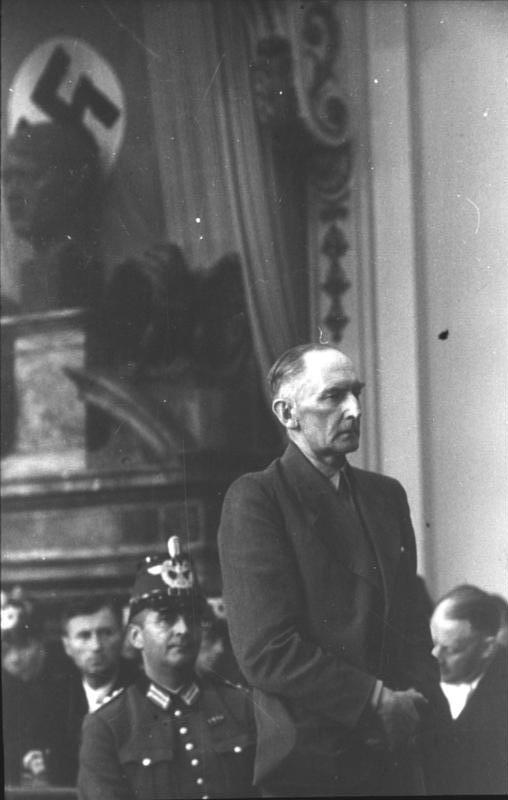
Witzleben on trial at the Volksgerichtshof

Witzleben was sentenced to death on the same day. Witzleben gave these closing words in court, addressed to Freisler:

You can turn us over to the executioner. In three months the outraged and tormented people will call you to account and drag you through the filth in the streets alive.

Much of the court proceedings, including scenes of Witzleben's trial, were filmed for the German weekly newsreel Die Deutsche Wochenschau; however, Propaganda Minister Joseph Goebbels decided against releasing the footage, firstly because Freisler's abusive ranting in the courtroom might draw sympathy for the accused, and secondly because the regime wanted to quell public discussion of the event. The material was classified as secret (Geheime Reichssache).

Witzleben was put to death the same day at Plötzensee Prison in Berlin. By Hitler's direct orders he was hanged from a meat hook with a thin hemp rope, often mistakenly reported as a piano wire, and the execution was filmed, though the footage has since been lost.

Following his execution for treason, his family was stripped of pension claims and subsequently lived in poverty well into the post-war years.

== Decorations ==
- Iron Cross (1914)
  - 2nd Class
  - 1st Class
- Wound Badge (1914)
  - in Black
- Knight's Cross of the House Order of Hohenzollern
- Knight of Justice of the Order of Saint John
- Honour Cross of the World War 1914/1918
- Sudetenland Medal
- West Wall Medal
- Clasp to the Iron Cross (1939)
  - 2nd Class
  - 1st Class
- Knight's Cross of the Iron Cross on 24 June 1940 as Generaloberst and commander of 1. Armee
- Military Merit Order, 4th class with Swords (Bavaria)
- Hanseatic Cross of Hamburg
- Cross of Honour 3rd Class with swords and crown (Reuss)
- Wound Badge of 1918 in Black
- Prussian Service Award Cross
- Silesian Eagle, 2nd class
- Knight of Honour of the Order of Saint John
- Wehrmacht Long Service Award, 1st class with Oak Leaves
- German Olympic Decoration, 1st class

== Depiction in media ==
- Witzleben's role in the 1944 plot to overthrow Hitler is depicted in a novel published by William L. Shirer, and described at much greater length in Shirer's 1960 history of Nazi Germany, The Rise and Fall of the Third Reich.
- East German actor Otto Dierichs depicted Witzleben in the 1970 Eastern Bloc co-production Liberation.
- Joachim Bißmeier portrays Witzleben in the 2004 TV film, Stauffenberg.
- English actor David Schofield portrays Witzleben in the 2008 film Valkyrie.

== See also ==
- Assassination attempts on Adolf Hitler

== Sources ==
- "Generalfeldmarschall Job Wilhelm Georg Erdmann Erwin von Witzleben" (in German). Archived from the original on 31 May 2014.
- "Biografie" [Biography]. Erwin-von-Witzleben-Gesellschaft (in German). "Auf Betreiben des Generalstabchefs des Heeres, Franz Halder, wird Witzleben aus 'gesundheitlichen Gründen' von Hitler selbst in die Führerreserve des Oberkommandos des Heeres (OKH) versetzt, weil er Halder zu gefährlich wurde. (At the instigation of the Chief of the General Staff of the Army, Franz Halder, Witzleben is transferred by Hitler himself to the Führerreserve of the High Command of the Army (OKH) for 'health reasons' because he had become too dangerous for Halder.)"
- Fellgiebel, Walther-Peer (2000) [1986]. Die Träger des Ritterkreuzes des Eisernen Kreuzes 1939–1945 — Die Inhaber der höchsten Auszeichnung des Zweiten Weltkrieges aller Wehrmachtteile [The Bearers of the Knight's Cross of the Iron Cross 1939–1945 – The Owners of the Highest Award of the Second World War of all Wehrmacht Branches] (in German). Friedberg, Germany: Podzun-Pallas. ISBN 978-3-7909-0284-6.
- Fest, Joachim (10 July 1994). "Aufgehängt wie Schlachtvieh" [Hung up Like Slaughter Cattle]. Der Spiegel (in German).
- Helmecke, Chris (3 July 2024). "Auftrag: Hitler töten! Attentatspläne und -versuche von Militärs" [Mission: Kill Hitler! Assassination Plans and Attempts by the Military]. Bundeswehr. "Der für Hitler unbequeme Oberbefehlshaber Witzleben erkrankte kurz darauf und wurde im März 1942 in die sogenannte Führerreserve versetzt – offiziell aus gesundheitlichen Gründen, tatsächlich wegen des Verdachts seiner oppositionellen Bestrebungen. (Witzleben, the commander-in-chief who was inconvenient for Hitler, fell ill shortly afterwards and was transferred to the so-called Führerreserve in March 1942 – officially for health reasons, but in reality because of suspicions of his opposition activities.)"
- Koch, Hannsjoachim Wolfgang (15 November 1997). In the Name of the Volk: Political Justice in Hitler's Germany. I. B. Tauris. ISBN 978-1-860-64174-9. OL 8626983M.
- Manvell, Roger; Fraenkel, Heinrich (1966). The Men Who Tried to Kill Hitler. New York: Pocket Books.
- Oleschinski, Brigitte (2002). Plötzensee Memorial Center (PDF). Translated by Grossman, John. Berlin: German Resistance Memorial Center. p. 35. Archived from the original (PDF) on 4 March 2004. "Inmate Viktor von Gostomski [...] recorded his observations: '[...] SS men were filming. [...] The Gestapo people were in the shed, and so was the cameraman.'"
- Reichswehrministerium, ed. (1930). Rangliste des Deutschen Reichsheeres (in German). Berlin: Mittler & Sohn Verlag. OCLC 10573418.
- Shirer, William Lawrence (1950). The Traitor. New York: Farrar, Straus. LCCN 50010771. OCLC 1286216. OL 6071595M.
- Shirer, William Lawrence (1960). The Rise and Fall of the Third Reich: A History of Nazi Germany. New York City: Simon & Schuster. ASIN B0766DKDLR. LCCN 60006729. OCLC 1286630. OL 5794925M. Wikidata Q138029595.
- Friedrich Ebert Foundation 2007, Widerstand gegen das NS-Regime in den Regionen Mecklenburg und Vorpommern
  - Mario Niemann, Der 20. Juli 1944 in Mecklenburg und Pommern (online)
- Wistrich, Robert Solomon (2001). "Witzleben, Erwin von (1881–1944): General Field Marshal of the Wehrmacht". Who's Who in Nazi Germany. Routledge. pp. 279–280. "His execution on 8 August 1944 was a particularly grisly affair. The 63-year-old field marshal was pushed into a cellar at Berlin's Plötzensee prison, placed under a meat hook and, half-naked with a running noose around his head, he was lifted and slowly strangled."

Military offices
| Preceded by none | Commander of 1. Armee; 26 August 1939 – 23 October 1940 | Succeeded by General Johannes Blaskowitz |
| Preceded by Generalfeldmarschall Gerd von Rundstedt | Oberbefehlshaber West; 1 May 1941 – 15 March 1942 | Succeeded by Generalfeldmarschall Gerd von Rundstedt |
