= Carl-Heinrich von Stülpnagel =

German Wehrmacht Heer general (1886–1944)

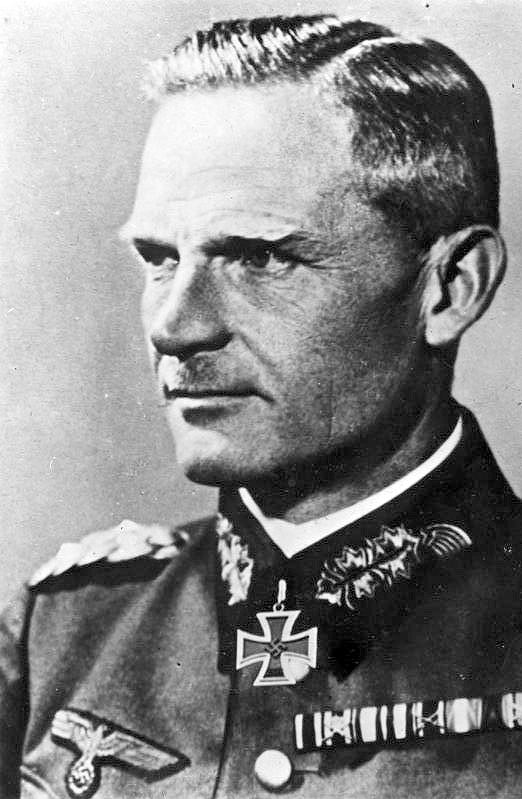
- Stülpnagel in 1941
- Born: 2 January 1886; Berlin, German Empire
- Died: 30 August 1944 (aged 58); Plötzensee Prison, Berlin, Nazi Germany
- Relatives: Otto von Stülpnagel (cousin)
- Military career
- Allegiance: German Empire; Weimar Republic; Nazi Germany
- Branch: Imperial German Army; Reichswehr; German Army
- Service years: 1904–1944
- Rank: General der Infanterie
- Commands: 17th Army
- Conflicts: World War I World War II
- Awards: Knight's Cross of the Iron Cross; German Cross in silver
- Criminal information
- Cause of death: Execution by hanging

Carl-Heinrich Rudolf Wilhelm von Stülpnagel (2 January 1886 – 30 August 1944) was a German general in the Wehrmacht's Heer (the army controlled by the Wehrmacht) during World War II who was an army level commander. While serving as military commander of German-occupied France and as commander of the 17th Army in the Soviet Union during Operation Barbarossa, Stülpnagel participated in German war crimes, including authorising reprisal operations against civilian population and cooperating with the Einsatzgruppen in their mass murder of Jews. He was a member of the 20 July Plot to assassinate Adolf Hitler, being in charge of the conspirators' actions in France. After the failure of the plot, he was recalled to Berlin and attempted to commit suicide en route, but failed. Tried on 30 August 1944, he was convicted of treason and executed on the same day.

== Early life ==
Born in Berlin into a noble family, Stülpnagel joined the Prussian Army straight from school in 1904, and served as a general staff officer in World War I. After the war, he served in the Reichswehr reaching the rank of Colonel in 1933. The same year, he was appointed head of the 'Foreign Armies' branch of the General Staff of the Army. In 1935, he published a memorandum in which he combined anti-Bolshevism with anti-Semitism. By 1936 he was a Major General and commanded the 30th Infantry Division in Lübeck.

On 27 August 1937, as a Lieutenant General, he was appointed Deputy Chief of the General Staff of the Army. In 1938, after the Blomberg-Fritsch affair and the Sudeten Crisis, he established contact with the Schwarze Kapelle, revealing the secret plan for the invasion of Czechoslovakia. Stülpnagel took part in the military opposition's first plans to remove Hitler from power, but the plans were largely abandoned after the Munich Agreement.

== World War II ==
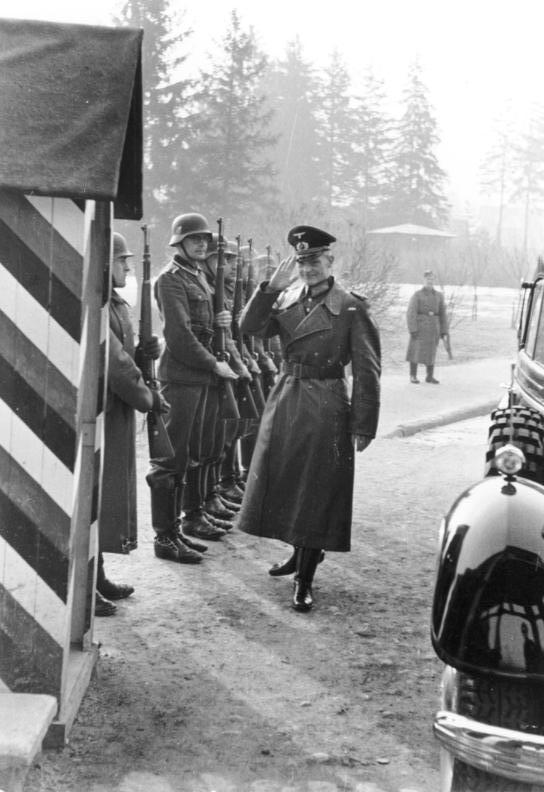
Stülpnagel in German-occupied Poland, 1941

From 20 December 1940 to 4 October 1941, Stülpnagel was a General of Infantry (April 1939) and commanded the 17th Army. On 22 June 1941, after the launch of Operation Barbarossa, he successfully led this army across southern Russia on the Eastern Front. Under Stülpnagel's command, the 17th Army achieved victory during the Battle of Uman and the Battle of Kiev.

In February 1942, Stülpnagel was made German-occupied France's military commander, in succession to his cousin, Gen. Otto von Stülpnagel. In this position, he, along with his personal adviser Lieutenant-Colonel Caesar von Hofacker, continued to maintain contact with other members of the conspiracy against Hitler.

=== War crimes ===
Substantial archival evidence indicates that during his tenure as commander of the 17th Army and military governor of France, Stülpnagel was involved in war crimes. According to Richard J. Evans, he ordered that future reprisals for French Resistance activities would be mass arrests and deportations of Jews. Following an attack on German soldiers, Stülpnagel ordered the arrest of 743 Jews, mostly French and had them interned at a German-run camp at Compiègne; another 369 Jewish prisoners were deported to Auschwitz in March 1942. In the Soviet Union, Stülpnagel signed many orders authorizing reprisals against civilians for partisan attacks and closely collaborated with the Einsatzgruppen in their mass executions of Jews. He admonished his soldiers not for the massacre of the civilian population, but for chaotic means in which it was undertaken, particularly early premature taking hostages and random measures. He ordered his troops to focus on Jews and Communist civilians, remarking that Communists were Jews that needed capture anyways.

=== 20 July plot ===
On the day in question, 20 July 1944, Stülpnagel put his part of the plot into operation. This mainly involved having Hans Otfried von Linstow, who was only informed of the plot on that same day, round up all SS and Gestapo officers in Paris and imprison them. However, when it became apparent that the assassination attempt in East Prussia had failed, Stülpnagel was unable to convince Field Marshal Günther von Kluge to support the uprising and was forced to release his prisoners. When Stülpnagel was recalled from Paris, he stopped at Verdun and tried to kill himself by shooting himself in the head with a pistol on the banks of the Meuse River. He only succeeded in blinding himself, and in the aftermath he was heard muttering repeatedly in delirium "Rommel", making himself the first to implicate the Field Marshal named as a party to the plot, leading ultimately to the latter's forced suicide.

Stülpnagel and his adviser were both arrested by the Gestapo, and Stülpnagel was brought before the Volksgerichtshof (People's Court) on 30 August 1944 where he was berated by Roland Freisler. He was found guilty of high treason and hanged the same day at Plötzensee Prison in Berlin.

== Awards and decorations ==
- Knight's Cross of the House Order of Hohenzollern with swords
- Iron Cross (1914) 2nd and 1st class
- Wound Badge (1918) in black
- General Honor Decoration of Hesse
- Hanseatic Cross of Hamburg
- Order of Henry the Lion 4th class
- Military Merit Cross of Austria-Hungary, 3rd class with war decoration
- Order of Military Merit of Bulgaria 4th class
- Honour Cross of the World War 1914/1918
- Clasp to the Iron Cross 2nd and 1st class
- German Cross in silver 14 February 1944
- War Merit Cross 2nd and 1st class with swords
- Knight's Cross of the Iron Cross on 21 August 1941 as General of the Infantry and commander-in-chief of the 17th Army

== See also ==
- Otto von Stülpnagel - cousin and German military commander of occupied France

== Sources ==
- Cave Brown, Anthony. Bodyguard of Lies, (Harper & Row, 1975)
- Koehn, Barbara. Carl-Heinrich von Stülpnagel. Offizier und Widerstandskämpfer. Eine Verteidigung (2008); scholarly biography in German
- Fellgiebel, Walther-Peer (2000) [1986]. Die Träger des Ritterkreuzes des Eisernen Kreuzes 1939–1945 [The Bearers of the Knight's Cross of the Iron Cross 1939–1945] (in German). Friedberg, Germany: Podzun-Pallas. ISBN 978-3-7909-0284-6.
- Knopp, Guido Die Wehrmacht: Eine Bilanz, C. Bertelsmann Verlag, München, 2007. ISBN 978-3-570-00975-8
- Webb, James Jack (2025). Generals and Admirals of the Third Reich: For Country or Fuehrer. Vol. 3: P–Z. Havertown, PA: Casemate Publishers. ISBN 978-1-952-71518-1.

Military offices
Preceded by —	Commander of 30th Infantry Division; 1 October 1936 – 4 February 1938	Succeeded by Generalmajor Kurt von Briesen
Preceded by Generaloberst Adolf Strauss	Commander of II Army Corps; 30 April 1940 – 21 June 1940	Succeeded by General Walter von Brockdorff-Ahlefeldt
Preceded by none	Commander of 17. Armee; 20 December 1940 – 4 October 1941	Succeeded by Generaloberst Hermann Hoth
