= Stauffenberg (film) =

- Written by: Jo Baier
- Directed by: Jo Baier
- Starring: Sebastian Koch; Ulrich Tukur; Hardy Krüger, Jr.
- Music by: Enjott Schneider
- Country of origin: Germany
- Original language: German

Production
- Cinematography: Gunnar Fuss
- Editor: Carla Fabry
- Running time: 92 minutes

Original release
- Network: Das Erste
- Release: 2004

Stauffenberg is a 2004 German–Austrian TV film about Claus Schenk Graf von Stauffenberg and the 20 July 1944 plot to assassinate Adolf Hitler. The film was first broadcast on 25 February 2004 on German TV channel Das Erste (ARD).

Claus Schenk Graf von Stauffenberg becomes an enemy of Hitler's policy, because Generalmajor Henning von Tresckow informs him about German war crimes behind the Russian front. On 20 July 1944 he goes with a time bomb in his briefcase to a conference room at Hitler's headquarter Wolfsschanze near Rastenburg in East Prussia. Four people were killed immediately, but Hitler survived. The film was awarded "best film" at the Deutscher Fernsehpreis (German Television Awards).

The film goes by the international English name of Operation Valkyrie.

== Cast ==
- Sebastian Koch as Claus von Stauffenberg
- Remo Girone as Ludwig Beck
- Ulrich Tukur as Henning Von Tresckow
- David C. Bunners as Albrecht Mertz von Quirnheim
