= Friedrich Olbricht =

German general (1888–1944)

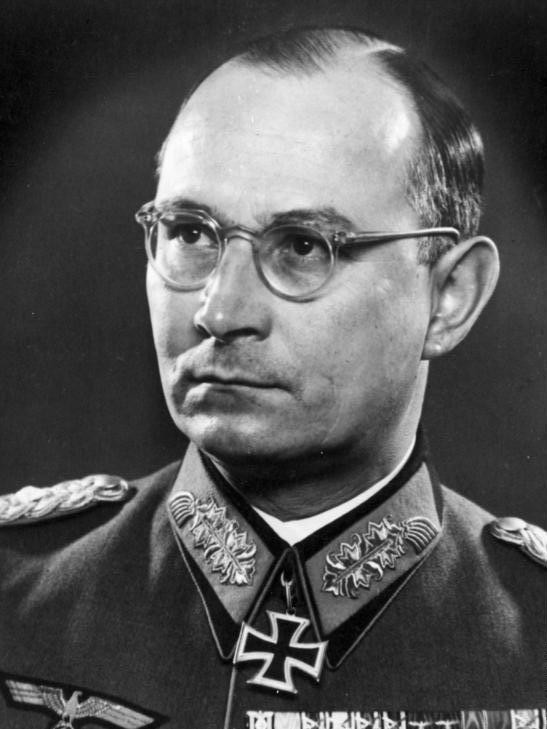
- Olbricht in 1939

Chief of the General Army Office
- In office February 1940 – 21 July 1944
- Preceded by: Friedrich Fromm
- Succeeded by: Office abolished

Personal details
- Born: 4 October 1888 Leisnig, Kingdom of Saxony, German Empire
- Died: 21 July 1944 (aged 55) Berlin, Gau Berlin, Nazi Germany
- Cause of death: Execution by firing squad
- Spouse: Eva Koeppel
- Children: 2
- Awards: Knight's Cross of the Iron Cross

Military service
- Allegiance: German Empire; Weimar Republic; Nazi Germany
- Branch/service: German Army
- Years of service: 1907–1944
- Rank: General der Infanterie
- Commands: 24th Infantry Division
- Battles/wars: World War I; World War II; Invasion of Poland; Battle of France; 20 July Plot

Friedrich Olbricht (4 October 1888 – 21 July 1944) was a German general during World War II. He is known for being one of the plotters involved in the 20 July Plot, an attempt to assassinate Adolf Hitler in 1944.

Born in Leisnig, Olbricht was a senior staff officer, with the rank of infantry general. He was secretly in contact with most of the leaders of the resistance. They briefed him on their various plots and he placed sympathetic officers in key positions. Olbricht quietly encouraged field commanders to support the resistance. By late 1943, his office was the centre of Resistance plotting, under Claus von Stauffenberg. Had the 20 July plot to assassinate Adolf Hitler been successful, Olbricht was positioned to assume the role of minister of war in a post-Nazi regime.

== Early life ==
Friedrich Olbricht was born on 4 October 1888 in Leisnig, Saxony, to Richard Olbricht, a mathematics professor and director of the Realschule (secondary school) in Bautzen.

== Career ==
Olbricht successfully passed the Abitur (university preparatory school exit examination) in 1907, subsequently accepting a commission as a Fähnrich (ensign) with Infantry Regiment 106 in Leipzig. He fought in World War I, was promoted to captain and chose to stay in the Treaty of Versailles-decimated military (the Reichswehr) after the war.

Olbricht was assigned to the Reich Defense Ministry as leader of the Reichswehr's Foreign Armies Bureau in 1926. After the Night of the Long Knives raid, he was able to save several of those arrested from execution by finding or creating positions for them in the Abwehr.

Olbricht was appointed chief of staff of the 4th Army Corps stationed in Dresden in 1935, an assignment that lasted until 1938 when he was promoted to commander of the 24th Infantry Division.

Olbricht has the distinction of being one of the few officers who supported General Werner von Fritsch, the commander in chief of the German armed forces who was accused of homosexuality in January 1938. After von Fritsch’s resignation, it was discovered that the charges had been invented, based on the contrived testimony of a man whom some say was recruited by Himmler. The tale had been concocted as part of Hitler's plan to gain control of the armed forces—which he did.

During the German invasion of Poland in 1939, Olbricht commanded the 24th Infantry Division and was awarded the Knight's Cross of the Iron Cross. On 15 February 1940, Olbricht was promoted to General of the Infantry. He was appointed Chief of the General Army Office (Allgemeines Heeresamt) in the Army High Command (Oberkommando des Heeres). He was furthermore made Chief of the Armed Forces Reserve Office (Wehrersatzamt) at the Oberkommando der Wehrmacht.

== Operation Valkyrie ==
Starting in the winter of 1941–42, Olbricht developed the plan for Operation Valkyrie, a General Staff plan which was ostensibly to be used to put down internal unrest, but was in fact a blueprint for a coup d'état. Together with the resistance circles around Colonel-General Ludwig Beck, Carl Friedrich Goerdeler and Major-General Henning von Tresckow, he worked to find a means of assassinating Adolf Hitler and bring down the Nazi regime. In 1943, he asked that Colonel Claus von Stauffenberg come to work at his office. Stauffenberg would later be the key person in the assassination attempt, with the task of planting the bomb near Hitler.

On the day of the attempted coup, 20 July 1944, Olbricht and Colonel Albrecht Mertz von Quirnheim initiated Operation Valkyrie by mobilizing the Replacement Army. It eventually became clear the briefcase bomb had failed to kill Hitler however, so the plan to seize key sites in Berlin using units from the reserve army, began to falter. Many consider one of the factors which prevented the coup, was the failure of troops to gain control of communications into and out of Berlin. Hitler and his commanders in the Wolfsschanze were able to broadcast a speech after the coup, which led to the quick demise of the coup as a whole. As a result, the Nazi leadership was able to regain control, using its own loyal troops, within a few hours.

=== Arrest and execution ===
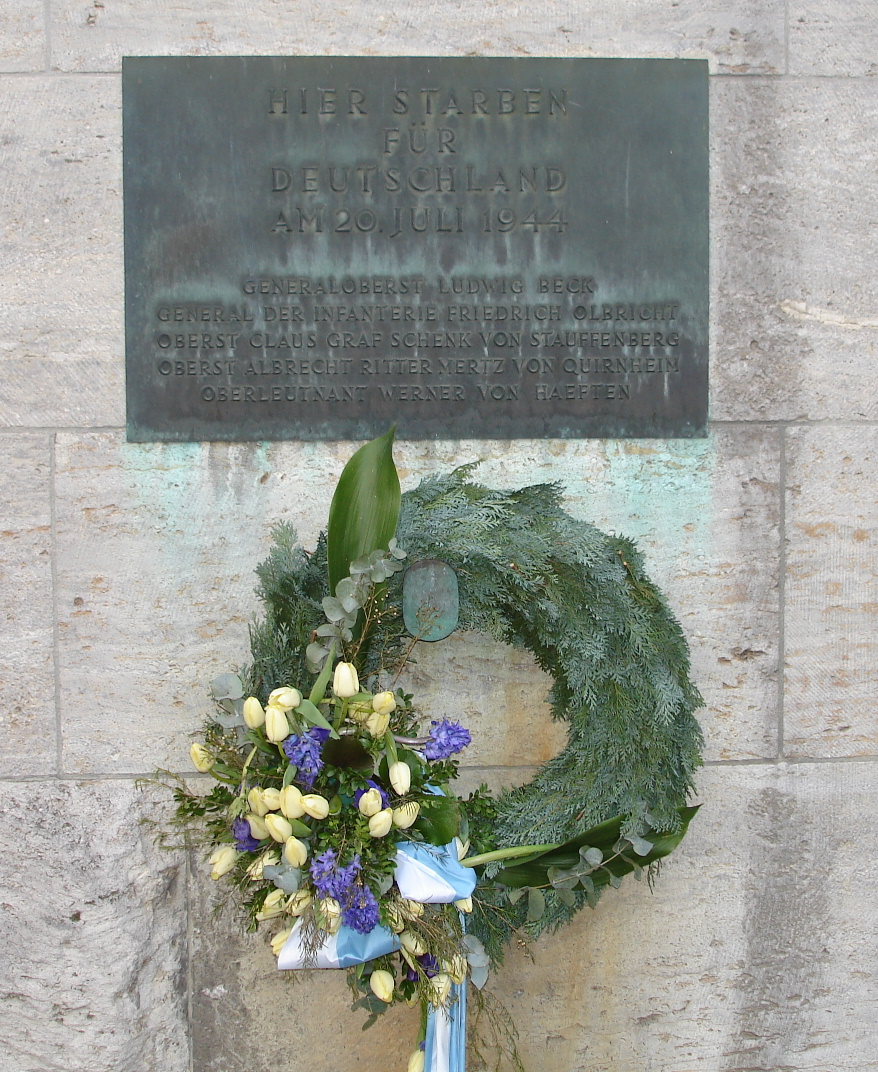
Memorial at Bendlerblock

At 21:00, Olbricht was arrested at his headquarters in the Bendlerblock by soldiers from the Berlin garrison. Later that evening, Colonel-General Friedrich Fromm held a hastily arranged court martial, supposedly in an attempt to protect himself from being exposed as a silent conspirator. Olbricht, Quirnheim, Stauffenberg, and his aide Werner von Haeften were then taken outside to the courtyard and executed by firing squad, against Hitler's orders to take the would-be assassins alive (those who were captured alive received more painful and prolonged means of execution). Olbricht was the first of the four to be shot.

== Personal life ==
He was married to Eva Koeppel, with whom he had a daughter and a son. His daughter Rosemarie Olbricht had married a man named Friedrich Georgi, who also served in the military.

== Awards ==
- Knight's Cross of the Iron Cross on 27 October 1939 as Generalleutnant and commander of 24. Infanterie-Division
- Grand Cross of the Order of the White Rose of Finland on 22 December 1941 as General der Infanterie

== In popular culture ==
Olbricht appears in dramatisations of the July 1944 plot, being played by Rolf Hoppe in the third Liberation film Direction of the Main Blow (1970), Wolfgang Büttner in The Plot to Assassinate Hitler (1955), Erik Frey in Jackboot Mutiny (1955) Michael Byrne in The Plot to Kill Hitler (1990), Rainer Bock in Stauffenberg (2004) and Bill Nighy in Valkyrie (2008).

== See also ==
- List of members of the 20 July plot

Military offices
Preceded by Generalleutnant Sigisimund von Förster	Commander of 24. Infanterie-Division; 10 November 1938 – 15 February 1940	Succeeded by Generalleutnant Justin von Obernitz
