= List of people killed or wounded in the 20 July plot =

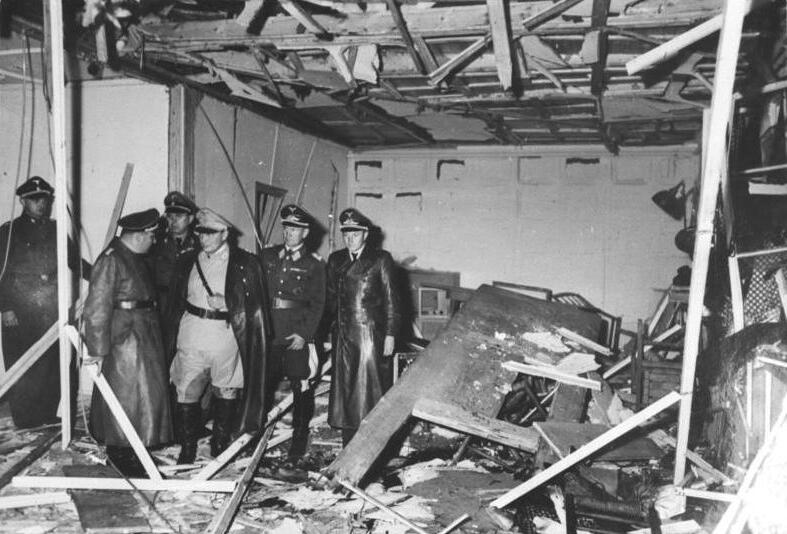
Hermann Göring and Martin Bormann surveying the shattered conference hut shortly after the explosion. Neither man was present during the conference.

People present at the 20 July conference
Outcome	Victims
Slightly injured	7
Injured	10
Seriously injured	3
Killed	4

On 22 June 1944, the Red Army launched a massive attack against the German forces based in Byelorussia, which were made up of two strategic Wehrmacht army groups known as Army Group Centre. By mid July, Army Group Centre had lost no fewer than 250,000 men in less than a month of fighting, making the German position close to hopeless.

In deciding what to do, a series of military conferences were scheduled at the Wolf's Lair headquarters in East Prussia. On 20 July, Adolf Hitler and his top military commanders entered the briefing hut of the headquarters, as the usual bombproof room, with no windows and thick walls of solid concrete, was considered "unbearably hot". In attendance was Colonel Claus von Stauffenberg, who had been severely wounded in 1943 in Tunisia, losing his left eye, right hand and half of his left hand. Undetected by Hitler's ring of bodyguards, Stauffenberg carried a British-made bomb in his briefcase. His plan was to get as close as possible to Hitler, leave the briefcase nearby, and then make an excuse to quickly leave the conference by car with his adjutant and fellow conspirator Werner von Haeften. This was part of a larger planned coup d'état led by a group of army officers who were appalled by the way Hitler was leading Germany in World War II. Everything proceeded according to plan until the bomb exploded, as Stauffenberg walked towards his car, earlier than anticipated. When the explosion tore through the hut, Stauffenberg was thoroughly convinced that no one in the room could possibly have survived. Unbeknownst to Stauffenberg, Colonel Heinz Brandt had moved the briefcase containing the bomb further away from Hitler, placing it behind a solid wooden table leg, as it was in his way. Hitler survived with only minor injuries, as did most of the others present. A stenographer was killed instantly. Three officers, including Brandt, died of their injuries.

Although strictly against security doctrines imposed at the Wolf's Lair, Stauffenberg and Haeften were allowed to pass through all three checkpoints and proceed to the airport, succeeding in getting away before clarity could be established back at the now completely demolished briefing hut. In the last hours of 20 July, Stauffenberg, Haeften, and several other plotters were arrested and summarily condemned to death. The executions were carried out by soldiers under Major Otto Remer early on the morning of 21 July.

Following the assassination attempt, Hitler came to believe that the Wehrmacht leadership could not be trusted; he launched a purge of the officer corps and also used the shock of the attack to round up all the surviving members of the old opposition in the Reichstag. At the same time, those officers who had been injured or killed by the bomb were awarded the 20 July Wound Badge and hailed as heroes. General Günther Korten, General Rudolf Schmundt, Colonel Heinz Brandt and stenographer Heinrich Berger were given a state funeral with a eulogy delivered by Hermann Göring.

== Participants ==
Alphabetically listed per their name
Name	Rank	Position	Years of service	Outcome	Image	Ref.
Adolf Heusinger	Generalleutnant	Chief of the General Staff of the Oberkommando des Heeres (OKH)	1915–1945 and 1955–1964	Slightly injured	A black-and-white photograph of a smiling Heusinger in a military uniform.	
Adolf Hitler	Supreme Commander of the German Armed Forces	Führer und Reichskanzler	1935–1945	Slightly injured	A black-and-white photograph of Hitler in a semi-military uniform.	
Alfred Jodl	Generaloberst	Chief of Staff of the Oberkommando der Wehrmacht (OKW)	1910–1945	Slightly injured	A black-and-white photograph of Jodl in uniform.	
Ernst John von Freyend	Major	Adjutant to Wilhelm Keitel	—	Injured		
Franz von Sonnleithner	Gesandter 1. Klasse	Foreign Ministry representative	—	Injured		
Günther Korten	General der Flieger / Generaloberst (posthumously)	Chief of the General Staff of the Oberkommando der Luftwaffe (OKL)	1914–1944	Died two days later from injuries	A black-and-white photograph of a smiling Korten in a military uniform.	
Hans-Erich Voss	Konteradmiral	Liaison officer	—	Slightly injured		
Heinrich Borgmann	Oberstleutnant	Adjutant to Adolf Hitler	1932–1945	Seriously injured		
Heinz Assmann	Kapitän zur See	Staff officer	—	Injured		
Heinrich Berger	—	Stenographer	1905–1944	Killed outright, with both legs blown off		
Heinz Brandt	Oberst / Generalmajor (posthumously)	Aide-de-camp to Adolf Heusinger	1925–1944	Died one day later from injuries, with one of his legs blown off		
Heinz Buchholz	—	Stenographer	—	Injured		
Heinz Waizenegger	Oberstleutnant	Staff officer	—	Injured		
Herbert Büchs	Major	Adjutant to Alfred Jodl	—	Injured		
Hermann Fegelein	SS-Gruppenführer und Generalleutnant der Waffen-SS	Schutzstaffel (SS) representative	1925–1945	Injured	A black-and-white photograph of Fegelein smiling and wearing a military uniform and a neck order in shape of an Iron Cross.	
Karl Bodenschatz	General der Flieger	Adjutant to Hermann Göring	1910–1945	Seriously injured		
Karl-Jesko von Puttkamer	Konteradmiral	Naval adjutant to Adolf Hitler	1917–1945	Injured		
Nicolaus von Below	Oberst	Luftwaffe adjutant to Adolf Hitler	1929–1945	Injured	A black-and-white photograph of Below wearing a military uniform and adjutant ribbons on his right shoulder.	
Otto Günsche	Sturmbannführer	Schutzstaffel (SS) adjutant and bodyguard to Adolf Hitler	1933–1945	Slightly injured	A black-and-white up-and-front photograph of Günsche in paramilitary uniform.	
Rudolf Schmundt	Generalleutnant / General der Infanterie (posthumously)	Chief of the Army Personnel Office	1914–1944	Severely injured, died from complications on 1 October 1944	A black-and-white photograph of Schmundt smiling and wearing a military uniform.	
Walther Buhle	General der Infanterie	Chief of Army Staff at the Oberkommando der Wehrmacht (OKW)	1914–1944	Injured	A black-and-white up-and-front photograph of Buhle smiling and wearing a military uniform.	
Wilhelm Keitel	Feldmarschall	Chief of the Oberkommando der Wehrmacht (OKW)	1901–1945	Slightly injured	A black-and-white photograph of Keitel wearing a military uniform and a neck order in shape of an Iron Cross.	
Walter Scherff	Generalmajor	Führer's Commissioner for the Writing of Military History	—	Seriously injured		
Walter Warlimont	General der Artillerie	Deputy Chief of Staff of the Oberkommando der Wehrmacht (OKW)	1914–1945	Slightly injured	A black-and-white up-and-front photograph of Warlimont wearing a military uniform.	

== Approximate positions of participants when bomb exploded ==
Approximate positions of the attendees at the meeting in relation to the briefcase bomb when it exploded: 1 Adolf Hitler; 2 Adolf Heusinger; 3 Günther Korten; 4 Heinz Brandt; 5 Karl Bodenschatz; 6 Heinz Waizenegger; 7 Rudolf Schmundt; 8 Heinrich Borgmann; 9 Walther Buhle; 10 Karl-Jesko von Puttkamer; 11 Heinrich Berger; 12 Heinz Assmann; 13 Ernst John von Freyend; 14 Walter Scherff; 15 Hans-Erich Voss; 16 Otto Günsche; 17 Nicolaus von Below; 18 Hermann Fegelein; 19 Heinz Buchholz; 20 Herbert Büchs; 21 Franz von Sonnleithner; 22 Walter Warlimont; 23 Alfred Jodl; 24 Wilhelm Keitel.

== See also ==
- Operation Valkyrie
- List of members of the 20 July plot

== Sources ==
=== Printed ===
- Domarus, Max (2004). Speeches and Proclamations, 1932–1945. University of Virginia. ISBN 978-0865162310.
- Eberle, Henrik; Uhl, Matthias (2009). The Hitler Book: The Secret Dossier Prepared for Stalin. PublicAffairs. ISBN 978-0786734917.
- Hamilton, Charles (1984). Leaders & Personalities of the Third Reich. R. James Bender Publishing. ISBN 0-912138-27-0.
- Hoffmann, Peter (1996). History of the German Resistance, 1933–1945. McGill-Queen's Press. ISBN 978-0773566408.
- Housden, Martyn (2013). Resistance and Conformity in the Third Reich. Routledge. ISBN 978-1134808465.
- Kershaw, Ian (2008). Hitler: A Biography. W. W. Norton & Company. ISBN 978-0-393-06757-6.
- Miller, Michael (2006). Leaders of the SS and German Police. R. James Bender Publishing. ISBN 978-93-297-0037-2.
- Moorhouse, Roger (2010). Berlin at War. Basic Books. ISBN 978-0465022755.
- Short, Neil; Dennis, Peter (2013). Kill Hitler – Operation Valkyrie 1944. Osprey Publishing. ISBN 978-1780962603.
- Shirer, William L. (1960). The Rise and Fall of the Third Reich. New York: Simon & Schuster. LCCN 60-6729.
- Weinberg, Gerhard (2013). Hitler's Foreign Policy 1933–1939: The Road to World War II. Enigma Books. ISBN 978-1936274840.
- Williamson, Gordon (2002a). World War II German Battle Insignia. Osprey Publishing. ISBN 978-1841763521.
- Williamson, Gordon (2002b). German Army Elite. Osprey Publishing. ISBN 978-1841764054.
- Zaloga, Steven (1996). Bagration 1944: The Destruction of Army Group Centre. Osprey Publishing. ISBN 978-1-85532-478-7.
- Zeimke, Earl (2014). From Stalingrad to Berlin. Pen & Sword. ISBN 978-1473848085.

=== Online ===
- Jean-Pierre Isbouts (writer, director) William A. Schwartz (creator, producer) (2008). Operation Valkyrie - Stauffenberg's Plot to Kill Hitler (television documentary). Koch Entertainment.
- Jonathan Martin (writer) Tim Newark (historical advisor) (2009). Attempts to Kill Hitler at the Wolf's Lair (television documentary). World Media Rights.
- "Hitler Plot "Heroes" Commemorated". BBC News. 2004.
