= 20 July plot =

1944 attempted assassination of Adolf Hitler

- Part of the Assassination attempts on Adolf Hitler and German resistance to Nazism
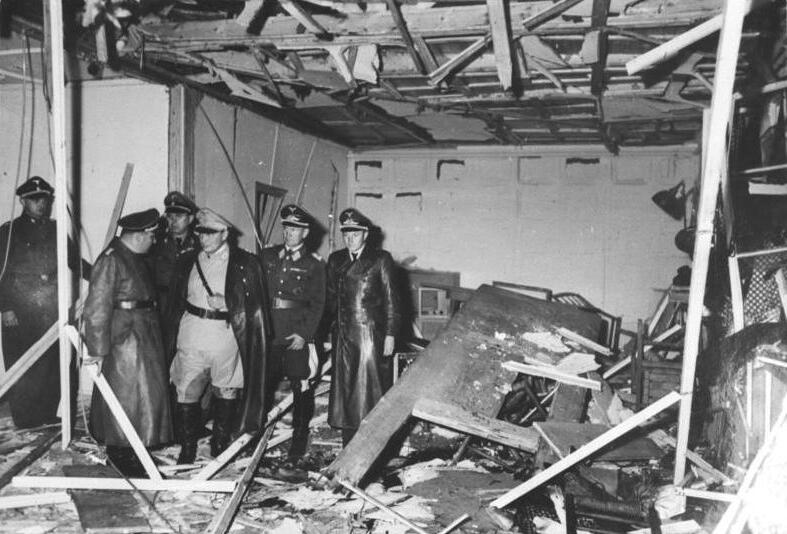
- Martin Bormann, Hermann Göring, and Bruno Loerzer surveying the damaged conference room
- Type: Coup d'état
- Locations: Several, including Wolf's Lair, East Prussia; 54°04′50″N 21°29′47″E and Berlin
- Objective: Assassinate Adolf Hitler; Ensure continuity of government; Make peace with the Western Allies
- Date: 20 July 1944; 82 years ago
- Executed by: Friedrich Olbricht; Erwin von Witzleben; Claus von Stauffenberg; among others…
- Outcome: Hitler survives with minor injuries; Military coup fails within 5 hours; 7,000 arrested; 4,980 executed, including 200 conspirators; Traditional military salute fully replaced by Nazi salute
- Casualties: 4 killed, 20 injured
- The location of the assassination attempt on Hitler

The 20 July plot, sometimes referred to as Operation Valkyrie (German: Unternehmen Walküre), was a failed attempt to assassinate Adolf Hitler, the dictator of Nazi Germany, and overthrow the Nazi government on 20 July 1944. The plotters were part of the German resistance, mainly composed of Wehrmacht officers. The principal mastermind of the conspiracy, Claus von Stauffenberg, tried to kill Hitler by detonating an explosive hidden in a briefcase. However, due to the location of the bomb at the time of detonation, the blast only dealt Hitler minor injuries. The planners' subsequent coup attempt also failed and resulted in a purge of the Wehrmacht.

As early as 1938, German military officers had plotted to overthrow Hitler, but indecisive leadership and the pace of global events stymied action. Plotters gained a sense of urgency in 1943 after Germany lost the critical Battle of Stalingrad and Soviet forces began to push towards Germany. Under the leadership of Stauffenberg, plotters tried to assassinate Hitler at least five times in 1943 and 1944. With the Nazi secret police, the Gestapo, closing in on the plotters, a final attempt was organised in July 1944. Stauffenberg personally took a briefcase containing a block of plastic explosive to a conference in the Wolf's Lair (German: Wolfsschanze), the bunker complex and military headquarters then located in eastern Prussia. The explosives were armed and placed next to Hitler, but it appears they were moved unwittingly at the last moment behind a table leg by Heinz Brandt, inadvertently saving Hitler's life. When the bomb detonated, it killed Brandt and two others, while the rest of the room's occupants were injured, one of whom, Rudolf Schmundt, later died from his injuries. Hitler's trousers were singed by the blast, and he suffered a perforated eardrum and conjunctivitis, but was otherwise unharmed.

The plotters, unaware of their failure, then attempted a coup d'état. A few hours after the blast, the conspiracy used Wehrmacht units to take control of several cities, including Berlin, immediately after giving them disinformation on the intention of the orders they were given. This part of the coup d'état attempt is referred to by the name "Operation Valkyrie", which has also become associated with the entire event. Within hours, the Nazi regime had reasserted its control of Germany. A few members of the conspiracy, including Stauffenberg, were executed by firing squad the same night. In the months after the coup attempt, the Gestapo arrested more than 7,000 people, 4,980 of whom were executed. Roughly 200 conspirators were executed.

The apparent aim of the coup d'état attempt was to wrest political control of Germany and its armed forces from the Nazi Party (including the Schutzstaffel) and to make peace with the Western Allies as soon as possible. The details of the conspirators' peace initiatives remain unknown.

== Background ==
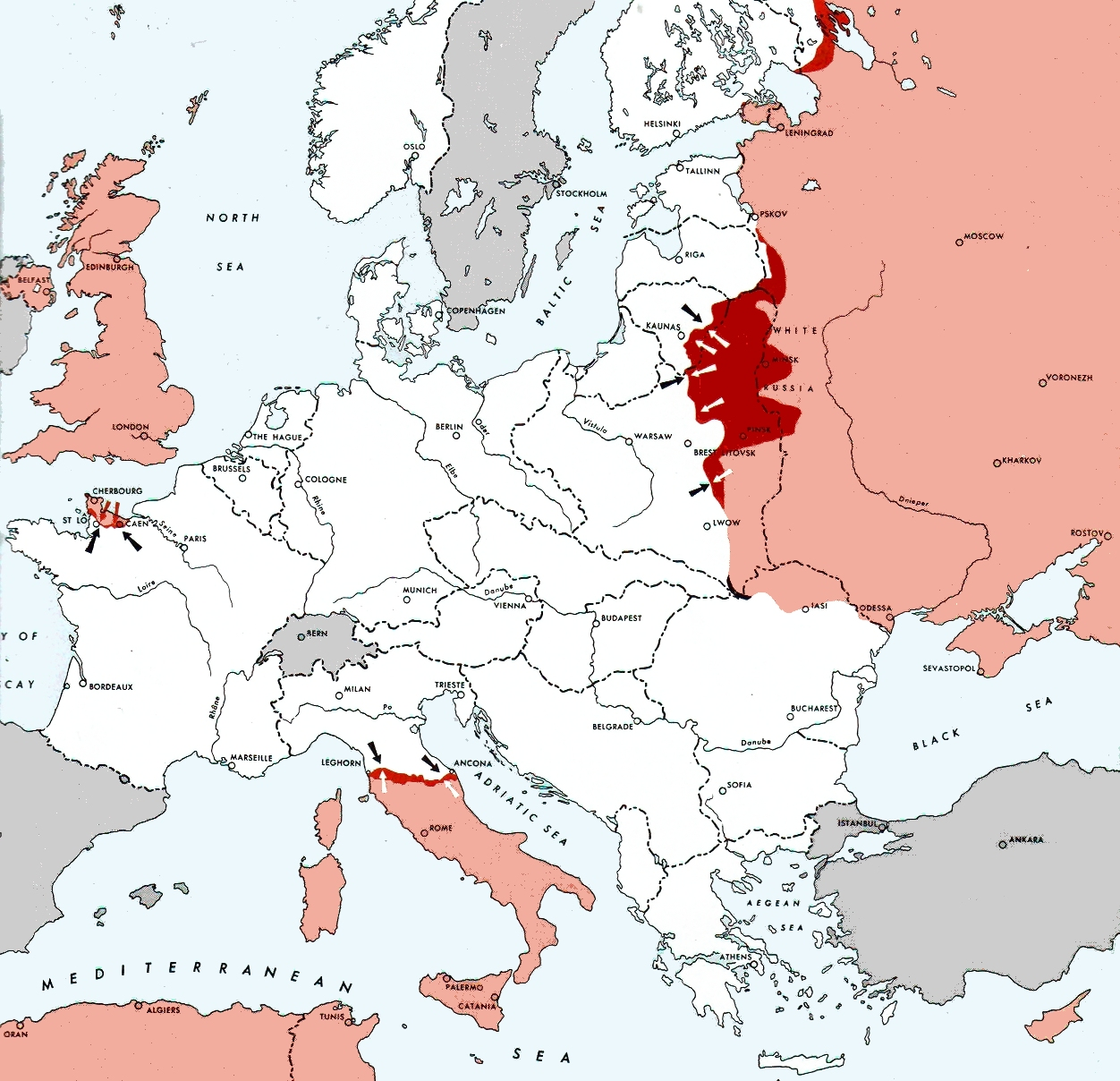
Battle fronts in Europe as of 15 July 1944

Since 1938 there had been groups plotting an overthrow of some kind within the German Army and in the German Military Intelligence Organization. Early leaders of these plots included Major General Hans Oster, the deputy head of the Military Intelligence Office; Colonel General Ludwig Beck, a former Chief of Staff of the German Army High Command (OKH); and Field Marshal Erwin von Witzleben, a former commander of the German 1st Army and the former Commander-in-Chief of the German Army Command in the West. They soon established contacts with several prominent civilians, including Carl Goerdeler, the former mayor of Leipzig, and Helmuth James von Moltke, the great-grandnephew of Moltke the Elder, hero of the Franco-Prussian War.

Groups of military plotters exchanged ideas with civilian, political, and intellectual resistance groups in the Kreisauer Kreis (which met at the von Moltke estate in Kreisau) and in other secret circles. Moltke was against killing Hitler; instead, he wanted him placed on trial. Moltke said, "we are all amateurs and would only bungle it". Moltke also believed killing Hitler would be hypocritical: Hitler and National Socialism had turned wrongdoing into a system, something which the resistance should avoid.

Plans to stage an overthrow and prevent Hitler from launching a new world war were developed in 1938 and 1939, but were aborted because of the indecision of Army General Franz Halder and Field Marshal Walther von Brauchitsch, and the failure of the Western powers to oppose Hitler's aggression until 1939.

In 1942 a new conspiratorial group formed, led by Colonel Henning von Tresckow, a member of Field Marshal Fedor von Bock's staff, who commanded Army Group Centre in Operation Barbarossa. Tresckow systematically recruited oppositionists into the Group's staff, making it the nerve centre of the army resistance. Little could be done against Hitler as he was heavily guarded, and none of the plotters could get near enough to him.

During 1942, Oster and Tresckow nevertheless succeeded in rebuilding an effective resistance network. Their most important recruit was General Friedrich Olbricht, head of the General Army Office headquarters at the Bendlerblock in central Berlin, who controlled an independent system of communications to reserve units throughout Germany. Linking this asset to Tresckow's resistance group in Army Group Centre created a viable coup apparatus.

In late 1942 Tresckow and Olbricht formulated a plan to assassinate Hitler and stage an overthrow during Hitler's visit to the headquarters of Army Group Centre at Smolensk in March 1943, by placing a bomb on his plane (Operation Spark). The bomb failed to detonate, and a second attempt a week later with Hitler at an exhibition of captured Soviet weaponry in Berlin also failed. These failures demoralised the conspirators. During 1943 Tresckow tried without success to recruit senior army field commanders such as Field Marshal Erich von Manstein and Field Marshal Gerd von Rundstedt, to support a seizure of power. Tresckow, in particular, worked on his Commander-in-Chief of Army Group Centre, Field Marshal Günther von Kluge, to persuade him to move against Hitler and at times succeeded in gaining his consent, only to find him indecisive at the last minute. However, despite their refusals, none of the Field Marshals reported their treasonous activities to the Gestapo or Hitler.

=== Motivation and goals ===
==== Opposition to Hitler and to Nazi policies ====
While the primary goal of the plotters was to remove Hitler from power, they did so for various reasons. The majority of the group behind the 20 July plot were conservative nationalists—idealists, but not necessarily of a democratic stripe. Martin Borschat portrays their motivations as a matter of aristocratic resentment, writing that the plot was mainly carried out by conservative elites who were initially integrated by the Nazi government but during the war lost their influence and were concerned about regaining it. However, at least in Stauffenberg's case, the conviction that Nazi Germany's atrocities against civilians and prisoners of war were a dishonour to the nation and its military was likely a major motivating factor. Historian Judith Michel assesses the circle around the 20 July Group as a diverse and heterogeneous group that included liberal democrats, conservatives, social democrats, authoritarian aristocrats, and even communists. The common goal was to overthrow Hitler's regime and bring the war to a swift end. There is evidence of the plot encompassing a broad spectrum of plotters which included communists. That April, before the attempted coup, Stauffenberg agreed to cooperate with the Operational Leadership of the KPD (Communist Party of Germany) remaining in Germany. Contacts were established through the Social Democrats Adolf Reichwein and Julius Leber.

==== Territorial demands ====
Among demands initially countenanced by the plotters for issue towards the Allies were such points as re-establishment of Germany's 1914 boundaries with Belgium, France and Poland and no reparations. Like most of the rest of German resistance, the 20 July plotters believed in the idea of Greater Germany and as a condition for peace demanded that the western allies recognise as a minimum the incorporation of Austria, Alsace-Lorraine, Sudetenland, and the annexation of Polish-inhabited territories that Germany ceded to Poland after 1918, with the restoration of some of the overseas colonies. They believed that Europe should be controlled under German hegemony.

The overall goals towards Poland were mixed within the plotters. Most of the plotters found it desirable to restore the old German borders of 1914, while others pointed out that the demands were unrealistic, and amendments had to be made. Some like Friedrich-Werner Graf von der Schulenburg even wanted all of Poland annexed to Germany.

To Poland, which was fighting against Nazi Germany with both its army and government in exile, the territorial demands and traditional nationalistic visions of resistance were not much different from the racist policies of Hitler. Stauffenberg, one of the leaders of the plot, stated in 1939 during the Poland campaign, five years before the coup attempt: "It is essential that we begin a systemic colonisation in Poland. But I have no fear that this will not occur."

==== Political vision of post-Hitler Germany ====
Many members of the plot had helped the Nazis to gain power and shared revisionist foreign policy goals pursued by Hitler, and even at the time of the plot were anti-democratic, hoping to replace Hitler with a conservative-authoritarian government involving aristocratic rule. They opposed popular legitimation or mass participation in governance of the state.

==== Political program ====
The political program of the planned government was outlined in a draft for a government policy statement, consisting of twelve points:

1. Restoration of the rule of law, independence of the courts, protection of personal and property security, dissolution of concentration camps, prevention of lynch law,
2. Combating corruption, restitution of looted works of art, ending the persecution of Jews, punishment of war crimes,
3. Dissolution of the Reich Ministry of Public Enlightenment and Propaganda and an end to propaganda reporting on the course of the war,
4. Separation of church and state, a Christian mindset as the basis for policies, freedom of the press,
5. Restoration of Christian education by parents
6. Reduction of bureaucracy, examination and possible punishment, dismissal or transfer of all officials appointed and promoted from 1 January 1933, especially Nazi party members
7. Transformation of the provinces of Prussia and states into Reichsgaue, local self-government for the Reichsgaue, districts and municipalities under the supervision of Reichsstatthalter,
8. Restoration of full economic freedom after the war, protection of private property, planned economic measures only under conditions of war-related shortages,
9. Responsible and conscientious social policy in the hands of Reichsgaue and trade unions
10. Ending national debt through tax increases and austerity policies, international agreement on debt repayment
11. Continuation of the war for defence purposes only,
12. Commencement of peace negotiations with the Western Allies, punishment of those Germans responsible for the Second World War.

== Planning a coup ==
=== Von Stauffenberg joins ===
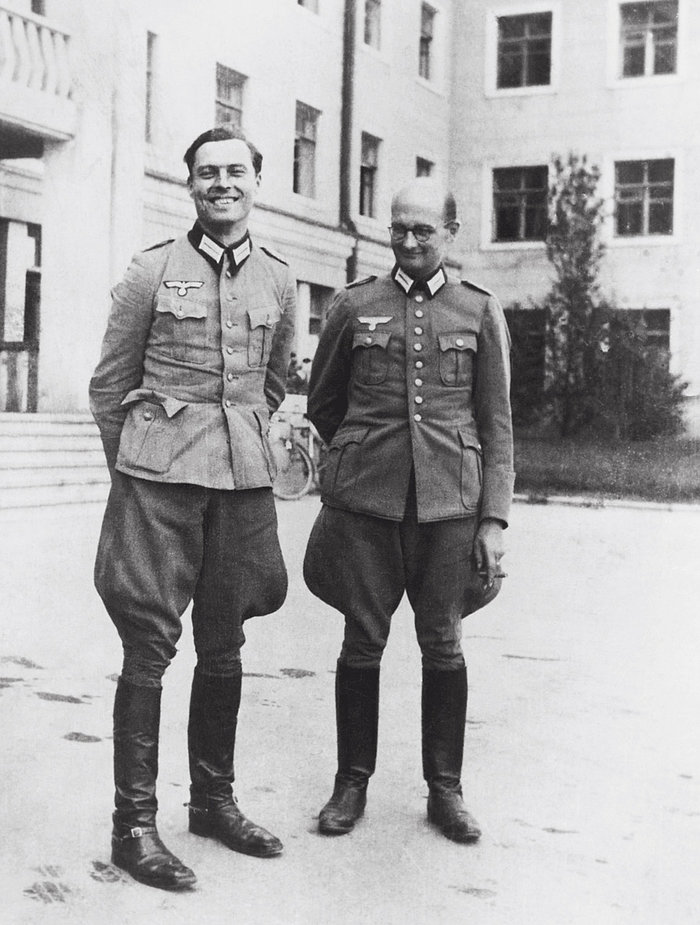
Stauffenberg with Albrecht Mertz von Quirnheim in June 1944

By mid-1943 the tide of war was turning decisively against Germany. The army plotters and their civilian allies became convinced that Hitler should be assassinated, so that a government acceptable to the western Allies could be formed, and a separate peace negotiated in time to prevent a Soviet invasion of Germany. In August 1943 Tresckow met, for the first time, a young staff officer named Lieutenant Colonel Claus von Stauffenberg. Severely wounded in April 1943 by an Allied strafing attack near Mezzouna in North Africa, Stauffenberg was a political conservative and zealous German nationalist.

From early 1942, he had come to share two basic convictions with many military officers: that Germany was being led to disaster and that Hitler's removal from power was necessary. After the Battle of Stalingrad in December 1942, despite his religious scruples, he concluded that the Führer's assassination was a lesser moral evil than Hitler's remaining in power. Stauffenberg brought a new tone of decisiveness to the ranks of the resistance movement. When Tresckow was assigned to the Eastern Front, Stauffenberg took charge of planning and executing the assassination attempt.

=== New plan ===
Olbricht now put forward a new strategy for staging a coup against Hitler. The Replacement Army (Ersatzheer) had an operational plan called Operation Valkyrie, which was to be used in the event that the disruption caused by the Allied bombing of German cities would cause a breakdown in law and order, or an uprising by the millions of forced labourers from occupied countries now being used in German factories. Olbricht suggested that this plan could be used to mobilise the Reserve Army for the purpose of the coup.

In August and September 1943, Tresckow drafted the "revised" Valkyrie plan and new supplementary orders. A secret declaration began with these words: "The Führer Adolf Hitler is dead! A treacherous group of party leaders has attempted to exploit the situation by attacking our embattled soldiers from the rear in order to seize power for themselves." Detailed instructions were written for occupation of government ministries in Berlin, Heinrich Himmler's headquarters in East Prussia, radio stations and telephone offices, and other Nazi apparatus through military districts, and concentration camps.

Previously, it was believed that Stauffenberg was mainly responsible for the Valkyrie plan, but documents recovered by the Soviet Union after the war and released in 2007 suggest that the plan was developed by Tresckow by late 1943. All written information was handled by Tresckow's wife, Erika, and by Margarethe von Oven, his secretary. Both women wore gloves to avoid leaving fingerprints. On at least two other occasions Tresckow had tried to assassinate the Führer. The first plan was to shoot him during dinner at the army base camp, but this plan was aborted because it was widely believed that Hitler wore a bullet-proof vest. The conspirators also considered poisoning him, but this was not possible because his food was specially prepared and tasted. They concluded that a time bomb was the only option.

Operation Valkyrie could only be put into effect by Hitler himself, or by General Friedrich Fromm, commander of the Reserve Army, so the latter had to be either won over to the conspiracy or in some way neutralised if the plan was to succeed.

=== Previous failed attempts ===
During 1943 and early 1944 von Tresckow and von Stauffenberg organised at least five attempts to get one of the military conspirators near enough to Hitler, for long enough to kill him with hand grenades, bombs, or a revolver:

- 13 March 1943 by von Tresckow
- 21 March 1943 by Rudolf Christoph Freiherr von Gersdorff
- late November 1943 by Axel Freiherr von dem Bussche-Streithorst
- February 1944 by Ewald-Heinrich von Kleist-Schmenzin
- 11 March 1944 by Eberhard Freiherr von Breitenbuch

As the war situation deteriorated, Hitler no longer appeared in public and rarely visited Berlin. He spent most of his time at his headquarters at the Wolfsschanze near Rastenburg in East Prussia, with occasional breaks at his Bavarian mountain retreat Obersalzberg near Berchtesgaden. In both places, he was heavily guarded and rarely saw people he did not know or trust. Himmler and the Gestapo were increasingly suspicious of plots against Hitler and rightly suspected the officers of the General Staff, which was indeed the source of many conspiracies against him.

=== Preparations ===
By mid-1944 the Gestapo was closing in on the conspirators. When Stauffenberg sent Tresckow a message through Lieutenant Heinrich Graf von Lehndorff-Steinort asking whether there was any reason for trying to assassinate Hitler given that no political purpose would be served, Tresckow's response was: "The assassination must be attempted, coûte que coûte [whatever the cost]. Even if it fails, we must take action in Berlin , for the practical purpose no longer matters; what matters now is that the German resistance movement must take the plunge before the eyes of the world and of history. Compared to that, nothing else matters."

Himmler had at least one conversation with a known oppositionist when, in August 1943, the Prussian Finance Minister Johannes Popitz, who was involved in Goerdeler's network, came to see him and offered him the support of the opposition if he would make a move to displace Hitler and secure a negotiated end to the war. Nothing came of this meeting, but Popitz was not arrested and Himmler apparently did nothing to track down the resistance network which he knew was operating within the state bureaucracy. It is possible that Himmler, who by late 1943 knew that the war was unwinnable, allowed the plot to go ahead in the knowledge that if it succeeded he would be Hitler's successor, and could then bring about a peace settlement.

Popitz was not alone in seeing Himmler as a potential ally. General von Bock advised Tresckow to seek his support, but there is no evidence that he did so. Goerdeler was apparently also in indirect contact with Himmler via a mutual acquaintance, Carl Langbehn. Wilhelm Canaris's biographer Heinz Höhne suggests that Canaris and Himmler were working together to bring about a change of regime, but this remains speculation.

Stauffenberg's co-conspirators in the plot

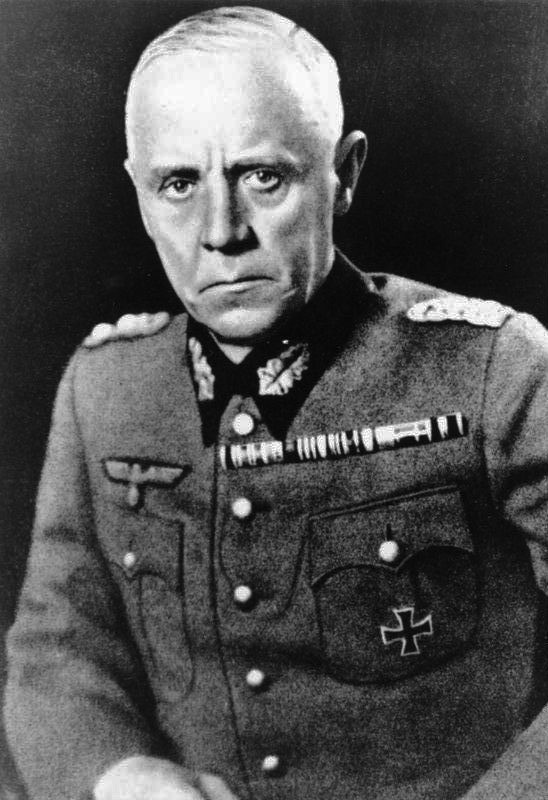
Generaloberst Ludwig Beck

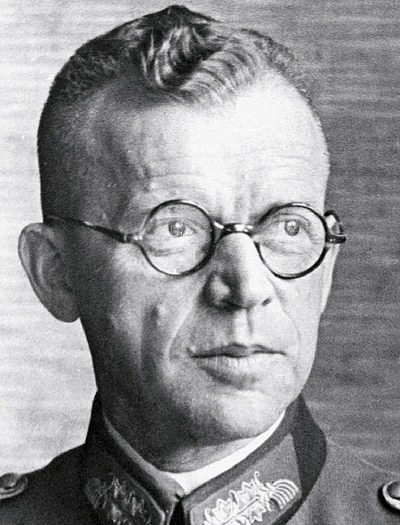
General der Nachrichtentruppe Erich Fellgiebel

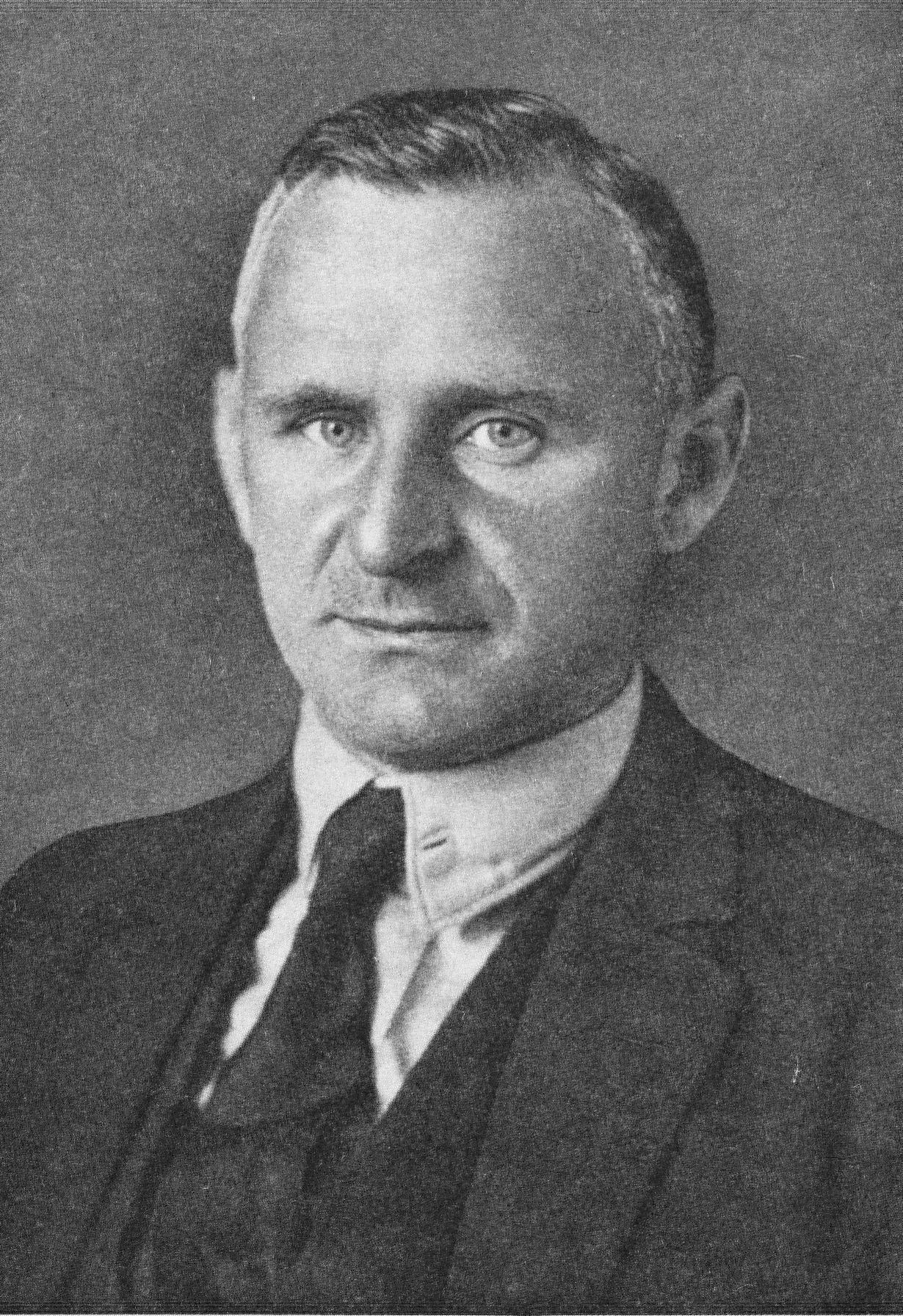
Carl Friedrich Goerdeler

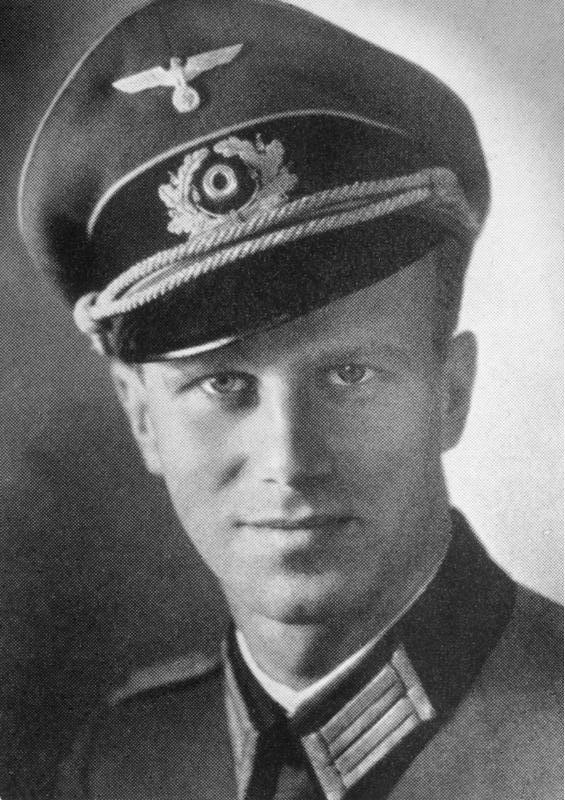
Oberleutnant Werner von Haeften

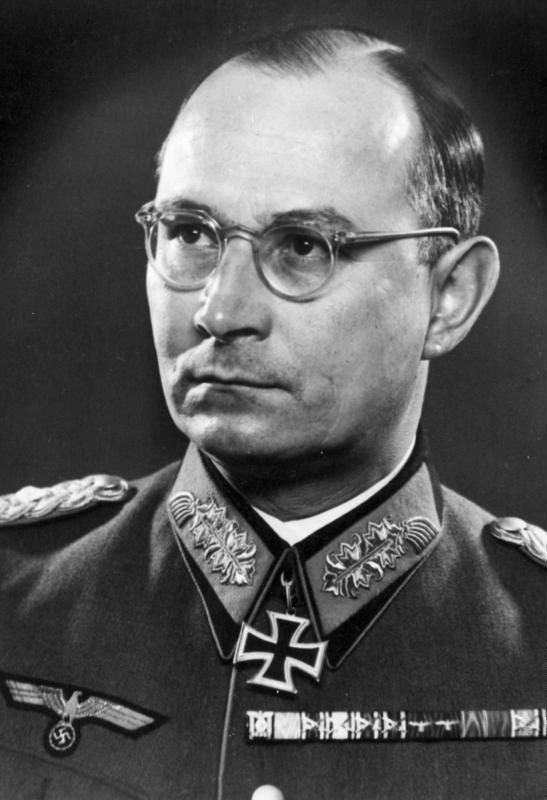
General der Infanterie Friedrich Olbricht

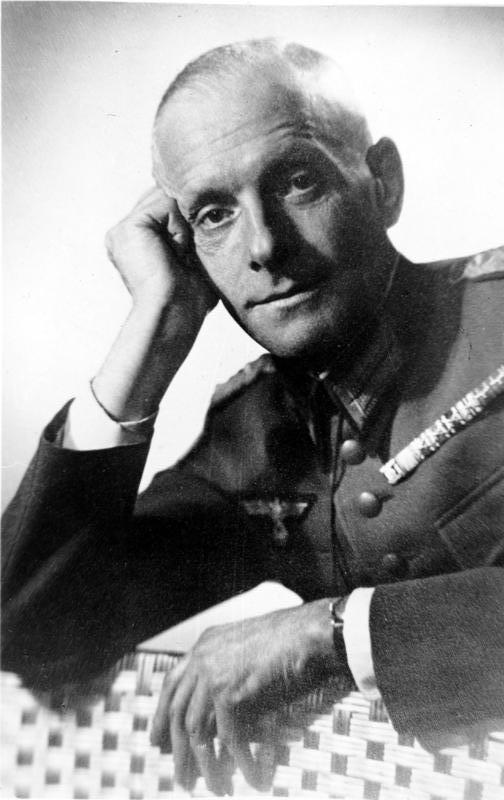
Generalmajor Hans Oster

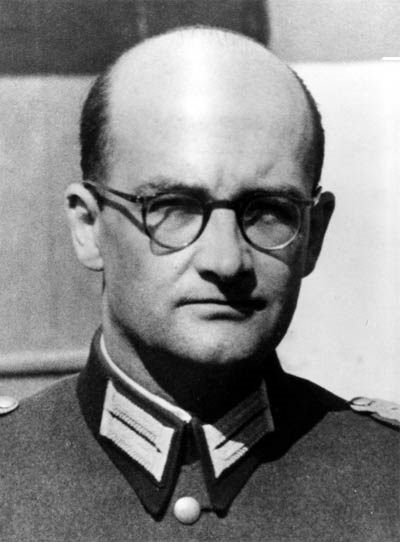
Oberst Albrecht Mertz von Quirnheim

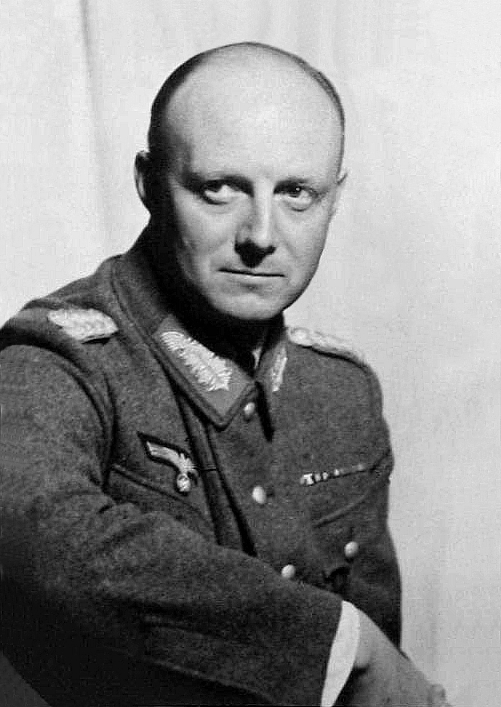
Generalmajor Henning von Tresckow

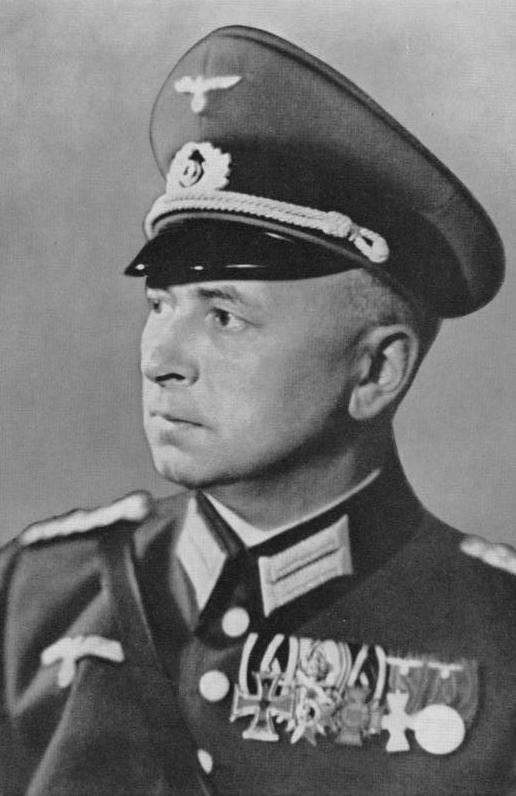
General der Artillerie Eduard Wagner

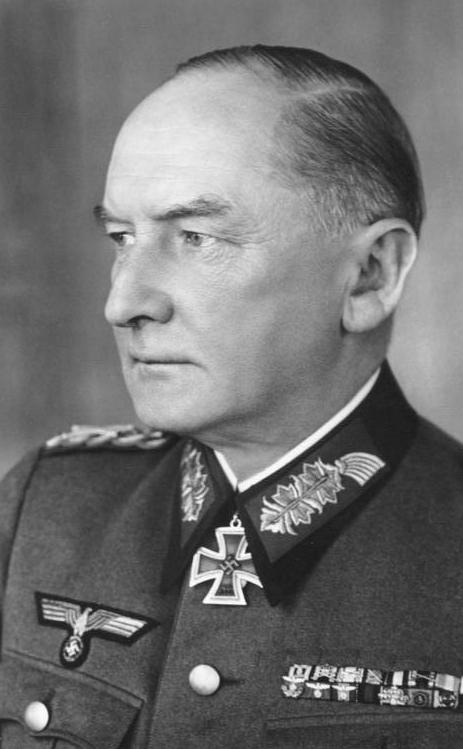
Generalfeldmarschall Erwin von Witzleben

== Countdown to Stauffenberg's attempt ==
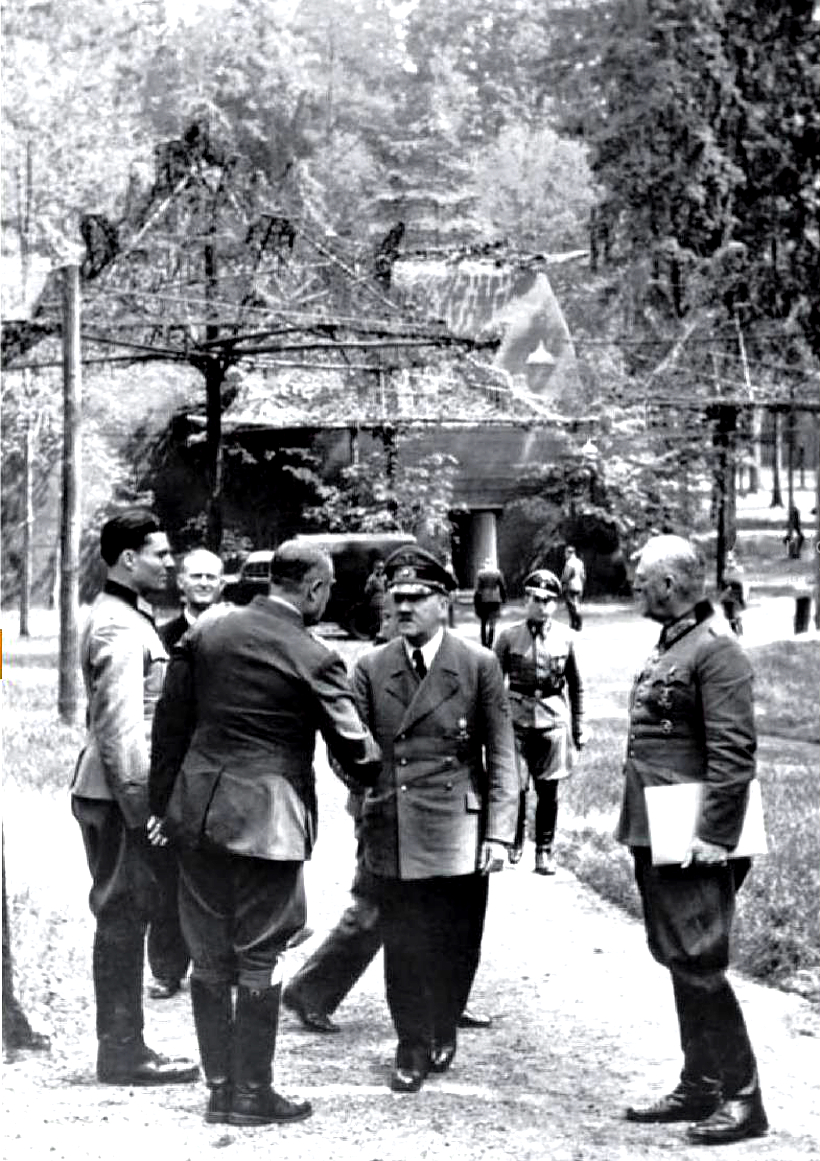
Hitler shaking hands with General Karl Bodenschatz, accompanied by Stauffenberg (left) and Keitel (right). Bodenschatz was seriously wounded five days later by Stauffenberg's bomb. Rastenburg, 15 July 1944.

=== First week of July ===
On Saturday 1 July 1944 Stauffenberg was appointed Chief of Staff to General Friedrich Fromm at the Reserve Army headquarters on Bendlerstraße in central Berlin. This position enabled Stauffenberg to attend Hitler's military conferences, either at the Wolfsschanze in East Prussia or at Berchtesgaden, and would thus give him an opportunity, perhaps the last that would present itself, to kill Hitler with a bomb or a pistol. Meanwhile, new key allies had been gained. These included General Carl-Heinrich von Stülpnagel, the German military commander in France, who would take control in Paris when Hitler was killed, and it was hoped, negotiate an immediate armistice with the invading Allied armies.

=== Aborted attempts ===
The plot was now fully prepared. On 7 July 1944 General Helmuth Stieff was to kill Hitler at a display of new uniforms at Klessheim castle near Salzburg. However, Stieff felt unable to kill Hitler. Stauffenberg now decided to do both, assassinate Hitler and to manage the plot in Berlin.

On 14 July Stauffenberg attended Hitler's conferences carrying a bomb in his briefcase, but because the conspirators had decided that Himmler and Hermann Göring should be killed simultaneously if the planned mobilisation of Operation Valkyrie was to have a chance to succeed, he held back at the last minute because Himmler was not present. In fact, it was unusual for Himmler to attend military conferences.

By 15 July, when Stauffenberg again flew to the Wolfsschanze, this condition had been dropped. The plan was for Stauffenberg to plant the briefcase with the bomb in Hitler's conference room with a timer running, excuse himself from the meeting, wait for the explosion, then fly back to Berlin and join the other plotters at the Bendlerblock. Operation Valkyrie would be mobilised, the Reserve Army would take control of Germany and the other Nazi leaders would be arrested. Beck would be appointed provisional head of state, Goerdeler would be chancellor, and Witzleben would be commander-in-chief of the armed forces.

Again on 15 July, the attempt was called off at the last minute. Himmler and Göring were present, but Hitler was called out of the room at the last moment. Stauffenberg was able to intercept the bomb and prevent its discovery.

== 20 July 1944 ==
=== Operation Valkyrie ===
Approximate positions of the attendees at the meeting in relation to the briefcase bomb when it exploded: 1. Adolf Hitler; 2. Adolf Heusinger; 3. Günther Korten; 4. Heinz Brandt; 5. Karl Bodenschatz; 6. Heinz Waizenegger; 7. Rudolf Schmundt; 8. Heinrich Borgmann; 9. Walther Buhle; 10. Karl-Jesko von Puttkamer; 11. Heinrich Berger; 12. Heinz Assmann; 13. Ernst John von Freyend; 14. Walter Scherff; 15. Hans-Erich Voss; 16. Otto Günsche; 17. Nicolaus von Below; 18. Hermann Fegelein; 19. Heinz Buchholz; 20. Herbert Büchs; 21. Franz von Sonnleithner; 22. Walter Warlimont; 23. Alfred Jodl; 24. Wilhelm Keitel

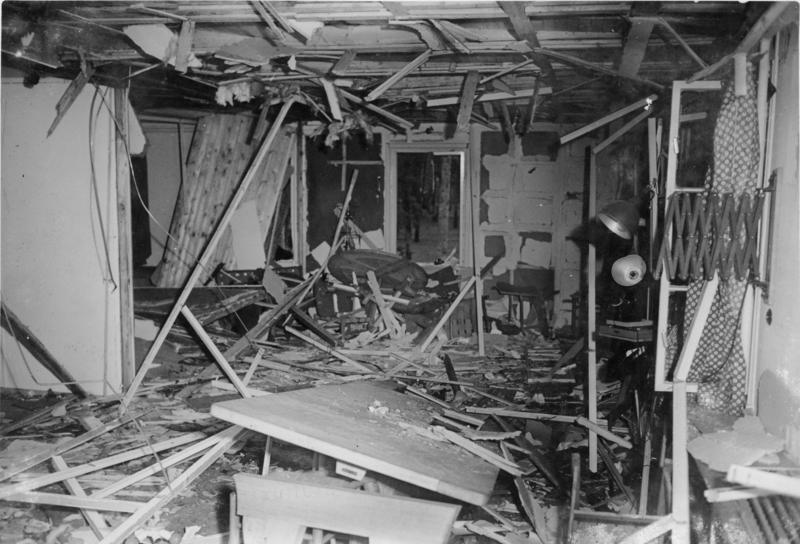
Bomb damage to the conference room

On 18 July rumours reached Stauffenberg that the Gestapo had knowledge of the conspiracy and that he might be arrested at any time—this was apparently not true, but there was a sense that the net was closing in and that the next opportunity to kill Hitler must be taken because there might not be another. On the morning of Thursday 20 July Stauffenberg flew back to the Wolfsschanze for another military conference at which Hitler would be present, once again with a bomb in his briefcase.

At around 12:30 pm as the conference began, Stauffenberg asked to use a washroom in Wilhelm Keitel's office, saying that he had to change his shirt, which indeed was soaked through with sweat, it being a very hot day. There, assisted by von Haeften, he used pliers to crush the end of a pencil detonator inserted into a 1 kilogram (2.2 lb) block of plastic explosive wrapped in brown paper, that was prepared by Wessel von Freytag-Loringhoven. The pencil detonator consisted of a thin copper tube containing cupric chloride that would take about ten minutes to silently eat through wire holding back the firing pin from the percussion cap. It was slow going due to war wounds that had cost Stauffenberg an eye, his right hand, and two fingers on his left hand. Interrupted by a guard knocking on the door advising him that the meeting was about to begin, he was not able to prime the second bomb, which he gave to his aide-de-camp, Werner von Haeften.

Stauffenberg placed the single primed bomb inside his briefcase and, with the unwitting assistance of Major Ernst John von Freyend, entered the conference room containing Hitler and 20 officers, positioning the briefcase under the table near Hitler. After a few minutes, Stauffenberg received a planned telephone call and left the room. It is presumed that Colonel Heinz Brandt, who was standing next to Hitler, used his foot to move the briefcase aside by pushing it behind the leg of the conference table, thus unintentionally deflecting the blast from Hitler but causing the loss of one of his legs and his own demise when the bomb detonated.

At 12:42 the bomb detonated, demolishing the conference room and killing a stenographer instantly. More than 20 people in the room were injured with three officers later dying. Hitler survived, as did everyone else who was shielded from the blast by the conference table leg. His trousers were singed and tattered, and he suffered from a perforated eardrum (as did most of the other 24 people in the room), as well as from conjunctivitis in his right eye. Hitler's personal physician, Theodor Morell, administered penicillin which had been taken from captured Allied soldiers for treatment; Morell had previously observed the death of Reinhard Heydrich from sepsis in an assassination two years earlier.

=== Escape from the Wolf's Lair and flight to Berlin ===
Stauffenberg was seen leaving the conference building by Kurt Salterberg, a soldier on guard duty who did not consider this out of the ordinary as attendees sometimes left to collect documents. He then saw a "massive" cloud of smoke, wood splinters and paper and men being hurled through a window and door. Stauffenberg, upon witnessing the explosion and smoke, assumed that Hitler was dead. He then climbed into a staff car with his aide Werner von Haeften and managed to bluff his way past three checkpoints to exit the Wolfsschanze complex. Haeften then tossed the second (unprimed) bomb into the forest as they made a dash for Rastenburg airfield, reaching it before it could be realised that Stauffenberg could be responsible for the explosion. At first it was thought that the explosion had been the result of an aerial bombing, but when it was confirmed that no warplanes had flown over and Stauffenberg was absent, the theory of an assassination attempt gained strength. By 13:00 he was airborne in a Heinkel He 111 arranged by General Eduard Wagner.

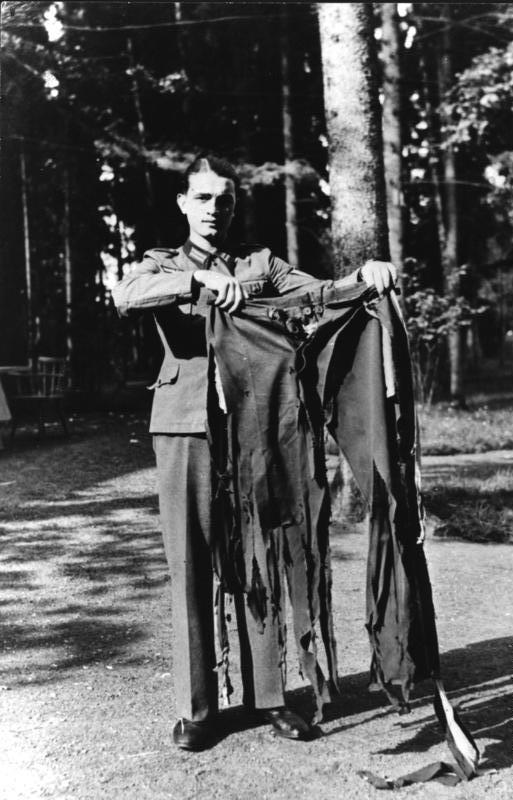
Hitler's tattered trousers

By the time Stauffenberg's aircraft reached Berlin about 16:00, General Erich Fellgiebel, an officer at the Wolfsschanze who was in on the plot, had phoned the Bendlerblock and told the plotters that Hitler had survived the explosion. As a result, the plot to mobilise Operation Valkyrie would have no chance of succeeding once the officers of the Reserve Army knew that Hitler was alive. There was more confusion when Stauffenberg's aircraft landed and he phoned from the airport to say that Hitler was in fact dead. The Bendlerblock plotters did not know whom to believe.

Finally, at 16:00 Olbricht issued the orders for Operation Valkyrie to be mobilised. The vacillating General Fromm, however, phoned Field Marshal Wilhelm Keitel at the Wolf's Lair and was assured that Hitler was alive. Keitel demanded to know Stauffenberg's whereabouts. This told Fromm that the plot had been traced to his headquarters and that he was in mortal danger. Fromm replied that he thought Stauffenberg was with Hitler.

Meanwhile, General Carl-Heinrich von Stülpnagel, military governor of occupied France, managed to disarm the SD and SS and captured most of their leadership. He travelled to Field Marshal Günther von Kluge's headquarters and asked him to contact the Allies, only to be informed that Hitler was alive. At 16:40 Stauffenberg and Haeften arrived at the Bendlerblock. Fromm, presumably to protect himself, changed sides and attempted to have Stauffenberg arrested. Olbricht and Stauffenberg restrained him at gunpoint and Olbricht then appointed General Erich Hoepner to take over his duties.

By this time Himmler had taken charge of the situation and had issued orders countermanding Olbricht's mobilisation of Operation Valkyrie. In many places the coup was going ahead, led by officers who believed that Hitler was dead. City Commandant, and conspirator, Lieutenant General Paul von Hase ordered the Wachbataillon Großdeutschland, under the command of Major Otto Ernst Remer, to secure the Wilhelmstraße and arrest Propaganda Minister Joseph Goebbels. In Vienna, Prague, and many other places troops occupied Nazi Party offices and arrested Gauleiters and SS officers.

=== Failure of the coup ===
At around 18:10, the commander of Military District III (Berlin), General Joachim von Kortzfleisch, was summoned to the Bendlerblock; he angrily refused Olbricht's orders, kept shouting "the Führer is alive", was arrested, and held under guard. General Karl Freiherr von Thüngen was appointed in his place but proved to be of almost no help. General Fritz Lindemann, who was supposed to make a proclamation to the German people over the radio, failed to appear and as he held the only copy, Beck had to work on a new one.

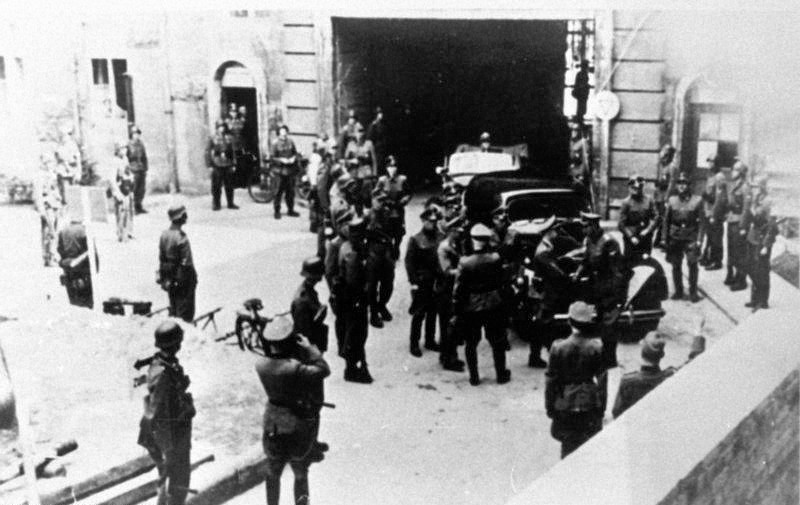
Soldiers and Waffen SS men at the Bendlerblock, July 1944

At 19:00 Hitler was sufficiently recovered to make phone calls. He called Goebbels at the Propaganda Ministry. Goebbels arranged for Hitler to speak to Major Otto Ernst Remer, commander of the troops surrounding the Ministry. After assuring him that he was still alive, Hitler ordered Remer to regain control of the situation in Berlin and capture the conspirators alive. Major Remer ordered his troops to surround and seal off the Bendlerblock, but not to enter the buildings. At 20:00 a furious Witzleben arrived at the Bendlerblock and had a bitter argument with Stauffenberg, who was still insisting that the coup could go ahead. Witzleben left shortly afterwards. At around this time the planned seizure of power in Paris was aborted when Field Marshal Günther von Kluge, who had recently been appointed commander-in-chief in the West, learnt that Hitler was alive.

As Remer regained control of the city and word spread that Hitler was still alive, the less resolute members of the conspiracy in Berlin began to change sides. Fromm was freed from his room and fighting broke out in the Bendlerblock between officers supporting and opposing the coup; Stauffenberg was wounded after a shootout. As the fighting was still ongoing, Remer and his forces arrived at the Bendlerblock and the conspirators were overwhelmed and arrested; by 23:00 Fromm and Remer had regained control of the building.

Perhaps hoping that a show of zealous loyalty would save him, Fromm convened an impromptu court martial consisting of himself, and sentenced Olbricht, Stauffenberg, Haeften and another officer, Colonel Albrecht Mertz von Quirnheim, to death, while putting Beck under arrest; Beck, realising the situation was hopeless, asked for a pistol and shot himself—the first of many attempted suicides in the coming days. At first Beck only seriously wounded himself—he was then shot in the neck and killed by soldiers. Despite protests from Remer (who had been ordered by Hitler to arrest the conspirators), at 00:10 on 21 July the four officers were executed in the courtyard outside, possibly to prevent them from revealing Fromm's involvement. Others would have been executed as well, but at 00:30 Waffen-SS personnel led by SS-Obersturmbannführer Otto Skorzeny arrived and further executions were forbidden. At around 01:00 Hitler addressed the public in a radio broadcast regarding the assassination attempt: "A very small clique of ambitious, unscrupulous, and, at the same time, irrational—criminally stupid—officers has hatched a plot to eliminate me—and, along with me, virtually the entire leadership staff of the German Armed Forces. ..."

== Aftermath ==
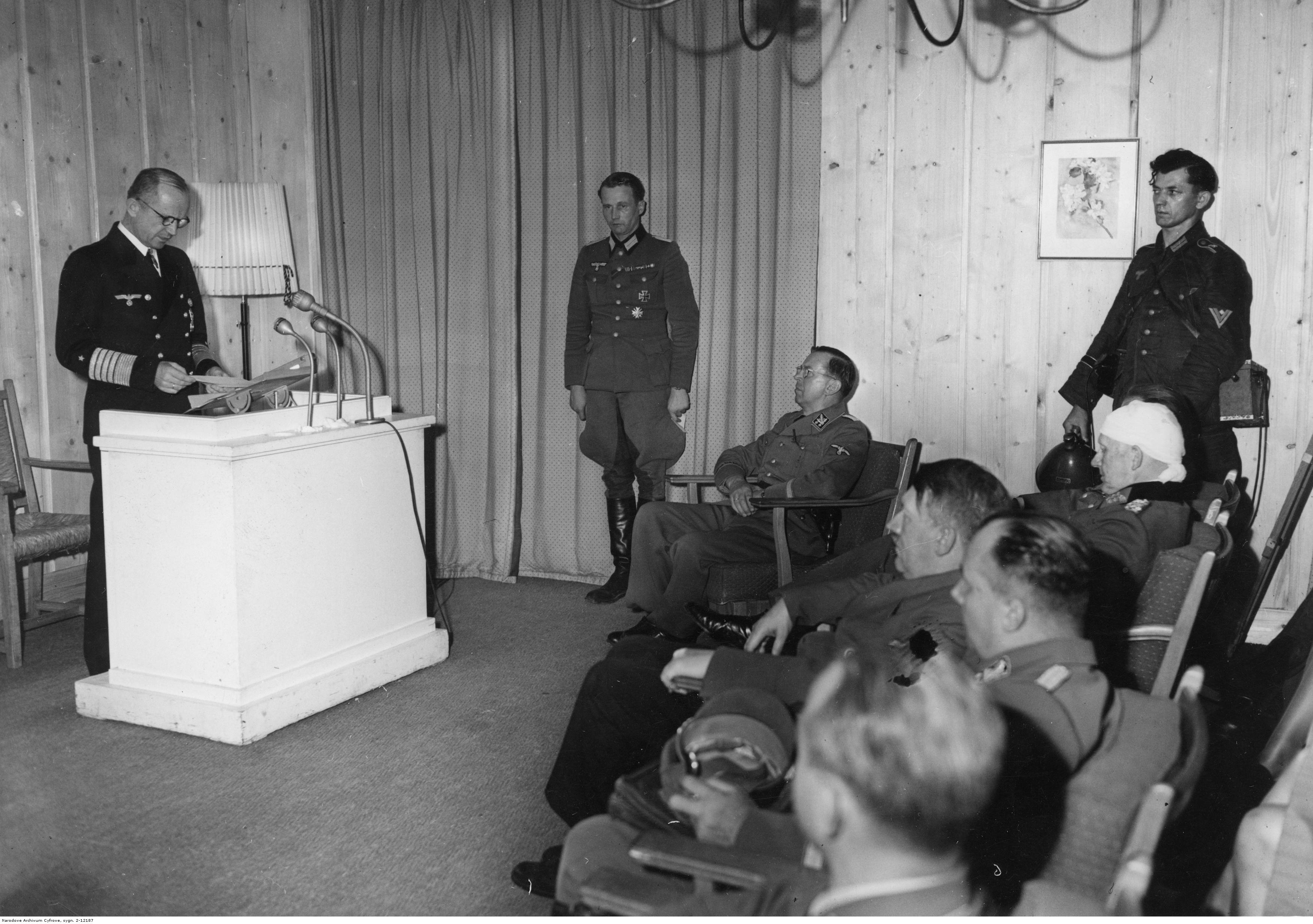
Admiral Karl Donitz giving a radio speech after the attempt on Hitler's life. 21 July 1944

Over the following weeks, Himmler's Gestapo, driven by a furious Hitler, rounded up nearly everyone who had the remotest connection with the plot. The discovery of letters and diaries in the homes and offices of those arrested revealed the plots of 1938, 1939, and 1943, and this led to further rounds of arrests, including that of Colonel General Franz Halder, who finished the war in a concentration camp. Under Himmler's new Sippenhaft (blood guilt) laws, many relatives of the principal plotters were also arrested in the immediate aftermath of the failed plot.

Sippenhaft was proposed and introduced by Himmler and remained in effect until the end of the war. Its distribution was aimed at creating fears among Wehrmacht members for their families in the event of an attempted betrayal. At first, the practice was not regulated and was carried out chaotically, which was due to Himmler’s refusal to “establish specific rules regarding clan guardianship”, however, on 5 February 1945 Keitel’s order was issued, according to which the family of a serviceman who committed high treason was subjected to repression up to and including the death penalty. Presumably, the Sippenhaft regulation was introduced to tighten control over the military and keep them in the army during the final period of the war.

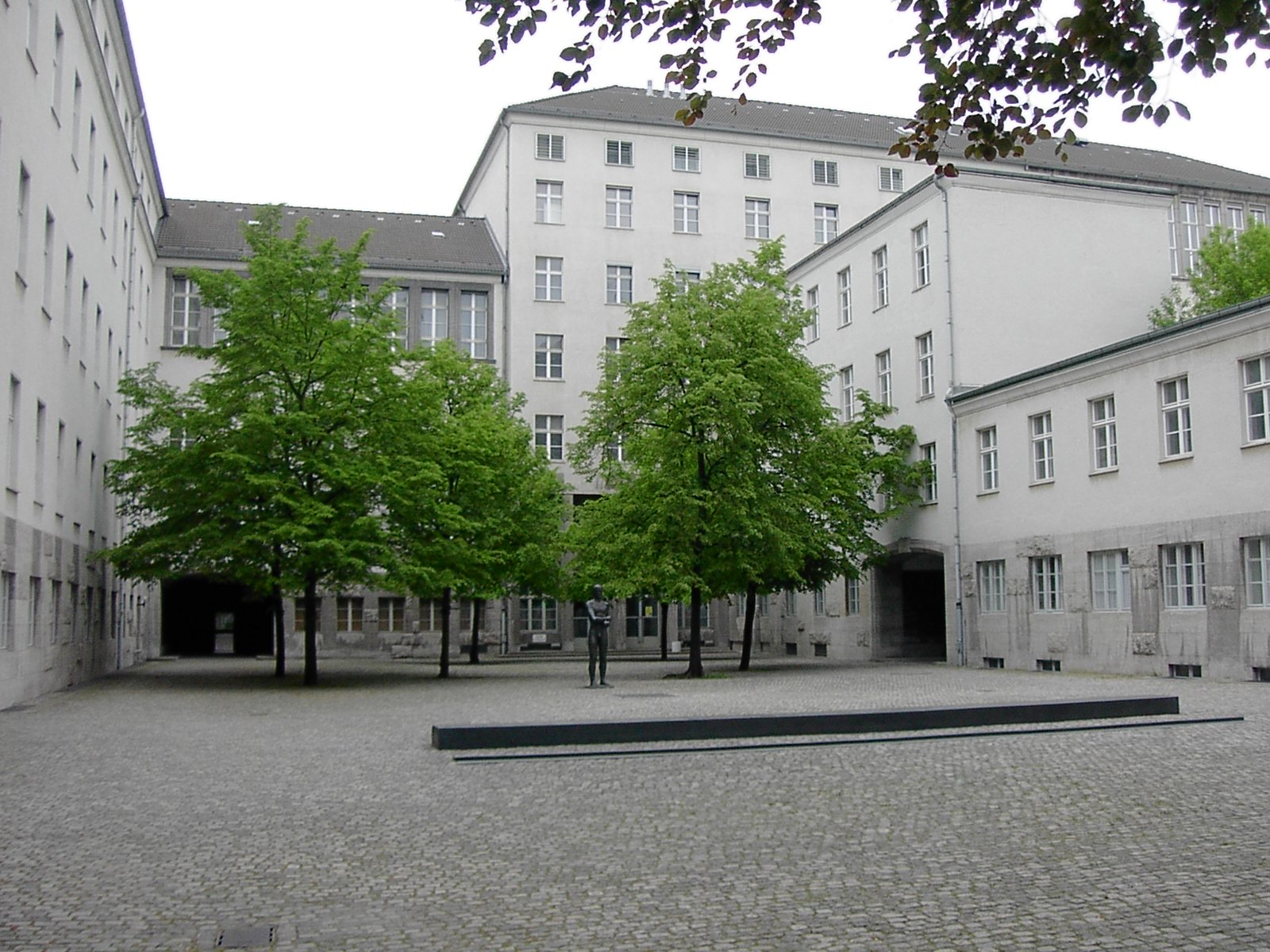
Courtyard at the Bendlerblock, where Stauffenberg, Olbricht, and others were executed

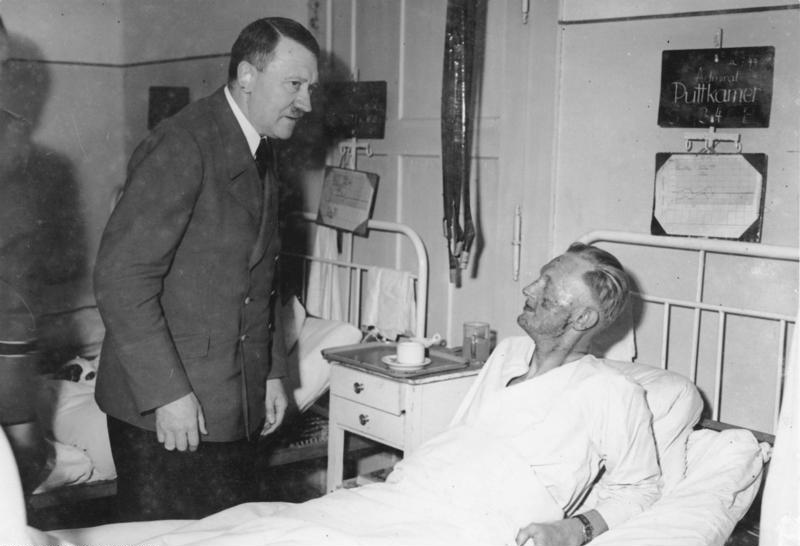
Hitler visits Karl-Jesko von Puttkamer in the Carlshof hospital.

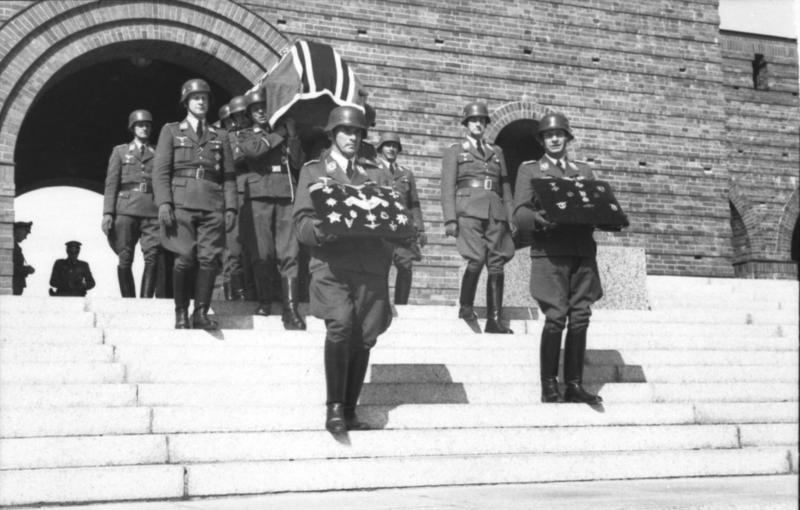
Funeral of General Günther Korten at the Tannenberg Memorial

Particularly noteworthy in considering this issue is the scientific publication of Robert Loeffel. In his study, Loeffel came to the conclusion that Sippenhaft, as part of state terror at the end of the war, was a means of intimidation within Nazi Germany, when in reality this practice was not always applied, and most of the terror was adopted only after 20 July. This was due to its duality: terror was implemented only in quantities necessary to maintain a level of fear among the population that would not lead them to go over to the side of resistance.

More than 7,000 people were arrested and 4,980 were executed. Not all of them were connected with the plot, since the Gestapo used the occasion to settle scores with many other people suspected of opposition sympathies. Alfons Heck, a former Hitler Youth member and later a historian, describes the reaction many Germans felt to the punishments of the conspirators:

When I heard that German officers had tried to kill Adolf Hitler ... I was enraged. I fully concurred with the sentences imposed on them, strangling I felt was too good for them; this was the time, precisely, when we were at a very ... precarious military situation. And the only man who could possibly stave off disaster ... was Adolf Hitler. That opinion was shared by many Germans, Germans who did not adore Hitler, who did not belong to the [Nazi] Party.

Allied radio stations also speculated on who the possible remaining suspects could be, many of whom were eventually implicated in the plot.

Very few of the plotters tried to escape or to deny their guilt when arrested. Those who survived interrogation were given perfunctory trials before the People's Court. The court's president, Roland Freisler, belittled and insulted the accused in the trial, which was filmed for propaganda purposes. The plotters were stripped of their uniforms and given old, shabby clothing to humiliate them for the cameras. The officers involved in the plot were "tried" before the Court of Military Honour, a drumhead court-martial that merely considered the evidence furnished to it by the Gestapo before expelling the accused from the Army in disgrace and handing them over to the People's Court.

The first trials were held on 7 and 8 August 1944 and were held in the plenary chamber of the Berlin high court the Kammergericht in Schöneberg. Hitler had ordered that those found guilty should be "hanged like cattle". Many people took their own lives prior to either their trial or their execution, including Kluge, who was accused of having knowledge of the plot beforehand and not revealing it to Hitler. Stülpnagel tried to commit suicide, but survived and was hanged.

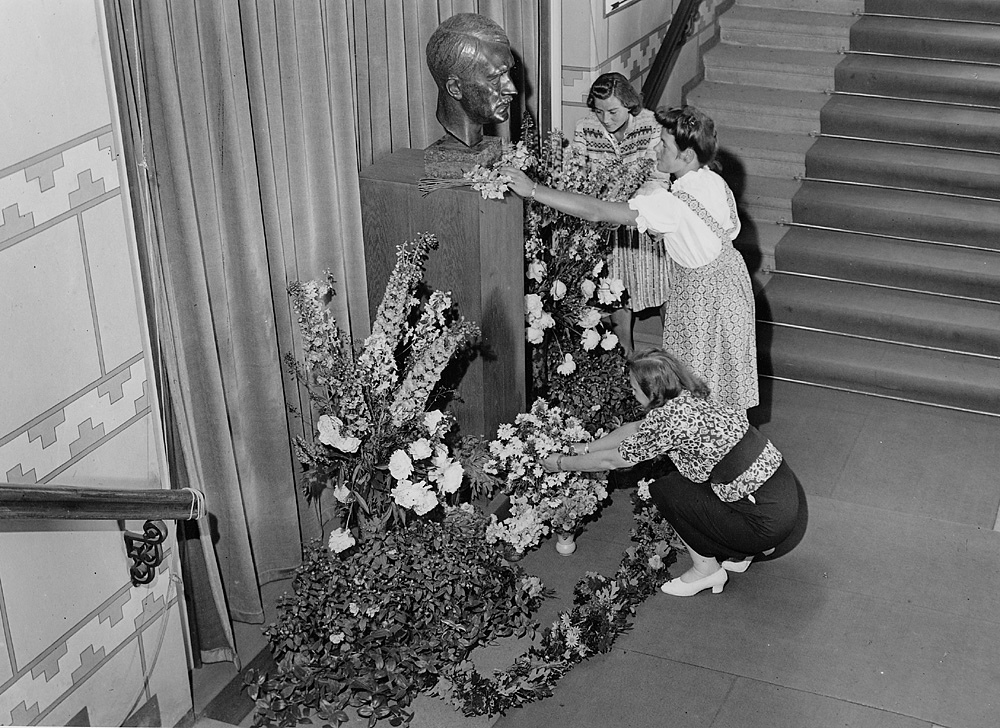
Hitler's bust in the Storting is decorated with flowers following the assassination attempt on 20 July 1944.

Tresckow killed himself the day after the failed plot by use of a hand grenade in no man's land between Soviet and German lines. Adjutant General Fabian von Schlabrendorff recalled Tresckow saying the following before his death:

The whole world will vilify us now, but I am still totally convinced that we did the right thing. Hitler is the archenemy not only of Germany but of the world. When, in few hours' time, I go before God to account for what I have done and left undone, I know I will be able to justify what I did in the struggle against Hitler. None of us can bewail his own death; those who consented to join our circle put on the robe of Nessus. A human being's moral integrity begins when he is prepared to sacrifice his life for his convictions.

Fromm's attempt to win favour by executing Stauffenberg and others on the night of 20 July had merely exposed his own previous lack of action and apparent failure to report the plot. Having been arrested on 21 July, Fromm was later convicted and sentenced to death by the People's Court. Despite his knowledge of the conspiracy, his formal sentence charged him with poor performance in his duties. He was executed in Brandenburg an der Havel. Hitler personally commuted his death sentence from hanging to the "more honourable" firing squad. Erwin Planck, the son of the physicist Max Planck, was executed for his involvement.

A report of SS-Obergruppenführer Ernst Kaltenbrunner to Hitler dated 29 November 1944 on the background of the plot states that the Pope was somehow a conspirator, specifically naming Eugenio Pacelli, Pope Pius XII, as being a party in the attempt. Evidence indicates that the 20 July plotters Colonel Wessel von Freytag-Loringhoven, Colonel Erwin von Lahousen, and Admiral Wilhelm Canaris were involved in the foiling of Hitler's alleged plot to kidnap or murder Pope Pius XII in 1943, when Canaris reported the plot to Italian counterintelligence officer General Cesare Amè, who passed on the information.

A member of the SA convicted of participating in the plot was SA-Obergruppenführer Wolf-Heinrich Graf von Helldorf, who was the Orpo Police Chief of Berlin and had been in contact with members of the resistance since before the war. Collaborating closely with SS-Gruppenführer Arthur Nebe, he was supposed to direct all police forces in Berlin to stand down and not interfere in the military actions to seize the government. However, his actions on 20 July had minimal influence on the events. For his involvement in the conspiracy, he was later arrested, convicted of treason and executed.

After 3 February 1945, when Freisler was killed in an American air raid, there were no more formal trials, but as late as April, with the war weeks away from its end, Canaris' diary was found, and many more people were implicated. Hans Von Dohnanyi was accused of being the "spiritual leader" of the conspiracy to assassinate Hitler, and executed on 6 April 1945. Dietrich Bonhoeffer, whom Von Dohnanyi had recruited into the Abwehr, was executed 9 April 1945 along with Canaris, Oster, and four others. Executions continued and ramped up into the last days of the war, as the Nazis were determined to take down as many of their enemies with them as they possibly could.

Hitler took his survival to be a "divine moment in history", and commissioned a special decoration to be made for each person wounded or killed in the blast. The result was the Wound Badge of 20 July 1944. The badges were struck in three values: gold, silver, and black. (The colours denoted the severity of the wounds received by each recipient.) A total of 100 badges were manufactured, and 47 are believed to have actually been awarded. Each badge was accompanied by an ornate award document personally signed by Hitler. The badges themselves bore a facsimile of his signature, making them among the rarest decorations to have been awarded by Nazi Germany.

For his role in stopping the coup Major Remer was promoted to colonel and ended the war as a Major General. After the war he co-founded the Socialist Reich Party and remained a prominent neo-Nazi and advocate of Holocaust denial until his death in 1997.

Major Philipp von Boeselager, the German officer who provided the plastic explosives used in the bomb, escaped detection and survived the war. He was the second-to-last survivor of those involved in the plot and died on 1 May 2008, aged 90. The last survivor of the 20 July Plot was Oberleutnant Ewald-Heinrich von Kleist-Schmenzin, the thwarted plotter of just a few months before. He died on 8 March 2013, aged 90.

As a result of the failed coup, every member of the Wehrmacht was required to reswear his loyalty oath, by name, to Hitler and on 24 July 1944 the military salute was replaced throughout the armed forces with the Hitler Salute in which the arm was outstretched and the salutation Heil Hitler was given.

== Planned government ==
The conspirators had earlier designated positions in secret to form a government that would take office after the assassination of Hitler were it to prove successful. Because of the plot's failure, such a government never rose to power and most of its members were executed.

The following were intended for these roles as at July 1944:

- Ludwig Beck – Reichsverweser (or Lieutenant-General of the Reich, provisional head of state)
- Carl Friedrich Goerdeler – Chancellor
- Wilhelm Leuschner – Vice-Chancellor
- Paul Löbe – President of the Reichstag
- Julius Leber – Interior Minister
- Eugen Bolz – Minister of Education
- Friedrich Werner von der Schulenburg or Ulrich von Hassell – Foreign Minister
- Ewald Loeser – Minister of Finance
- Erwin von Witzleben – Minister of War and Commander-in-Chief of the Wehrmacht
  - Claus von Stauffenberg and Friedrich Olbricht – State Secretaries
- Hans Oster – President of the Reichskriegsgericht
- Hans Koch – President of the Reichsgericht
- Karl Blessing – President of the Reichsbank
- Paul Lejeune-Jung – Minister of Economics
- Andreas Hermes – Minister of Food and Agriculture
- Josef Wirmer – Minister of Justice
- Bernhard Letterhaus – Minister without portfolio or for Reconstruction
- Henning von Tresckow – Chief of Police
- Carl-Hans von Hardenberg – Oberpräsident of Berlin and Brandenburg

Of the surviving members, only two eventually attained roles in post-war Germany analogous to those they were earmarked for in the planned post-assassination government: Paul Löbe became the first President by right of age of the Bundestag (but not its standing President) and Karl Blessing became the first President of the Bundesbank. Also, Andreas Hermes became chairman of the food committee in the Bizonal Economic Council after the war, but this was a role analogous to a parliamentary committee chairman rather than a government minister.

It was planned to include one Austrian politician (probably Heinrich Gleißner or Karl Seitz) as minister without portfolio to keep Austria in the Reich.

Albert Speer was listed in several notes of the conspirators as a possible Minister of Armaments; however, most of these notes stated Speer should not be approached until after Hitler was dead and one conjectural government chart had a question mark beside Speer's name. This (in addition to Speer being one of Hitler's closest and most trusted friends) most likely saved Speer from arrest by the SS.

Wilhelm, Crown Prince of Germany, was also under suspicion as he was touted to be head of state after Hitler. He was placed under the supervision of the Gestapo and his home in the Cecilienhof at Potsdam watched.

== Erwin Rommel's involvement ==
The extent of Generalfeldmarschall Erwin Rommel's involvement in the military's resistance against Hitler or the 20 July plot is difficult to ascertain, as most of the leaders who were directly involved did not survive and limited documentation on the conspirators' plans and preparations exists. Historians' opinions on this matter vary greatly. According to Peter Hoffmann, he had turned into Hitler's resolute opponent and in the end supported the coup (though not the assassination itself). He was even the natural leader of the opposition in France to some extent, considering the fact he had drawn many military and political personnel into his orbit in preparation of a "Western solution". Ralf Georg Reuth thinks that the conspirators perhaps mistook Rommel's ambiguous attitude for approval of the assassination. In this regard, it should be remembered that the conspirators normally did not explicitly mention the assassination. Rommel for his part was in fact both very naive and very attached to Hitler (who was the personification of National Socialism, which had provided Rommel with a great career). Thus even if Caesar von Hofacker—personal advisor to Stülpnagel— had mentioned a violent upheaval in Berlin, Rommel would perhaps not have interpreted it as an assassination. Thus, Rommel's participation remains ambiguous and the perception of it largely has its source in the subsequent events (especially Rommel's forced suicide) and the accounts by surviving participants.

According to a post-war account by Karl Strölin, the Oberbürgermeister of Stuttgart at that time, he and two other conspirators, Alexander von Falkenhausen and Carl Heinrich von Stülpnagel began efforts to bring Rommel into the anti-Hitler conspiracy in early 1944. On 15 April 1944 Rommel's new chief of staff, Hans Speidel, arrived in Normandy and reintroduced Rommel to Stülpnagel. Speidel had previously been connected to Carl Goerdeler, the civilian leader of the resistance, but not to the plotters led by Stauffenberg, and only came to the attention of Stauffenberg due to his appointment to Rommel's headquarters. The conspirators felt they needed the support of a field marshal on active duty. Witzleben was a field marshal, but had not been on active duty since 1942. The conspirators gave instructions to Speidel to bring Rommel into their circle.

Speidel met with the former foreign minister Konstantin von Neurath and Strölin on 27 May in Germany, ostensibly at Rommel's request, although the latter was not present. Neurath and Strölin suggested opening immediate surrender negotiations in the West, and, according to Speidel, Rommel agreed to further discussions and preparations. Around the same timeframe, however, the plotters in Berlin were not aware that Rommel had reportedly decided to take part in the conspiracy. On 16 May, they informed Allen Dulles, through whom they hoped to negotiate with the Western Allies, that Rommel could not be counted on for support. Three days before the assassination attempt, on 17 July, Rommel's staff car was strafed by an Allied aircraft in France; he was hospitalised with major injuries and incapacitated on 20 July.

Rommel opposed assassinating Hitler. After the war, his widow maintained that he believed an assassination attempt would spark a civil war. According to the journalist and author William L. Shirer, Rommel knew about the conspiracy and advocated that Hitler be arrested and placed on trial. The historian Ian Becket argues that "there is no credible evidence that Rommel had more than limited and superficial knowledge of the plot" and concludes that he would not have acted to aid the plotters in the aftermath of the attempt on 20 July, while the historian Ralf Georg Reuth contends that "there was no indication of any active participation of Rommel in the conspiracy." The historian Richard J. Evans concluded that he knew of a plot, but was not involved.

What is not debated are the results of the failed bomb plot of 20 July. Many conspirators were arrested and the dragnet expanded to thousands. Consequently, it did not take long for Rommel to come under suspicion. He was primarily implicated through his connection to Kluge. Rommel's name also came up in confessions made under torture by Stülpnagel and Hofacker, and was included in Goerdeler's papers on a list of potential supporters. Hofacker confessed that Rommel had agreed to demand for Hitler to step down, and if he refused, Rommel would join the other conspirators in deposing Hitler. Rommel was also planned to become a member of the post-Hitler government in papers drawn up by Goerdeler.

Hitler knew it would cause a major scandal on the home front to have the popular Rommel publicly branded as a traitor. With this in mind, he opted to give Rommel the option of suicide via cyanide or a public trial by Freisler's People's Court. Rommel was well aware that being hauled before the People's Court was tantamount to a death sentence. He also knew that if he chose to stand trial, his family would have been severely punished even before the all-but-certain conviction and execution. With this in mind, he committed suicide on 14 October 1944. He was buried with full military honours and his family was spared from persecution; his cause of death did not come to light until after the war.

== Criticism ==
=== Involvement in war crimes and atrocities ===
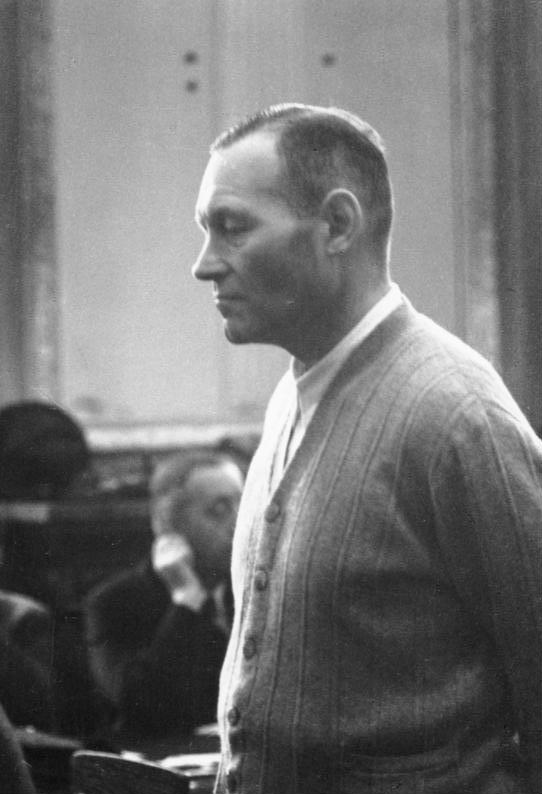
General Erich Hoepner at the Volksgerichtshof. In 1941, Hoepner called for an extermination war against the Slavs in the Soviet Union.

Involvement of the plotters in war crimes and atrocities has been studied by historians such as Christian Gerlach. Gerlach proved that plotters such as Tresckow and Gersdorff were aware of mass murder happening in the East from at least 1941. He writes: "Especially with reference to the murder of the Jews, [it is said that] 'the SS' had deceived the officers by killing in secret, filing incomplete reports or none at all; if general staff officers protested, the SS threatened them." Gerlach concludes: "This is, of course, nonsense."

Tresckow also "signed orders for the deportation of thousands of orphaned children for forced labor in the Reich"—the so-called Heu-Aktion. Such actions led historians to question the motives of the plotters, which seemed more concerned with the military situation than with Nazi atrocities and German war crimes. However some others assert that, in such actions, Tresckow had to act out of principle to continue with his coup plans.

Gerlach pointed out that the plotters had "selective moral criteria" and while they were concerned about Jews being exterminated in the Holocaust, they were far less disturbed about mass murder of civilians in the East. To Gerlach, the primary motivation of the plotters was to ensure German victory in the war or at least prevent defeat. Gerlach's arguments were later supported by the historian Hans Mommsen, who stated that the plotters were interested above all in military victory. However, Gerlach's arguments were also criticised by some scholars, among them Peter Hoffmann from McGill University and Klaus Jochen Arnold from the Konrad-Adenauer-Stiftung. While acknowledging that Tresckow and other 20 July conspirators had been involved in war crimes, Arnold writes that Gerlach's argument is oversimplified. In 2011 Danny Orbach, a Harvard University-based historian, wrote that Gerlach's reading of the sources is highly skewed, and, at times, diametrically opposed to what they actually say. In one case, according to Orbach, Gerlach had falsely paraphrased the memoir of the resistance fighter Colonel Rudolf Christoph Freiherr von Gersdorff, and in another case, quoted misleadingly from an SS document.

== Commemoration and collective memory ==
A 1951 survey by the Allensbach Institute revealed that "Only a third of respondents had a positive opinion about the men and women who had tried unsuccessfully to overthrow the Nazi regime."

The "first official memorial service for the resistance fighters of 20 July" was held on the tenth anniversary in 1954. In his speech at the event, Theodor Heuss, the first President of the Federal Republic of Germany, said that "harsh words" were necessary, and that "There have been cases of refusal to carry out orders that have achieved historic greatness." After this speech, public opinion in Germany began to shift.

Nonetheless, a 1956 proposal to name a school after Claus Schenk Graf von Stauffenberg was opposed by a majority of citizens, and, according to Deutsche Welle (in 2014):

East Germany's communist leadership had ignored the assassination attempt for decades, mainly because the conservative and aristocratic conspirators around Stauffenberg did not match the socialist ideal.

The first all-German commemoration of the event did not take place until 1990. In 2013 the last surviving member of the plot, Ewald-Heinrich von Kleist-Schmenzin, died in Munich. The resistance fighters are generally considered heroes in Germany, according to Deutsche Welle in 2014.

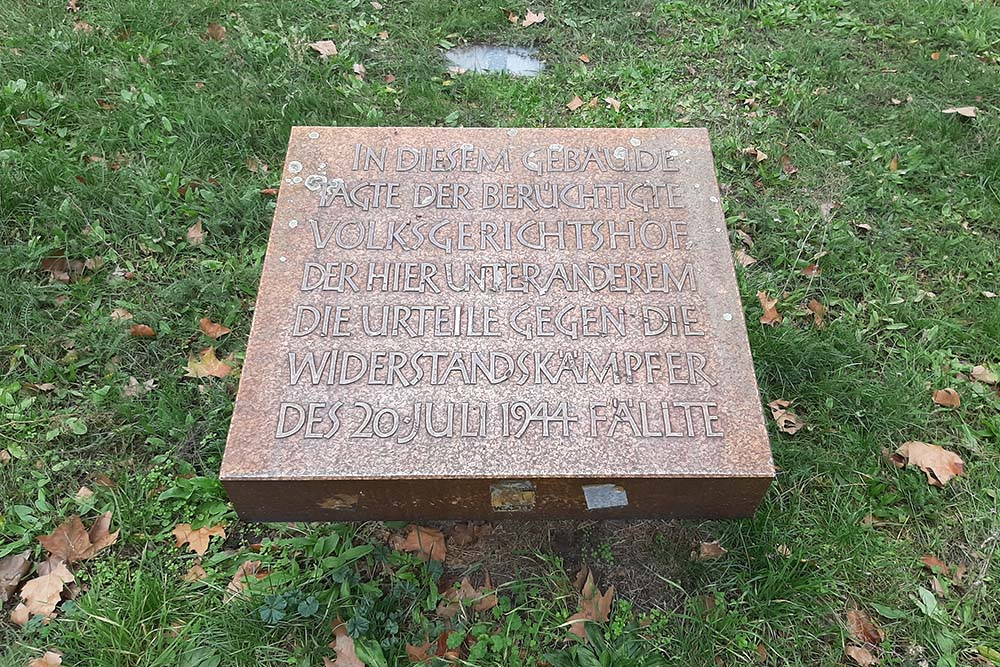
Memorial to the victims of the People's Court outside the Kammergericht Berlin

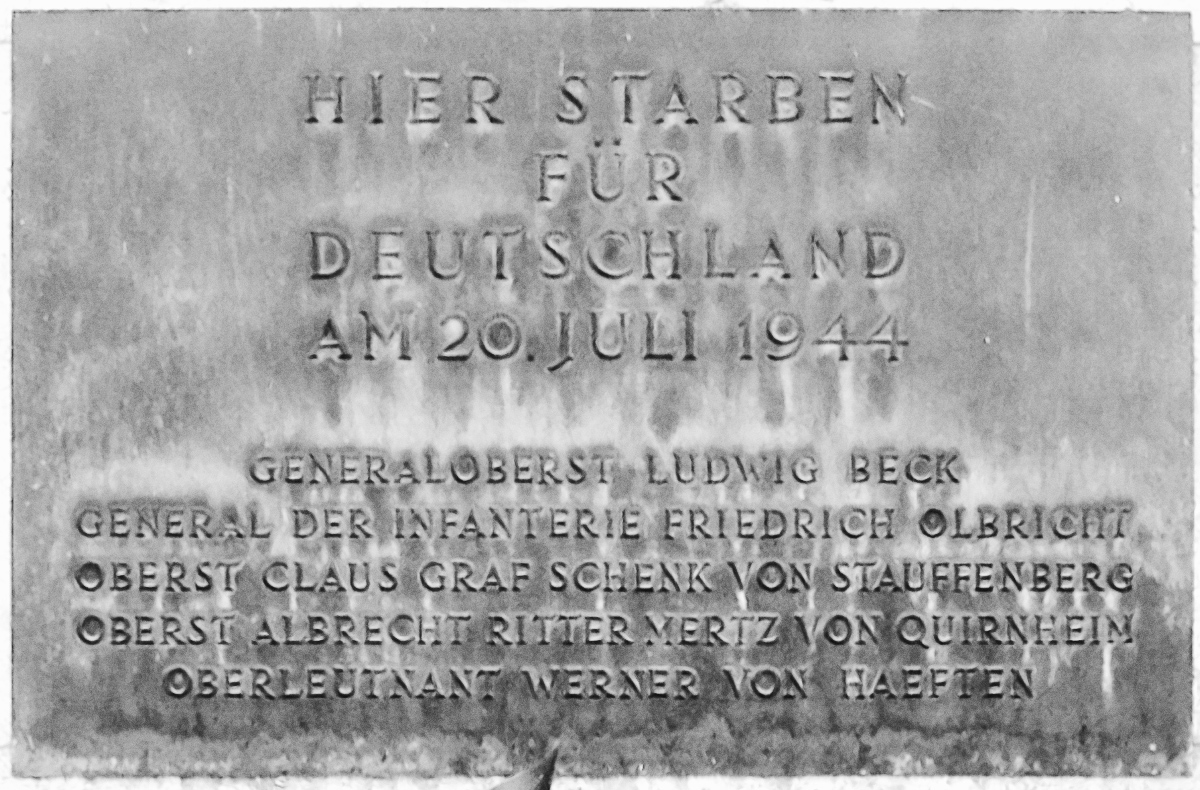
Memorial at the Bendlerblock: "Here died for Germany on 20 July 1944" (followed by the names of the principal conspirators)

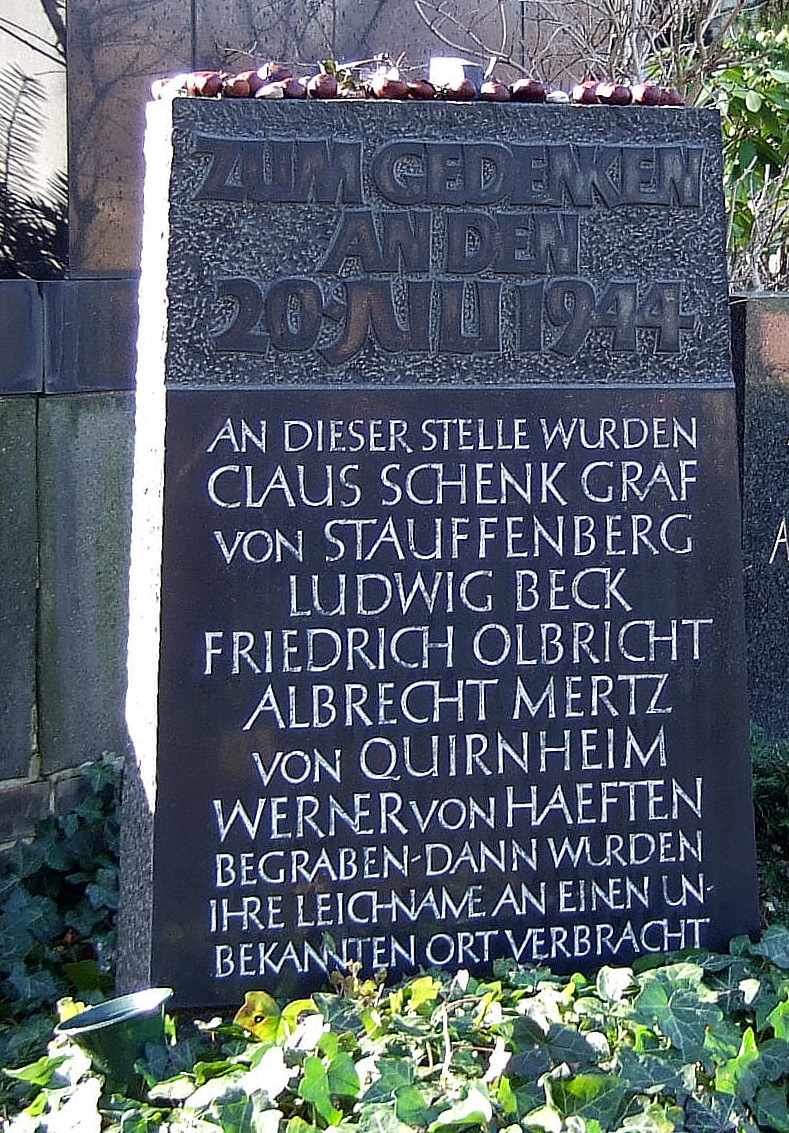
Memorial at the cemetery (Alter St.-Matthäus-Kirchhof, Berlin) where the corpses were buried but afterwards removed to an unknown place

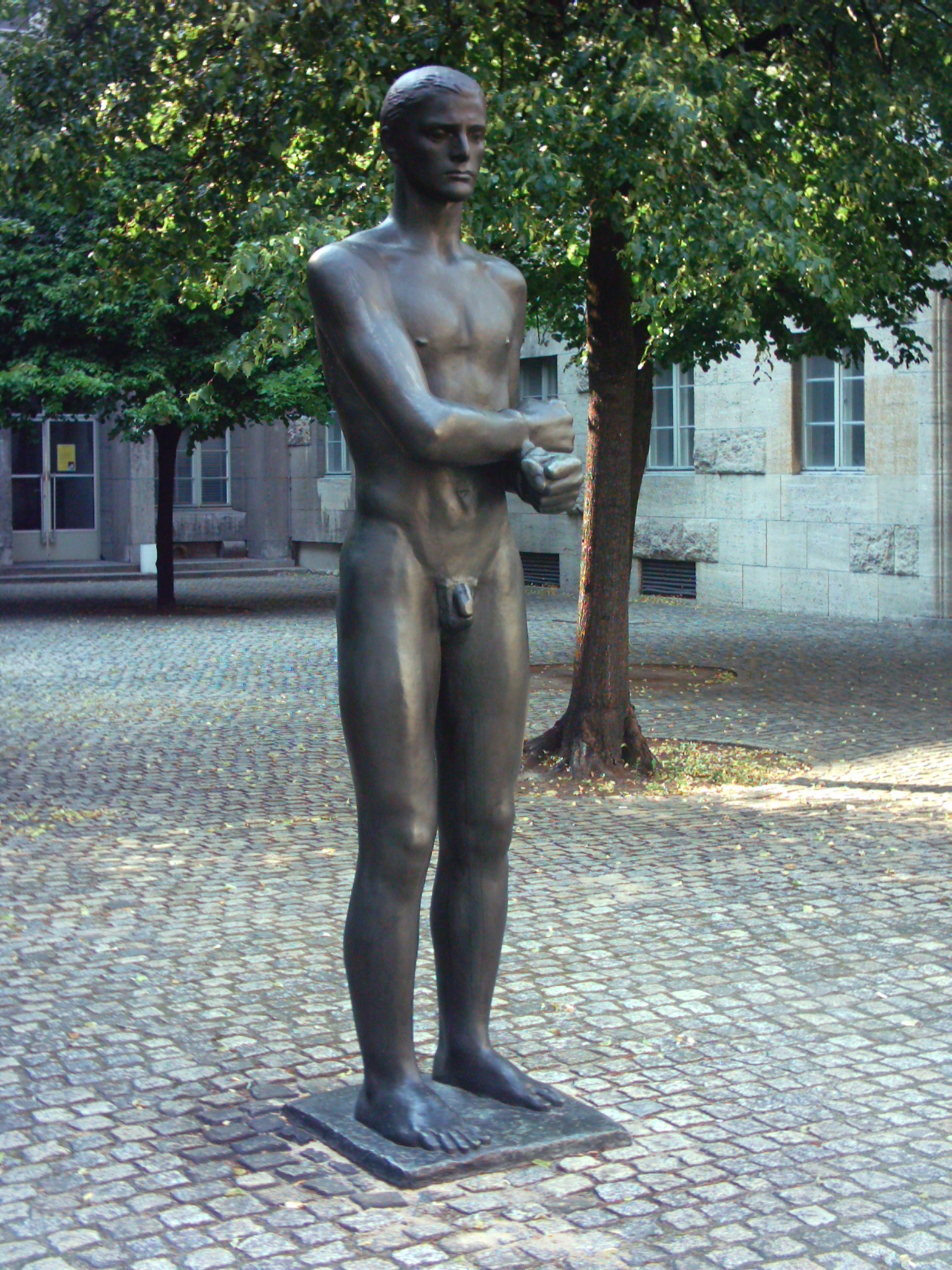
Memorial statue at the Bendlerblock by Richard Scheibe

In 1989, American Gothic Rock band Christian Death released a song entitled ”Nazi Killer” about this assassination attempt. The song was featured on their album All the Love All the Hate (Part Two: All the Hate).

== See also ==
- Assassination attempts on Adolf Hitler
- Black Orchestra
- Conspiracy theories about Adolf Hitler's death
- The Desert Fox (film) – 1951 film
- Jackboot Mutiny – 1955 film
- List of members of the 20 July plot
- Operation Valkyrie: The Stauffenberg Plot to Kill Hitler – 2008 documentary film
- The Plot to Assassinate Hitler – 1955 film
- The Plot to Kill Hitler – 1990 film
- Stauffenberg (film) – 2004 film
- Treason (1959 film)
- Valkyrie (film) – 2008 film
- Walter Gramsch

== Bibliography ==
- Beckett, I.F.W. (2014). Rommel Reconsidered. Mechanicsburg: Stackpole. ISBN 978-0811714624. Archived from the original on 2 July 2024.
- Boeselager, von, P. (2009). Valkyrie: The Plot To Kill Hitler. New York City: Hachette. ISBN 978-0297857549. Archived from the original on 2 July 2024.
- Büchner, A. (1991). German Infantry Handbook, 1939–1945: Organization, Uniforms, Weapons, Equipment, and Operations. Atglen: Schiffer. ISBN 978-0887402845. Archived from the original on 2 July 2024.
- Carsten, F. L. "The German Generals and Hitler" History Today (Aug 1958) 8#8 pp 556–564.
- Evans, R.J. (2009) [2008]. The Third Reich at War: How the Nazis Led Germany from Conquest to Disaster. Vol. 3. London: Penguin. ISBN 978-0141015484. Archived from the original on 2 July 2024.
- Evans, Richard J. (22 January 2009). "Sein wahres Gesicht". SZ Magazin (in German). Archived from the original on 13 August 2021.
- Evans, R.J. (2015) [1997]. Rereading German History: From Unification to Reunification 1800–1996. Abingdon: Routledge. ISBN 978-1317541882. Archived from the original on 2 July 2024.
- Fest, J.C. (1997) [1996]. Plotting Hitler's Death: The Story of German Resistance. New York City: Henry Holt and Company. ISBN 978-0805056488.
- Galante, P.; Silianoff, E. (1981). Operation Valkyrie: The German Generals' Plot Against Hitler. New York City: Harper & Row. ISBN 978-0060380021. Archived from the original on 2 July 2024.
- Hart, R.A. (2014). "Rommel and the 20th July Bomb Plot". Rommel Reconsidered. By Beckett, I.F.W. Mechanicsburg: Stackpole. ISBN 978-0811714624.
- Hoffmann, P.C.W. (1996). History of the German Resistance, 1933–1945. Montreal: McGill-Queen's. ISBN 978-0773515314.
- Kurtz, Harold (1974). "The July Plot". In Taylor, A. J. P.; Mayer, S. L. (eds.). History of World War II. London: Octopus Books. ISBN 0-7064-0399-1.
- Moorhouse, R. (2007) [2006]. Killing Hitler: The Plots, the Assassins, and the Dictator Who Cheated Death. New York City: Bantam. ISBN 978-0553382556.
- Reitlinger, G.R. (1989) [1956]. The SS: Alibi of a Nation, 1922–1945. New York City: Da Capo. ISBN 978-0306803512.
- Reuth, R.G. (2005) [2004]. Rommel: The End of a Legend. London: Haus. ISBN 978-1904950202.
- Ritter, G. (1984), Carl Goerdeler und die deutsche Widerstandsbewegung (4th ed.), Stuttgart: DVA, ISBN 3-421-06181-5
- Schrader, H. (2009). Codename Valkyrie: General Friedrich Olbricht and the Plot Against Hitler. Sparkford: Haynes. ISBN 978-1844255337.
- Shirer, W.L. (2011) [1960]. The Rise and Fall of the Third Reich. New York City: RosettaBooks. ISBN 978-0795317002.
- Wheeler-Bennett, J. (2005) [1967]. The Nemesis of Power: The German Army in Politics 1918–1945. London: Palgrave Macmillan. ISBN 978-1403918123.
- Terentiev V. O. Consequences of the assassination attempt on Hitler on July 20, 1944 for the internal politics of the Third Reich Archived 19 June 2024 at the Wayback Machine // Klio. №5 (209). 2024. P. 58 - 65
- Terentiev V. O. The Position of the German Nobility in the Third Reich After the Assassination Attempt on Hitler on 20 July 1944 // Klio. №6 (222). 2025. P. 105 - 111
