= Heinz Brandt =

German army officer and equestrian (1907–1944)

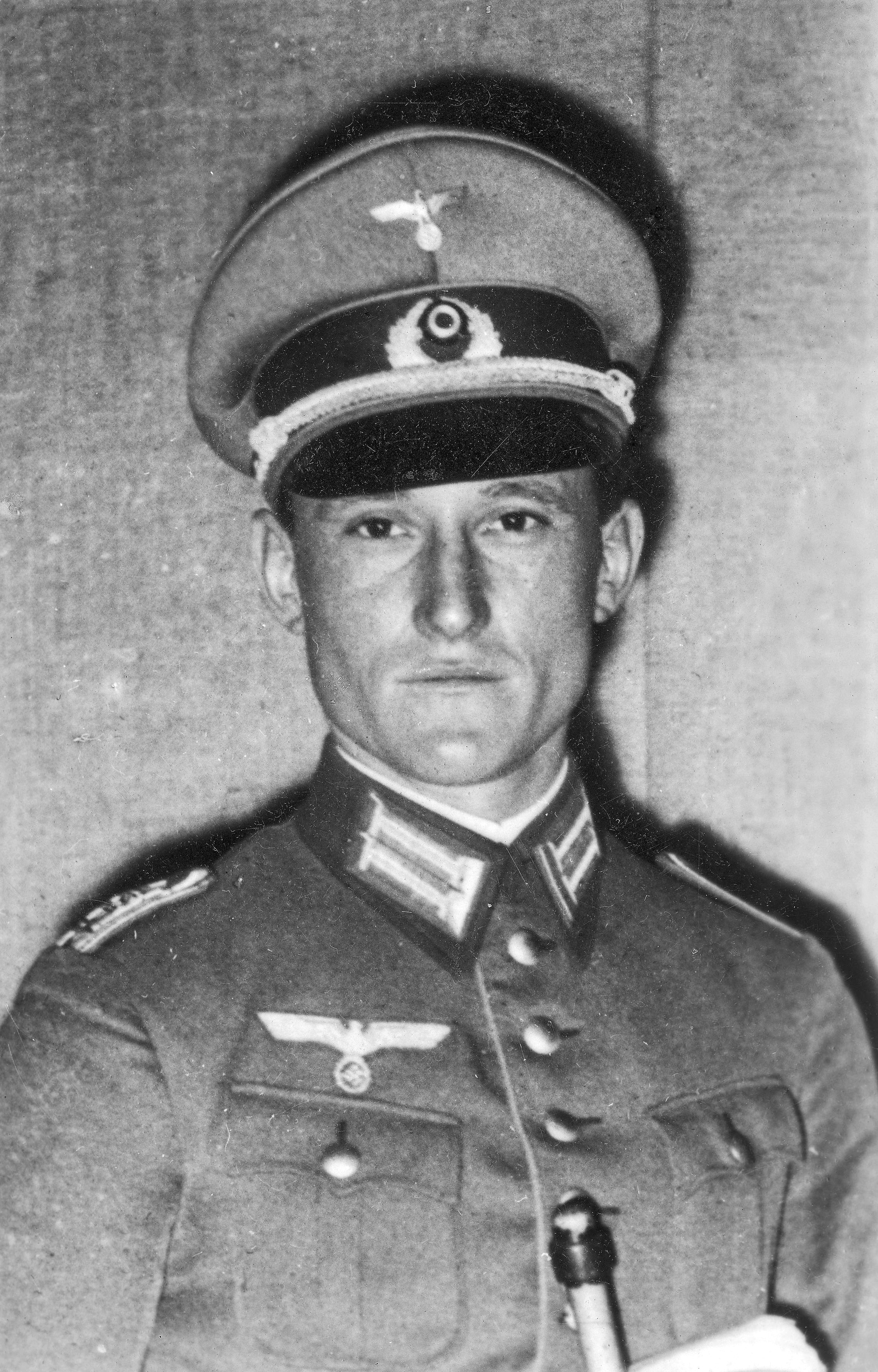
- Brandt, c. 1933–1936
- Born: 11 March 1907; Charlottenburg, Berlin, Germany
- Died: 21 July 1944 (aged 37); Carlshof, East Prussia, Germany
- Military career
- Allegiance: Weimar Republic; Nazi Germany
- Branch: German Army
- Service years: 1925–1944
- Rank: Generalmajor (posthumously)
- Conflicts: World War II; 20 July plot X
- Sports career
- Country: Germany
- Sport: Equestrian
Medal record
Olympic Games
Gold medal – first place	1936 Berlin	Show jumping, Team

Heinz Brandt (11 March 1907 – 21 July 1944) was a German officer. During World War II he served as an aide to General Adolf Heusinger, the head of the operations unit of the General Staff. He may have inadvertently saved Adolf Hitler's life, at the cost of his own, by moving the bomb planted by Claus von Stauffenberg during the 20 July plot.

== Early life ==
Brandt, the son of later General der Kavallerie Georg Brandt, was born in Charlottenburg (now Berlin). He joined the Reichswehr in 1925. Brandt attended a course at the cavalry school in Hanover from 1927 to 1928 and was commissioned a lieutenant. In 1936 he was a member of the gold medal-winning German show jumping team in the equestrian event at the Berlin Summer Olympics, on his horse Alchemy.

== Second World War ==
At the outbreak of the Second World War, he was a Hauptmann on the general staff of the Oberkommando der Wehrmacht. After serving in an infantry division he was promoted to major in January 1941 and Oberstleutnant in April 1942.

On 13 March 1943, Brandt was an unwitting participant in an attempt to assassinate Hitler. Generalmajor Henning von Tresckow instructed Lieutenant Fabian von Schlabrendorff to ask Brandt to carry a package containing bottles of what he claimed was Cointreau onto Hitler's Condor plane for delivery to Oberst Helmuth Stieff as payment for a lost bet. The package in fact contained a primed bomb, which in the event failed to detonate.

In May 1943, Brandt was promoted to Oberst (colonel).

=== 20 July bomb ===
On 20 July 1944, Brandt arrived at the Wolf's Lair headquarters in Rastenburg, East Prussia for a situation conference attended by Hitler. With the assistance of Major Ernst John von Freyend, Colonel Claus von Stauffenberg put a briefcase containing a primed bomb at Brandt's feet as close as possible to Hitler and to the right of General Heusinger, who was standing next to him. Stauffenberg then made an excuse that he had a phone call and left the room. Soon after he left, Brandt wanted to get a better look at a map on the table. He found the briefcase in his way and moved it to the other side of a thick, strong table leg. Seven minutes later, the bomb exploded and blew one of Brandt's legs off. He died the next day after surgery in the Wolf's Lair hospital and was posthumously promoted to Generalmajor by Hitler. Three other people also died as a result of the explosion. It was later determined that the bomb's exact positioning next to a leg of the map table was a crucial factor in determining who in the room survived, and Brandt is generally credited with inadvertently saving Hitler's life.

== Media portrayals ==
- In the 1971 Eastern Bloc co-production Liberation: Direction of the Main Blow, Brandt was portrayed by the East German actor Fritz-Ernst Fechner.
- In the 2008 film Valkyrie, Heinz Brandt is portrayed by British actor Tom Hollander.
