= Herbert Büchs =

Lieutenant General of the German Air Force (1913–1996)

- Born: 20 November 1913; Beuthen, Upper Silesia, German Empire (now Bytom, Poland)
- Died: 19 May 1996 (aged 82); Meckenheim, Germany
- Military career
- Allegiance: Germany
- Branch: German Air Force
- Rank: Generalleutnant
- Commands: CS Armed Forces Staff; Deputy Inspector General of the Bundeswehr

Herbert Büchs (20 November 1913 – 19 May 1996) was a lieutenant general of the German Air Force and a former Luftwaffe staff officer in Nazi Germany's Oberkommando der Wehrmacht (OKW) during World War II. As second adjutant to General Alfred Jodl with the rank of major he is notable for being present in the conference room when the 20 July plot bomb exploded in 1944.

== Biography ==
Büchs was born in Beuthen, Upper Silesia (now Bytom, Poland), where he graduated from the Catholic secondary school in 1933. He then studied economics at the Universities of Graz and Munich. He joined the air force in 1935 and became a fighter pilot. In 1939 at the outbreak of World War II he was an operations officer and in June 1941 he flew a Junkers Ju 88 during Operation Barbarossa and his right arm was injured by machine gun fire. On 1 November 1943 he was appointed as a General Staff Officer with the Wehrmacht Operations Staff at Adolf Hitler's headquarters. He briefed him on the air war at daily situation conferences and on one occasion had to report the loss of 300 aircraft.

In July, 1944, Büchs was injured by the briefcase bomb planted by Claus von Stauffenberg in a failed assassination attempt on Hitler. He recovered from his injuries. In 1945, he was taken prisoner by the Americans. He was released from custody in 1948.

In June 1946 he provided testimony as a witness at the Nuremberg Trials. He then worked in civil engineering on projects in the Middle East and in 1957 rejoined the military and became an aerial tactics instructor at the Bundeswehr Staff College. He later rose to be deputy director of Leadership on the Air Force Command Staff and Chief of Staff of the Federal Armed Forces Operations Staff.

Military offices
| Preceded by Generalleutnant Gustav-Adolf Kuntzen | Deputy Chief of Staff of the Federal Armed Forces; 1967–1971 | Succeeded by Generalleutnant Bernd Freytag von Loringhoven |
