= Ernst John von Freyend =

German army officer

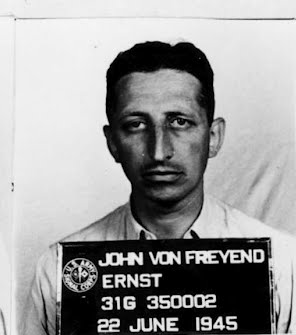
- Freyend in 1945
- Born: 25 March 1909; Breslau
- Died: 24 March 1980 (aged 70)
- Military career
- Allegiance: Nazi Germany
- Branch: German Army
- Rank: Oberst
- Unit: Oberkommando der Wehrmacht
- Conflicts: World War II

Ernst John von Freyend (25 March 1909 – 24 March 1980) was a German Oberkommando der Wehrmacht officer who served during World War II as the adjutant to Field Marshal Wilhelm Keitel. He is notable for unwittingly helping to place the 20 July plot bomb that was intended to kill Adolf Hitler.

== Biography ==
On 20 July 1944, he held the rank of Major and arrived at the Wolf's Lair headquarters in Rastenburg, East Prussia for a situation conference attended by Hitler. Also, there as a subordinate to Field Marshal Keitel was Colonel Claus von Stauffenberg, who arrived clutching a briefcase. As Stauffenberg was disabled following the loss of his right hand and two fingers from his left hand, von Freyend offered to carry it for him. Stauffenberg at first refused, but then relented upon approaching the conference room, and he asked von Freyend to put him as near as possible to Hitler so that "I catch everything the Führer says for my briefing afterwards". Freyend placed the briefcase by the conference map table to the right of General Adolf Heusinger, who was standing next to Hitler, and Stauffenberg adjusted its position. However, Heinz Brandt, wanting to get a closer look at a map on the table, re-positioned the briefcase farther away from Hitler on the other side of a thick table leg. Seven minutes later the bomb exploded. It was later concluded that its exact positioning next to the table leg was a crucial factor in determining who in the room survived.

Freyend survived the explosion and the remainder of the war. After surrendering with Keitel, he was briefly interned and interrogated by the Americans, who decided that he was not involved in military decision-making and acted mainly as Keitel's valet. In the early 1950s, he became an employee of Gehlen Organization.

== Portrayal in the media ==
Von Freyend has been portrayed by the following actors in film productions.

- Manfred Bendik in the 1971 Eastern Bloc co-production Liberation: Direction of the Main Blow.
- Michael Fitzgerald in the 1990 US television movie The Plot to Kill Hitler.
- Andy Gätjen in the 2004 German TV movie Stauffenberg.
- Karl Richter in the 2004 German movie Downfall.
- Werner Daehn in the 2008 US film Valkyrie.
