= Karl Bodenschatz =

German general (1890–1979)

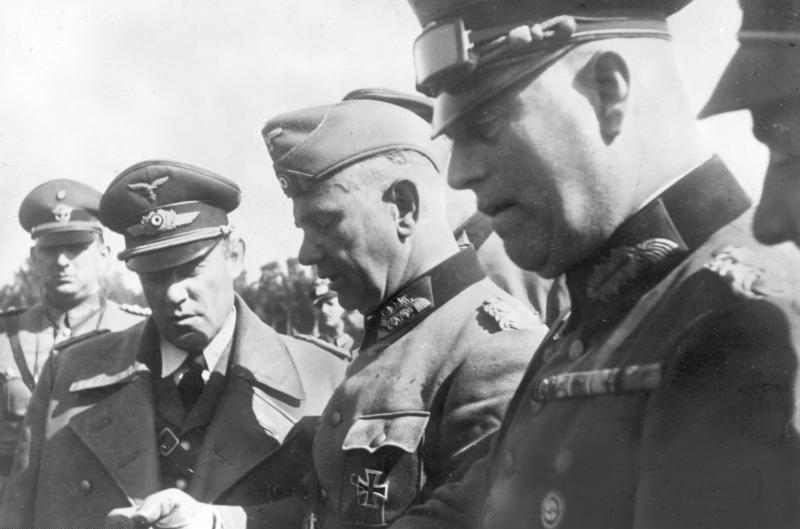
- Left to right: Kurt Daluege, Karl Bodenschatz, Walter von Reichenau and Wilhelm Keitel in September 1939.
- Born: 10 December 1890; Rehau, Upper Franconia, Kingdom of Bavaria, German Empire
- Died: 25 August 1979 (aged 88); Erlangen, Bavaria, West Germany
- Military career
- Allegiance: Kingdom of Bavaria; German Empire; Weimar Republic; Nazi Germany
- Branch: Bavarian Army; Imperial German Army; Freikorps; Reichsheer; Luftwaffe
- Service years: 1910–1945
- Rank: General der Flieger
- Conflicts: World War I World War II

Karl Georg Bodenschatz (sometimes wrongly Karl-Heinrich; 10 December 1890 – 25 August 1979) was a German general who was the adjutant to Manfred von Richthofen in World War I and the liaison officer between Hermann Göring and Adolf Hitler in World War II.

== Biography ==
=== Early life and First World War ===
Bodenschatz was born in Rehau, Kingdom of Bavaria in 1890. He enlisted in the Royal Bavarian 8th Infantry Regiment (Königlich Bayerisches 8. Infanterie-Regiment „Großherzog Friedrich II. von Baden“) in Metz on 23 July 1910 and was commanded to War School in Munich. He was commissioned a Leutnant (2nd Lieutenant) on 28 October 1912. Following the German entry into World War I, he saw active infantry service on the Western Front and participated in the Battle of Verdun. After being wounded four times, on 15 July 1916, now a 1st Lieutenant (since 16 March 1916), he transferred to the Deutsche Luftstreitkräfte. He served as an adjutant in Jagdstaffel 2 ("Jasta Boelcke") and then in Jagdgeschwader 1 based at Avesnes-le-sac. He was adjutant to Manfred von Richthofen and later, after the deaths of Manfred von Richthofen and his successor Wilhelm Reinhard, to Hermann Göring, who took over command of the fighter wing in June 1918.

=== Between the wars ===
After the war, Bodenschatz was carried over into the Reichswehr as a regular officer and served in the 21st (Bavarian) Infantry Regiment from 1919 until April 1933. He had maintained a friendship with Göring and joined the Luftwaffe as his military adjutant, serving in this capacity until 1938, visiting Britain in November 1938. In 1939, he warned the Polish military attaché in Berlin that Nazi Germany was planning to invade Poland by the end of the year.

=== Second World War ===
During World War II he was the liaison officer between Hitler's headquarters and the Commander-in-Chief of the Luftwaffe until he was seriously injured in 1944 by the 20 July plot bomb at the Wolf's Lair headquarters in Rastenburg, East Prussia. He was fortunate to survive the explosion as two officers immediately to his left and one to his right were killed.

=== Post-war ===
He was captured at Reichenhall on 5 May 1945 and served two years in prison. In 1946 he was called as a witness at the Nuremberg Trials of major Nazi war criminals. He died in Erlangen, West Germany, in 1979, aged 88.

== Awards and decorations (excerpt) ==
- Kingdom of Bavaria:
  - Military Merit Order, 4th Class with Swords (18 October 1914)
  - Prince Regent Luitpold Medal on the Ribbon of the Jubilee Medal for the Bavarian Army (3 March 1911)
  - Observer's Badge (6 September 1918)
- Kingdom of Prussia:
  - Iron Cross 2nd Class (10 October 1914)
  - Iron Cross 1st class (13 December 1915)
  - Flyer's Commemorative Badge (13 May 1919)
- Grand Duchy of Baden: Order of the Zähringer Lion, Knight's Cross 2nd Class with Swords (6 October 1914)
- German Empire: Wound Badge in Silver (mattweiß) (1 August 1918)
- Ottoman Empire: War Medal ("Iron Crescent") (13 November 1917)
- Nazi Germany:
  - Wehrmacht Long Service Award, 4th to 1st class (2 October 1936)
  - German Olympic Decoration, 1st Class (1 December 1936)
  - Golden Party Badge (10 December 1940)
  - War Merit Cross (1939), 1st and 2nd Class with Swords
  - German Cross in Silver on 30 May 1942 as General der Flieger and chief of Ministeramt in the Reichsluftfahrtministerium with the Oberbefehlshaber der Luftwaffe
  - Wound Badge of 20 July 1944 in Gold
- Finland: Order of the Cross of Liberty, 1st Class with Oakleaves and Swords
