= Heinz Assmann =

German naval officer (1904–1954)

Captain Heinz Assmann (15 August 1904 in Stendal – 15 October 1954 in Hamburg) was a German naval officer who was a Kriegsmarine staff officer in Nazi Germany's Oberkommando der Wehrmacht (OKW) during World War II. He is notable for being present in the conference room when the 20 July plot bomb exploded in 1944 and after the war for providing his recollections of the many briefings for Adolf Hitler that he attended.

== Biography ==
Assmann was born in Stendal in the Province of Saxony. He joined the Reichsmarine in 1922 and was appointed an Admiralty staff officer in the Eastern Naval Group Command in November 1938. He then served in the Naval Operations Division and as the first officer on the battleship Tirpitz from October 1942 to August 1943. He was a general staff officer at OKW from September 1943 to May 1945. From 1953 to 1954 he was a member of the Hamburg Parliament.
