= Walther Buhle =

German general (1894–1959)

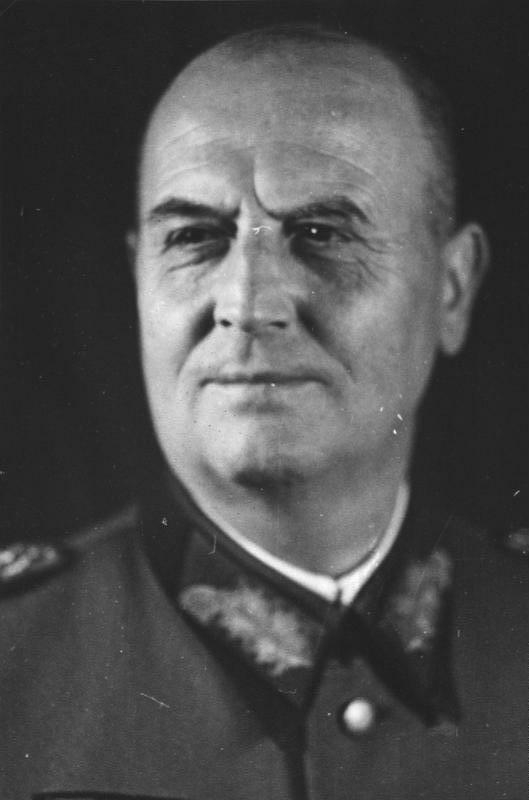
- Buhle in 1944
- Born: 26 October 1894; Heilbronn, Grand Duchy of Baden, German Empire
- Died: 28 December 1959 (aged 65); Stuttgart, West Germany
- Military career
- Allegiance: German Empire; Weimar Republic; Nazi Germany
- Branch: German Army
- Rank: General der Infanterie
- Unit: V Army Corps
- Commands: Chief of Organizations Section Oberkommando des Heeres; Chief of Armaments for the Army
- Conflicts: World War I World War II

General Walther Buhle (26 October 1894 – 28 December 1959) was an infantry General in the German army who was the Chief of the Army Staff of the Oberkommando der Wehrmacht from 1942 and chief of armaments for the army in 1945.

== Career ==
He was born in Heilbronn, Baden-Württemberg and joined the army as a cadet in July 1913. During World War I he was an officer in the infantry. In 1915 he was seriously wounded. Between the wars he served on the General Staff of the Reichswehr and the infantry and cavalry and by the outbreak of World War II he had reached the rank of Oberst in the Wehrmacht and was appointed chief of the organizations section of the Oberkommando des Heeres as senior officer to Claus von Stauffenberg.

He was badly injured and hospitalised in 1944 by the 20 July plot bomb planted by von Stauffenberg at the Wolf's Lair headquarters in Rastenburg, East Prussia. He entered the conference room with von Stauffenberg and when a point was raised that von Stauffenberg might have been expected to answer, Buhle was perplexed that he was no longer present and looked for him in the corridor. A telephonist said he had left the building so he returned to the conference.

Buhle recovered from his injuries and in the last days of Nazi Germany, Adolf Hitler appointed him chief of armaments for the army. After the war, he was a POW at Camp Ritchie in Maryland and was involved with the Hill Project, an effort to use German POWs to translate texts to better understand military efforts of the Nazi regime following the end of the war. Following his return, he was imprisoned until June 1947, he then lived in Stuttgart where he died aged 65.

== Decorations and awards ==
- Iron Cross of 1914, 1st and 2nd class
- Knight's Cross of the Royal House Order of Hohenzollern with Swords
- Knight's Cross of the Military Merit Order (Württemberg)
- Wound Badge (1918) in Black
- Iron Cross of 1939, 1st and 2nd class
- Wound Badge (20 July 1944)
