= Hellmuth Stieff =

German Generalmajor (1901–1944)

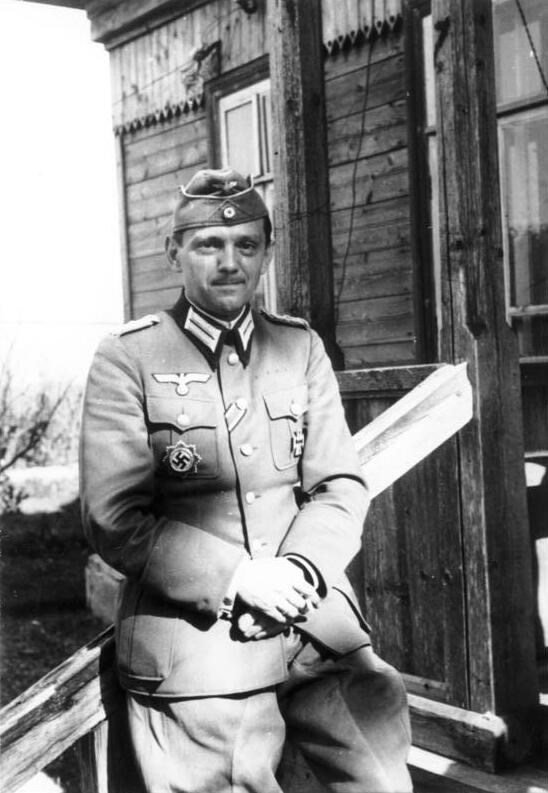
- Stieff in 1942
- Born: 6 June 1901; Deutsch Eylau, West Prussia, German Empire
- Died: 8 August 1944 (aged 43); Plötzensee Prison, Berlin, Nazi Germany
- Cause of death: Execution by hanging
- Military career
- Allegiance: Weimar Republic; Nazi Germany
- Branch: German Army
- Service years: 1918–1944
- Rank: Generalmajor
- Commands: Chief of Organisation at OKH
- Conflicts: World War I World War II
- Awards: German Cross in Gold; Iron Cross 1st Class; Eastern Front Medal

Hellmuth Ludwig Gustav Arnold Stieff (6 June 1901 – 8 August 1944) was a German general and a member of the OKH (German Army Headquarters) during World War II. He took part in attempts by the German resistance to assassinate Adolf Hitler on 7 and 20 July 1944.

== Early career ==
Stieff was born in Deutsch Eylau (now Iława, Poland) in the province of West Prussia as the son of Artillery Major Wilhelm Bruno Walter Stieff and his wife Anna Laura Maria Carla néé Krause. He graduated early in July 1918 in order to enter the Imperial German Army and was assigned with the rank of Kriegsfreiwilliger (rough equivalent to Private) to the replacement battalion of Feldartillerie-Regiment Nr. 71 "Groß-Komtur". Stieff completed his training in September that year and was transferred to 2. Westpreußisches Feldartillerie-Regiment Nr. 36. He took part in the final combats on the Western Front and was accepted in the reduced Reichswehr following the Armistice.

Stieff was promoted to Fähnrich (Warrant Officer) in 1920 and later ordered to the Infanterieschule München. Upon his graduation, he was commissioned a second lieutenant in December 1922 and assigned to 3rd Artillery Regiment in Potsdam. Stieff served with that outfit until May 1932 and was promoted to First lieutenant during that time.

In May 1933, Stieff was transferred to the Truppenamt (the cover organisation for the German General Staff) under General Ludwig Beck and served in the section for officers training for two years, before ordered to the Staff College in Berlin. He was meanwhile promoted to Captain in April 1934.

Upon graduation in October 1935, Stieff was assigned to the headquarters of 21st Infantry Division in Elbing, East Prussia and served as Second General Staff officer under Generalleutnant Albert Wodrig until October 1937, when he was transferred to Landau in der Pfalz as Commander of 4th Battery within 33rd Artillery Regiment under Colonel Wilhelm Berlin.

== World War II ==
In mid-November 1938, Stieff was transferred back to the General Staff in Berlin as newly promoted Major and assigned as Group leader in the Organisationsabteilung (coordination department) under lieutenant colonel Adolf Heusinger. During the Invasion of Poland, he made an inspection tour of the frontlines and was horrified when he witnessed atrocities Einsatzgruppen units were perpetrating. When in Warsaw in November 1939, he wrote letters to his wife expressing his disgust for and despair over Hitler's conduct of the war and the atrocities committed in occupied Poland. From that onwards, Stieff conceived an abhorrence for the Nazi military strategy. He wrote that he had become the "tool of a despotic will to destroy without regard for humanity and simple decency." He was promoted to lieutenant colonel (Oberstleutnant) in November 1940.

In October 1941, Stieff was transferred at the Eastern Front and joined the headquarters of 4th Army as Chief of Operations. He served consecutively under Generals Günther von Kluge, Ludwig Kübler and Gotthard Heinrici participating in the planning of 4th Army's operations for Battle of Moscow and Case Blue. For his service in that capacity, Stieff was decorated with German Cross in Gold, both classes of the Iron Cross and Bulgarian Order of Bravery IV. Class with Swords. He was promoted to Colonel (Oberst) on 1 June 1942.

Recognized for his excellent organizational skills, Stieff was ordered back to Berlin in October 1942 and appointed Chief of Organisation Department at OKH, despite Hitler's strong personal dislike. Hitler called the young, diminutive Stieff a "poisonous little dwarf." For his new assignment, he was later promoted to Generalmajor on 1 February 1944.

== Resistance fighter ==
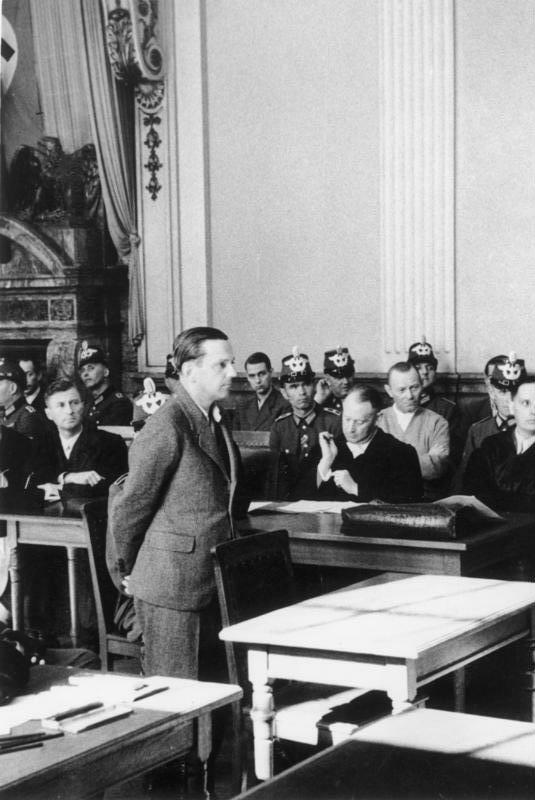
Hellmuth Stieff on trial at the People's Court on 7 August, the day before his hanging.

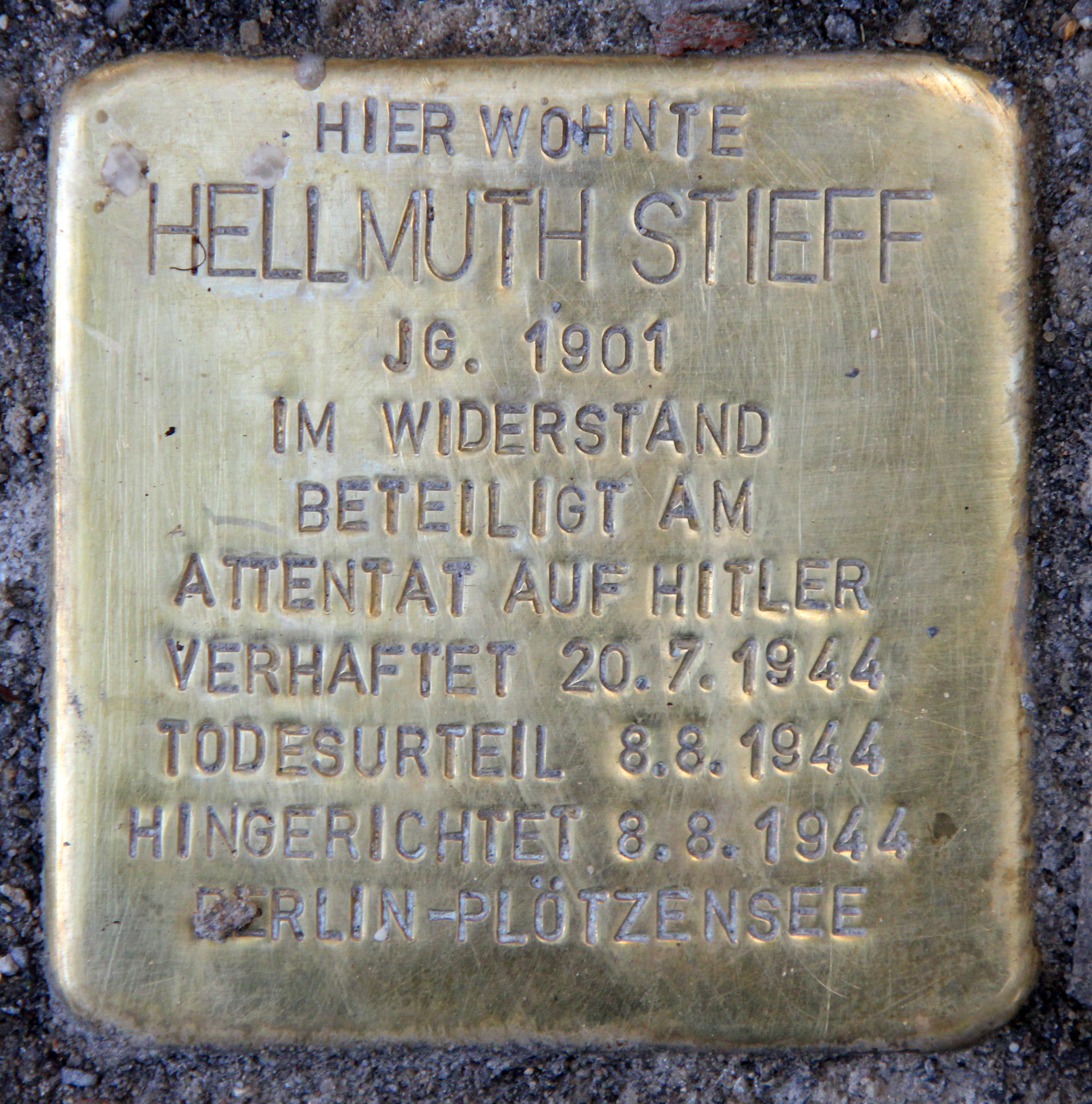
Commemorative plaque dedicated to Stieff on the wall of a Berlin building where he once lived.

Invited by General Henning von Tresckow, Stieff joined the German resistance in summer 1943. Taking advantage of being in charge of Organisationsabteilung, he acquired and kept all sorts of explosives, including some from foreign sources. He provided the explosives for von dem Bussche's canceled assassination attempt on Hitler at the Wolfsschanze (Wolf's Lair) in November.

As one of the officers who had occasional access to Hitler, he volunteered to kill Hitler himself in a suicide attack but later backed away despite repeated requests from Tresckow and Colonel Claus von Stauffenberg to carry out the assassination. On 7 July 1944, during a demonstration of new uniforms to Hitler at Schloss Klessheim, a palace near Salzburg, Stieff was indisposed to trigger the bomb. Stauffenberg, therefore, decided to kill Hitler himself.

In the morning of 20 July, Stieff flew with Stauffenberg and Lieutenant Werner von Haeften in the Heinkel He 111 plane provided by General Eduard Wagner from Berlin to the Wolfsschanze. In the night he was arrested and brutally interrogated under torture by the Gestapo. Stieff held out for several days against all attempts to extract the names of fellow conspirators. Ousted by the Wehrmacht, he was tried by the People's Court (Volksgerichtshof) under President Roland Freisler and sentenced to death on 8 August 1944. At Hitler's personal request, Stieff was executed by hanging in the afternoon of that same day at Plötzensee Prison in Berlin.

== Decorations ==
- German Cross in Gold: February 16, 1942
- Iron Cross (1939)
  - 2nd Class (World War II)
  - 1st Class (World War II)
- Eastern Front Medal
- Wehrmacht Long Service Award, 1st Class
- Honour Cross of the World War 1914/1918
- Sudetenland Medal
- Bulgarian Order of Bravery IV. Class with Swords

== See also ==
- German Resistance
