= Zossen documents =

Secret archive assembled by the German military resistance

The Zossen documents (also known as the Zossen archive) were a clandestine collection of materials assembled over more than a decade by members of the German military resistance to Adolf Hitler, stored in a safe at the Oberkommando des Heeres (OKH) headquarters complex at Zossen, south of Berlin. Compiled primarily by German jurist Hans von Dohnanyi with the collaboration of Wehrmacht general Hans Oster and others in the Abwehr, the archive was intended to expose the Nazi regime's crimes and provide the evidentiary foundation for a potential postwar prosecution of its leadership. Discovered by the Gestapo on 22 September 1944 in the aftermath of the 20 July plot, the documents implicated a widening circle of conspirators; the discovery of Abwehr chief Wilhelm Canaris's personal diary (replete with additional incriminating content) in April 1945 intensified Hitler's resolve to punish the conspirators. Following a brief trial, Dohnanyi, Oster, Canaris, Bonhoeffer, and others were hanged at Flossenbürg concentration camp on 9 April 1945.

== Assembly and contents ==
Dohnanyi had compiled what his wife Christine later described as a running 'chronicle' of Nazi crimes from as early as 1933—when, serving as Personal Assistant to the Reich Minister of Justice, his privileged access to the full range of regime crimes furnished the evidentiary foundation for what would become the Zossen archive. Working within the Abwehr's coordinating section under Oster, he accumulated material from multiple sources within the conspiratorial network—including documentation gathered by Hans Bernd Gisevius—storing it alongside Oster's own operational planning study for the coup, which identified leading Nazi figures to be arrested and named the units to be deployed for their capture. Within the Abwehr, the two men operated along a clear division of labour with Oster concentrating on the military preparation of the coup, while Dohnanyi was responsible for its political preparation within the framework of the Intelligence service.

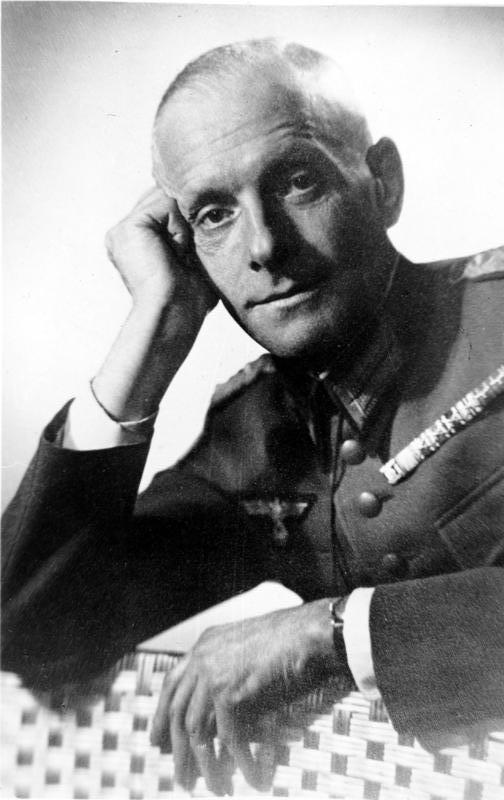
Wehrmacht general Hans Oster, co-architect of the Zossen archive and head of its military planning

Both men's ideological opposition was documented by the regime itself before the archive's assembly was complete—most directly in the 1938 report of Helmut Friedrichs, section head in the Office of the Deputy Führer, whose findings forced Dohnanyi's departure from the Reich Ministry of Justice by explicitly stating that he "showed no understanding of the racial legislation of the Third Reich" and was "inherently opposed" to its mandates. Oster later confessed at Flossenbürg that Nazi persecution of the Jews, the extermination policy, and the war itself had collectively convinced him that dismantling the SS and Gestapo alone would be insufficient to rehabilitate Germany; fellow Abwehr officer Helmuth Groscurth registered the same moral revulsion more immediately, recording in his diary following the Kristallnacht pogrom, "We must be ashamed even to be German."

Cover for the archive's most sensitive contents was provided by the Abwehr's own organizational structure and material otherwise unmistakably treasonous in any other context was camouflaged as "intelligence" material—ostensibly misleading information prepared for transmission to Germany's enemies—a designation that would later frustrate Gestapo attempts to weaponize the archive against its compilers in court.

After the Blomberg–Fritsch crisis of early 1938, the conspiratorial circle coalesced in its most definitive form—Dohnanyi working alongside Oster and Dr. Sack of the Judge Advocate-General's Department in the preliminary investigation of the fabricated case against Werner von Fritsch, with revelations of Gestapo blackmail and forgery concentrating "for the first time" upon the "various groups and personalities opposed to Hitler." Definite plans for a coup d'état followed in the spring of 1938, prepared by Oster and Dohnanyi under General Ludwig Beck's explicit instructions, with joint planning coordinated between the Abwehr circle and the growing civilian opposition around Goerdeler and Popitz.

Among the archive's more sensitive holdings was the so-called X Report drafted by Dohnanyi summarizing Josef Müller's Vatican soundings in the winter of 1939–1940, during which the British government indicated its willingness to negotiate with a successor non-Nazi German government. The X Report's contents are perhaps most fully illuminated by the diary of Ulrich von Hassell, to whom Dohnanyi showed the documents directly; Hassell recorded that Pope Pius XII had established contact with Lord Halifax through British Minister to the Holy See, Francis d'Arcy Osborne—and that the Pope seemed "willing" to accommodate German interests. However, Halifax proved more cautious, raising points such as the decentralization of Germany and an Austrian plebiscite, though the Pope had nonetheless emphasized that such conditions need not constitute barriers to peace if a broader agreement included regime change accompanied by an affirmation of Christian moral principles. (Note: Ulrich von Hassell, The Von Hassell Diaries: The Story of the Forces Against Hitler Inside Germany, 1938–1944 (San Francisco: Westview Press, 1947), p. 125.) Finalized in early 1940 and delivered in April to Franz Halder and Walther von Brauchitsch in a concerted effort to impel the Army High Command to act, its proposed successor government nonetheless retained Hermann Göring as Reich Chancellor. For historian Hans Mommsen, this remains evidence that the conspiracy's political horizons in 1939–1940 yet remained within the bounds of conservative-nationalist ideals. Surviving in the Zossen safe until its discovery by the Gestapo on 22 September 1944, the X Report then disappeared and was almost certainly destroyed. (Note: Beck had issued explicit instructions for all copies of the X Report to be destroyed; one copy nonetheless survived in the OKH safe at Zossen, was recovered by the SD following the failure of the 20 July plot, and four photostat copies were subsequently made, two of which are known to have survived.)

Prosecutorial ambitions of the conspirators extended beyond documentation for an actual legal case for Nazi crimes alone, but also traversed the realm of Hitler’s fitness to lead. A panel of psychiatrists under the chairmanship of Professor Karl Bonhoeffer—Dietrich Bonhoeffer's father and Dohnanyi's father-in-law—conducted "a secret enquiry into the Führer's mental condition, beginning from his case history at the military hospital at Pasewalk," a copy of which Oster's office had surreptitiously obtained. The panel's report "suggested that the patient should be certified insane," and determined that there was "good evidence and a strong reason for removing Hitler from office and immuring him in a lunatic asylum."

Additionally, among the Zossen holdings were the personal diary of Admiral Canaris—meticulous records kept with the explicit intention of supporting a postwar German legal proceeding against Nazi officials—the so-called Fritsch papers, documentation related to the manufactured case against von Fritsch in 1938, and the Vatican papers arising from Müller's Rome negotiations.

== The April 1943 arrests ==
When the RSHA's arrests came in April 1943, they were not opportunistic—its officials had been accumulating what Heydrich called an "ammunition pack" against the Abwehr's conspiratorial core for years, holding secret dossiers documenting anti-regime activity by Oster and Dohnanyi in reserve until the moment seemed ripe. Dohnanyi had been on the RSHA's black list since 1938, when he had helped expose the Gestapo's manufactured case against von Fritsch, and his close ties to the Beck–Goerdeler circle were well documented. The pretext arrived in autumn 1942 via a Munich currency investigation that implicated Dohnanyi in the illegal transfer of foreign currency to Jews travelling to Switzerland; this information came to the Gestapo via pressure upon Wilhelm Schmidhuber, an Abwehr-connected exporter. Gestapo Müller turned the investigation over to the Wehrmacht while ensuring Gestapo participation through the appointment of Franz Sonderegger as observer; the Reich Military Court subsequently nominated Judge Advocate Dr. Manfred Roeder to examine the case, who as investigating officer, had previously broken the anti-Nazi resistance group, Rote Kapelle.

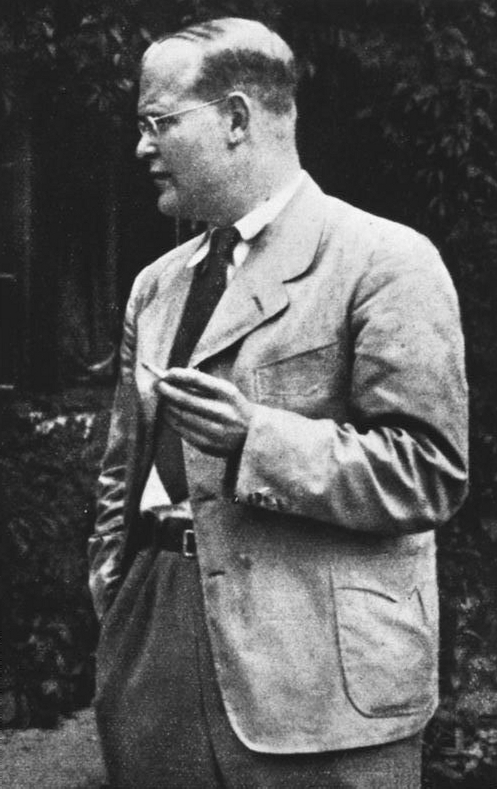
Lutheran pastor Dietrich Bonhoeffer, whose resistance activities and ecumenical contacts featured among the Zossen archive's holdings

Despite a warning from Arthur Nebe only days earlier that Gestapo Müller was planning a move, Dohnanyi was taken by surprise when Roeder appeared at Canaris's office on 5 April 1943 to initiate the investigation. During the subsequent search of Dohnanyi's safe, Dohnanyi attempted to signal to Oster that certain papers should be treated as official "intelligence" material; Oster misunderstood and instead attempted to pocket the documents, which was observed by Sonderegger, and the suspicion this aroused spread far beyond the original charges. Dohnanyi, Bonhoeffer, Dr. Josef Müller, and Bonhoeffer's sister Frau von Dohnanyi were arrested the same day; Oster was progressively sidelined and released from active service in March 1944. The papers had, however, remained in the Zossen safe—the Gestapo's suspicions, though aroused, were only gradually allayed, and it took months of messages smuggled from prison before Dohnanyi could persuade Oster to treat the compromising papers as official "intelligence material."

== Discovery and destruction ==
In the weeks following the failure of the 20 July plot to assassinate Hitler, (Note: Following the attempt on Hitler's life, brutal reprisals were meted out; meanwhile, he became all the more convinced of his "sense of walking with destiny.") the Gestapo labored to reconstruct the conspiracy's personnel and organizational structure from fragmentary evidence. Lieutenant-Colonel Werner Schrader, one of those responsible for the Zossen archive under Abwehr control, was implicated in the plot; some of the papers were allegedly buried, but Schrader committed suicide on 28 July 1944 in his quarters in Zossen before any attempt at concealment could be completed, leaving a note reading: "I will not go to prison; I will not let them torture me." From prison, Dohnanyi pressed repeatedly for the archive's destruction and his conviction that "every one of those papers was a death sentence" was amply documented in Christine von Dohnanyi's postwar account. Meanwhile, the combination of Oster's effective sidelining, Beck's illness and insistence that the documents must be preserved for historical and postwar purposes, atop the danger of traveling to Zossen after 1942, ensured that no one among the remaining conspirators would bring themselves to act.

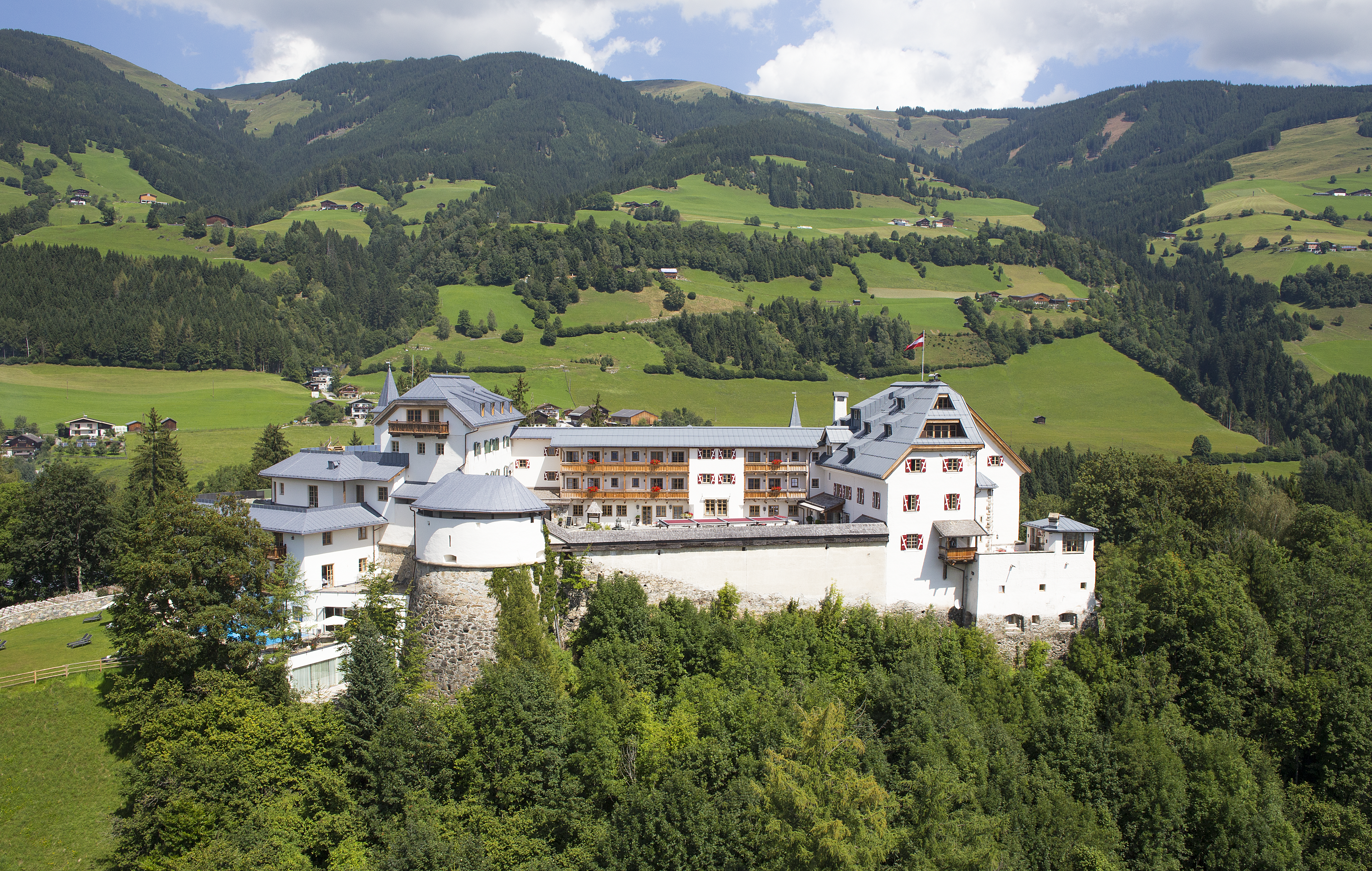
Schloss Mittersill in the Austrian Alps, where Kaltenbrunner oversaw the destruction of the Zossen documents

How the safe came to be located is contested, and it remains unclear whether it was through Schrader's driver Kerstenhahn eventually volunteering information about documents he had transported to Camp Zeppelin, or through a separate Sonderkommission team independently locating a keyless safe in the OKH complex. Either way, the safe was found and the Gestapo opened it on 22 September 1944, yielding what historian Peter Hoffmann described as "an important haul of documents" assembled by Dohnanyi, Oster, and Bonhoeffer—including details of the 1938 conspiracy preparations—yet the archive neither advanced the investigation nor served as prosecutorial evidence. To this end, the documents "did not help them beyond confirming what the investigation had already brought to light" and, if anything, served "to further implicate persons against whom there was already more than enough material to justify the death sentence, according to standards then prevailing." The most compromising content—that concerning the conspirators' 1939–40 Vatican negotiations with the British government—proved entirely unusable in court, for a reason rooted in the archive's own camouflage; namely, since matters of espionage often involve double agents, the available documentation proved impossible to "differentiate between" deceit of the enemy and what might otherwise be definable as actual treason.

Under the personal supervision of SD chief Ernst Kaltenbrunner, the documents were subsequently transported to Schloss Mittersill in the Tyrol and burned. (Note: After the documents' discovery, Kaltenbrunner triumphantly reported to Martin Bormann that definitive plans to overthrow Hitler were in existence going back to the Blomberg–Fritsch crisis of February 1938, and that Abwehr chief Wilhelm Canaris (among others) was likewise implicated in the conspiracy.) This destruction was later confirmed by SS-Standartenführer and lawyer Walter Huppenkothen, (Note: He was also the Gestapo officer who had spent three weeks in October 1944 compiling a 160-page documentation of the safe's contents, four copies of which were prepared for Hitler, Himmler, Kaltenbrunner, and Gestapo Müller.) when he testified before the Munich Court of Assize in February 1951 that the papers found in Zossen had been destroyed by the Gestapo; the proceedings were the same in which he faced trial for his role in the Flossenbürg court martial.

== The Canaris diary and the April 1945 executions ==
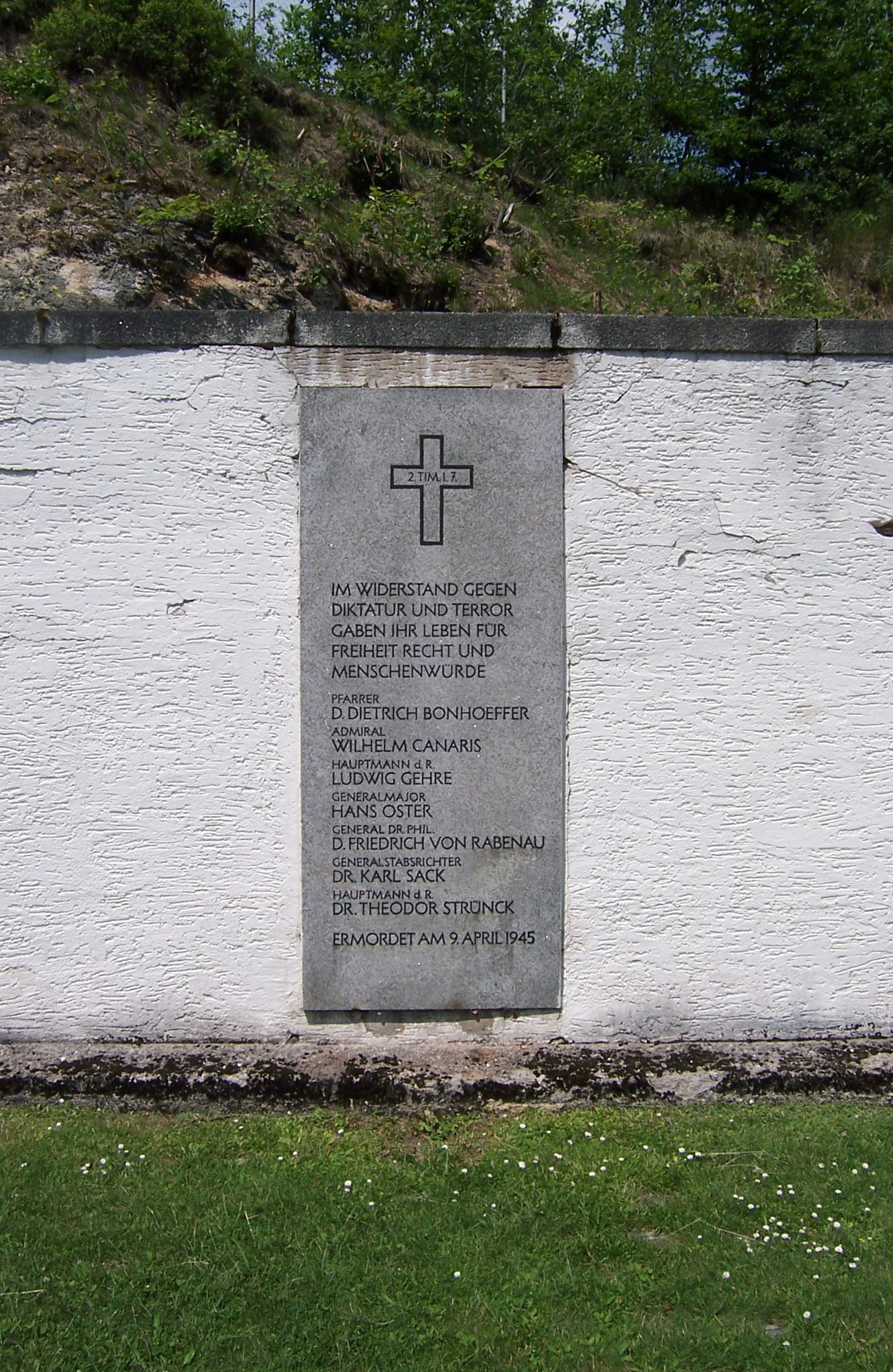
Flossenbürg concentration camp memorial plaque honoring German resistance members executed on 9 April 1945; Dohnanyi's name is notably missing, as he was brought to Flossenbürg from a police hospital in Berlin and executed separately, possibly at a different location within or near the camp complex, and the precise circumstances of his execution remain less fully documented than those of the others.

The most operationally consequential document in the archive was not among those recovered in September 1944; this was Admiral Canaris's complete diary—maintained with conspicuous thoroughness as the intended evidentiary basis for postwar German proceedings against the Nazi leadership—which remained undiscovered until April 1945. Its recovery enraged Hitler sufficiently that he ordered the execution of the entire Canaris group; in any case it had never been intended that this circle of ex-Abwehr officers would escape, and their formal trial before the People's Court had been deferred because a public airing of Abwehr operations would not have been expedient for the regime.

On 6 April, Huppenkothen stopped at Sachsenhausen concentration camp, where Dohnanyi, who with his wife's covert assistance had been confined to a police hospital for an infection, was subjected to a summary 'trial' while semi-conscious and on a stretcher; he was executed on 9 April. Huppenkothen proceeded to Flossenbürg, where a court martial was convened on Canaris, Oster, Judge Advocate Sack, Captains Gehre and Strünck, and Bonhoeffer; Canaris was severely beaten during the proceedings. On the morning of 9 April 1945—less than a month before Germany's unconditional surrender—all were hanged.

== Significance ==
The Zossen archive represented the most systematic attempt within the German military resistance to create an evidentiary record capable of sustaining legal proceedings against the Nazi regime—a project rooted, from its inception, not merely in moral opposition but in a lawyerly insistence that the regime's crimes be documented with the rigor a future tribunal would require. The burning of the archive at Mittersill means that the full contents of the Zossen safe remain unknown; what survives is largely reconstructed from the testimony of participants, Gestapo investigation reports, and the postwar statements of officials such as Huppenkothen and Sonderegger.

Huppenkothen's postwar testimony—the most detailed surviving inventory of the safe's contents—identified thirteen categories of material, all dating from 1938–1940: Gisevius's Prussian Interior Ministry files; two folders on the Blomberg–Fritsch crisis with Oster and Dohnanyi's assessments of the Wehrmacht's obligations and first coup deliberations; Beck's defeatist memoranda on the post-Polish campaign situation, including his Mittwochsgesellschaft lecture manuscript; Oster's three-page handwritten Studie, which detailed the coup's execution plan and named Schulenburg, Gisevius, Nebe, Witzleben, Olbricht, Hoeppner, Schacht, Goerdeler, and Helldorf, whose resemblance to the 20 July plan Huppenkothen explicitly noted; typescripts on coup mechanics and the necessity of taking Hitler alive for a psychiatric examination; proclamation drafts with handwritten corrections by Oster, Dohnanyi, and Beck; the Vatican folder containing Dohnanyi's summary of Josef Müller's negotiations with the Jesuit priest Robert Leiber, together with Leiber's handwritten notes; Canaris's diary entries about a coup from autumn 1939 to spring 1940; Beck's notes on his January 1940 attempts to get Halder to act; Dohnanyi's memoranda on coup variants including his so-called 'Kerenski solution'; and intercepted records of Hitler's and Ribbentrop's conversations with foreign diplomats. Sonderegger's supplementary inventory added a letter between Halder and Goerdeler, Goerdeler's programme Das Ziel, Freiburg Circle materials, and records of Oster and Groscurth's western front mission—claims subjected to critical scrutiny by attorney/historian Elisabeth Chowaniec, who argues that several items on Sonderegger's supplementary list are chronologically incompatible with the rest of the archive's known contents.

In many ways, the Zossen documents constitute a chapter of lost opportunity, perhaps lost even before their entire scope was revealed; to this end, the late British historian John Wheeler-Bennett claimed that the April 1943 arrests of Bonhoeffer, Müller, and Dohnanyi, together with the effective sidelining of Oster, more or less represented "the end of the original conspiracy against Hitler, which had begun at the time of the Fritsch Crisis and had been based entirely on Oster's activities and his co-operation with von Dohnanyi." That the documents ultimately served the opposite function—as the proximate instrument of their compilers' destruction rather than that of the regime—is among the more consequential ironies of the resistance's fate; Wheeler-Bennett adds that "something intangible" was lost at that moment and was never truly replaced, even by the later "fanatical zeal of Claus von Stauffenberg."

== See also ==
- 20 July plot
- Hans von Dohnanyi
- Hans Oster
- Wilhelm Canaris
- Abwehr
- Flossenbürg concentration camp
- Mittersill Castle

== Bibliography ==
- Black, Peter R. (1984). Ernst Kaltenbrunner: Ideological Soldier of the Third Reich. Princeton University Press. ISBN 0-691-05397-9.
- Chang, Mary Gloria (2009). "The Vatican and the German Resistance during World War II: 1939–1940". Catholic Social Science Review. 14: 385–406. ISSN 1091-0905.
- Chowaniec, Elisabeth (1991). Der „Fall Dohnanyi" 1943–1945: Widerstand, Militärjustiz, SS-Willkür. Schriftenreihe der Vierteljahrshefte für Zeitgeschichte (in German). Vol. 62. Munich: R. Oldenbourg. ISBN 978-3-48664-562-0.
- Delarue, Jacques (2008). The Gestapo: A History of Horror. New York: Skyhorse. ISBN 978-1-60239-246-5.
- Dulles, Allen (2000) [1947]. Germany's Underground: The Anti-Nazi Resistance. New York: Da Capo Press. ISBN 978-0-30680-928-6.
- Hoffmann, Peter (1970). "Opposition Annihilated: Punishing the 1944 Plot against Hitler". The North American Review. 255 (3): 11–36. JSTOR 25117112.
- Hoffmann, Peter (1977). The History of the German Resistance, 1933–1945. Cambridge, MA: MIT Press. ISBN 978-0-26208-088-0.
- Höhne, Heinz (2001) [1969]. The Order of the Death’s Head: The Story of Hitler’s SS. New York: Penguin Press. ISBN 978-0-14139-012-3.
- Kershaw, Ian (2000). Hitler: 1936–1945, Nemesis. New York: W. W. Norton & Company. ISBN 978-0-39304-994-7.
- Mommsen, Hans (2003). Alternatives to Hitler: German Resistance Under the Third Reich. London: I.B. Tauris. ISBN 1-86064-745-6.
- Rothfels, Hans (1970). The German Opposition to Hitler: An Assessment. London: Oswald Wolff. ISBN 978-0-85496-119-1.
- Wheeler-Bennett, John W. (1980) [1953]. Nemesis of Power: The German Army in Politics 1918–1945. Basingstoke: Palgrave Macmillan. ISBN 0-333-06864-5.
