= Walter Huppenkothen =

German lawyer and Nazi intelligence officer (1907–1978)

- Born: 31 December 1907
- Died: 5 April 1978 (aged 70)
- Education: Opladen Gymnasium, University of Cologne, University of Düsseldorf
- Political party: Nazi Party (NSDAP)

Walter Huppenkothen (31 December 1907 in Haan, Rhineland – 5 April 1978 in Lübeck) was a German lawyer, Sicherheitsdienst (SD) leader, and Schutzstaffel (SS) prosecutor in the SS Court Main Office (Hauptamt SS-Gericht). He is best known for leading the Gestapo investigation that followed the September 1944 discovery of the Zossen documents, which implicated Admiral Wilhelm Canaris, General Hans Oster, Hans von Dohnanyi, and Dietrich Bonhoeffer in the broader conspiracy against Adolf Hitler, and for presiding as prosecutor over the SS drumhead court-martial at Flossenbürg concentration camp on 8 April 1945 that condemned them to death. After the war, he worked for the Counterintelligence Corps of the US Army until 1949 on account of his expertise on Communist networks, before being tried for his wartime conduct in proceedings that became a notable case study in the early Federal Republic's reluctance to hold the Nazi judicial apparatus criminally accountable.

== Early life and career ==
Huppenkothen was born attended school in Opladen and studied Law and Political Science at the University of Cologne and University of Düsseldorf and then qualified as a lawyer. On 1 May 1933, he joined the Nazi Party and the Allgemeine SS. Unable to find employment in government service he joined the Sicherheitsdienst (SD) (the intelligence service of the SS) in Düsseldorf. He also served for a brief time as head of State Police and as an SD Chief in the East Prussian-town of Tilsit (now Sovetsk, Russia), and was replaced in both positions by Dr. Heinz Gräfe. In 1937, Huppenkothen was also Gestapo chief for the regional office at Lüneburg.

== World War II ==
=== Role in the Holocaust ===
Following the 1939 German invasion of Poland, Huppenkothen was involved in the Holocaust across various areas of occupied Poland (part of the Nazi-controlled General Government). He worked as a liaison with the SS Einsatzgruppen during his time as part of the Gestapo, as well as an SD Chief in Kraków and as head of the Gestapo in Lublin in February 1940. During the invasion of Czechoslovakia in 1939, Huppenkothen was a deputy leader of an Einsatgruppe dispatched there. These were Special Task Groups of the Nazi Security Police and Security Service, with origins in the ad hoc units Reinhard Heydrich formed following the Anschluss in March 1938; similar formations were subsequently deployed in the Sudetenland during the German annexation of Czechoslovakia later that year, among them an Einsatzkommando unit led by Erwin Schulz. Heydrich later invoked this formative experience directly, telling the assembled Einsatzgruppen leaders before the 1941 invasion of the Soviet Union that their impending work would resemble what these same security formations had already carried out in Austria, Czechoslovakia, and Poland.

After Bruno Streckenbach, head of Einsatzgruppe 1 was appointed to the Reich Security Main Office (RSHA) in Berlin during 1940, Huppenkothen was placed in charge of the RSHA's Counterespionage Group (IV E). Aside from his role in the arrests and prosecution of persons within the German resistance, Huppenkothen was among the Gestapo team members responsible for rooting out operatives in the Communist Red Orchestra.

=== Prosecutions ===
Thereafter, as an SS-Standartenführer (Colonel) Huppenkothen was appointed the prosecutor of the SS and police court in Munich. Following the failure of the 20 July plot to assassinate Adolf Hitler, Huppenkothen headed the Gestapo's post-plot special commission and compiled the 160-page documentation of the Zossen archive's contents in October 1944 for Hitler, Heinrich Himmler, Ernst Kaltenbrunner, and Gestapo chief Heinrich Müller. (Note: Huppenkothen's postwar testimony before the Munich Court of Assize constitutes the most detailed surviving account of what the Zossen documents contained. According to Huppenkothen, there were some 10,000 pages worth of material between the Zossen files and the Canaris diary lost to posterity, a veritable treasure trove of missing content.)

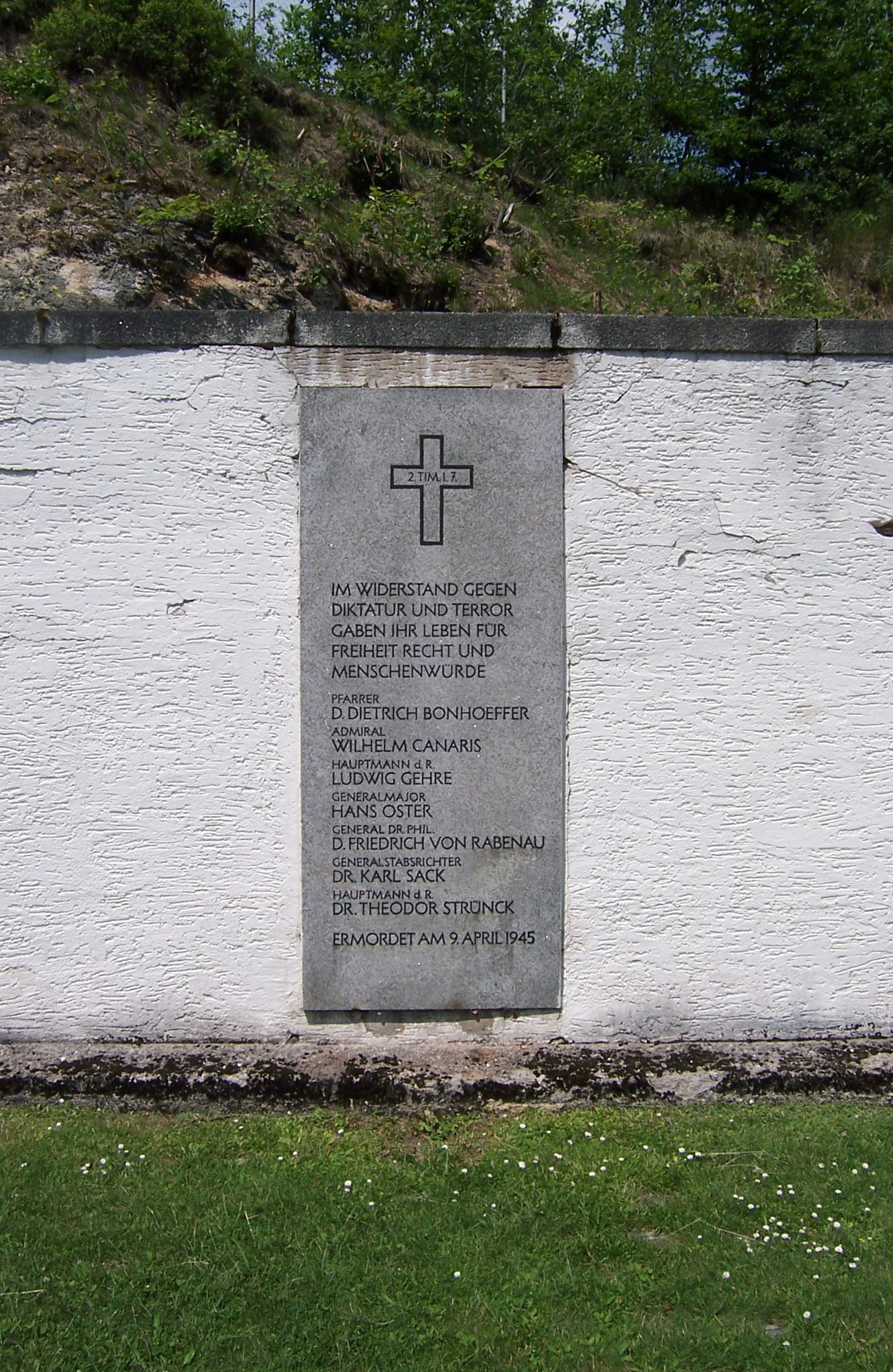
Memorial to members of the German resistance prosecuted by Walter Huppenkothen

On 6 April 1945, Huppenkothen prosecuted Hans von Dohnanyi in Sachsenhausen concentration camp, while the defendant lay semi-conscious on a stretcher having contracted a serious infection and the proceedings ended with him being condemned to death by SS judge Otto Thorbeck. Acting under orders from Kaltenbrunner, he then proceeded to Flossenbürg concentration camp, where on 8 April a drumhead court-martial was convened without witnesses, written records, or defense counsel. It was presided over by Otto Thorbeck. Among the condemned were Lutheran clergyman Dietrich Bonhoeffer, General Hans Oster, Army Chief Judge Dr. Karl Sack, Captain Ludwig Gehre and former head of the Abwehr Admiral Wilhelm Canaris, all of whom had been implicated in conspiracies against the Nazi regime and in the plots to kill or overthrow Hitler.

The court's prosecution employed torture methods such as thumb screwing and mechanical stretching devices on the accused, who were subsequently sentenced to death after a brief trial and executed by hanging on 9 April 1945, roughly a month before Germany's military defeat and unconditional surrender and only around two weeks before the camp's liberation. Otto Thorbeck later testified that the conspiracy trials lasted three hours under Huppenkothen's direction and that he shouted accusations at them, then permitted a brief answer period before the death sentence was imposed. A commemorative plaque for the executed prisoners, as well as a statue of Bonhoeffer, exists at the former location of the camp, now a memorial site.

Beyond his role at the drumhead court-martials themselves, testimony from RSHA detainee Fabian von Schlabrendorff—held in the agency's Berlin detention facility from August 1944 to early April 1945—described being beaten and subjected to spiked restraint devices during interrogation. Huppenkothen was held responsible for this mistreatment on the grounds that, even where he had not personally ordered it in every instance, it had come to his knowledge and received his tacit approval; as a man on first-name terms with Himmler, he was held to have been in a position to prevent or halt the abuse.

== Post-war ==
=== Collaboration with US military ===
Huppenkothen was captured at Gmunden on 26 April 1945. After the war ended in Europe, Huppenkothen was interned by the Americans and worked for the Counterintelligence Corps of the US Army until January 1949. The Army's counterintelligence division took a particular interest in Huppenkothen's knowledge of Communism, their networks and his work as a Gestapo official in searching for members of the Communist resistance and espionage group, the Red Orchestra.

=== Trials and testimonies ===
Charges were brought against Huppenkothen in autumn 1949 before the Munich Regional Court I, covering three counts of coerced testimony—against Dohnanyi, Hans Koch, and Karl Ludwig von Guttenberg—and six counts of accessory to murder arising from his conduct as prosecutor at Sachsenhausen and Flossenbürg.

The resulting proceedings against Huppenkothen and Thorbeck, examined by legal historian Miriam Wolf in a 2021 monograph, ran from the opening investigation to final legal force across six judgments issued between 1949 and 1956. The Munich Regional Court I first acquitted Huppenkothen of the accessory-to-murder charges, accepting that the drumhead court-martials, however summary, constituted legally valid proceedings at the time; the Bundesgerichtshof (BGH) vacated this acquittal and remanded the case, whereupon the Munich court again acquitted him on the same charges. Following a second prosecution appeal, the BGH remanded the case to the Augsburg Regional Court, which convicted both Huppenkothen and Thorbeck of accessory to murder; on the defendants' appeal, the BGH let the murder conviction stand only with respect to Huppenkothen's conduct at Flossenbürg, acquitting both men of all remaining charges. Huppenkothen's sentence was subsequently reduced by way of pardon, and he was released from custody on probation by order of the Augsburg Regional Court on 7 February 1959.

The acquittal on the murder charges drew immediate and sustained criticism as to the court's reasoning that even though the court martial proceedings were conducted without witnesses, records, or defense counsel, nonetheless they constituted legally valid judicial acts whose outcomes could not be imputed as murder to the participants. It was widely characterized as a paradigmatic instance of the early Federal Republic's reluctance to hold the Nazi judicial apparatus criminally accountable. Legal historian Hubert Seliger has noted that the judgments were shaped by treason-inflected language that implicitly legitimized the wartime proceedings—a framing reinforced by the appointment of former Wehrmacht jurists as the rapporteurs responsible for drafting the written judgments.

In May 1961 Huppenkothen subsequently testified at the Adolf Eichmann trial in Jerusalem, though his family reported that he was reluctant to do so.

== Bibliography ==
- Allied Powers (1945). "Act of Military Surrender". Avalon Project, Yale Law School.
- Bigart, Homer (9 May 1961). "Huppenkothen Reluctant". The New York Times.
- Birn, Ruth (June 2011). "Fifty Years After: A Critical Look at the Eichmann Trial". Case Western Reserve Journal of International Law. 1/2: 443–469.
- Breitman, Richard; Goda, Norman J.W.; Naftali, Timothy; Wolfe, Robert (2005). U.S. Intelligence and the Nazis. Cambridge: Cambridge University Press. ISBN 978-0-52161-794-9.
- Chowaniec, Elisabeth (1991). Der „Fall Dohnanyi" 1943–1945: Widerstand, Militärjustiz, SS-Willkür. Schriftenreihe der Vierteljahrshefte für Zeitgeschichte (in German). Vol. 62. Munich: R. Oldenbourg. ISBN 978-3-48664-562-0.
- Deutsch, Harold C. (1981). "The German Resistance: Answered and Unanswered Questions". Central European History. 14 (4): 322–331.
- Evans, Richard (2010). The Third Reich at War. New York: Penguin. ISBN 978-0-14311-671-4.
- Hoffmann, Peter (1977). The History of the German Resistance, 1933–1945. Cambridge, MA: MIT Press. ISBN 978-0-26208-088-0.
- Klee, Ernst (2016). Personenlexikon zum Dritten Reich: Wer war was vor und nach 1945 (in German). Hamburg: Nikol Verlag. ISBN 978-3-86820-311-0.
- Ledford, Kenneth F. (2013). "Judging German Judges in the Third Reich: Excusing and Confronting the Past". In Alan E. Steinweis; Robert D. Rachlin (eds.). The Law in Nazi Germany: Ideology, Opportunism, and the Perversion of Justice. New York: Berghahn Books. pp. 161–190. ISBN 978-0-85745-780-6.
- Munzinger.de (2026). "Walter Huppenkothen". Munzinger.de.
- Nelson, Anne (2009). Red Orchestra: The Story of the Berlin Underground and the Circle of Friends Who Resisted Hitler. Random House Publishing Group. ISBN 978-1-58836-799-0.
- Purucker, Erwin (2026). "Flossenbürg - KZ-Gedenkstätte". www.fotos-reiseberichte.de.
- Rhodes, Richard (2002). Masters of Death: The SS-Einsatzgruppen and the Invention of the Holocaust. New York: Alfred A. Knopf. ISBN 0-37540-900-9.
- Seliger, Hubert (2016). "Der Prozess gegen Walter Huppenkothen und Otto Thorbeck, Deutschland 1949–1956". Lexikon der Politischen Strafprozesse (in German).
- Time (26 February 1951). "Hitler's Advocate". Time.
- USHMM. "Trial of Nazi SS Prosecutor in 1950s". United States Holocaust Memorial Museum—Steven Spielberg Film and Video Archive.
- Wildt, Michael (2009). An Uncompromising Generation: The Nazi Leadership in the Reich Main Security Office. University of Wisconsin Press. ISBN 978-0-29923-464-5.
- Wolf, Miriam (2021). Das Verfahren gegen Walter Huppenkothen und Otto Thorbeck: Die gescheiterte Aufarbeitung der Ermordung der Widerstandskämpfer um Dietrich Bonhoeffer und Wilhelm Canaris durch die westdeutsche Nachkriegsjustiz. Quellen und Forschungen zur Strafrechtsgeschichte (in German). Vol. 15. Berlin: Erich Schmidt Verlag. ISBN 978-3-50320-028-3.
