= Rudolf von Marogna-Redwitz =

German Wehrmacht officer (1886–1944)

Rudolf Graf von Marogna-Redwitz (15 October 1886 – 12 October 1944) was a Colonel of the Wehrmacht, member of the German Resistance in Nazi Germany and hanged after the 20 July plot against Adolf Hitler at the Wolf's Lair in East Prussia.

== Early life ==
Born in Munich, Rudolf Graf von Marogna-Redwitz completed his training to be a career officer in the German Imperial Army. He worked initially in a successor organization to military counterintelligence after the First World War. In the 1920s he became acquainted with Claus Schenk von Stauffenberg at the Reichswehr Reiterregiment 17 in Bamberg.

== Second World War ==
In 1935, he was transferred to the Abwehr of Wilhelm Canaris and was sent to Vienna in 1938, where he served as the Chief of the counterintelligence office aka Abwehr department Vienna. Marogna-Redwitz cooperated with the catholic-conservative parts of resistance in Austria. After Canaris was disbanded out of office in early 1944, Marogna-Redwitz was transferred to the Army High Command in Berlin at the instigation of Friedrich Olbricht.

Among those who worked for him was Lieutenant Colonel Werner Schrader.

Marogna-Redwitz belonged to the tight circle with the brothers Claus Graf Schenk von Stauffenberg and Berthold Graf Schenk von Stauffenberg and was scheduled as the plotter's liaison officer in Vienna.

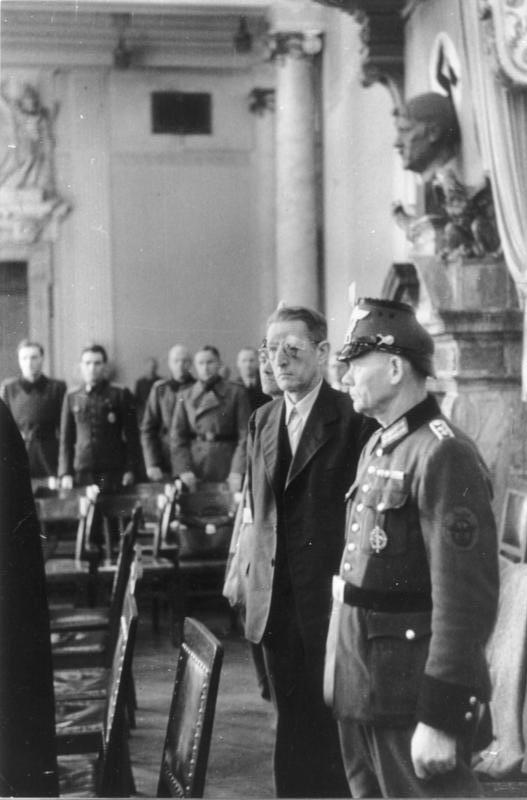
Marogna-Redwitz at the Volksgerichtshof

=== 20 July plot ===
On 20 July 1944, while in Vienna, he contacted the Austrian Politicians Karl Seitz and Josef Reither and took action against local Nazis but was soon arrested by the Gestapo, he was sentenced to death by the Volksgerichtshof or the People's Court on 12 October 1944 and hanged at Plötzensee Prison in Berlin the same day.

== Personal life ==
Marogna-Redwitz and wife Anna Gräfin von Arco-Zinneberg had one daughter and two sons.
