= Theodor Strünck =

German lawyer and resistance member

Theodor Strünck

Theodor Strünck (7 April 1895, Kiel-Pries - 9 April 1945, Flossenbürg concentration camp) was a German lawyer and resistance worker, involved in the 20 July plot.

== Life ==
Theodor Strünck studied legal science, graduating at the University of Rostock in 1924, and became a lawyer (later a director) at an insurance company. Initially sympathising with nationalism, he then turned to opposing the regime on their seizure of power and the subsequent decline in the rule of law. In 1937 he became a captain in Germany's reserve forces, working in the Wehrmacht section of the Amt Ausland/Abwehr under Hans Oster. He came into contact with Carl Goerdeler and organised meetings of German Resistance members in his own home. Strünck also acted as a courier for the group. He delivered information from the conspirators in Berlin to Hans Bernd Gisevius in Zürich who was in contact with Allen Dulles, the Swiss director of the Office of Strategic Services.

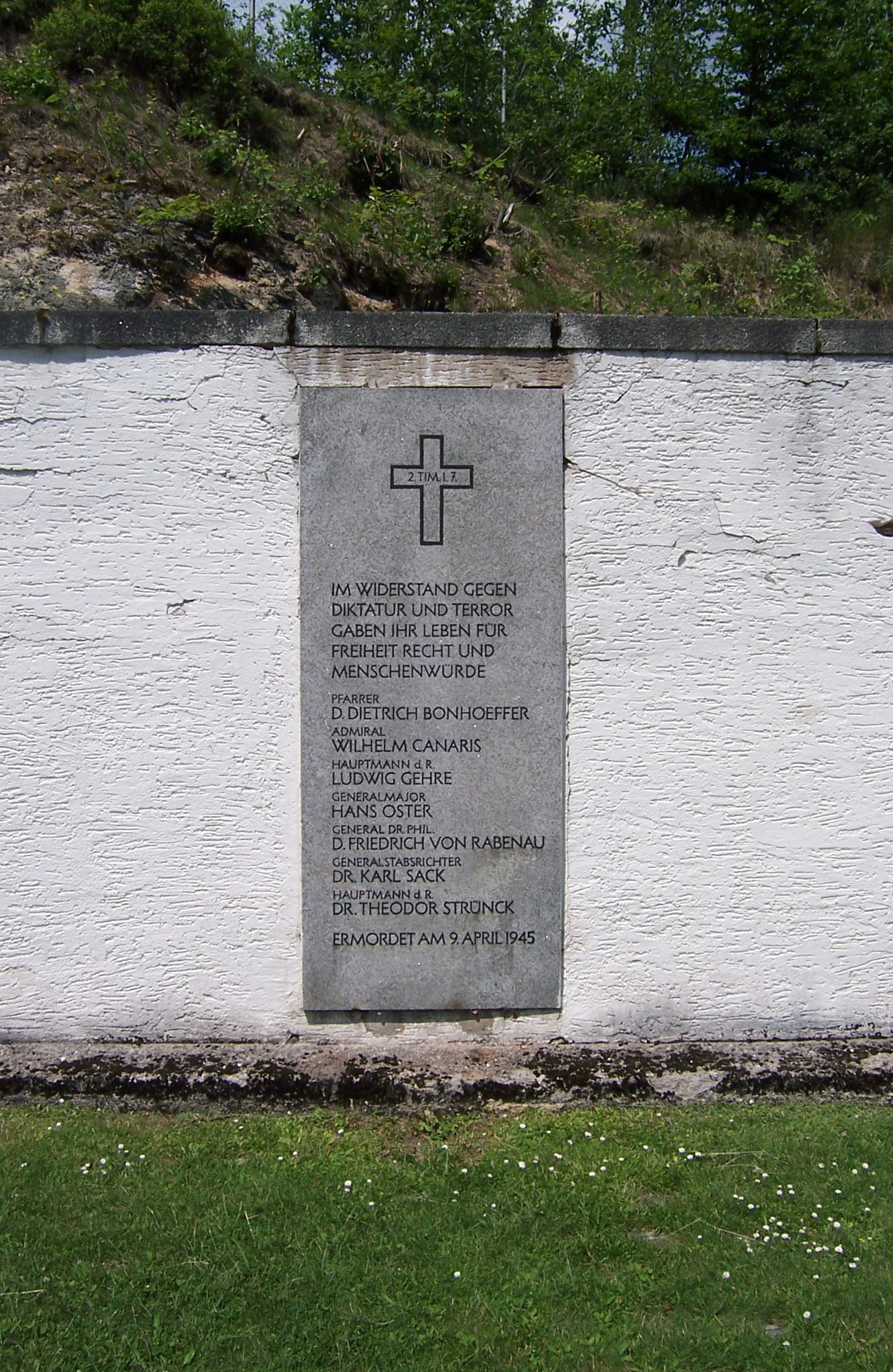
Memorial in Flossenbürg.

For his participation in the 20 July 1944 plot, Theodor Strünck was arrested on 1 August, dishonourably discharged from the army on 24 August as part of the "Ehrenhof" (so that the Reichskriegsgericht or Reich Courts Martial would no longer have control of his sentencing), and on 10 October condemned to death by the People's Court under its president Roland Freisler. He was then imprisoned in Flossenbürg concentration camp, where he, Dietrich Bonhoeffer, Wilhelm Canaris, Ludwig Gehre, Hans Oster and Karl Sack were executed together by hanging on 9 April 1945.

== Sources ==
- Hoffmann, Peter (2008). Stauffenberg: A Family History, 1905-1944. McGill-Queen’s University Press.
- Klemperer, Klemens von (1994). German Resistance against Hitler: The Search for Allies Abroad 1938–1945. Clarendon Paperbacks.
- Steinbach, Peter; Tuchel, Johannes, eds. (1998). Lexikon Des Widerstandes 1933 - 1945. Beck. ISBN 340643861X.
- Tietz, Christiane (2016). Theologian of Resistance : The Life and Thought of Dietrich Bonhoeffer. Translated by Victoria Barnett. Minneapolis, MN: Fortress Press.
- Von Hassell, Agostino; von Hoyningen-Huene MacRae, Sigrid; Ameskamp, Simone (2008). Alliance of Enemies: The Untold Story of the Secret American and German Collaboration to End World War II. New York: Thomas Dunne Books/St. Martin’s Griffin.
