= Werner Schrader =

German military officer and resistance member (1895–1944)

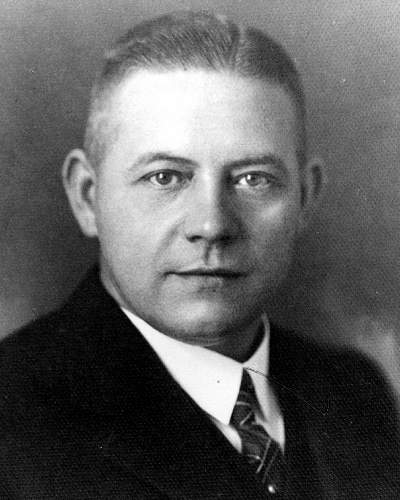
Schrader

Werner Schrader (born 7 March 1895 in Rottorf (today part of Königslutter), Germany; died 28 July 1944 in Zossen) was a German military officer involved in several plots by the German Resistance including the famous 20 July plot, a coup d'état attempting to assassinate Adolf Hitler.

== Early life ==
In 1914 Schrader graduated as teacher and enlisted voluntarily in the German Army where he served throughout World War I. Demobilized in 1920 with the rank of Oberleutnant (first lieutenant) he worked as teacher. From 1924 to 1927 he taught History and German at a school in Wolfenbüttel.

At approximately the same time, Schrader became a member of Der Stahlhelm (English: The Steel helmet), a veterans organisation after the First World War. There he rose to the rank of regional leader for Braunschweig. After the Nazi takeover of power in Weimar Germany he vehemently opposed aligning the Stahlhelm with Hitler’s storm troops, eventually losing both his leadership position in the institution and his teaching post.

An action which clearly led to his downfall occurred in October 1931. That month Werner von Schrader attended the Harzburg Congress; in the presence of the up-and-coming Adolf Hitler, he denounced the excesses of the SA or Storm Troopers. Thus after Adolf Hitler came to power in January 1933, the unsuccessful so-called "Stahlhelm Putsch" occurred on 27 March 1933 in Braunschweig and Schrader was removed from school service and imprisoned.

== Nazi Germany and the Second World War ==
In 1936, with re-arrest possible, he was personally recruited into the German military intelligence service or Abwehr by Admiral Wilhelm Canaris as Captain. He was stationed first to Munich, then to Vienna, then back to Germany to the army headquarters at Zossen, where he was promoted to Oberstleutnant (Lieutenant Colonel). While in Munich, he met fellow resister Rudolf von Marogna-Redwitz; while in Vienna, he began to collect documentary evidence of Nazi crimes.

After the invasion of Poland in September 1939, Werner Schrader was transferred to German Army High Command Headquarters where he put together a secret archive - complete with reports and photographs - of SS atrocities in Poland. Wilhelm Canaris had successfully lobbied for an Abwehr presence at Army High Command Headquarters at Zossen. The small four-man sub-unit called the Special Duties Section was completely staffed by anti-Nazis - including Werner Schrader. He left the small section in September 1940 for a posting in Vienna but returned to Zossen and the Special Duties Section in 1941 where he would remain for the rest of his life. During the 1939 to 1944 period, Schrader had acted as the main custodian of various resistance-related files and documents, becoming one of the archivists to the German resistance. In 1944, he also took on the responsibility of the detailed documents put together by Hans von Dohnanyi and Hans Oster. He particularly took care of the personal diary of his boss Admiral Canaris, chief of Abwehr and head of the German resistance movement against Hitler.

== 20 July Bomb Plot ==
Werner Schrader was involved in the procurement and handling of explosives for the 20 July conspiracy. In June 1944, Oberst Wessel von Freytag-Loringhoven became Chief of Abwehr II. By the end of June 1944, Werner von Schrader had provided him with explosives and with fuses; these were passed on to Claus von Stauffenberg. At the same time due to his placement in the military secret service, he was in charge of investigations into finds of similar explosives. He had managed to sabotage these investigations. In early July 1944, Schrader met with Canaris and briefed him on what he knew of Claus von Stauffenberg's intended plot. After the assassination attempt on 20 July 1944 had failed, Schrader ended his life on 28 July 1944. He left a note saying “I will not go to prison; I will not let them torture me...”.

The Zossen-based copy of Canaris' diary was discovered on 4 April 1945 by the pro-Hitler General Walther Buhle and other important resistance documents were also discovered by the Gestapo after Schrader's suicide. As one of those responsible for the physical security of the Zossen archive following Dohnanyi's arrest in April 1943, Schrader's death left the archive without its custodian and contributed to the circumstances that allowed the Gestapo to locate and open the Zossen safe on 22 September 1944. As a result, the Canaris group was executed on 9 April 1945 at Flossenburg and Sachsenhausen concentration camps. Schrader's wife Cornelia and his son Werner Wolf were arrested.
