= Otto Thorbeck =

German lawyer and Nazi SS judge

Otto Thorbeck (26 August 1912 – 10 October 1976) was a German lawyer and Nazi SS judge in the Hauptamt SS-Gericht.

Thorbeck was born in Brieg, Silesia.

In 1941, Sturmbannführer (Major) Thorbeck was appointed the chief judge of the SS and police court in Munich for which SS Standartenführer (Colonel) Walter Huppenkothen was the prosecutor. On 8 April 1945, under orders from Ernst Kaltenbrunner, he presided over a drumhead court-martial without witnesses, records of proceedings or a defence in Flossenbürg concentration camp, that condemned Lutheran pastor Dietrich Bonhoeffer, General Hans Oster, Army chief judge Karl Sack, Captain Ludwig Gehre, and Admiral Wilhelm Canaris to death. They were all hanged on 9 April, two weeks before the United States Army liberated the camp.

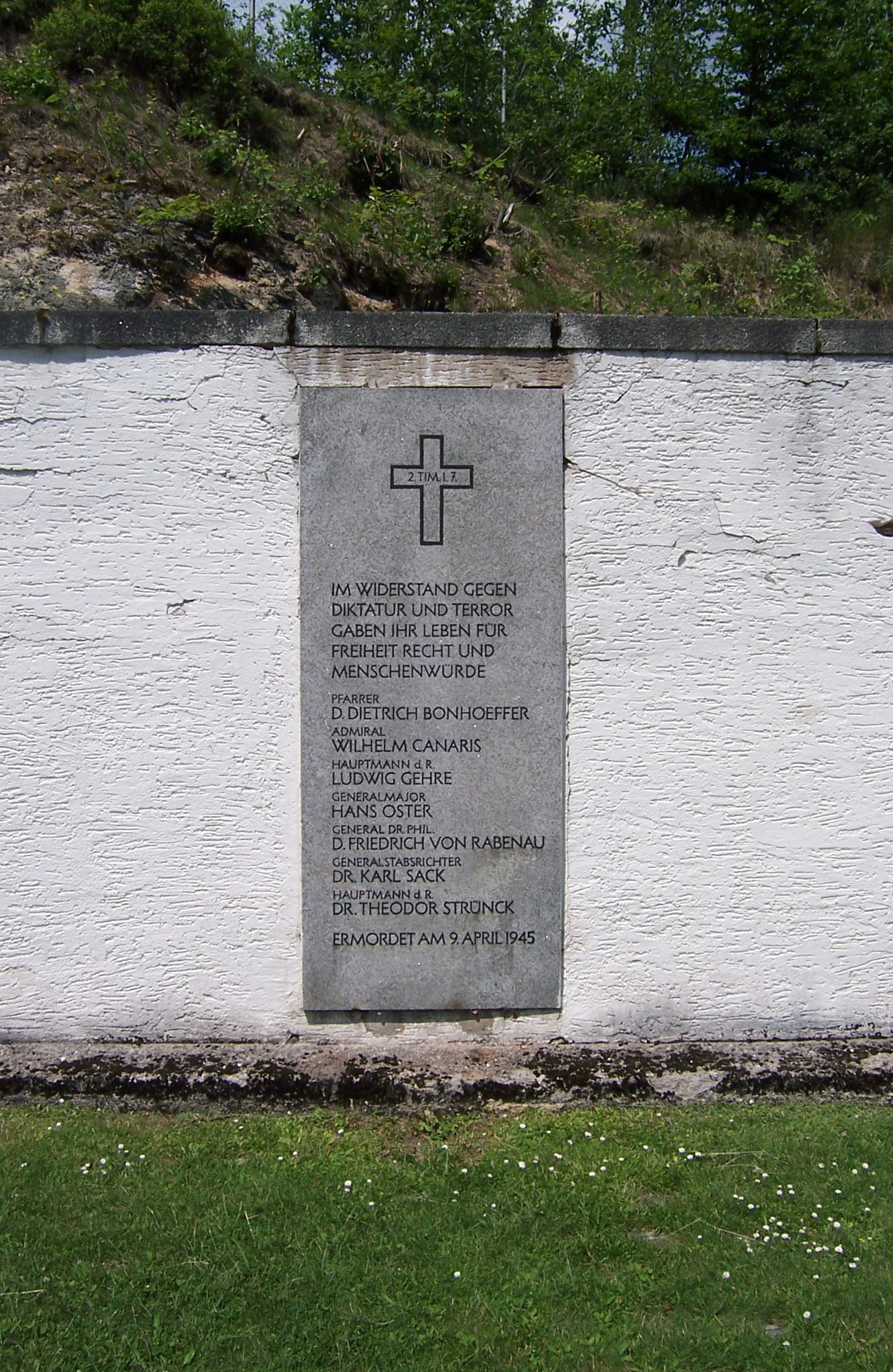
Memorial to members of the German resistance condemned to death by Otto Thorbeck

After the war, Thorbeck was interned until April 1948. He then worked as an attorney in Nuremberg. In 1955, he was convicted by a court of assizes in Augsburg for assisting in murder and sentenced to four years' imprisonment. On 19 June 1956, the Federal Court of Justice of Germany exonerated him on grounds that the killings were legal because the Nazi regime had the right to execute traitors. He died in Nuremberg in 1976.
