= Erwin von Lahousen =

German general (1897–1955)

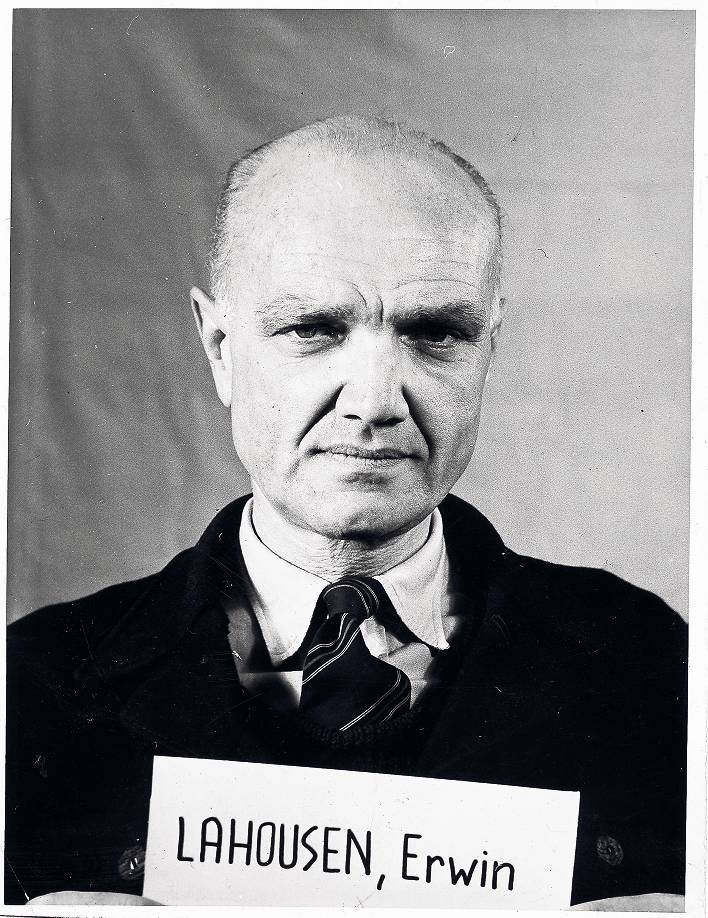
- Born: 25 October 1897
- Died: 24 February 1955 (aged 57); Innsbruck, Allied-occupied Austria
- Military career
- Allegiance: Austro-Hungarian Army; Wehrmacht
- Branch: Abwehr
- Service years: 1915-1945
- Rank: Generalmajor
- Awards: Military Merit Cross; Karl Troop Cross; German Cross; Iron Cross

Erwin Heinrich René Lahousen, Edler von Vivremont (25 October 1897 – 24 February 1955) was a German military office who was a high-ranking Abwehr official during the Second World War, as well as a member of the German Resistance and a key player in attempts to assassinate Adolf Hitler on 13 March 1943 and 20 July 1944.

== Background ==
An Austrian from an aristocratic family, Lahousen served in the Austro-Hungarian Army during the First World War. After the war, he became a member of Austrian counterintelligence. However, after the Anschluss in 1938, Austria's intelligence services were absorbed into Germany's, and Lahousen joined the Abwehr, headed by Admiral Wilhelm Canaris.

== Second World War ==
Lahousen and Canaris took well to each other, as both shared anti-Nazi feelings. Lahousen became a member of a circle of hand-picked officers opposed to Hitler who ran the intelligence agency. Canaris appointed him chief of Abwehr section II, which dealt primarily with the Brandenburgers and sabotage.

Lahousen handled the successful sabotage aspects of the invasion of Poland in September 1939. But because Canaris did not give as much a priority to sabotage as to espionage, Lahousen ordered that agents destined for Britain be trained primarily for spying, with disastrous results. Saboteurs who landed in the United States during Operation Pastorius in June 1942 were betrayed to the FBI by one of their number, arrested, tried by military tribunal, and executed.

In 1943, Lahousen was sent to the Eastern Front and thus escaped the final days of the Abwehr, which, along with Canaris, had fallen into disfavour. Lahousen later claimed that he was the one who supplied the bomb used on the Smolensk plot (Operation Spark, 13 March 1943). The assassination attempt carried out by Fabian von Schlabrendorff failed.

After the failure of the assassination attempt and putsch (20 July plot), Claus von Stauffenberg and thousands of other accused plotters, including Canaris, were executed. Due to his service at the front, Lahousen escaped notice. On 19 July 1944 Lahousen was heavily wounded by an artillery hit.

== Nuremberg trial ==
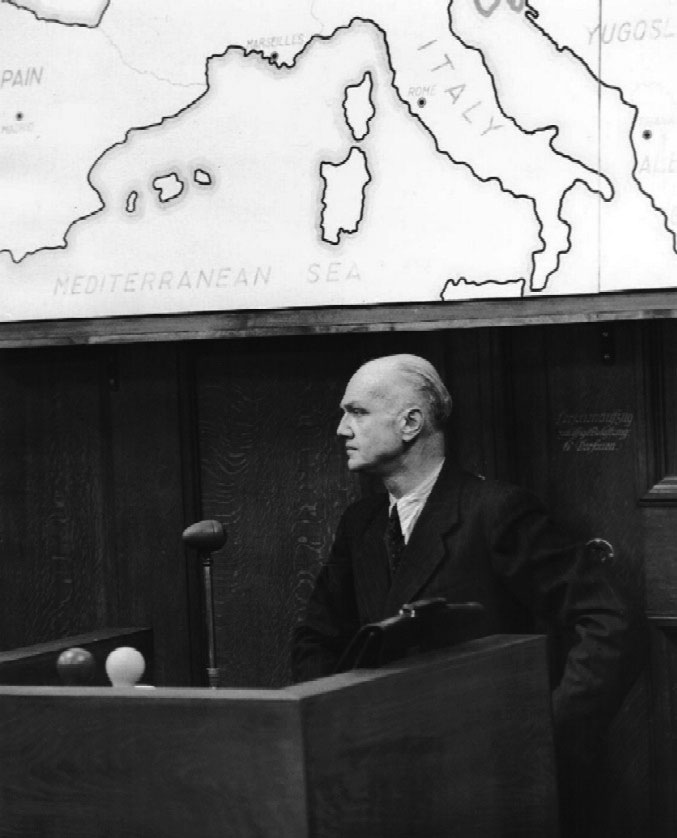
General Erwin Lahousen testifying against Hermann Göring and 21 other Nazi defendants at the Nuremberg War Crimes Trials in 1946

After the end of the war, Lahousen voluntarily testified against Hermann Göring and 21 other defendants at the Nuremberg war crimes trials in 1945–1946. Lahousen was the first witness for the prosecution, his prominence due to being the sole survivor of the 'Abwehr resistance'. Among other things, he gave evidence about the murder of hundreds of thousands of Soviet prisoners of war and the Einsatzgruppen death squads, who murdered more than a million Jews in the conquered areas of the Soviet Union, Poland and Ukraine.

== See also ==
- List of Germans who resisted Nazism
- Schwarze Kapelle
