= Ludwig Gehre =

German soldier (1895–1945)

Ludwig Gehre

Ludwig Gehre (5 October 1895 – 9 April 1945) was an officer and resistance fighter involved in the preparation of an assassination attempt against Adolf Hitler.

== Life ==
Gehre was born in Düsseldorf, Germany. He joined the Nazi Party in 1920. Minimal details are known of his early years in the parental home, or the education he received. The first reference to Gehre appears when he was a managing director of a building contractor. In 1928, he published a study on Clausewitz; by that time he is supposed to have begun his career as an officer in the Reichswehr.

== Contact man with the conspirators ==
At the beginning of the Second World War, Gehre was a captain in the German Army intelligence service, the Abwehr. He was an active member of a group, formed originally in the Abwehr, that had formed to remove the Nazi regime and end the war. This circle included Admiral Wilhelm Canaris, General Ludwig Beck, Hans von Dohnanyi, Hans Oster and Dietrich Bonhoeffer, as well as Gehre.

By March 1943, Gehre was privy to the preparations under Henning von Tresckow to assassinate Hitler. In January 1944, Helmuth James Graf von Moltke was arrested, and in March 1944 Gehre was also taken by the Gestapo. Gehre, however, was soon able to flee and disappeared.

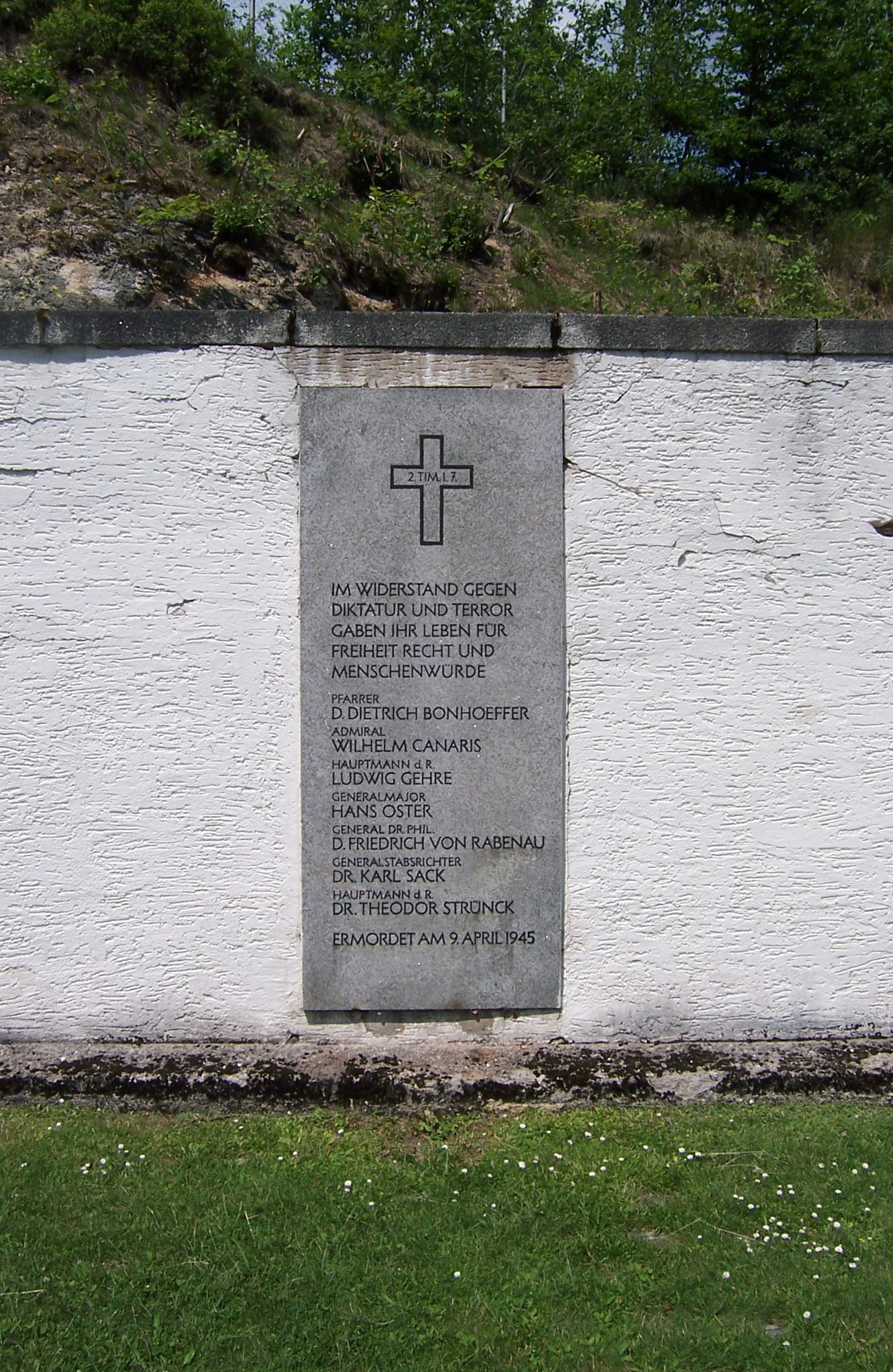
Memorial in Flossenbürg.

After the failed 20 July 1944 assassination attempt to kill Hitler, the search for Gehre intensified. Gehre, together with his wife, kept himself hidden for several more weeks. Further shelter was procured by the brothers Hans and Otto John. When Gehre realised that he was about to be discovered by the Gestapo on 2 November, he shot his wife and then directed the gun toward himself. Although he was badly hurt, he survived.

On 3 February 1945, the building of the Central Reich Security Office on Prinz-Albrecht-Straße, Berlin was destroyed. Gehre, along with Bonhoeffer, was sent to the Buchenwald concentration camp. From there, he was put onto a transport of SS special detainees and on 5 April incarcerated in the Flossenbürg concentration camp. On 9 April 1945, after an SS flying court-martial, Gehre and Bonhoeffer along with Admiral Wilhelm Canaris, General Hans Oster, General Karl Sack and Captain Theodor Strünck were executed at Flossenbürg by hanging.

In 1946, the individuals who had participated in the flying court-martial were brought to justice for murder. However Otto Thorbeck, the presiding officer, was exonerated after appeal. The decision was rescinded by the Berlin State Court in 1996.
