= Wilhelm Canaris =

German admiral & intelligence officer (1887–1945)

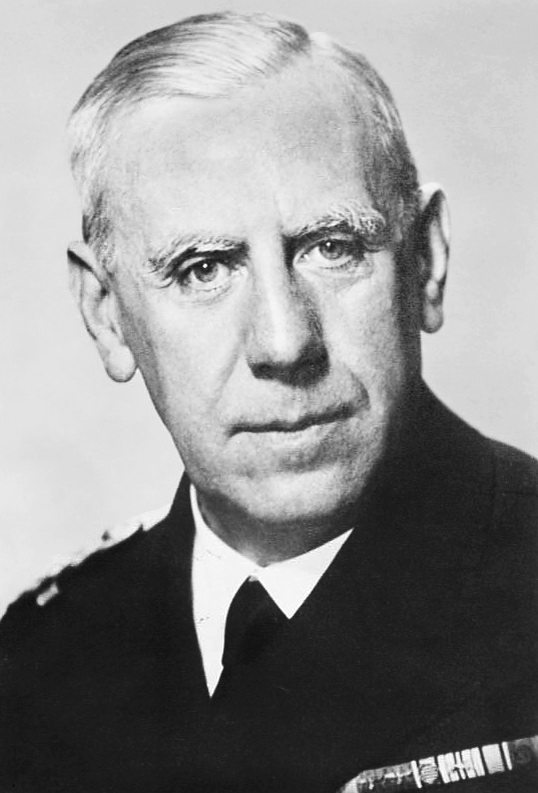
- Canaris in 1940

5th Chief of the Abwehr
- In office 1 January 1935 – 12 February 1944
- Deputy: Hans Oster
- Preceded by: Conrad Patzig
- Succeeded by: Georg Hansen

Personal details
- Born: Wilhelm Franz Canaris; 1 January 1887 Aplerbeck, Landkreis Dortmund, Province of Westphalia, Kingdom of Prussia, German Empire
- Died: 9 April 1945 (aged 58) Flossenbürg concentration camp, Flossenbürg, Nazi Germany; 49.734958°N 12.35577°E
- Cause of death: Execution by hanging
- Spouse: Erika Waag (m. 1919)
- Children: 2
- Education: German Imperial Naval Academy

Military service
- Allegiance: German Empire; Weimar Republic; Nazi Germany; German Resistance to Nazism
- Branch/service: Imperial German Navy; Reichsmarine; Kriegsmarine
- Years of service: 1905–1944
- Rank: Admiral
- Commands: U-38; UC-27; U-47; U-34; UB-128; Schlesien; Swinemünde Fortress; Abwehr
- Battles/wars: World War I; Battle of Coronel; Battle of the Falkland Islands; Battle of Más a Tierra; World War II
- Awards: Iron Cross (First Class); U-boat War Badge; German Cross in Silver

Wilhelm Franz Canaris (1 January 1887 – 9 April 1945) was a German admiral and the chief of the Abwehr (the German military-intelligence service) from 1935 to 1944. Initially a supporter of Adolf Hitler and the Nazi Party, Canaris turned against Hitler and committed acts of both passive and active resistance during World War II following the German invasion of Poland in 1939.

Being the head of Nazi Germany's military-intelligence agency, he was in a key position to participate in resistance and sabotage the Nazi war effort. As the war turned against Germany, Canaris and other military officers expanded their clandestine opposition to the leadership of Nazi Germany. By 1945, his acts of resistance and sabotage against the Nazi regime came to light and Canaris was hanged in the Flossenbürg concentration camp for high treason as the Allied forces advanced through southern Germany.

== Early life ==
Canaris was born on 1 January 1887 in Aplerbeck (now a part of Dortmund) in Westphalia, the son of Carl Canaris, a wealthy industrialist, and his wife, Auguste (née Popp). Canaris believed that his family was related to the 19th-century Greek admiral and politician Konstantinos Kanaris, a belief that influenced his decision to join the Imperial German Navy. On a visit to Corfu, he was given a portrait of the Greek hero, which he always kept in his office. However, a genealogical investigation in 1938 revealed that Canaris and his patrilineal ancestors were actually of Northern Italian descent, the family name had originally been Canarisi, and they had lived in Germany since the 17th century. His grandfather had converted from Catholicism to Lutheranism. However, even after learning this fact, he insisted that the Greek admiral Kanaris was his ancestor. He kept his portrait up and continued to tell visitors that the Greek admiral was, in fact, his "grandfather".

Canaris graduated from the Steinbart-Real High School in Duisburg. From an early age, he aspired to be an officer in the Imperial Navy, but his father encouraged him to join the Imperial Army. The death of Carl Canaris in 1904 removed the only obstacle to Canaris pursuing a naval career, which he did a month after his March 1905 graduation. Accepted at the naval academy in Kiel, Canaris began his naval education aboard SMS Stein, a training ship on which sea cadets learned basic seamanship. He attained midshipman's rank in 1906, and beginning in April 1907 attended the academic course required of aspiring naval officers. In the autumn of 1908 he began service aboard SMS Bremen, which cruised the Atlantic near Central and South America. In February 1909, Canaris received Venezuela's Order of the Liberator (Knight's Class) from President Juan Vicente Gómez. The circumstances are not known, but may have included Canaris facilitating discussions between representatives of the German government and then-Vice President Gómez in early 1908.

In August 1910, he received his commission as a lieutenant.

== World War I ==
By the outbreak of the First World War in 1914, Canaris was serving as a naval intelligence officer on board SMS Dresden, a light cruiser to which he had been assigned in December 1911. This was the only warship of Admiral Maximilian von Spee's East Asia Squadron that managed to evade the Royal Navy for a prolonged period during the Battle of the Falkland Islands in December 1914.

After the Battle of Más a Tierra, the immobilized Dresden anchored in Cumberland Bay, Robinson Crusoe Island and contacted Chile with regard to internment. While in the bay, Royal Navy ships approached and shelled Dresden, and the crew scuttled the ship. Most of the crew was interned in Chile in March 1915, but in August 1915, Canaris escaped under the name "Reed Rosas" by using his fluency in Spanish. With the help of some German merchants he was able to return to Germany in October 1915. On the way, he called at several ports, including Plymouth in Great Britain.

Canaris was then given intelligence work as a result of having come to the attention of German naval intelligence, possibly because of his clever escape from Chile. German plans to establish intelligence operations in the Mediterranean were under way and Canaris seemed a good fit for that role. Eventually, he was sent to Spain, where, in Madrid, his task was to provide clandestine reconnaissance over enemy shipping movements and to establish a supply service for U-boats serving in the Mediterranean. After being assigned to the Inspectorate of Submarines by the Naval Staff on 24 October 1916, he took up training for duty as a U-boat commander and graduated from Submarine School on 11 September 1917.

He ended the war as a U-boat commander from late 1917 in the Mediterranean and was credited with a number of sinkings and even came to the attention of the Kaiser. As a result of his exploits in Spain, he was awarded the Iron Cross First Class.

Canaris was fluent in six languages, including English. As a naval officer of the old school, he had a great respect for Britain's Royal Navy, despite the rivalry between the two nations.

== Inter-war years ==
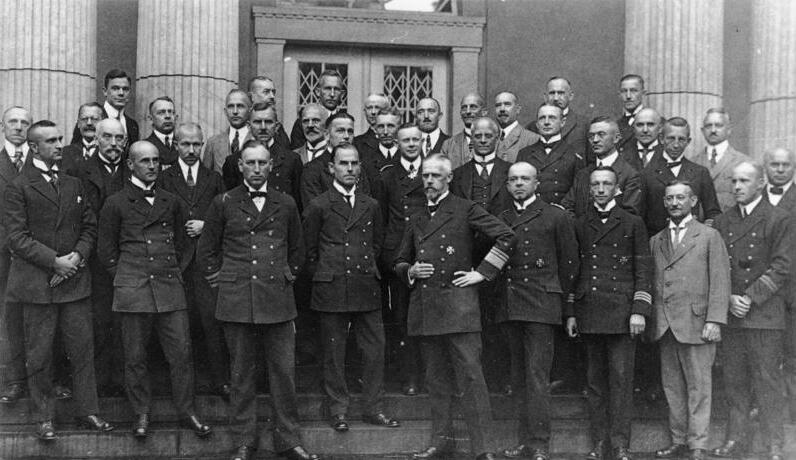
Canaris (second row, second from right) with other officers of the Marinekommandoamt (Naval Command Office), 1923

During the German Revolution of 1918–19, Canaris helped organise the formation of Freikorps paramilitary units to suppress the communist revolutionary movements, whose members were attempting to spread the ideals of the Russian Revolution into Germany. Canaris was also a member of the military court that tried and in many cases acquitted those involved in the murders of the leftist revolutionaries Karl Liebknecht and Rosa Luxemburg for their involvement in the Spartacist uprising. He helped one of those convicted in the murders, Kurt Vogel, escape from prison and although Canaris was imprisoned for four days over this, he was never prosecuted. Despite these actions, Canaris was eventually appointed to the adjutancy of Defence Minister Gustav Noske.

In 1919, he married Erika Waag, the child of an industrialist, with whom he had two children.

On 20 July 1920, Canaris became admiral's staff officer at the Marinestation der Ostsee (Baltic Naval Station) command.

In the spring of 1924, Canaris was sent to Osaka, Japan, to supervise a secret U-boat construction program in direct violation of the Treaty of Versailles. When that project was shelved by Vice Admiral Adolf Zenker in favour of a more co-operative relationship with the British, Canaris began making deals. Aided by Captain Walter Lohmann, the son of a powerful German shipping magnate, they negotiated with Spanish merchants, German industrialists, some Argentinian venture capitalists and the Spanish Navy so the Germans could continue their clandestine naval activities. Canaris made some enemies within Germany during the course of his secret business and intelligence negotiations, partially as a consequence of the bankruptcy incurred by the film-maker Phoebus Film in his dealings with Lohmann (the 'Lohmann Affair'). Suddenly, the former involvement with the "Liebknecht affair" re-emerged and placed Canaris in an unfavourable light, which ended up costing him his position in Spain. Instead, he was sent to Wilhelmshaven. From his new post, Canaris haplessly discovered that Lohmann's "investments" had cost upwards of 26 million marks in total losses.

At some point in 1928, Canaris was removed from his intelligence post and began two years of conventional naval service aboard the pre-dreadnought battleship Schlesien, becoming captain of the vessel on 1 December 1932. Just two months later, Adolf Hitler became Germany's new chancellor. Canaris was enthused by that development and was known to give lectures about the virtues of Nazism to his crew aboard the Schlesien.

Detached from the previous government of Weimar, whose republican principles never appealed to Canaris, he looked to the Nazi Party to shape the future. Two things stood out for Canaris about the Nazis: they represented a return to state-centered authoritarian government led by a charismatic leader, which he supported; and they were determined to throw off the shackles of the Treaty of Versailles. Hitler proselytised a return to world-power status, which for Canaris implied constructing a super-fleet and the preservation of a virtuous soldier-based society, a "community under arms". In contrast to his later actions in which he sought to undermine Germany's far right in the form of Hitler and the Nazis, in the turmoil after the First World War, while the Weimar government was fledgling, Canaris helped establish home guard units in contravention of the treaty, sympathised with the Freikorps movement and participated in the Kapp Putsch.

Another aspect of the Nazis that appealed to Canaris was their anticommunism. Many of his friends joined the Nazi crusade, and Canaris "likewise came to be regarded as an enthusiastic National Socialist". A former SS general, Werner Best, once described Canaris as an "inveterate nationalist" and correspondingly asserted that Canaris felt the Nazis were much better "than anything that had gone before". Even after the Night of the Long Knives, Canaris "preached wholehearted cooperation with the new regime". Canaris once said, "we officers... should always recognize that without the Führer and his NSDAP, the restoration of German military greatness and military strength would not have been possible... the officer's duty is to be a living example of National Socialism and make the German Wehrmacht (Armed Forces) reflect the fulfillment of National Socialist ideology. That must be our grand design".

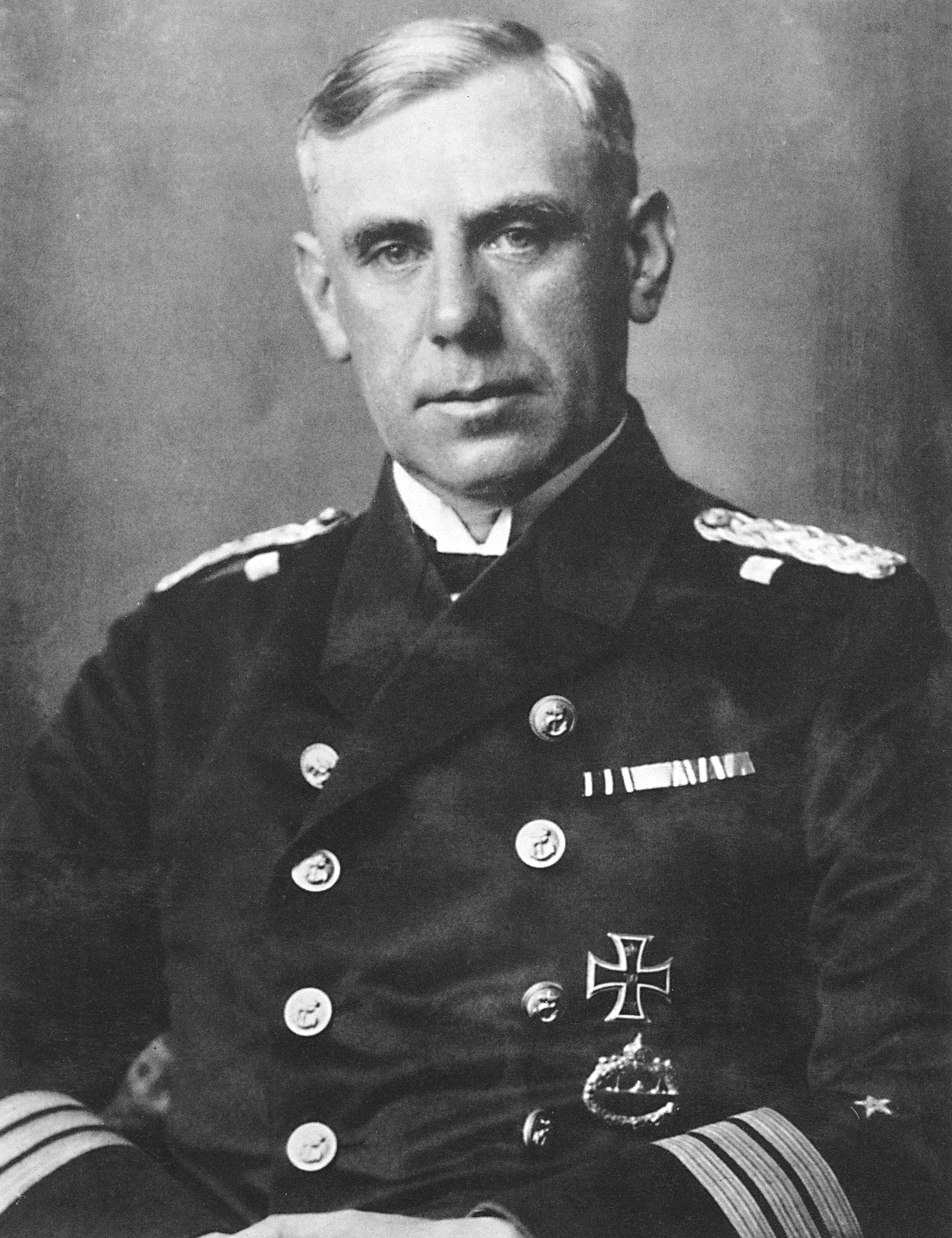
Canaris as a Korvettenkapitän, 1924–31

Taking a position as the fortress commander at Swinemünde on 29 September 1934, Canaris seemed to be near the end of his career as he settled into a sort of "provincial exile" with his family. Then, in short order, Canaris caught wind of the dispute in the Reichswehr Ministry over the impending successor to the Abwehr chief, Captain Conrad Patzig, who was forced to resign. Patzig recommended Canaris as his replacement because of his outstanding service record and because he considered him best suited for the position from his previous experience in intelligence operations. His aspirations were quickly being realized, and in his zeal for his new job, Canaris paid "little heed" to the warnings from Patzig about the "fiendish" machinations of the party and its police organs. The admonitions principally concerned Reinhard Heydrich, the head of the SS intelligence service known as the Sicherheitsdienst (SD), who was not well-disposed towards the Abwehr since he believed that Germany's defeat during the First World War was attributable to military intelligence failures by the organization. Moreover, Heydrich had aspirations to oversee all aspects of political intelligence-gathering for Germany.

On 1 January 1935, a little less than two years after Hitler had taken control of the German government, Canaris was made head of the Abwehr, Germany's official military intelligence agency. Records suggest that Canaris was approved in his role as Abwehr chief as a compromise candidate since the commander-in-chief of the German Navy, Admiral Erich Raeder, a staunch navy man, was initially opposed to his appointment but caved when Patzig manipulated the situation by suggesting an army officer for the post if Canaris was rejected.

With the seemingly-amicable relationship between Heydrich and Canaris that then existed, according to former Abwehr Secretary Inge Haag, it is possible that Heydrich supported the installment of Canaris as head of the Abwehr at least based on their behaviour toward each other. The two remained "friendly" rivals, but Canaris considered Heydrich a "brutal fanatic" and was likewise aware that Heydrich's SD constantly monitored the telephone traffic of the Abwehr. Heydrich was suspicious of Canaris, referred to him as a "wily old fox", and cautioned his colleagues never to underestimate the man.

Just a few weeks into his role as head of the Abwehr, Canaris met with Heydrich and some of his officials to parcel out intelligence operations between the Abwehr, Gestapo, and SD. It is clear from sources that Canaris was then a true devotee to Hitler according to a former Gestapo officer, Gerhard Fischer, who claimed that the Führer's gentlemanly relationship with Canaris converted the latter into "an extreme exponent of Hitlerism."

In May 1935, Canaris first donned the uniform of a rear admiral, a promotion that coincided with his responsibility for shielding Germany's burgeoning rearmament program from enemy counterintelligence agents, which meant a significant expansion of the Abwehr. The enlargement of the Abwehr mission brought Canaris into contact with "counterespionage virtuoso" Major Rudolf Bamler, who assisted him in establishing an extensive surveillance web over munitions factories, seaports, the armed forces and the media. Between 1935 and 1937, Canaris expanded the Abwehr staff from a mere 150 people to nearly 1,000. He met Heydrich again on 21 December 1936, and the two men signed a document, which came to be known in their orbit as the "Ten Commandments". The agreement clarified the respective areas of counterespionage responsibilities between the Gestapo and the Abwehr.

According to the biographer Heinz Höhne, Canaris subscribed to most of Hitler's views since Hitler's nationalism, his social-Darwinist beliefs, his opposition to the Versailles Treaty, his belief in rebuilding a Greater German Reich, and his anti-Semitic ideology appealed to the Abwehr chief. Prompted by anti-Semitism, Canaris first suggested the use of the Star of David to identify Jews in 1935 to 1936, which was later used to set them apart from German citizens within the Reich, and eventually heralded their isolation, presaged their compulsory resettlement, and ultimately led to their physical annihilation.

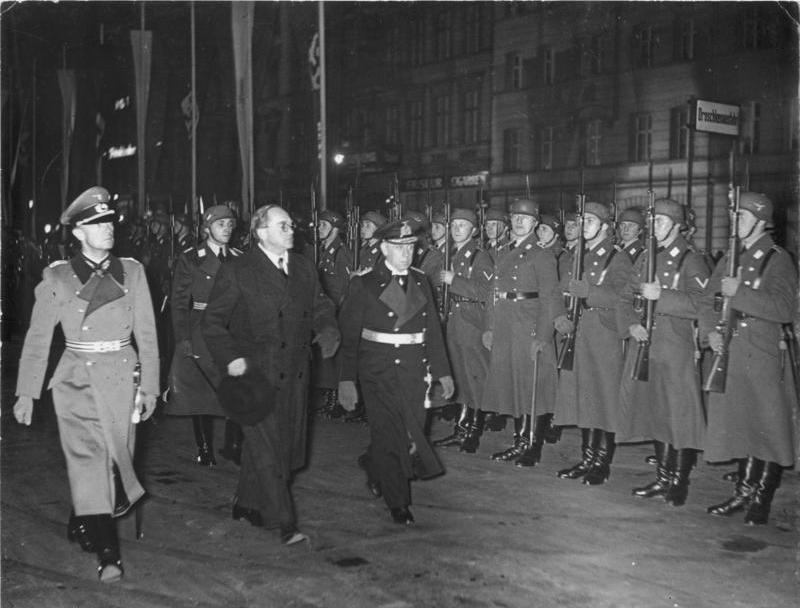
South African Minister of Defence Oswald Pirow walking in front of an honor guard during his visit to Berlin, to his left is Canaris, November 1938

During the Spanish Civil War (1936–1939), Germany signed an international agreement to embargo arms to the warring factions, the Nationalists, led by Francisco Franco, and the Republicans. In fact, Germany provided aid to Franco's side, with Canaris using his contacts at England's Vickers armaments manufacturing company to help supply the Nationalists with weapons.

One month before Hitler's annexation of Austria, known as the Anschluss, Canaris put the Abwehr into action and personally oversaw deception operations, which were designed to give the Austrians the impression of what appeared to be substantial German military preparations for an impending act of aggression. However, the sham action did not move Austrian Chancellor Schuschnigg, who was forced to resign when German troops marched into Austria, which was followed by its official annexation into Greater Germany (Grossdeutschland) on 13 March 1938.

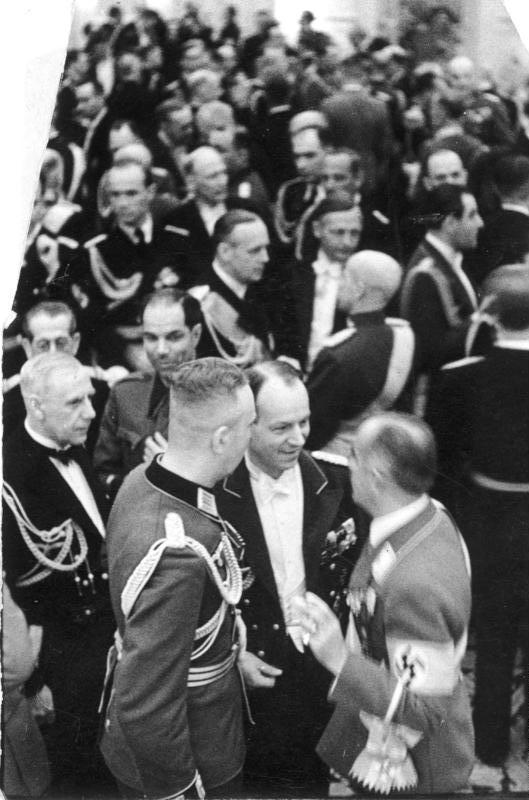
Canaris (left) at the reception for Hitler's 50th birthday, 21 April 1939

At that development, however, Canaris began spending more and more time in the company of Hans Oster and also began formulating ways to forestall or prevent a European war. Among the first to arrive in Vienna, Canaris had a special team seize records from the Austrian archives since he feared possible references to his Spanish Civil War arms supplier connections in London. He also absorbed as much of the Austrian intelligence service as he could into the Abwehr while he avoided those who were already Nazi converts.

Canaris, among others, was disturbed by Hitler's intention to absorb Czechoslovakia, as they feared another European war. This resulted in the formation of a conspiratorial group consisting of members of the German Foreign Office and ranking members of the military. The assemblage included General Ludwig Beck, the Foreign Office's state secretary Ernst von Weizsäcker, General Erwin von Witzleben and Admiral Canaris.

=== Munich Agreement and intrigue ===
Canaris and his associates were not necessarily committed to the overthrow of Hitler's regime, but they were loosely allied to another more radical group: the "anti-Nazi" faction, led by Colonel Hans Oster and Hans Bernd Gisevius, which wanted to use the crisis as an excuse for executing a putsch to overthrow the Nazi regime. The most audacious plan contemplated by Canaris, in collaboration with Ewald von Kleist-Schmenzin, was to capture and to unseat Hitler and the entire Nazi Party before the invasion of Czechoslovakia. At that particular moment, Kleist visited Britain secretly and discussed the situation with British MI6 and some high-ranking politicians.

The high-ranking German military leaders believed that if Hitler invaded Czechoslovakia or any other country, Britain would declare war on Germany. MI6 was of the same opinion. The British declaration of war would have given the General Staff, it thought, both the pretext and the support for an overthrow of Hitler, which many of them were planning because of the prevailing "anti-war sentiment of the German people".

The reaction of the British government to Hitler's demands on the Sudetenland was more cautious. At a meeting with Hitler in Munich, British Prime Minister Neville Chamberlain and French Prime Minister Édouard Daladier chose diplomacy over war. The Munich Agreement was thus a severe disappointment for Kleist and Canaris. It gave Hitler's reputation an important boost and his popularity soared, as he appeared to have brought peace. However, Hitler was scornful of his generals for resisting his plans since he had wanted war. Hermann Göring fell out of favour with him for negotiating peace, but Hitler's drive for war remained unabated although the Western powers had granted him concessions. Canaris was relieved that war was averted and sought to re-establish contact with Hitler since many of the Abwehr reports submitted on the Sudeten crisis had proven to be grossly inaccurate. To Hans Oster and his circle, Canaris suddenly appeared recommitted to Hitler.

=== Dutch War Scare ===
In January 1939, Canaris manufactured the "Dutch War Scare", which gripped the British government. By 23 January 1939, the British government received information that Germany intended to invade the Netherlands in February 1939 with the aim of using Dutch airfields to launch a strategic bombing offensive intended to achieve a "knock-out" blow against Britain by razing British cities to the ground. All of that information was false but was intended by Canaris to achieve a change in British foreign policy. Canaris was successful, and the "Dutch War Scare" played a major role in causing Chamberlain to make the "continental commitment" by pledging in February 1939 to send a British ground force to the defence of France in the event of war.

=== United States ===
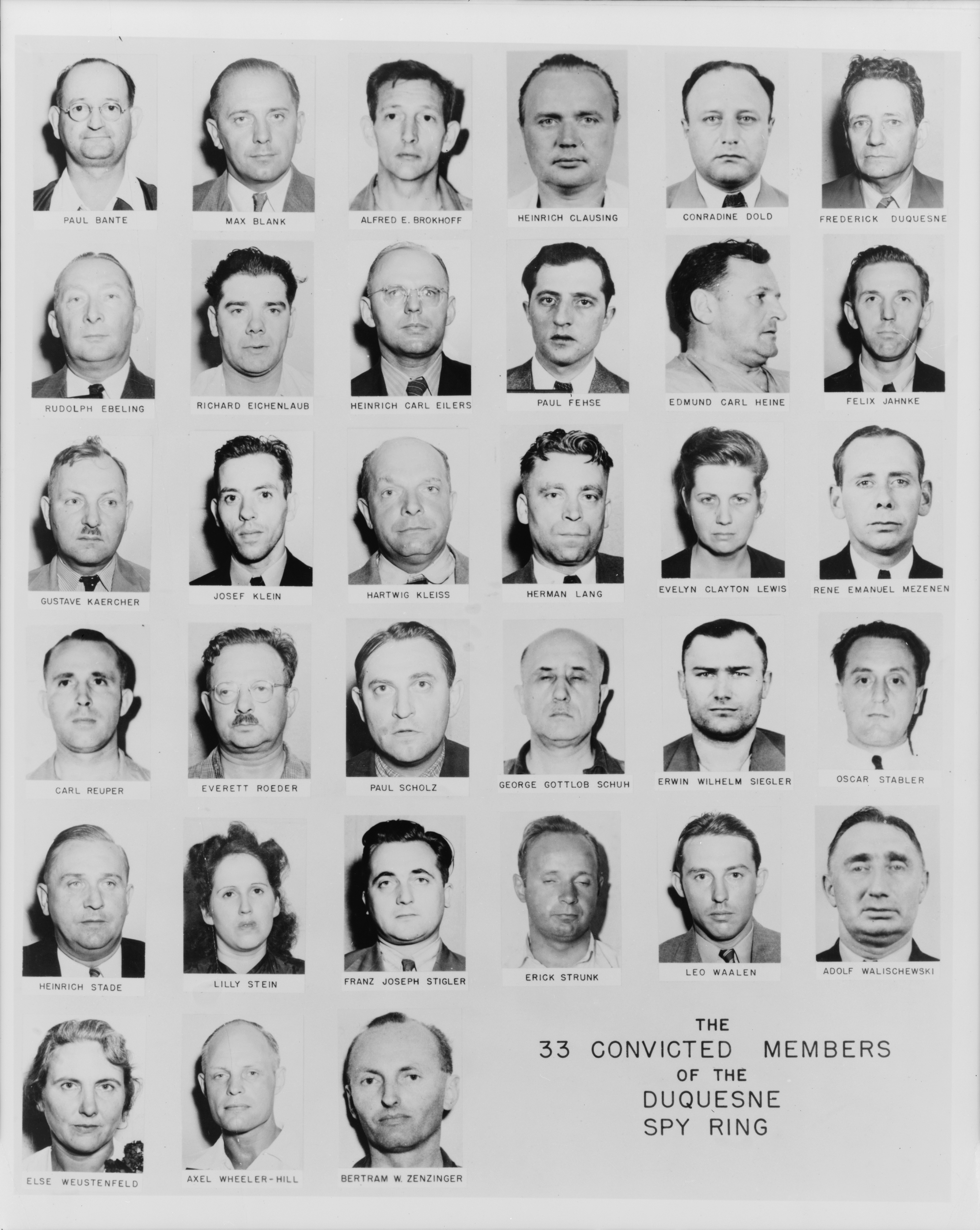
The 33 convicted members of the Duquesne spy ring. Duquesne is pictured in the top, right; Lang is in the third row, fourth from left. (FBI print)

In 1937, Canaris created a new office of air intelligence in the Abwehr and assigned Hauptmann Nikolaus Ritter of the Luftwaffe to be the chief of I. Luft (Chief of Air Intelligence). Ritter, who had lived in the United States for twelve years, was given primary authority over Abwehr agents operating in the Americas and Britain. Canaris instructed Ritter to contact and reactivate a former German Naval Intelligence spymaster living in New York City whom Canaris knew from the First World War, Fritz Joubert Duquesne. Duquesne was an Afrikaner who had escaped from a prisoner-of-war camp in the British Imperial fortress colony of Bermuda during the Second Boer War and had been falsely credited for the death of British Army Field Marshal Herbert Kitchener, 1st Earl Kitchener in the sinking of HMS Hampshire during the First World War. Back in 1931, Ritter had met Duquesne in New York, and both spies reconnected in New York on 3 December 1937. Ritter also met with Herman W. Lang, a spy who operated under the code name PAUL.

Herman Lang worked as a machinist, draftsman and assembly inspector for the Carl L. Norden Company in New York, which had been contracted to manufacture an advanced top-secret military bomber part, the Norden bomb-sight. He provided the Abwehr a large drawing of the bomb-sight and later went to Germany to work on and finish an improved version. In Germany, Lang debriefed with both Canaris and Göring. Ritter employed several other successful agents across the United States, but he also made the mistake of recruiting a man who would later become a double agent for the Federal Bureau of Investigation (FBI), William Sebold. On 8 February 1940, Ritter sent Sebold to New York under the alias of Harry Sawyer and instructed him to set up a shortwave radio-transmitting station to establish contact with the German shortwave station abroad. Sebold was also instructed to use the codename TRAMP and to contact a fellow agent, codenamed DUNN, Fritz Duquesne.

On 28 June 1941, after a two-year investigation, the FBI arrested Duquesne and 32 other Nazi spies on charges of relaying secret information on US weaponry and shipping movements to Germany. On 2 January 1942, less than a month after the US was attacked by Japan at Pearl Harbor and Germany had declared war on the United States, the 33 members of the Duquesne Spy Ring were sentenced to serve a total of more than 300 years in prison. They were found guilty in what historian Peter Duffy said in 2014 is "still to this day the largest espionage case in the history of the United States".

One German spymaster later commented that the ring's roundup delivered "the death blow" to their espionage efforts in the United States. J. Edgar Hoover called his FBI swoop on Duquesne's ring the greatest spy roundup in US history. In a 1942 memo to his superiors, Canaris reported on the importance of several of his captured spies by noting their valued contributions, and he wrote that Duquesne had "delivered valuable reports and important technical material in the original, including U.S. gas masks, radio-controlled apparatus, leak proof fuel tanks, television instruments, small bombs for airplanes versus airplanes, air separator, and propeller-driving mechanisms. Items delivered were labeled 'valuable', and several 'good' and 'very good'".

== Second World War ==
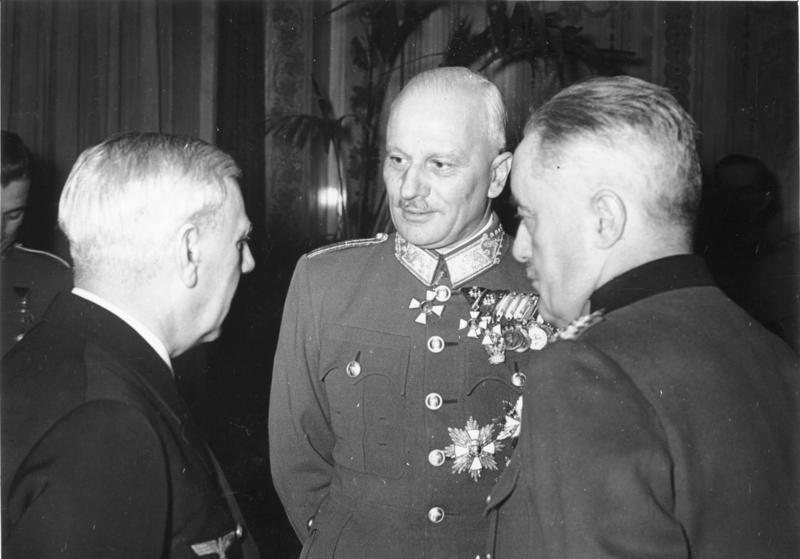
Canaris with the Hungarian Minister of Defence Károly Bartha and Glaise-Horstenau, the former Vice-Chancellor of Austria, January 1941

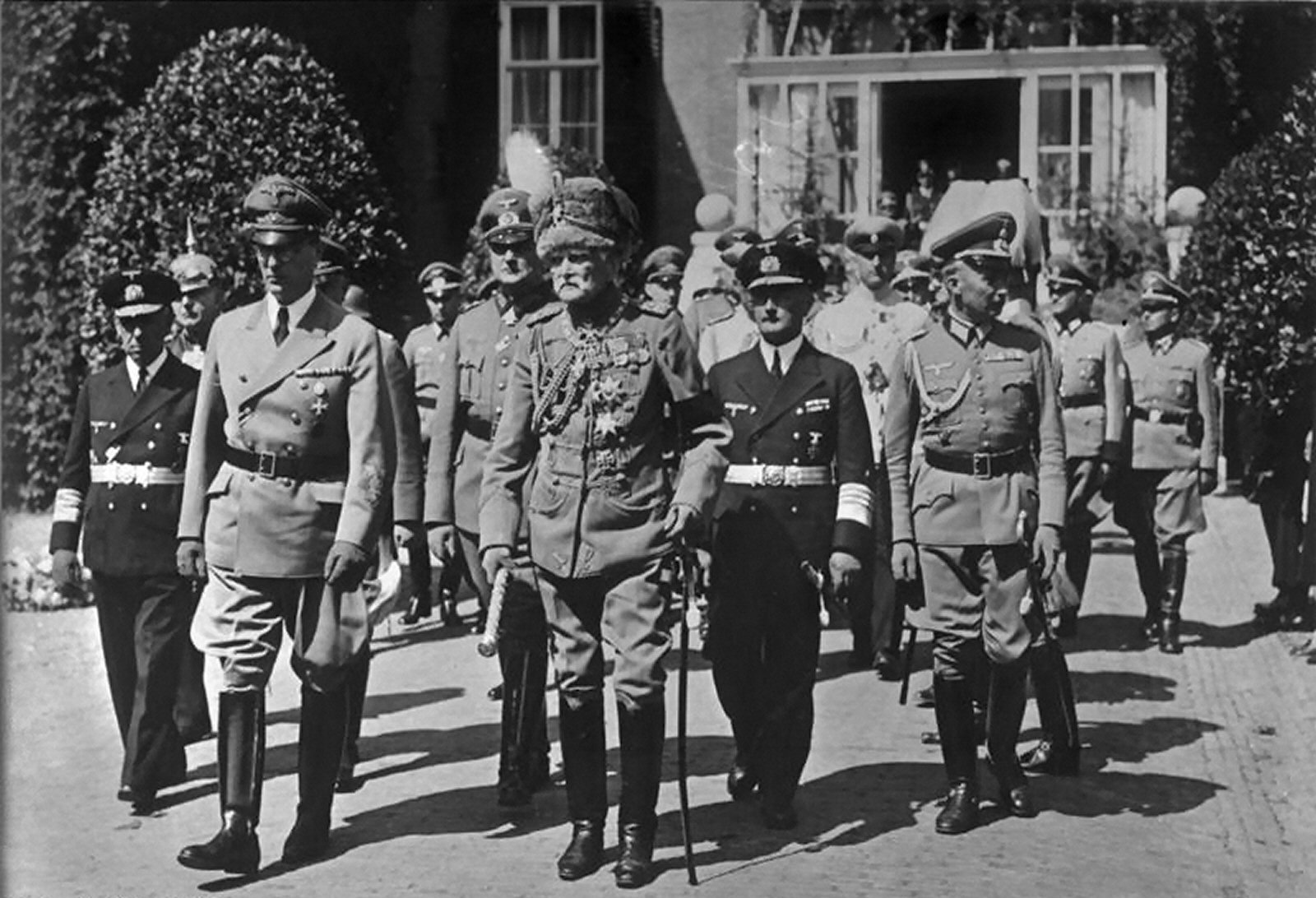
Canaris (left) at Wilhelm II's funeral, June 1941

After the outbreak of war between Germany and Poland in September 1939, Canaris visited the front, where he saw the devastation caused by the German military. Seeing Warsaw in flames nearly brought him to tears and it was reported that he exclaimed, "our children's children will have to bear the blame for this". He also witnessed examples of the war crimes committed by the Einsatzgruppen of the SS, including the burning of the synagogue in Będzin with 200 Polish Jews inside. Moreover, he received reports from Abwehr agents about several incidents of mass murder throughout Poland. Canaris visited Hitler's headquarters train on 12 September 1939, then in the Province of Silesia, to register his objection to the atrocities. Canaris told chief of the Oberkommando der Wehrmacht (OKW, Supreme Command of the Armed Forces) Wilhelm Keitel about the "extensive shootings... and that the nobility and clergy were to be exterminated" to which Keitel informed him that Hitler had already "decided" the matter. Keitel warned Canaris to go no further with his protest, as the detailed plan of atrocities came directly from Hitler.

Canaris began working more actively to overthrow Hitler's regime, but he co-operated with the SD as a decoy measure. This ensured that he was trusted by Hitler and senior Nazis for some time. He was promoted to the rank of full admiral in January 1940. With his subordinate Erwin Lahousen, he attempted in the autumn of 1940 to form a circle of like-minded Wehrmacht officers, but that had little success at the time. When the OKW decrees regarding the brutal treatment of Soviet prisoners of war related to the Commissar Order came to the attention of Canaris in mid-September 1941, he registered another complaint. Keitel reminded Canaris that he was thinking in terms of "chivalrous war," which did not apply, since it was "a matter of destroying a world ideology."

Meanwhile, the complaints and Canaris's apparent squeamishness were noted by Heydrich and added to his file on the "political unreliability" of the Abwehr. Canaris also worked to thwart the proposed Operation Felix, the German plan to seize Gibraltar.

At a conference of senior officers in Berlin, in December 1941, Canaris is quoted as saying that "the Abwehr has nothing to do with the persecution of Jews.... no concern of ours, we hold ourselves aloof from it."

Canaris had a sexual relationship with a Polish spy based in Switzerland, Halina Szymanska, who passed information from him to the Polish government-in-exile based in London and also put her at the disposal of the British and Americans, including Allen Dulles. A key piece of intelligence that passed from Canaris via Szymanska to the Allies was advance warning of the launch of Operation Barbarossa, the German invasion of the Soviet Union.

The head of MI6, Stewart Menzies, who shared Canaris's anticommunism, praised Canaris's courage and bravery at the end of the war. In December 1940, Hitler sent Canaris to Spain to conclude an agreement, through strong coercion if necessary, with Franco for Spanish support in the war against the Allies, but instead of prompting him to acquiesce to Hitler's desire, Canaris reported that Franco would not commit Spanish forces until Britain had been defeated. Conversations from the period between Franco and Canaris remain unknown, since none were recorded, but the Spanish government expressed gratitude to Canaris's widow by paying her a pension. Franco remained "forever grateful" to Canaris for his advice to keep Spain out of the war.

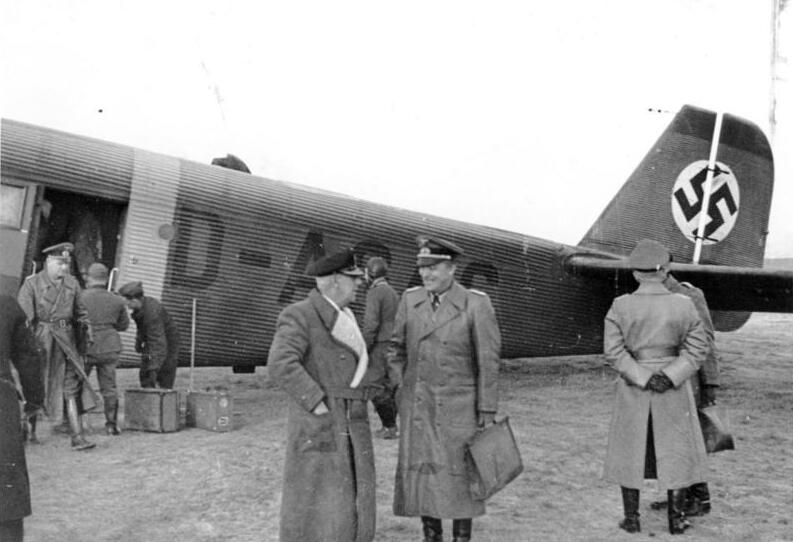
Canaris during a visit to the Eastern Front, near Smolensk, October 1941

In June 1942, Canaris sent eight Abwehr agents to the East Coast of the United States as part of Operation Pastorius. The mission was to sabotage American economic targets and demoralise the US civilian population. However, two weeks later, all were arrested by the FBI thanks to two Abwehr agents who betrayed the mission. Because the Abwehr agents were arrested in civilian clothes, they were subject to court martial by a military tribunal in Washington, DC. All were found guilty and sentenced to death. Two others who co-operated with the FBI received sentences of life imprisonment instead. The others were executed by the electric chair in the District of Columbia jail. Because of the embarrassing failure of Operation Pastorius, there were no further sabotage attempts in the United States.

After 1942, Canaris visited Spain frequently and was probably in contact with British agents from Gibraltar. In 1943, in occupied France, Canaris is said to have made contact with British agents. In Paris, he was conducted blindfolded to the Convent of the Nuns of the Passion of Our Blessed Lord, 127 Rue de la Santé, where he met the local head of the British Intelligence Services, codenamed "Jade Amicol", who was in reality Colonel Ollivier. Canaris wanted to know the terms for peace if Germany got rid of Hitler. Churchill's reply, sent to him two weeks later, was simple: "Unconditional surrender."

Meanwhile, Heydrich remained suspicious of the Abwehr. Not long after Heydrich was posted in Prague, he requested that Canaris place the Abwehr under SD and SS control, which pitted the two men against one another over jurisdictional control. Canaris handled the situation diplomatically, with no immediate effect on the Abwehr, but it did mean a greater degree of collaboration and SS control in Prague. Despite the two men experiencing professional differences, Canaris seems to have maintained a personal relationship with Heydrich and was "deeply shaken" by the latter's assassination a few weeks after their administrative disagreements.

Playing both sides, Canaris established two more links with the British MI6, one via Zürich and the other via Spain and Gibraltar. Vatican contacts may have also provided a third route to his British counterparts. Canaris also intervened to save a number of victims from Nazi persecution, including Jews, by getting them out of harm's way. He was instrumental, for example, in getting 500 Dutch Jews to safety in May 1941. Many such people were given token training as Abwehr "agents" and then issued papers, which allowed them to leave Germany. One notable person he is said to have assisted was the then Lubavitcher Rebbe in Warsaw, Rabbi Yosef Yitzchok Schneersohn. That has led Chabad Lubavitch to campaign for his recognition as a Righteous Gentile by the Yad Vashem Holocaust memorial.

== Downfall and execution ==
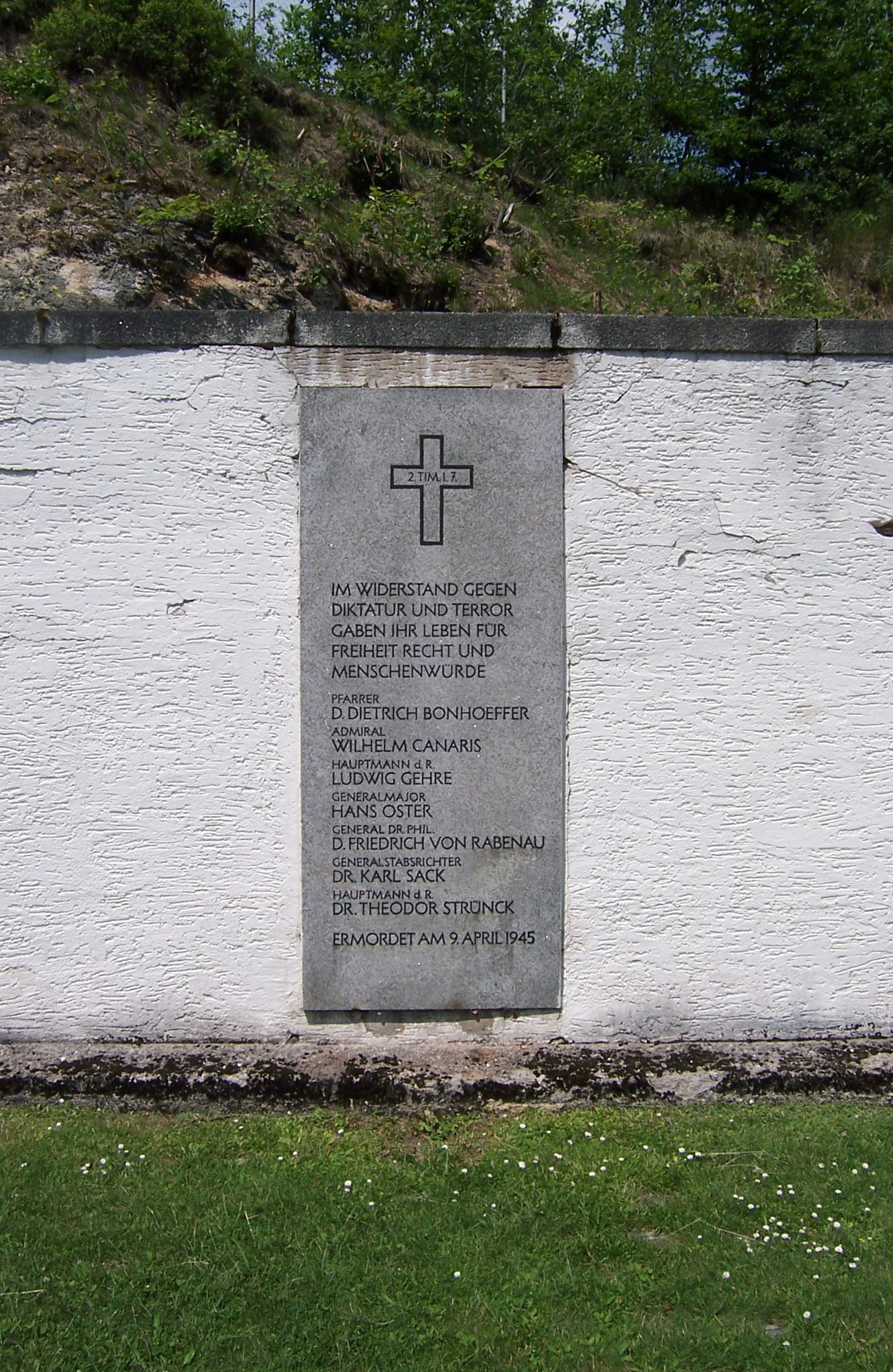
Memorial at Flossenbürg concentration camp to the German resistance members executed on 9 April 1945

The evidence that Canaris was playing a double game grew, and at the insistence of Heinrich Himmler, Hitler dismissed Canaris and abolished the Abwehr in February 1944. Its functions were taken over by the Ausland-SD, part of the Reich Security Main Office and led by SS-Brigadeführer Walter Schellenberg. Previous areas that had been the responsibility of the Abwehr were divided between Gestapo chief Heinrich Müller and Schellenberg. Some weeks later, Canaris was put under house arrest. He was released in June 1944 to take up a post in Berlin as the head of the Special Staff for Mercantile Warfare and Economic Combat Measures (HWK), which coordinated the resistance to the Allied economic blockade of Germany.

Canaris was arrested on 23 July 1944 on the basis of the interrogation of his successor at Military Intelligence, Georg Hansen. Schellenberg respected Canaris and was convinced of his loyalty to the Nazi regime even though he had been arrested. Hansen admitted his role in the 20 July plot but accused Canaris of being its "spiritual instigator." No direct evidence of his involvement in the plot was discovered, but his close association with many of the plotters and certain documents written by him that were considered subversive led to the gradual assumption of his guilt. Two of the men under suspicion as conspirators who were known in Canaris's circle shot themselves, which incited activity from the Gestapo to prove he was at the very least privy to the plan against Hitler. When he was arrested, Canaris greeted the Gestapo in full dress uniform and saluted them with his ceremonial baton. They were naturally unamused and grabbed it from him while he was being handcuffed.

In the final weeks of the war, the Gestapo had moved Admiral Canaris and several other cohorts from Berlin to the Flossenbürg concentration camp in northeast Bavaria, with American troops less than 100 miles (160 km) away. Investigations dragged on inconclusively until April 1945, when orders were received to dispose of the various remaining prisoners of the plot. Canaris's personal diary was discovered in the Wehrmacht headquarters south of Berlin and presented to Hitler in early April 1945, which implicated him in the conspiracy. Loose pages from Canaris's diary recording coup discussions from autumn 1939 to spring 1940 were among the contents of the Zossen safe discovered by the Gestapo on 22 September 1944; the recovery of the diary's remainder in April 1945 enraged Hitler sufficiently to order the immediate execution of Canaris and the surviving members of the Abwehr resistance circle.

Canaris was placed on trial by an SS summary court, presided over by Otto Thorbeck with Walter Huppenkothen as prosecutor. He was charged with treason, convicted, and sentenced to death. Together with his deputy general, Hans Oster, the military jurist General Karl Sack, the theologian Dietrich Bonhoeffer, and military officer Ludwig Gehre, Canaris was led to the gallows naked and executed on 9 April, just weeks before the end of the European war.

During the previous night, Canaris tapped out a farewell message in Morse code to Danish spy chief Hans Lunding in the next cell: "Nose broken at last interrogation. My time is up. Was not a traitor. Did my duty as a German. If you survive remember me to my wife." (Note: Höhne contends it was "doubtful" that Lunding accurately preserved the verbatim message from Canaris.) On April 23, 1945 (roughly two weeks after the execution of Canaris) troops from the U.S. Army's 90th Infantry Division entered the Flossenbürg concentration camp, followed shortly thereafter by elements of the 97th Infantry Division.

Erwin von Lahousen and Hans Bernd Gisevius, two of Canaris's main subordinates, survived the war and testified during the Nuremberg trials about Canaris's courage in opposing Hitler. Lahousen recalled a conversation between Canaris and General Wilhelm Keitel in which Canaris warned Keitel that the German military would be held responsible for the atrocities in Poland. Keitel responded that they had been ordered by Hitler. Keitel, who survived the war, was found guilty of war crimes at Nuremberg and hanged.

== Film portrayals ==
- The 1954 film Canaris starring O. E. Hasse is based on his biography.
- Wilhelm Canaris is portrayed by Anthony Quayle in the 1976 film The Eagle Has Landed.
- Wilhelm Canaris is portrayed in the Czechoslovak film Atentát (1964).
- Canaris is portrayed by Denholm Elliott in Voyage of the Damned (1976).
- Canaris is portrayed in The Man Who Never Was (1956), played by Wolf Frees.
- Zygmunt Hübner played Wilhelm Canaris in the 12th episode of Polish TV series More Than Life At Stake.

== Bibliography ==
- Abshagen, Karl Heinz (1956). Canaris. London: Hutchinson. ASIN B001CD7LTW.
- Altein, Rachel (2002). Eliezer Y. Zaklikovsky (ed.). Out of the Inferno: The Efforts That Led to the Rescue of Rabbi Yosef Schneersohn of Lubavitch from War-Torn Europe in 1939–40. New York: Kehot. ISBN 978-0-82660-683-9.
- Bassett, Richard (2011). Hitler's Spy Chief: The Wilhelm Canaris Betrayal. New York: Pegasus Books. ISBN 978-1-60598-450-6.
- Bisher, Jamie (2016). The Intelligence War in Latin America, 1914–1922. Jefferson, NC: McFarland. ISBN 978-0-78643-350-6.
- Breitman, Richard; Goda, Norman J.W.; Naftali, Timothy; Wolfe, Robert (2005). U.S. Intelligence and the Nazis. Cambridge and New York: Cambridge University Press. ISBN 978-0-52161-794-9.
- Chowaniec, Elisabeth (1991). Der „Fall Dohnanyi" 1943–1945: Widerstand, Militärjustiz, SS-Willkür. Schriftenreihe der Vierteljahrshefte für Zeitgeschichte (in German). Vol. 62. Munich: R. Oldenbourg. ISBN 978-3-48664-562-0.
- Dabrowski, John R. (2008). "U.S. Army Liberates Flossenburg Concentration Camp". Carlisle Barracks, PA: US Army Heritage and Education Center.
- Delattre, Lucas (2006). A Spy at the Heart of the Third Reich. New York: Grove Press. ISBN 978-0-80214-231-3.
- Duffy, Peter (2014). Double Agent. New York: Scribner. ISBN 978-1-4516-6795-0.
- Evans, Leslie (1 April 2014). "Fritz Joubert Duquesne: Boer Avenger, German Spy, Munchausen Fantasist". Boryanabooks.
- Evans, Richard (2006). The Third Reich in Power. New York: Penguin. ISBN 978-0-14303-790-3.
- Gerwarth, Robert (2012). Hitler's Hangman: The Life of Heydrich. New Haven, CT: Yale University Press. ISBN 978-0-30018-772-4.
- Gilbert, Martin (2004). The Second World War: A Complete History. New York: Henry Holt. ISBN 978-0-80507-623-3.
- Hildebrand, Klaus (1973). The Foreign Policy of the Third Reich. Berkeley and Los Angeles: University of California Press. ISBN 0-520-02528-8.
- Hoffmann, Peter (1977). The History of the German Resistance, 1933–1945. Cambridge, MA: MIT Press. ISBN 978-0-26208-088-0.
- Höhne, Heinz (1979). Canaris: Hitler's Master Spy. New York: Doubleday. ISBN 0-385-08777-2.
- Höhne, Heinz (2001). The Order of the Death's Head: The Story of Hitler's SS. New York: Penguin Press. ISBN 978-0-14139-012-3.
- Jacobsen, Hans-Adolf (1968). "The Kommissarbefehl and Mass Executions of Soviet Russian Prisoners of War". In Krausnick, Helmut; Buchheim, Hans; Broszat, Martin; Jacobsen, Hans-Adolf (eds.). Anatomy of the SS State. New York: Walker and Company. ISBN 978-0-00211-026-6.
- Johnson, David Alan (2007). Betrayal: The True Story of J. Edgar Hoover and the Nazi Saboteurs Captured During WWII. New York: Hippocrene Books. ISBN 978-0-78181-173-6.
- Johnson, David Alan (2024). Admiral Canaris: How Hitler's Chief of Intelligence Betrayed the Nazis. Simon and Schuster. ISBN 978-1-63388-999-6.
- Kahn, David (1978). Hitler's Spies: German Intelligence in World War II. New York: MacMillan. ISBN 0-02-560610-7.
- Kershaw, Ian (2001). Hitler: 1936–1945, Nemesis. New York: W. W. Norton & Company. ISBN 978-0-39332-252-1.
- Kershaw, Ian (2008). Hitler: A Biography. New York: W. W. Norton & Company. ISBN 978-0-393-06757-6.
- Lindgren, Henrik (1970). "Adam von Trotts Reisen nach Schweden 1942–1944. Ein Beitrag zur Frage der Auslandsverbindungen des deutschen Widerstandes" [Adam von Trott's Travels to Sweden 1942–1944. A Contribution to the Question of Foreign Connections to the German Resistance]. Vierteljahrshefte für Zeitgeschichte (in German). 18 (3). Munich: Oldenbourg Wissenschaftsverlag GmbH: 274–291. JSTOR 30197746.
- MacDonnell, Francis (1995). Insidious Foes: The Axis Fifth Column and the American Home Front. Oxford and New York: Oxford University Press. ISBN 978-0-19509-268-4.
- Mueller, Michael (2007). Canaris: The Life and Death of Hitler's Spymaster. Annapolis, MD: Naval Institute Press. ISBN 978-1-5911-4101-3.
- Müller, Klaus-Jürgen (1985). "The Structure and Nature of the National Conservative Opposition in Germany up to 1940". In H.W. Koch (ed.). Aspects of the Third Reich. New York and London: Palgrave Macmillan. ISBN 978-0-33335-273-1.
- Rich, Norman (1973). Hitler's War Aims: Ideology, the Nazi State, and the Course of Expansion. New York: W. W. Norton & Company. ISBN 0-393-05454-3.
- Shirer, William (1990). The Rise and Fall of the Third Reich. New York: MJF Books. ISBN 978-1-56731-163-1.
- Staff, Gary (2011). Battle on the Seven Seas: German Cruiser Battles, 1914–1918. Barnsley: Pen & Sword Maritime. ISBN 978-1-84884-182-6.
- Stewart, William (2009). Admirals of the World: A Biographical Dictionary, 1500 to the Present. Jefferson, NC and London: McFarland & Company. ISBN 978-0-78643-809-9.
- Suhr, Heiko (2020). Wilhelm Canaris: Lehrjahre eines Geheimdienstchefs (1905–1934) (in German). Wachholtz Verlag. p. 216. ISBN 978-3-529-09551-1.
- Trigg, Jonathan (2019). D-Day Through German Eyes: How the Wehrmacht Lost France. Stroude, Gloucestershire, England: Amberley Publishing. ISBN 978-1-4456-8931-9.
- Wagner, Matthew (4 August 2009). "Chabad: Make Nazi Commander a Righteous Gentile". The Jerusalem Post.
- Waller, John (1996). The Unseen War in Europe: Espionage and Conspiracy in the Second World War. New York: Random House. ISBN 978-0-67944-826-6.
- Watt, Donald Cameron (1989). How War Came: Immediate Origins of the Second World War, 1938–1939. New York: Pantheon. ISBN 978-0-67973-093-4.
- Wheeler-Bennett, John W. (1980). Nemesis of Power: The German Army in Politics 1918–1945. Basingstoke: Palgrave Macmillan. ISBN 0-333-06864-5.
- Wichmann, Manfred (14 September 2014). "Wilhelm Canaris 1887–1945". Lebendiges Museum Online (LEMO).
- Wistrich, Robert (1995). Who's Who in Nazi Germany. New York: Routledge. ISBN 978-0-41511-888-0.
- Zentner, Christian; Bedürftig, Friedemann (1991). The Encyclopedia of the Third Reich. New York: MacMillan Publishing. ISBN 0-02-897500-6.
