= Lothar Salinger =

Politically engaged German worker (1919–1943)

Lothar Salinger (8 May 1919 – 4 March 1943) was a politically engaged German worker and part of the Jewish youth movement in Berlin, who became a resistance activist and an associate of Herbert Baum. He was executed by guillotine at the Plötzensee execution facility. His fiancée was also an anti-Hitler activist but she managed to outlive the régime, living "illegally" (unregistered) in Berlin, and some years later emigrated to California where she married Dr. Gerhard Salinger, Professor of Middle Eastern Studies at Berkeley and brother to her murdered fiancé.

== Life and death ==
Lothar Salinger was born in Berlin, the son of a businessman. On leaving school he worked, between 1936 and 1938, in his father's business. He became politically engaged in or before 1935, the year in which he joined the left-wing Jewish youth association "Habonim". After 1939 Salinger took work as a gardener, in the transport sector and in road building. In July 1941 he was conscripted for forced labour in Berlin-Köpenick. In 1941 he was sent to work at the Vogel Cables factory in Friedrichshagen Street.

In 1940 Salinger began to take part in the activities of the anti-government resistance group headed up by the former "Young Communists" official, Herbert Baum. The group tends to be identified in subsequent sources as the "Herbert Baum Group", although that implies a level of coherence and organisation that may not have been apparent. Another group member was Salinger's fiancée, Ursel Ehrlich. After the German government suddenly repudiated the Germany's non-aggression agreement with the Soviet Union in June 1941, members of the Baum Group attempted to contribute to the military defeat of Germany, and hence of National Socialism. This meant complementing from inside Germany the external efforts of the anti-German "allied powers", of which by far the most significant from the perspective of Berlin in 1941 was the Soviet Union. That meant engaging in acts of sabotage on the home front such as producing and distributing anti-war leaflets and manifestoes. A more widely reported action was the arson attack and leafleting blitz carried out on 18 May 1942 by members of the group against the government's ironically named "Soviet Paradise" in Berlin's Lustgarten park. The physical damage caused seems to have been minimal, but the government Propaganda Ministry was quick to seize on the opportunity to label government's opponents as Communists and Jews intent on securing Soviet victory in the war. The incident was also the trigger for a wave of arrests across Berlin of anti-government activists, most of whom in this instance were communist or Jewish or both.

In the aftermath of the attack on the "Soviet Paradise" exhibition 31 people were arrested. They were all found guilty of high treason. Only 6 were determined to have participated in the arson attack and the court seems to have accepted that most of those convicted were not even present. Lothar Salinger was arrested by the security services on 15 July 1942. The trial of at least 12 of Herbert Baum's associates took place before the special People's Court in Berlin on Thursday 10 December 1942. Conviction and sentencing followed on the same day. Nine of those convicted were sentenced to death. (Note: Alongside Lothar Salinger, the eight convicts sentenced to die were Heinz Rotholz, Siegbert Rotholz, Heinz Birnbaum, Helmut Neumann, Hella Hirsch, Hanni Meyer, Marianne Joachim and Hildegard Löwy. Herbert Baum himself had already, by this time, died under torture in Moabit Prison.) The others sentenced at the trial on 10 December 1942 received lengthy prison terms. They were all young – aged between 20 and 23. They were all determined by the authorities to be members of the "Herbert Baum Group". They were all identified as Jewish.

Lothar Salinger was executed at the Plötzensee execution facility on 4 March 1943.
