= Heinz Joachim =

German music student and anti-government resistance group member (1919–1942)

- Born: Heinz Günther Joachim; 13 December 1919; Berlin, Weimar Republic
- Died: 18 August 1942 (aged 22); Plötzensee Prison, Berlin, Nazi Germany
- Cause of death: Execution
- Occupation: Music student
- Known for: Anti-Nazi resistance
- Spouse: Marianne Joachim (m. 1941)

Heinz Günther Joachim (13 December 1919 – 18 August 1942) was a German music student. He played the clarinet. In 1941 he became involved with an anti-government resistance group. He was arrested at work on 22 May 1942 and murdered/executed at Plötzensee Prison on 18 August 1942.

Heinz Joachim and his family were Jewish. His wife and his father were also killed under government auspices during the Hitler years. His mother and four younger brothers survived the Holocaust, however. After 1945 they moved to Uruguay and, supported by relatives there, started new lives.

== Life ==
Heinz Günther Joachim was born in Berlin a few months after the end of the First World War, the first-born of his parents' five sons. Alfons Joachim (1895–1944), his father, worked in Berlin for Einheitspreis AG as a department head. Alfons Joachim came originally from Kurnik (Posen) which between 1793 and 1919 had been in Prussia/Germany. Alfons Joachim married Heinz Joachim's mother, born Anna Emilie Luise Nehle (1893–1988) in 1919. She converted to Judaism in 1927.

In or before 1940 Heinz Joachim became a student at the "Berliner Jüdischen Musikschule Hollaender", an academy that had been set up by the disseized heirs of Gustav Hollaender and his family in the wake of the 1935 renaming and "aryanization" of the Hollaenders' Stern Music Conservatory. At the "Musikschule" he found himself at the circle of a wide circle of musician friends including Marianne Prager (whom he subsequently married) and Lothar Salinger. Another who became a close friend was Siegbert Rotholz, a leading figure in Berlin's Zionist youth movement.

After the events of 8/9 November 1938 state mandated anti-semitism had become strikingly less constrained. The three friends were all Jewish, and during 1940 they were sent as "forced labourers" to work at the vast Siemens electro-engineering plant ("Siemens-Elektromotorenwerk") in Berlin-Spandau. The so-called "Department 133" of the plant was in effect as "special Jewish section", where approximately 500 were employed. Initially they were still able to continue as students at the " Holländer Musikschule", but that ceased to be the case during 1941. It was also during 1941, on 22 August, that Heinz Joachim and Marianne Prager were married.

One of their co-workers in the "Jewish section" at Siemens was an electrician called Herbert Baum. Baum was a few years older than most of their friends and colleagues. At around the time of their marriage Heinz and Marianne Joachim became members of what came to be known as the Baum group, a circle of forced labourers living in Berlin. Joachim got hold of a copying machine which the group could use to produce political pamphlets. Sources comment on how young most of the group members were. Most were Jewish and politically inclined towards leftwing politics. Some members were living "underground" – unregistered with any town hall – in order to make it harder for the authorities to track them. The Joachims shared a small apartment along the Rykestraße in the Prenzlauer Berg quarter. It was frequently used for meetings by the "Prenzlauer Berg Antifascist Group" ("Antifaschistischen Gruppe im Prenzlauer Berg Berlin" / AGiP) – a name by which Baum's group identified itself. Although discussion topics ranged widely, one of the things that the friends discussed with increasing intensity was how they might undermine the Nazi government.

The Baum group's most highly publicised political action was an arson attack carried out on 18 May 1942 against the "Soviet Paradise" exhibition in Berlin's "Lustgarten" pleasure park. The objective of the exhibition was to demonstrate to the people the "poverty, misery, depravity and need" that were features of life in the "Jewish Bolshevist Soviet Union". The arson attack inflicted relatively little physical damage on the exhibition, which re-opened the next day, but news of it had a more lasting impact.

Herbert Baum and Heinz Joachim were arrested at work on 22 May 1942. Further arrests followed. Just over two weeks later Marianne Joachim was arrested at the home the couple had shared.

Heinz Joachim was executed at Berlin's Plötzensee Prison on 18 August 1942. Marianne Joachim was executed at Plötzensee Prison on 4 March 1943. Alfons Joachim, the father of Heinz, was the subject of a denunciation in July 1944: he is known to have died on 4 December 1944 at the Sachsenhausen concentration camp. The mother of Heinz Joachim, Anna Emilie Luise Joachim, was still alive in 1945, as were his four younger brothers. In 1947 they emigrated together to Uruguay where his aunt had married a businessman called Viktor Friedheim. Friedheim owned a chocolate factory and was able to give the family survivors work and support.
