= Baum Group =

German anti-Nazi resistance group

The Baum Group was a German anti-Nazi resistance group in Berlin. The group's members were mostly Communist, Jewish, and young, with many being teenagers or young adults.

The group printed and distributed anti-Nazi literature and organized activities. Its members were executed for setting fire to Das Sowjetparadies (The Soviet Paradise), an anti-Soviet exhibit in Berlin's Lustgarten.

== Founding ==
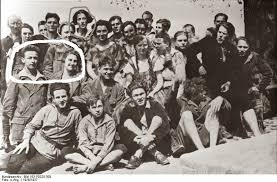
Herbert and Marianne Baum before they married

The Baum Group was founded by Herbert Baum in 1936, 1937 or 1938 depending on the source. Herbert Baum was active in the Communist Youth Federation (KJVD), and later the Communist Party of Germany.

Through his connections, Baum organized a group of like-minded individuals to undertake anti-Nazi activities. Most members of Baum's group were Jewish and young. The average age of the members was 22. Baum's wife, Marianne, was a central figure in the group. By 1938, the group had 100 members.

Herbert and Marianne Baum were ordered into forced labor at the Jewish department of the Siemens electric motors factory where they continued to recruit members.

== Activities ==
The Baum Group printed and distributed anti-Nazi literature and planned resistance activities and initiatives. Because Jews had limited access to typewriters at the time, non-Jewish members secretly typed materials while at work. Stenciled leaflets and other materials were made in Herbert and Marianne Baum's basement.

On May 18, 1942, the Baum Group and another anti-Nazi group set fire to Das Sowjetparadies (The Soviet Paradise), an anti-Soviet exhibit in Berlin's Lustgarten. Group members were caught by the Nazis. Herbert Baum was tortured to death in Moabit Prison, dying on June 11, 1942. The Gestapo reported his death as a suicide. His wife, Marianne, was executed in Plötzensee Prison on August 18, 1942. Other members were executed at Berlin-Plötzensee in 1943. After the arson attack, the Nazis also detained and executed 500 Berlin Jews. Most were executed quickly and others were murdered a short time later in prisons and concentration camps.

A memorial to the Baum Group stands in Weissensee, Berlin.

== Members ==
- Hans Adler
- Herbert Baum (1912–1942)
- Marianne Baum (1912–1942)
- Kurt Bernhard
- Heinz Birnbaum (1920–1943)
- Herbert Budzislawsky
- Hella Hirsch (1921–1943)
- Alfred Eisenstadter
- Edith Fraenkel
- Charlotte Holzer (1909–1980)
- Felix Heymann
- Hardel Heymann
- Alice Hirsch
- Hilda Jadamowitz (1916–1942)
- Hans Joachim
- Marianne Joachim (1922–1943)
- Martin Kochmann (1912–1943)
- Sala Kochmann (1912–1942)
- Hildegard Löwy (1922–1943)
- Gerd Meyer
- Hanni Meyer (1921–1943)
- Herbert Meyer
- Helmut Neumann (1922–1943)
- Suzanne Wesse (1914–1942)
- Heinz Rotholz (1922–1943)
- Siegbert Rotholz (1922–1943).
- Lothar Salinger (1920–1943)
- Werner Steinbrink
- Irene Walter
