= Sala Kochmann =

Sala Rosenbaum Kochman (June 7, 1912- August 18, 1942) was a Jewish resistance fighter during World War II. She was an early member of the Baum Group, a collaborative anti-Nazi resistance organization.

Kochman was executed by the Nazis in 1942 in Berlin for her activities.

== Life ==
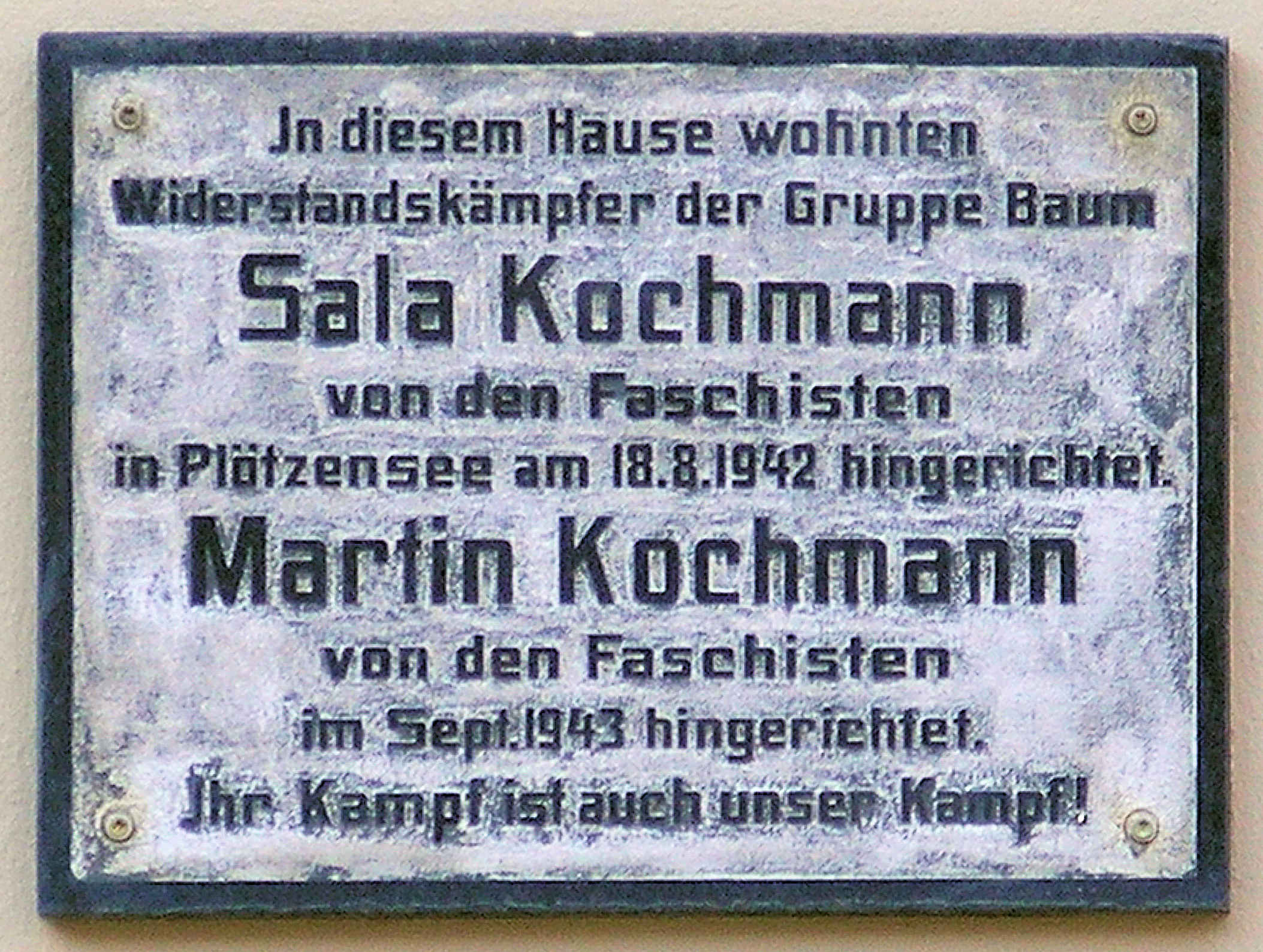
Memorial plaque - Sala and Martin Kochmann

Kochmann was born Sala Rosenbaum in Rzeszow, Poland. She later lived in Berlin, studied to be a kindergarten teacher, and worked at a nursery school.

Sala married Martin Kochmann in 1938.

Kochmann was one of the first members of the Baum Group, an anti-Nazi resistance group founded by Herbert Baum. The group printed and distributed anti-Nazi literature and organized activities.

On May 18, 1942, Sala and Martin Kochmann and other members of the Baum Group along with members of another anti-Nazi group set fire to Das Sowjetparadies (The Soviet Paradise), an anti-Soviet exhibit in Berlin's Lustgarten. Sala Kochmann was arrested on May 23, 1942. She jumped out of the window of the police station and was taken to the Jewish hospital due to her injuries. While there, she relayed information to other group members via Charlotte Pach, a nurse and Baum Group member who worked at the hospital. Kochmann was taken to her trial on a stretcher.

== Death ==
Kochmann was sentenced to death on July 16, 1942, and executed at Plötzensee Prison in Berlin on August 18, 1942.
