= Hanni Meyer =

Hanni Lindenberger Meyer
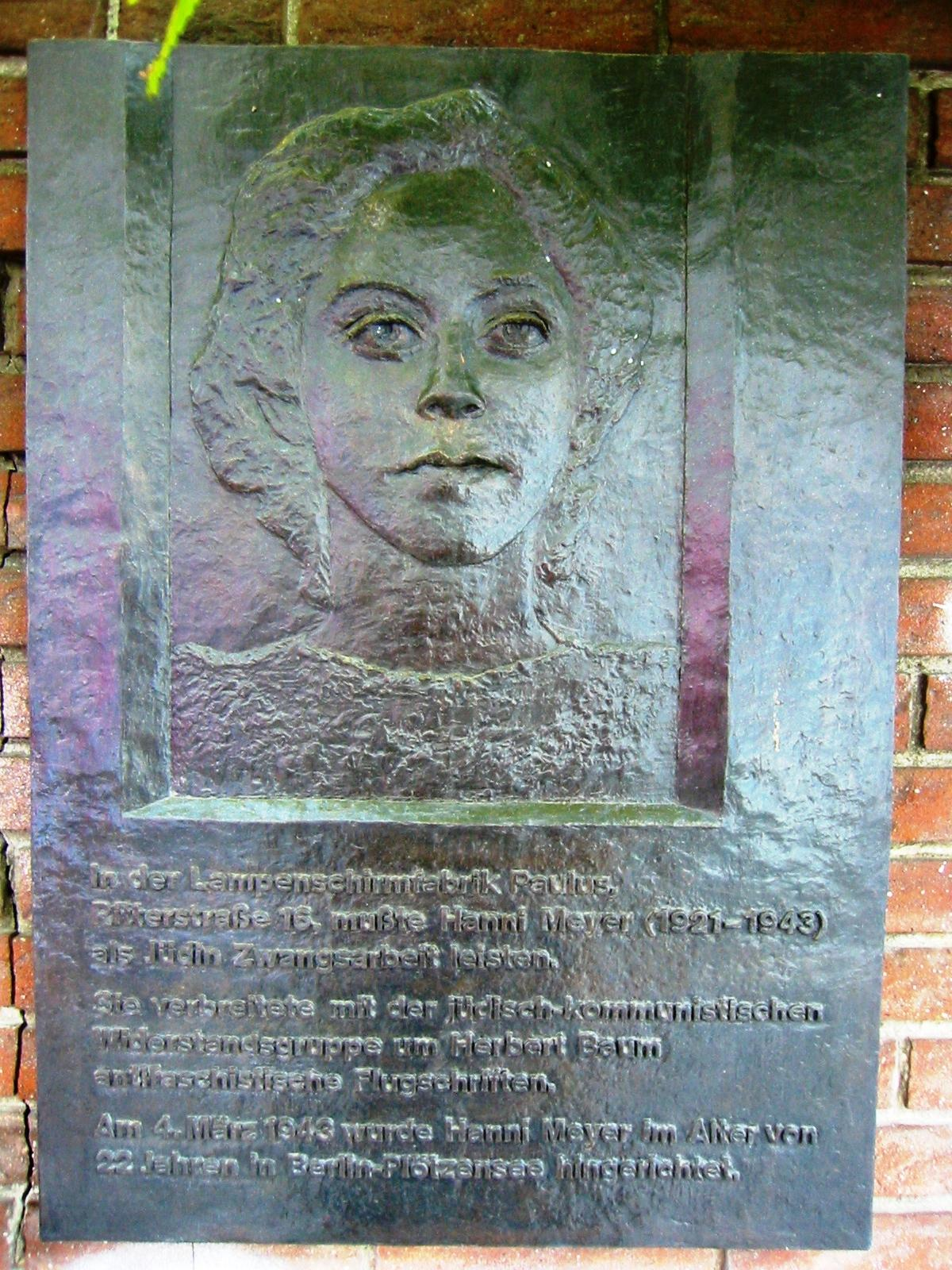
- Born: February 14, 1921; Berlin, Germany
- Died: March 4, 1943 (aged 22); Plötzensee Prison
- Cause of death: Execution via guillotine

Hanni Lindenberger Meyer (February 14, 1921 to March 4 1943) was a Jewish resistance fighter during World War II. She was a member of the Baum Group, a collaborative anti-Nazi resistance organization.

Meyer was executed by the Nazis in 1943 for her activities.

== Life ==
Meyer was born in Hanni Lindenberger in Berlin, Germany to Adolf and Dora Lindenberger. She had an older brother, Manfred (1914-2008).

After her schooling, Meyer trained in the millinery trade. She also prepared to become a kindergarten teacher, but was forced to halt her training due to anti-Jewish laws put in place by the Nazi party.

Meyer joined the Ring-Bund jüdischer Jugend, a Jewish youth group and was active in Jewish and political activities. In the 1930s, she joined the Baum group, a mostly Jewish anti-Nazi group led by Herbert Baum. The group printed and distributed anti-Nazi literature and organized activities.

Meyer was forced to work at the Paulus lamp-shade factory. She married Gerd Meyer, another member of the Baum group, on January 27, 1942. Gerd was a forced laborer at the Siemens factory in Berlin along with other members of the Baum Group including Herbert and Marianne Baum.

On May 18, 1942, the Baum Group and another anti-Nazi group set fire to Das Sowjetparadies (The Soviet Paradise), an anti-Soviet exhibit in Berlin's Lustgarten. Five members of the group, including Gerd Meyer, participated in the attack. After the attack, group members, including those who did not participate in the attack were pursued by the Nazis. Most were caught and executed. Using fake papers, Gerd and Hanni Meyer were able to escape using to Petershagen where they rented a cottage. Gerd was arrested on May 22, 1942 and Hanni was arrested on June 3. Gerd was executed on August 18. Hanni was convicted on December 10 and executed via guillotine on March 3, 1943. Her mother was murdered in Auschwitz the same year.

There is a Stolpersteine in Hanni Meyer's memory in Mitte district of Berlin.
