= Martin Kochmann =

Jewish resistance fighter during World War II

Martin Kochman (October 30, 1912- September 8, 1943) was a Jewish resistance fighter during World War II. He was an early member of the Baum Group, a collaborative anti-Nazi resistance organization.

Kochman was executed by the Nazis on September 8, 1943, at Berlin-Plötzensee prison.

== Life ==
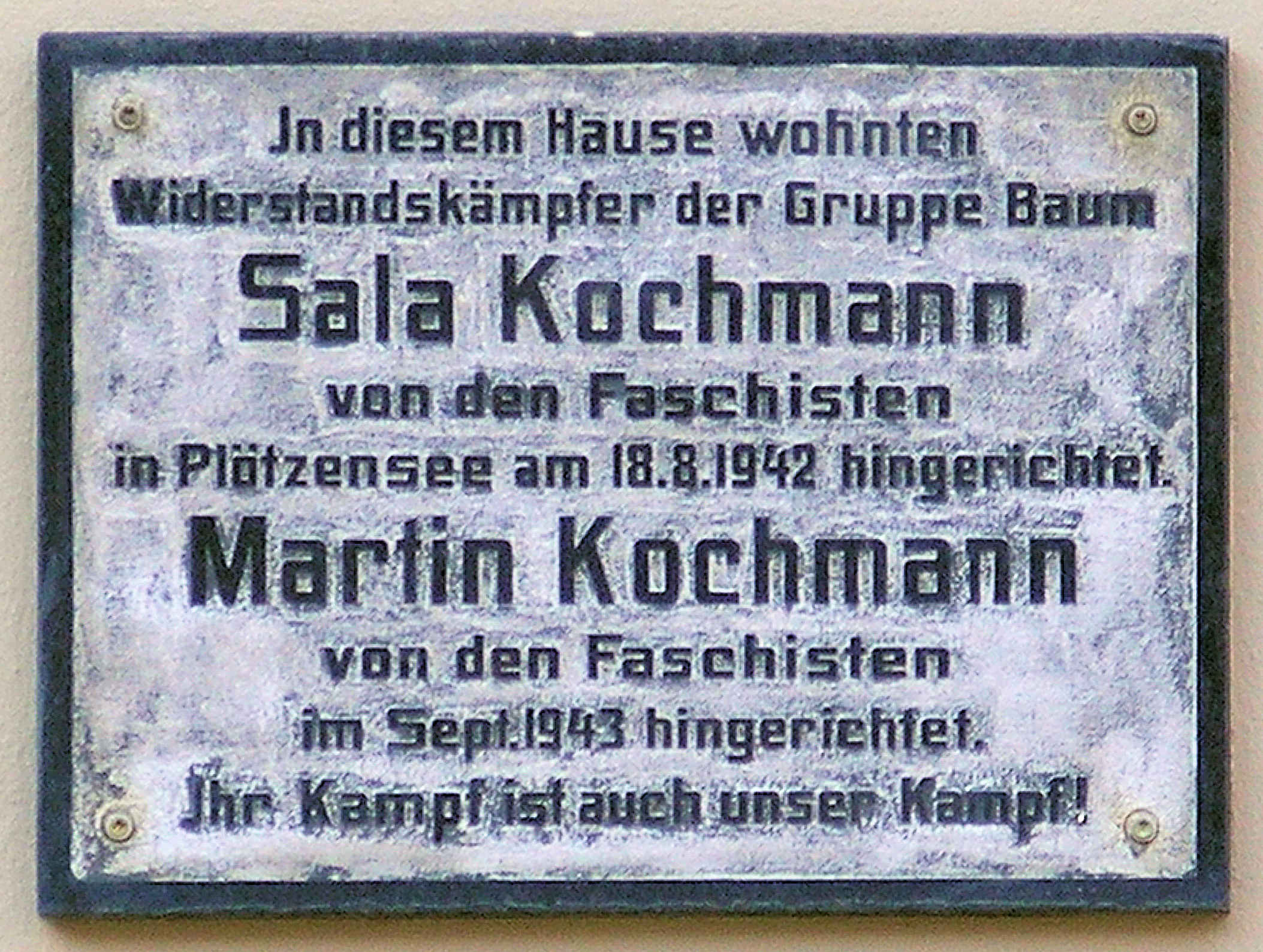
Memorial plaque - Sala and Martin Kochmann

Kochmann was born in Wongrowitz, a town in Poland. He moved to Berlin, Germany with his family in 1921. His father was a butcher and his mother was a seamstress. After his schooling, Kochmann completed a commercial apprenticeship.

Kochmann was Jewish. He joined the Communist Youth League of Germany with in 1933 along with some Jewish friends. In 1934, he was charged with illegal activities, but was released due to a lack of evidence.

Kochmann married Sala Rosenbaum in 1938.

Sala and Martin Kochmann were an early members of the Baum Group, an anti-Nazi resistance group founded by Herbert Baum. The group printed and distributed anti-Nazi literature and organized activities. Martin Kochmann was friends with Herbert Baum since childhood.

On May 18, 1942, Sala and Martin Kochmann and other members of the Baum Group along with members of another anti-Nazi group set fire to Das Sowjetparadies (The Soviet Paradise), an anti-Soviet exhibit in Berlin's Lustgarten.

Sala was arrested on May 23, 1942. She jumped out of the window of the police station and was taken to the Jewish hospital due to her injuries. While there, she relayed information to other group members via Charlotte Pach, a nurse and Baum Group member who worked at the hospital. Sala was taken to her trial on a stretcher. She was executed on August 18, 1942.

After the attack, Martin Kochmann fled and went into hiding. He was caught by the Gestapo on October 7, 1942, and was executed at Berlin-Plötzensee prison on September 8, 1943.
