= Suzanne Wesse =

French resistance fighter in Germany (1914–1942)

Suzanne Vasseur Wesse
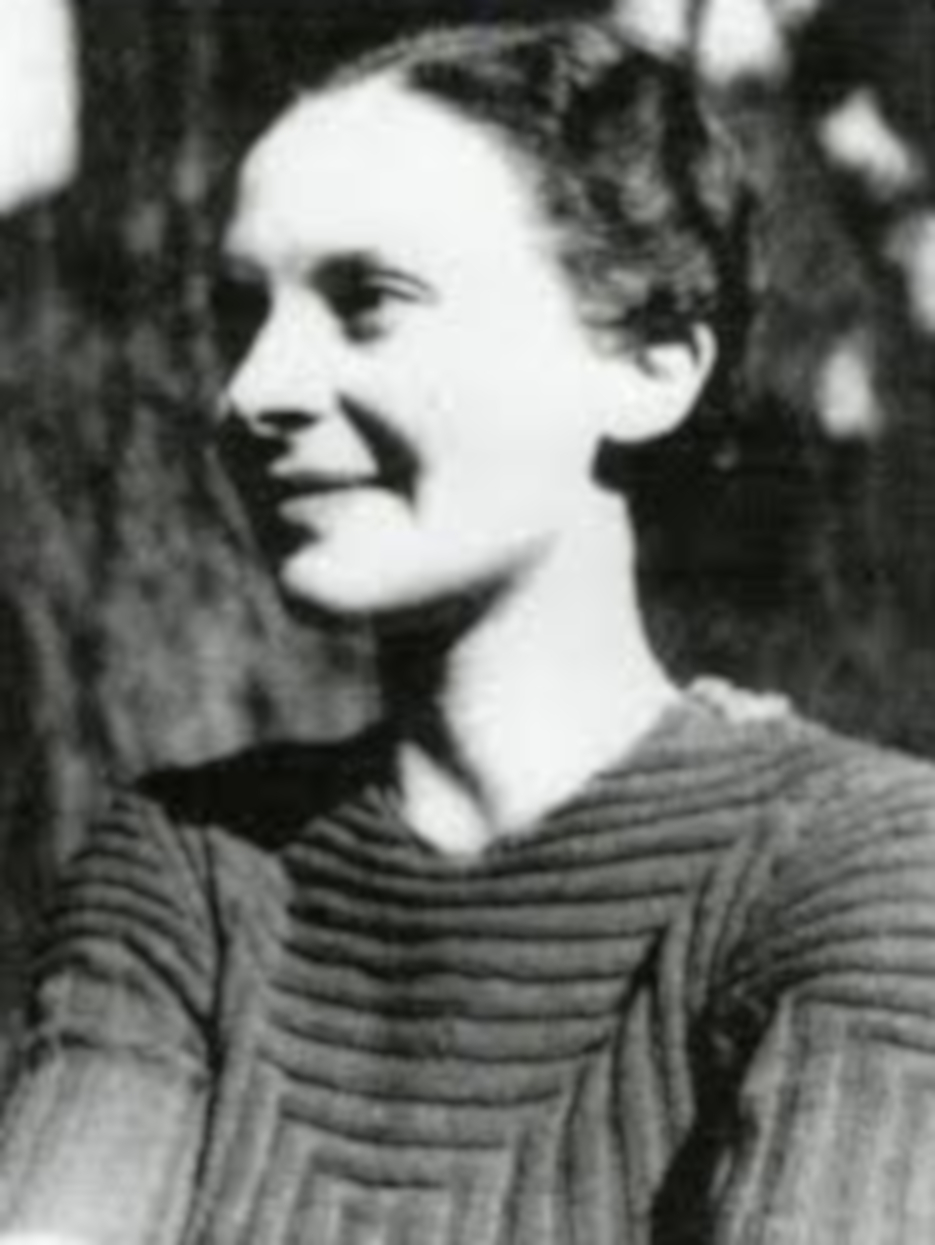
- Born: January 16, 1914; Calais, France
- Died: August 18, 1942 (aged 28); Plötzensee Prison
- Cause of death: Execution

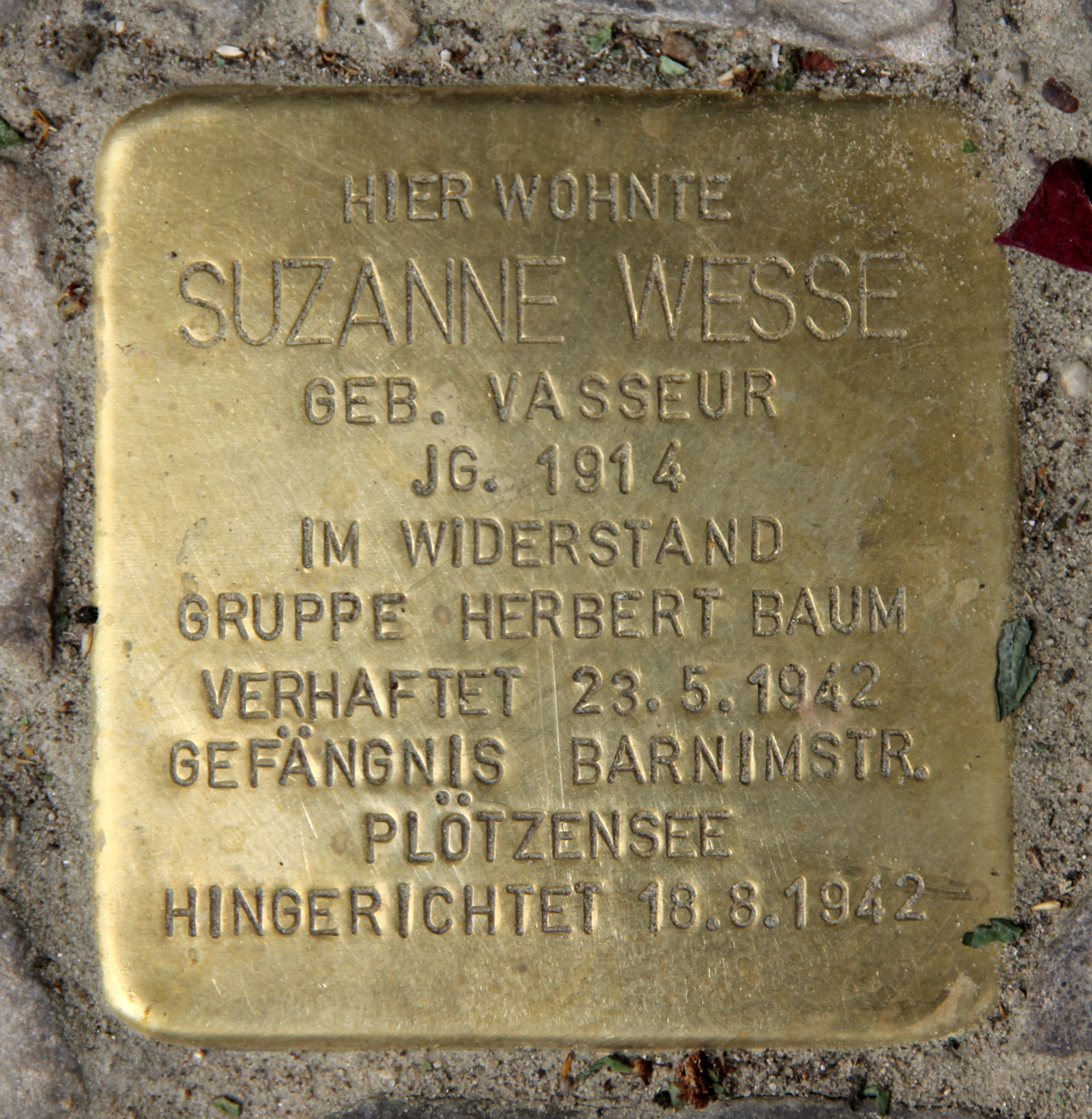
Stolpersteine

Suzanne Vasseur Wesse (January 16, 1914 – August 18, 1942) was a French-born member of the Baum Group, a collaborative anti-Nazi resistance organization, and was executed by the Nazis in 1942 for her activities.

== Life ==
Wesse was born Suzanne Vasseur in Calais, France. Her father owned a lace-making company. She had three brothers, Amand, Auguste and André. Suzanne attended school in England, Spain and Berlin.

In 1934, Suzanne worked at a Jewish-owned clothing company in Berlin where she met Richard Wesse, an engineer. Richard was half Jewish. The two married in 1936 and their daughter, Katharina, was born on April 15, 1937.

Suzanne Wesse worked as a freelance translator until 1937.

Wesse met Herbert Baum through her husband's cousin. Baum was the Jewish leader of the Baum Group, a communist-leaning anti-Nazi organization. The group printed and distributed anti-Nazi literature and organized activities. Wesse joined the group and helped to design, print, and distribute posters, pamphlets, and literature. She was one of just a few group members who were not Jewish.

When her brother August was arrested and imprisoned in Berlin, Suzanne visited him and distributed anti-Nazi materials to other prisoners. She also used her language skills to share information with them.

On May 18, 1942, Wesse and other members of the Baum Group, along with others from another anti-Nazi group, set fire to Das Sowjetparadies (The Soviet Paradise), an anti-Soviet exhibit in Berlin's Lustgarten. Suzanne and her husband were arrested by the Gestapo on May 23, 1942. Richard was released after three weeks. Suzanne was sentenced to death and was executed at Plötzensee Prison on August 18, 1942. There is a Stolperstein in her memory in Berlin.
