= Hildegard Jadamowitz =

Communist activist and a member of the German resistance (1916–1942)

Hildegard Jadamowitz (February 12, 1916, Berlin – August 18, 1942, Plötzensee Prison) was a German communist activist and a member of the German resistance against National Socialism.

She joined the League of Young Communist League of Germany at the age of 15. After she was arrested and released by the police, she joined a resistance movement led by Herbert Baum, and there met her future companion, Werner Steinbrinck. With his help, she wrote flyers and tried to establish links with other resistance organizations, in order to create an "anti-fascist front". In May 1942, she took part in an arson attack on the anticommunist and antisemitic propaganda The Soviet Paradise, organized in the Lustgarten by the NSDAP. The attack caused minor damage, but a large number of members of the group were arrested. Jadamowitz was arrested, sentenced to death on July 16, 1942, by the Volksgerichtshof and executed on August 18.
