= Hella Hirsch =

Jewish resistance fighter during World War II (1921–1943)

Hella Hirsch

Hella Hirsch (6 March 1921 - 4 March 1943) was a Jewish resistance fighter during World War II. She was a member of the Baum Group, a collaborative anti-Nazi resistance organization.

Hirsch was executed for her role on in the Baum Group's arson attack against an anti-Soviet exhibition in Berlin.

== Life ==
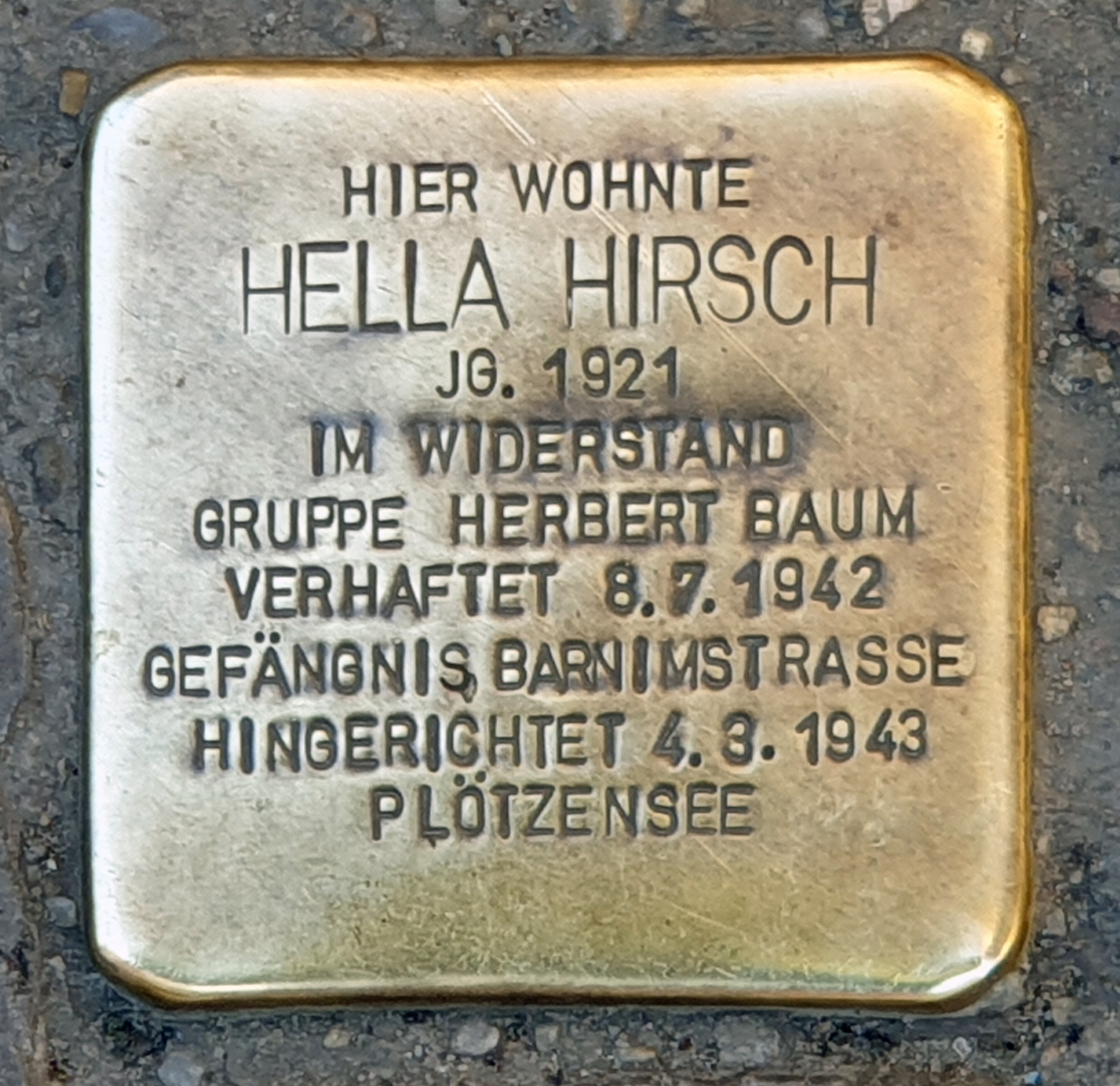
Stolperstein (stumbling block), Hella Hirsch, Auguststraße 49A, Berlin-Mitte, Germany

Hirsch was born in Poznań, Poland. Her father was a transport worker and her mother was a housewife. She attended Margarethen-Lyceum School after which she attended Jewish middle school for one year. She went on to study commerce at the firm of Zeidler and Remark from 1937-1939. Hirsch worked as a receptionist for local doctor, Fritz Hirschfeld.

Hirsch was a member of Ring, Bund Deutsch-Jüdischer Jugend (Ring Association of Jewish Youth), a Jewish Social organization that was forced to disband in 1937. The group's leader was Judith Kozminski.

Hirsch was forced by the Nazis to work at the IG Farben's Aceta chemical works in Berlin-Rummelsburg starting in June 1941. Through Judith Kozminski, Hirsch connected with Herbert Baum, a Jewish man active in the resistance movement. Hirsch joined Baum's resistance group with her sister, Alice.

On 18 May 1942 the Baum Group and another anti-Nazi group set fire to Das Sowjetparadies (The Soviet Paradise), an anti-Soviet exhibit in Berlin's Lustgarten. Group members were caught by the Nazis. Most were executed quickly and others were murdered a short time later in prisons and concentration camps. Hirsch was arrested on 8 July 1942 and executed in Berlin-Plötzensee on 4 March 1943.
