= Graffunder =

Graffunder is a surname. Notable people with the surname include:

- Carl Graffunder (1919–2013), American architect
- Heinz Graffunder (1926–1994), German architect
