= Hildegard Löwy =

Jewish German office worker involved in anti-Nazi resistance (1922–1943)

- Hildegard Löwy in 1941
- Born: 1922; Berlin, Germany
- Died: 4 March 1943 (aged 20–21); Plötzensee Prison, Berlin, Germany
- Occupation: office worker
- Known for: anti-Nazi activism
- Parent(s): Erich Löwy; Käte Igel

Hildegard Löwy (b.1922 - 4 March 1943) was a Jewish German office worker who became involved in anti-Nazi resistance. She was guillotined at Plötzensee Prison.

== Life ==
Hildegard Löwy was born in Berlin. She grew up with her parents and her younger sister, Eva, at the family home alongside the city's Luitpoldstrasse. Erich Loewy, her father, had participated in the First World War as a frontline soldier and, not withstanding the family's Jewish provenance, could not bring himself to leave Germany with his family despite the progressive intensification of state mandated antisemitism after 1933. As a child she was involved in a tram accident in which she lost an arm. After that she was dependent on a prosthesis in place of her right arm. Löwy enrolled at junior school locally when she was six moving on to a Jewish middle school when she was ten. There was at least one more enforced change of school, and by the time she passed her school leaving exams (Abitur) in 1940 she had been obliged to move to the Jewish Senior School in the Wilsnacker Strasse, which had become the only Jewish school that was still open. At this point, as the only female in her cohort of eleven children, she was regarded as an exceptionally promising pupil.

Passing the Abitur would normally have been expected to open the way to a university-level education. On leaving school Löwy progressed to the Jewish community's "Academy for Applied Graphic Arts" ("Schule für Gebrauchsgraphik und Dekoration"). Nine months later, on 22 April 1942, the academy was closed down by order of the authorities. With effect from 2 April 1941 Löwy had already taken a job as an office assistant, and on 13 July 1942 she took an office job with "Wolfgang Schulz", a firm with its premises in Berlin's Kulmacherstrasse.

Despite the obvious dangers involved she engaged actively in the Zionist movement. Between 1937 and 1938 she was a member of the Hashomer Hatzair group. A local group leader, Ellen Schwarz, remembered that Löwy had wanted to study Medicine at the University of Jerusalem. The necessary papers were refused her, however, on account of her handicap. The doctor responsible for authorising her admission to the necessary Hakhshara programme rejected her application because "only healthy young people" could be allowed to emigrate to Palestine. A few years earlier it might have been possible for her parents to finance an alternative emigration route for their daughter, but by this time restrictions in Germany on Jewish employment and business opportunities had left them impoverished, and restrictions on the export of currency would in any case have blocked such a move under most circumstances.

In the spring of 1941, she met Heinz Joachim, and through him Marianne Joachim. With their friend Lothar Salinger she joined the "Joachim Group". The group appears to have been a fractious one and, following ructions, in February 1942, leadership of it passed to Sala Kochmann. Hildegard Löwy engaged in the group's political discussions, and urged the broadening of its scope to include presentations on more academic topics, but other group members were not supportive of that idea. Löwy also became associated with the circle of friends around the electrician Herbert Baum. A number of the people in this circle were directly associated with the underground (because illegal since 1933) residuum of the old Communist Party. True to her Zionist commitments and pacifist beliefs, Löwy was not a communist, but in the words of one source she nevertheless accepted that a victory for Communism "would provide a better opportunity for Jews to obtain equal rights". In the context of later development, the people who were socially involved with Herbert Baum, found themselves identified by the Gestapo as a coherent anti-government group. For most purposes it seems to have been a more circle of like-minded friends than an organised conspiracy. There is, however, mention of involvement with sticking posters to walls and distributing leaflets that not merely opposed the Nazi government but also called for an end to the war.

On 15 July 1942 Löwy was arrested by the Gestapo at ten in the morning. The arrest came in the wake of an arson attack on an exhibition held between 8 May and 21 June 1942 in Berlin's Lustgarten. Germany's Nazi government was not completely without its own somewhat ponderous sense of fun, and the goal of the ironically named Soviet Paradise exhibition, which according to official statistics, was visited by 1.3 million people, was to show "poverty, misery, depravity and need" of the nations in the Soviet Union under Jewish-bolshevik rule and thus to justify the war against the Soviet Union. The arson attack itself took place on 18 May 1942 and reportedly did little damage to the exhibition, but after some months it had been used to justify to the arrest of a relatively large number individuals, identified as members of the "Baum-Group". Of those arrested, at least 33 would be executed. There is no suggestion that Hildegard Löwy herself had not been involved in the arson attack on the exhibition in the park. She was one of the first to be arrested, was taken to the "Investigatory penitentiary" at Berlin-Moabit.

Although they were living together, few people were more surprised by Löwy's arrest than her partner, Georg Israel (1921–1944). The two had come across one another in 1939 when the school they both attended had been closed down following the Kristallnacht pogrom and they had both transferred to the city's last surviving Hebrew school. They had moved in together shortly after meeting, but for reasons which invite several possible interpretations Löwy had never told her lover about her involvement with the people who organised the arson attack.

She remained in the Moabit penitentiary for nearly half a year before facing trial. Anticipating that she would be condemned to death, on 2 December 1942 she made a desperate escape attempt, knotting sheets together and attaching one end to a window from which she had removed the glass. The attempt, which was complicated by her physical handicap, failed. The knotted sheets were discovered and she was removed to a special "calming down cell" (Beruhigungszelle). Hildegard Löwy's trial took place on 10 December 1942 before the "second senate" of the special "People's Court" which Chancellor Hitler had set up back in 1934 in order for the government to be able to deal with "political offences" without recourse to the traditional justice system. She was among the eleven prisoners to face the court and be found guilty that day. Eight of the eleven, including Hildegard Löwy were condemned to death. The sentence was carried out at the jail on 4 March 1943.
