= Marianne Joachim =

Jewish German resistance activist (1921–1943)

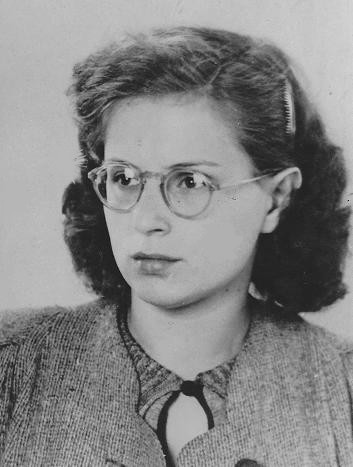
- Born: Marianna/Marianne Prager; 5 November 1921; Berlin, Weimar Republic
- Died: 4 March 1943 (aged 21); Plötzensee Prison, Berlin, Nazi Germany
- Cause of death: Execution by guillotine
- Occupations: Child care professional Forced labourer Resistance activist
- Spouse: Heinz Joachim (1919–1942)
- Parent(s): Georg Prager (1890–1943/4); Jenny Petersdorff (1886–1943/4)

Marianne Joachim (born Marianna/Marianne Prager; 5 November 1921 – 4 March 1943) was a Jewish German resistance activist during the Nazi years. She was executed at Plötzensee on 4 March 1943 following an arson attack the previous summer on the party propaganda department's (ironically named) "Soviet Paradise" exhibition in Berlin's "Lustgarten" pleasure park.

== Life ==
Marianne Prager grew up in Berlin. Georg Prager, her father, was a building worker. After successfully completing her schooling she trained as a child carer at the Jewish orphanage in the city centre (Gipsstraße). In Summer 1940 she was forced to give up this profession, however, when she was required by the authorities to relocate to Rathenow where she became a forced labourer in the agriculture sector.

Marianne Prager married Heinz Joachim on 22 August 1941. Both Marianne's parents had been classified by the authorities as Jewish. Her newly acquired father in law was also identified as Jewish although her new mother in law was not. Nevertheless, at the time of their marriage Heinz was also a forced labourer, in his case in the "Jews department" at a Siemens plant in Berlin-Spandau. Marianne Joachim's own forced labour regime had by this time brought her back to Berlin where she was working in Berlin-Wittenau at the Alfred Teves plant, which, before the war, had produced car parts.

One of Heinz Joachim's co-workers in the "Jews department" at Siemens was the electrician Herbert Baum. At around the time of their marriage Heinz and Marianne Joachim became members of what came to be known as the Baum group, a circle of forced labourers living in Berlin. Sources comment on how young most of the group members were. Most were Jewish and politically inclined towards leftwing politics. Some members were living "underground" – unregistered with any town hall – in order to make it harder for the authorities to track them. The Joachims shared a small apartment beside the Rykestraße in the Prenzlauer Berg quarter, which was frequently used for meetings by the "Prenzlauer Berg Antifascist Group" ("Antifaschistischen Gruppe im Prenzlauer Berg Berlin" / AGiP) – a name by which Baum's group identified itself. Although discussion topics ranged widely, one of the things that the friends discussed with increasing intensity was how they might undermine the Nazi government.

The Baum group's best known "political action" was an arson attack carried out on 18 May 1942 against the "Soviet Paradise" exhibition in Berlin's "Lustgarten" pleasure park. The objective of the exhibition was to demonstrate to the people the "poverty, misery, depravity and need" that were features of life in the "Jewish Bolshevist Soviet Union". The arson attack inflicted relatively little physical damage on the exhibition, which re-opened the next day, but news of it had a more lasting impact.

Herbert Baum and Heinz Joachim were arrested at work on 22 May 1942. Further arrests followed. Just over two weeks later Marianne Joachim was arrested at home on 9 June 1942.

== Letters home ==
During her time in prison Marianne Joachim was permitted to send and receive one letter per month. It is not clear whether this was the position throughout her period of incarceration, and it is not entirely clear to what extent she was constrained in what she was permitted to write. Letters that she wrote to her parents dated 15 November 1942, 15 December 1942, 17 January 1943 and 4 March 1943 have been made available online by the United States Holocaust Memorial Museum in Washington, D.C., and provide some indications of Marianne Joachim's state of mind during that time. She wrote a second letter on 4 March 1943, this time to her late husband's parents. In it she described the discovery that Heinz had already been executed – on 18 August 1942 – as the "cruelest blow of fate" (der "schwerste Schicksalsschlag"). She informed her parents-in-law of her impending execution and mentioned that she had had her remaining things sent to them. She believed – correctly – that Heinz's parents had a better chance of surviving the Nazi nightmare than her own parents. "I had my things sent to your address, dear Mom[-in-law], because I do not know for how much longer my [own] dear parents are still here" ("Meinen Nachlass habe ich an Deine Adresse gehen lassen, liebe Mama, weil ich doch nicht weiss, wie lange meine lieben Eltern noch hier sind"). There are also indications in her letters to her parents of surprise and relief that they had not (yet) been sent away.

== Death ==
Marianne Joachim was executed by decapitation at Berlin's Plötzensee penitentiary on 4 March 1943. Her younger sister, Ilse, had managed to escape to England before the war. Later in March 1943 Georg and Jenny Prager, her parents, were deported to Auschwitz. From there they were transported to the Theresienstadt concentration camp where they were killed. Heinz's father, Alfons Joachim, died towards the end of 1944 at the Sachsenhausen concentration camp. Anna Joachim, his mother, had not been classified as Jewish, however, and outlived the Nazi regime.
