= Reconstruction of the Berlin Palace =

German building reconstruction, 2013–2020

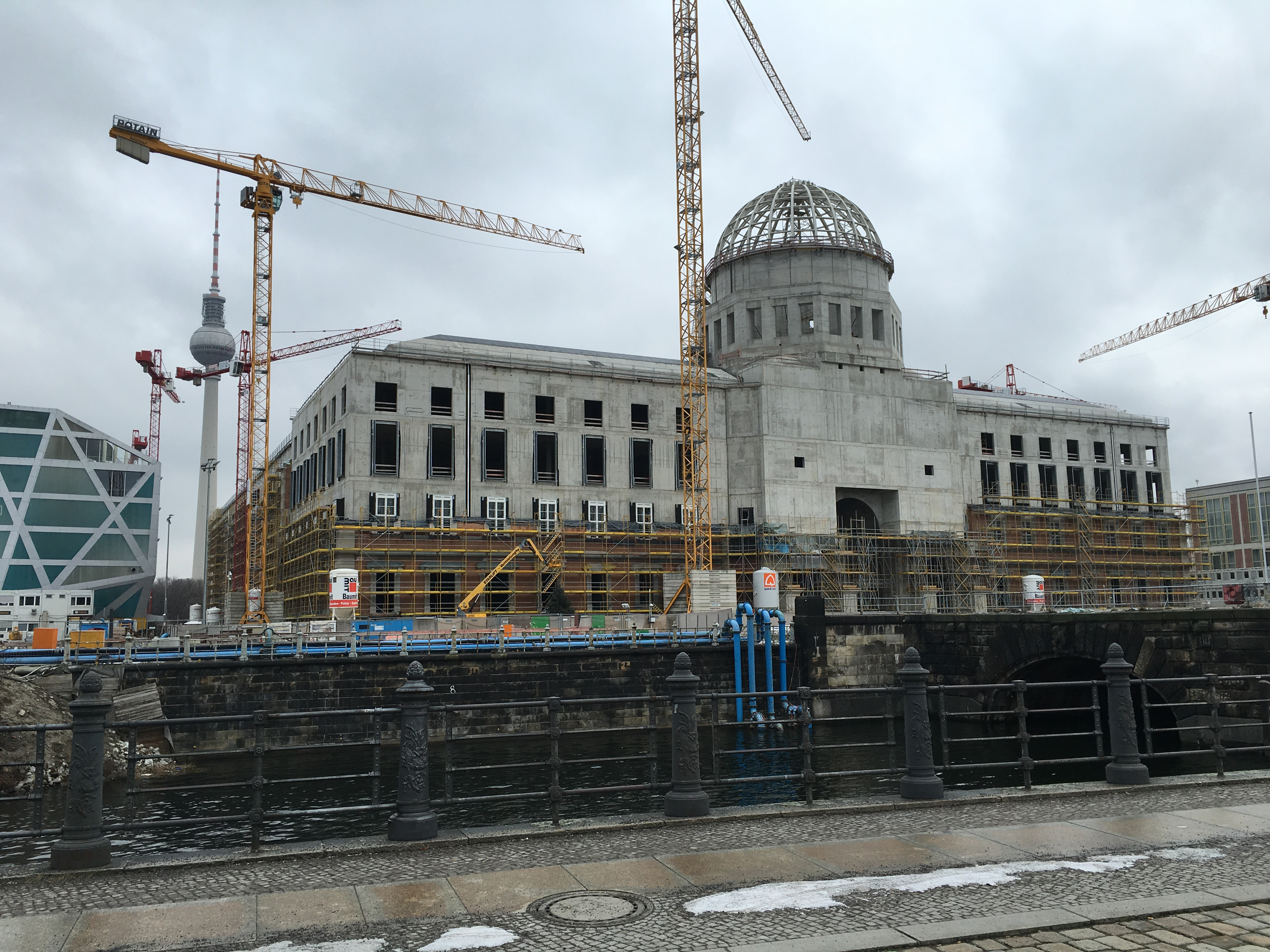
Construction in 2016

The reconstruction of the Berlin Palace took place from 2013 to 2020, incorporating donor-funded facades and components of the Baroque palace building. In 2002, the German Bundestag decided to partially rebuild the palace, which was demolished in 1950, thus continuing the restoration of Berlin's Historic Center. The three facades, which date back to 1713 and were designed by Andreas Schlüter, were reconstructed with the palace dome by Friedrich August Stüler from 1853. The project was widely discussed in society. According to the decision of the international expert commission in April 2002, the reconstructed palace serves as the seat of the Humboldt Forum.

== Background ==
The predominantly baroque historic building on this site had been demolished in 1950 by Walter Ulbricht of Socialist Unity Party of Germany (SED) following the massive damage during the bombing of Berlin in World War II. According to the developers, the new building will restore the historic Berlin cityscape at a significant location, which had since been "interrupted" during the years of East Germany (GDR), from 1976 onwards by the Palace of the Republic, at this site until its eventual demolition in 2008, almost two decades after reunification. The client and operator of the building is the Humboldt Forum Foundation in the Berlin Palace, the project was initiated and supported primarily by the private commitment of the Berlin Palace Sponsorship Association under Wilhelm von Boddien and donations of over 120 million euros.

The partially reconstructed new building of the palace houses the institution Humboldt Forum as a forum for culture, art and science. For this purpose, three of the baroque facades were rebuilt, the palace forum as a passageway as well as the east wing facing the Spree River are a simple new creation by the Italian architect Franco Stella. The dome including the cross, the round bay as the end of the east facade and three of the four sides of the Schlüterhof were also restored. The interiors, the two flanking small secondary domes above the west facade, and the spree and pharmacy wings from the Gothic and Renaissance periods were not reconstructed. All interiors are purely functional and simple in design, as is one side of the Schlüterhof. However, the interiors were planned to allow for later restoration. A rooftop restaurant is located next to the palace dome.

The foundation stone was laid on 12 June 2013, and the shell was completed in June 2015. In the summer of 2018, the facades were largely completed. The opening was to take place in three stages, the first of which was to coincide with the 250th anniversary of Alexander von Humboldt's birth on 14 September 2019. However, these plans had to be changed, so the first partial opening took place on 16 December 2020.

In memory of the intellectual legacy of Alexander and Wilhelm von Humboldt, the building is intended to bring together several museum collections from around the world - including those of the Dahlem museums - provide event spaces for science and culture, complement the Museum Island, provide information about the palace's history, and at the same time serve to restore a major point of reference in German history and the historic cityscape of Berlin-Mitte. It thus also ties in with the history of the palace as a cultural and scientific center after the 1918 revolution. During the Weimar Republic, the palace was the most visited museum in Berlin.

== Reconstruction ==
The Berlin Palace – Humboldt Forum Foundation (Die Stiftung Berliner Schloss – Humboldt Forum) awarded the contract for the shell construction work to Germany's largest construction group Hochtief Solutions. On 12 June 2013, the foundation stone for the Humboldt Forum was laid, and on 12 June 2015, the topping-out ceremony was held for the completed shell of the new building, including the roof truss. In the summer of 2018, the exterior facades were completed. The media praised the fact that the new building was one of the few large-scale projects in Germany, especially in Berlin, to remain on time and on budget until the summer of 2019. The new building would have opened on 14 September 2019.

The pre-opening should have taken place on 14 September 2019, and the regular operation of the building should have started at the end of 2019. Due to problems with heating and ventilation technology as well as fire protection, this had to be postponed. Individual parts of the building besides those already mentioned above include: the lantern with the gilded dome and the tower cross, the portal and the large decorative elements on the main facade. The cross on the dome was donated by the heiress of the founder of the Otto Group and bears a plaque with a corresponding reference. The metal lantern was recreated as a model by the sculptor Andreas Hoferick according to historical documents and developed and manufactured with the company Fittkau Metallgestaltung. It was raised to the roof on 29 May 2020.

== Reception ==
In particular, the modernist Spree facade by architect Franco Stella has been widely criticized. For example, art historian and architecture critic Nikolaus Bernau points out that "by not reconstructing the older components on the Spree facade, historical layers of Berlin are hidden and the Berlin Palace is idealized into a pure Baroque palace that it never was."
