= Palace of the Republic, Berlin =

Former seat of GDR parliament and cultural centre

Palace of the Republic
- Palast der Republik
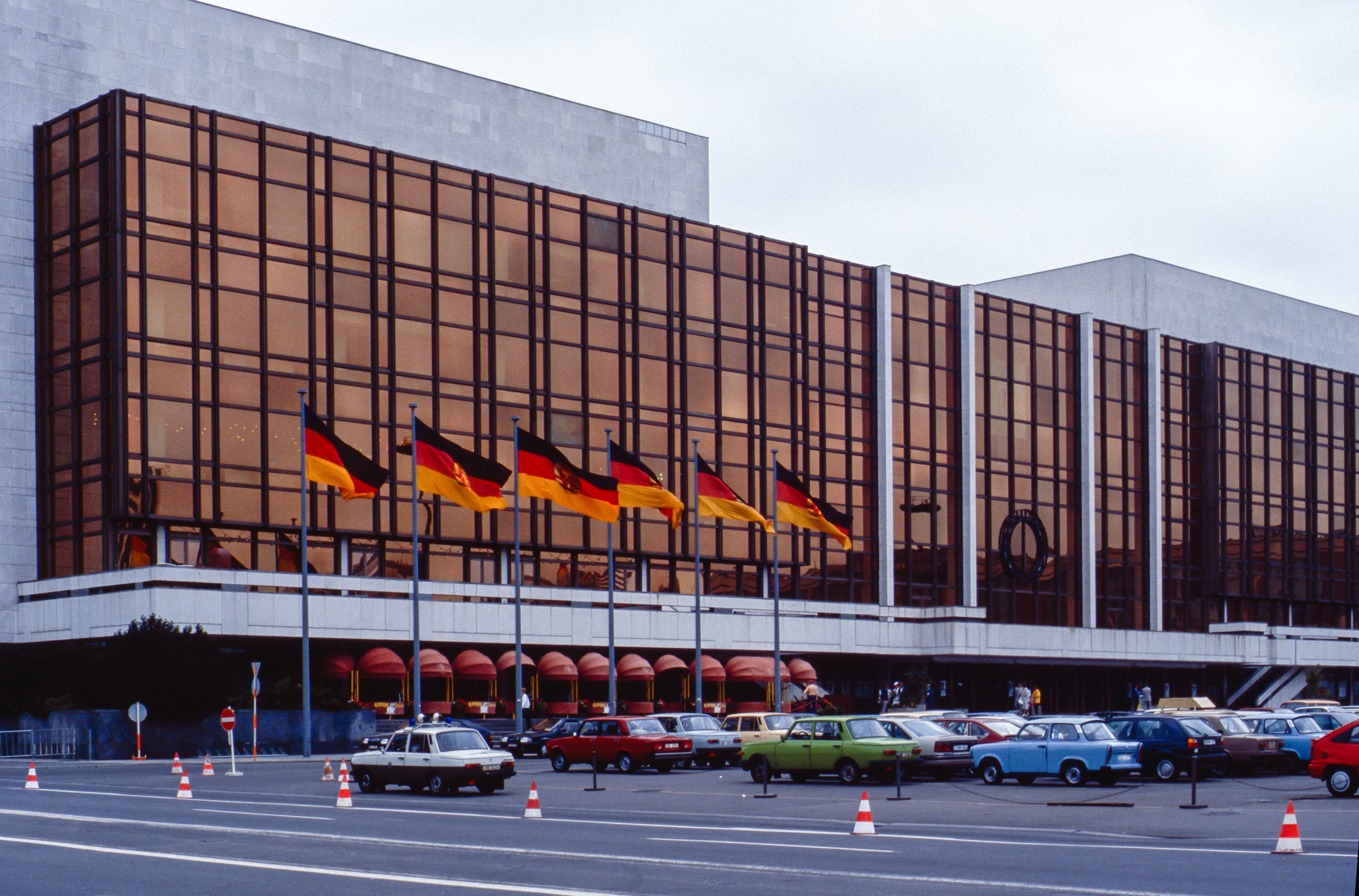
- The Palace of the Republic in July 1990, three months before German reunification

General information
- Status: Demolished
- Type: Cultural building, Parliamentary building
- Architectural style: Modernist
- Location: Mitte, Berlin, Germany
- Coordinates: 52°31′03″N 13°24′10″E
- Construction started: 1973
- Completed: 1976
- Inaugurated: 23 April 1976
- Demolished: 6 February 2006 – 2008
- Cost: 485–1,000 million East German marks

Design and construction
- Architects: Heinz Graffunder and the Building Academy of the German Democratic Republic

The Palace of the Republic (German: Palast der Republik, pronounced [paˈlast deːɐ ʁepuˈbliːk]) was a building in Berlin that hosted the Volkskammer, East Germany's supreme state organ of power, from 1976 to 1990.

Also known as the "People's Palace", it was located across the Unter den Linden from Museum Island in the Mitte area of East Berlin, on the site of the former Berlin Palace, which had been heavily damaged by Allied air raids and demolished in the 1950s. It was located between the Lustgarten and Schlossplatz, near the West Berlin border. The palace was completed in 1976 to house the Volkskammer, also serving various cultural purposes including two large auditoria, art galleries, a theatre, a cinema, 13 restaurants, five beer halls, a bowling alley, billiards rooms, a rooftop ice skating rink, a private gym with spa, a casino, a medical station, a post office, a police station with an underground cellblock, a fire station, an indoor basketball court, an indoor swimming pool, private barbershops and salons, public and private restrooms and a discothèque. In the early 1980s, one of the restaurants was replaced by a video game arcade for children of Volkskammer members and staff. The palace also had its own subway station, secure underground parking garage reserved for Central Committee members and a helipad reserved for Politburo members.

The palace became vacant after German reunification in 1990, then was closed for health and safety reasons because it contained 5,000-plus tonnes of asbestos, even though asbestos had been outlawed in construction in East Germany in 1968. In 2003, the Bundestag voted to demolish the palace; it was taken down between 2006 and 2008. It was replaced with a reconstruction of the Berlin Palace, began in 2013 and was completed in 2020.

== History ==
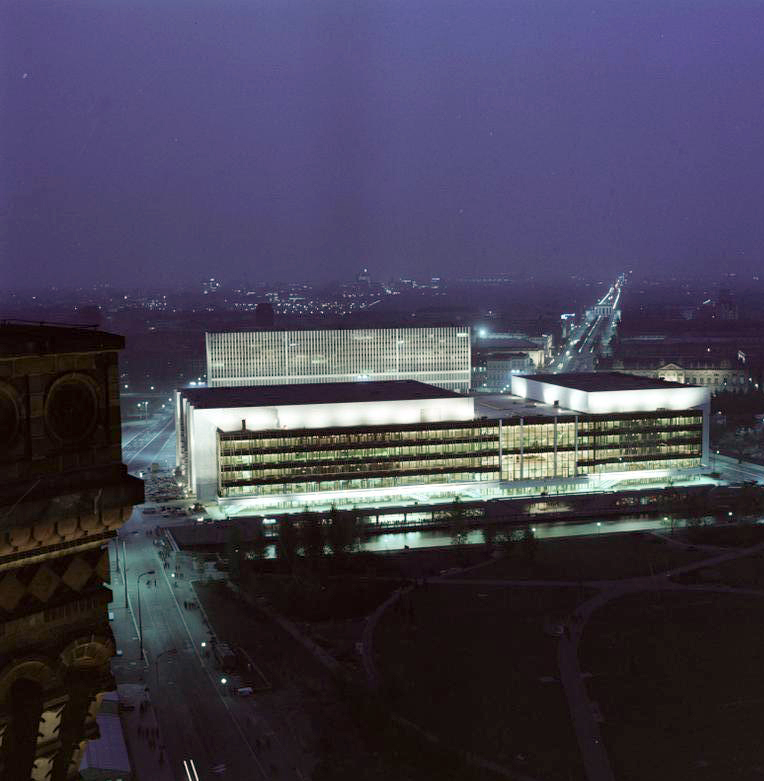
Eastern face of the Palace of the Republic at night in August 1976, shortly after its completion

=== Construction ===
Construction of the Palace of the Republic (German: Palast der Republik) began in 1973, with a cost stated at 485 million East German marks according to an internal list of Wolfgang Junker, the Minister of Construction, although other estimates suggest about 800 million to 1 billion marks. It was built on the site of the Berlin Palace (Stadtschloss), the former royal palace of Prussia, located on Museum Island in East Berlin, less than 2 kilometres (1.2 mi) along Unter den Linden from the West Berlin border at the Brandenburg Gate. The Berlin Palace had been controversially demolished in 1950 after suffering extensive damage during the Battle of Berlin in World War II, as the government had no budget in the post-war years for the restoration and it was viewed as a symbol of Prussian imperialism. The site was used as a parade ground and parking lot during the 1950s and 1960s until its designation as the location for a new building to seat the Volkskammer, the unicameral legislature of the German Democratic Republic (GDR), which was provisionally seated at the Langenbeck-Virchow-Haus at 58/59 Luisenstraße.

Considered a sister building to the Kulturpalast, the Palace of the Republic was designed by Heinz Graffunder with a facade of brown mirror-glass. The anti-elitist palace for the people housed theatres, art galleries, and cafes. The Communist elite was reduced to staging great celebrations and banquets at the Palace of the Republic. The Building Academy of the GDR (Bauakademie der DDR) approved of the design. It consisted of two massive outer blocks and a middle piece inserted between them, which together gave the building the shape of a cuboid with a length of 180 metres (590 ft), a width of 85 metres (279 ft), and a height of 32 metres (105 ft) which was based on that of the neighbouring buildings. The new building took up the eastern half of the plot while the western half was intended as a military parade ground, though tremors from the heavy vehicles were found to endanger the glass façade on the unstable grounds of Museum Island. Instead, the western half was used mainly as a parking lot and military parades were moved to Karl-Marx-Allee.

In addition to housing the Volkskammer, the palace was intended as a multiple-use structure influenced by the concepts of Palaces of Culture and People's Houses popular with socialist movements. Such cultural buildings were common not only in the Eastern Bloc, but examples can also be found in Belgium, France (Centre Georges Pompidou), the Netherlands and Sweden (House of Culture in Stockholm). In the young Soviet Union in particular, cultural centers became symbols of the new state power. The palace contained a large bowling alley at the lower level, from which the canal-side terrace along the River Spree could be accessed, and featured Brunswick lane equipment and a bar. The part of the palace open to the public featured numerous cameras for the surveillance of staff and visitors by Stasi officials. It was the first building in the GDR to feature a self-supporting steel skeleton and contained 5,000 tons of asbestos used for fire protection.

=== Seat of the Volkskammer ===
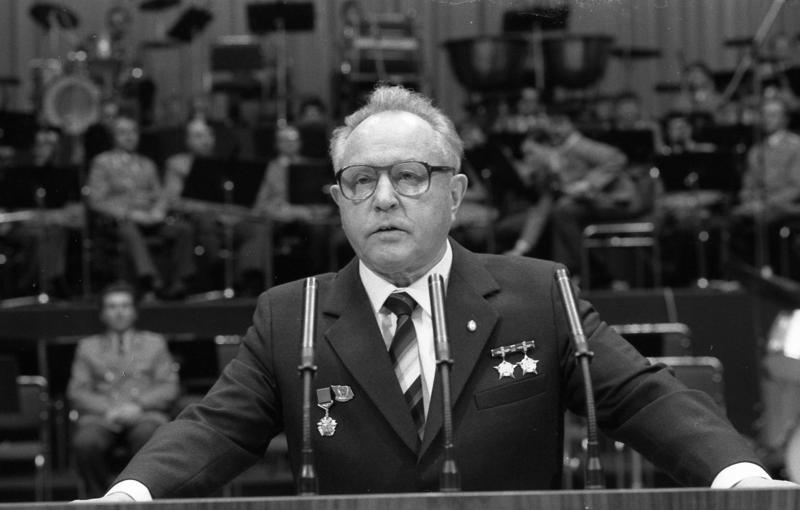
Erich Mielke, chief of the Stasi, speaking on 25 March 1983 as the club president of SV Dynamo who regularly held parties at the Palace of the Republic

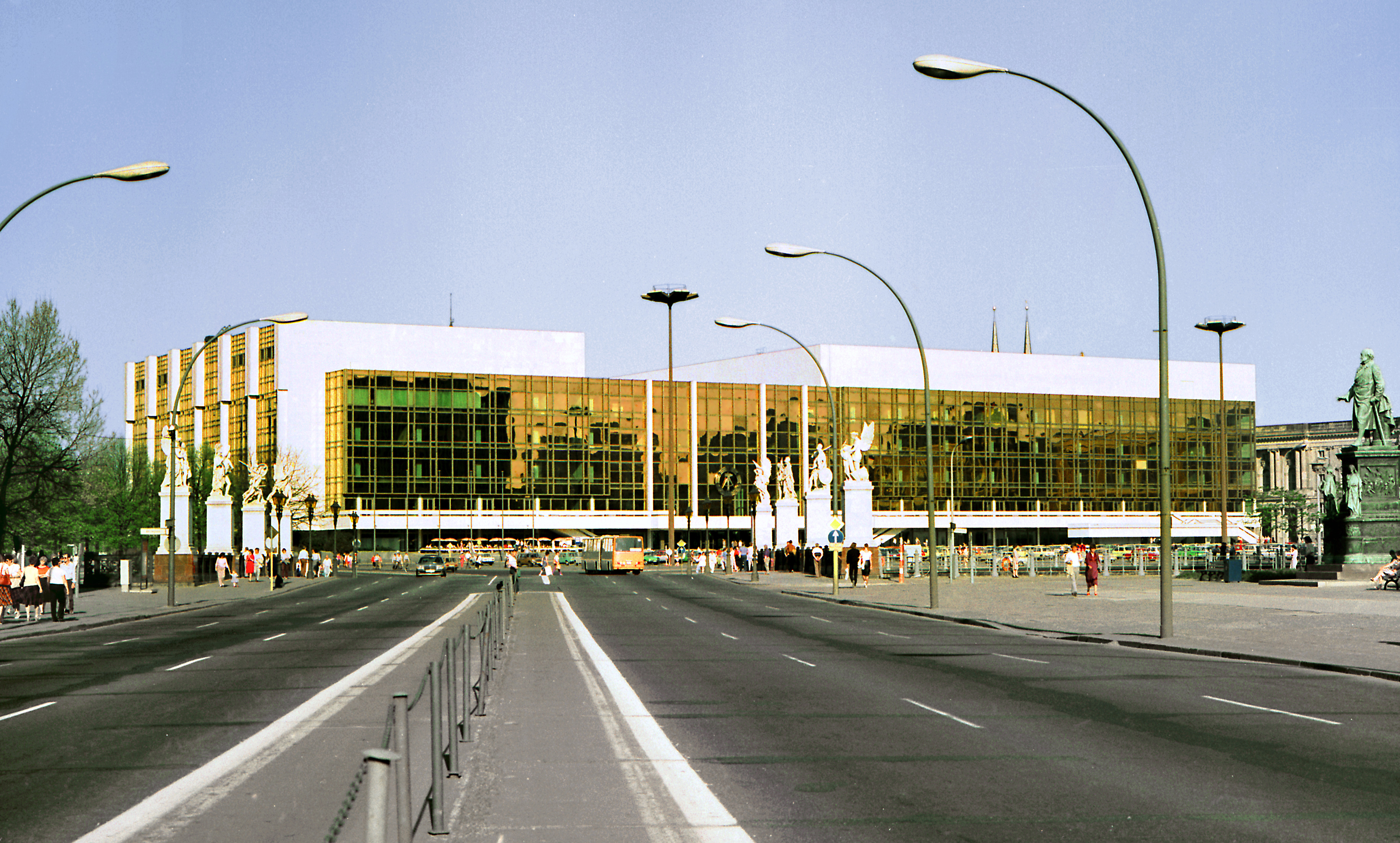
The front façade of the Palace of the Republic in 1986 from Unter den Linden

The palace was officially opened on 23 April 1976 and its facilities were opened to the public two days later.

Numerous important cultural, political, academic, and social events of the German Democratic Republic occurred at the palace after its opening. Events were held in its Great Hall, a large hexagonal room some 67 metres (220 ft) wide and 18 metres (59 ft) high. The Great Hall was notable for its versatility; lifting devices under the floor allowed for a stage of variable height and size. The surface area of the stage could therefore range anywhere from 170 to 1,000 square metres (1,800 to 10,800 sq ft), and the hall could seat between 1,000 and 4,500 attendants. Many editions of the GDR television entertainment program Ein Kessel Buntes were recorded in the Great Hall. Concerts of famous orchestras such as the Gewandhausorchester Leipzig under Kurt Masur, modern interpretations of classical music such as the Messiah of George Frideric Handel, and performances by Bulat Okudzhava (29 November 1976), Harry Belafonte (25 October 1983), Karel Gott (1983), 1986 with Dara Rolins and Heidi Janků, 1987) or of the rock-band Purple Schulz (21 January 1989). German electronic music group Tangerine Dream performed a concert recorded live at the palace on 31 January 1980 which also was Johannes Schmoelling's first live performance with the band. Erich Honecker, Willi Stoph and other members of the Central Committee were in attendance. The concert was unique in that Tangerine Dream was the first Western group who was allowed by the GDR government to play in East Berlin at the time and was dubbed "the performance behind the Iron Curtain". An album of this recorded concert was released titled Quichotte on East German record label Amiga, and later released to the rest of the world on Virgin Records six years later and renamed Pergamon. In October 1983, the West German rock star Udo Lindenberg was permitted to perform in concert at the palace. At the concert, Lindenberg did not sing one of his best-known songs, "Sonderzug nach Pankow" ("Special Train to Pankow"), which satirized East German leader Erich Honecker, as he was ordered not to play it under threat of arrest and imprisonment by the Stasi. Additionally, in April 1987, American Latin rock band Santana performed two concerts here.

The Socialist Unity Party (SED), the ruling party of the GDR, held party congresses at the palace and a state gala was held on the eve of the 40th (and final) anniversary of the GDR in October 1989, at which Soviet leader Mikhail Gorbachev was present. During the night of 22–23 August 1990, the Volkskammer decided in the palace on the accession of the GDR to the Federal Republic of Germany with effect from 3 October 1990, known as German reunification.

The palace had many nicknames in the Springer press in West Berlin and among East German citizens, such as "Palazzo Prozzo" (a wordplay, as 'protzen' means 'to show off ostentatiously') or "Erichs Lampenladen" (Erich Honecker's lamp shop - a pun on the many tall chandeliers inside it). "Ballast der Republik" (Ballast having the same meaning as in English - burden) was popular as well.

=== Closure and demolition ===
The palace was closed to the public on 19 September 1990 by decree of the Volkskammer when it was found to be contaminated by asbestos, only two weeks before the accession date. On 2 October 1990, the Volkskammer was dissolved and the palace became vacant. By 2003, the asbestos was considered to have been removed along with internal and external fittings allowing either safe reconstruction or safe deconstruction, and the shell of the building was opened for visitors in mid-2003. In November 2003, the Bundestag decided to demolish the palace and reconstruct the Berlin Palace, leaving the area as parkland until funding could be found. The majority of former East Germans opposed the demolition and various protests were held by people who felt the building was an integral part of Berlin's culture and the historic process of the German reunification.

Beginning in early 2004, the palace was used for events, such as housing an exhibition of the Terracotta Army and a special concert by the famous Berlin-based band Einstürzende Neubauten. Afterward, the palace fell into disuse and disrepair. Demolition started on 6 February 2006, and was scheduled to last about 15 months at a cost of €12 million; however, the demolition was delayed after more asbestos was discovered in various locations, and the estimated completion date was pushed back to the end of 2008. About 35,000 tonnes of steel which once held the building together were shipped to the United Arab Emirates to be used for the construction of the Burj Khalifa. Although the original structure in Berlin has been demolished, its sister building, the Kulturpalast in Dresden, is still intact and currently used as a symphony orchestra hall.

=== Berlin Palace reconstruction ===
In January 2006, about two years after the Bundestag decided for the rebuilding of the Berlin Palace, a second definitive vote re-approved the plans. It was decided three of its sides would be exact replicas of the original, but the fourth side and interior would be modern. Called the Humboldtforum, the rebuilt palace houses the Humboldt collection and gallery of non-European art. In November 2008, the Italian architect Francesco Stella was chosen for the project. Reconstruction began in 2015 and was completed in 2020. The building was opened to the public in 2021. Some items from the Palace of the Republic are on display, such as globe chandeliers and an original sign.

== Artworks ==
Sixteen monumental pictures by GDR artists (Walter Womacka, Willi Sitte, Wolfgang Mattheuer, Werner Tübke, and Bernhard Heisig) presented Dreams of Communists. The pictures were shown in Potsdam 20 years later.

== Gallery ==
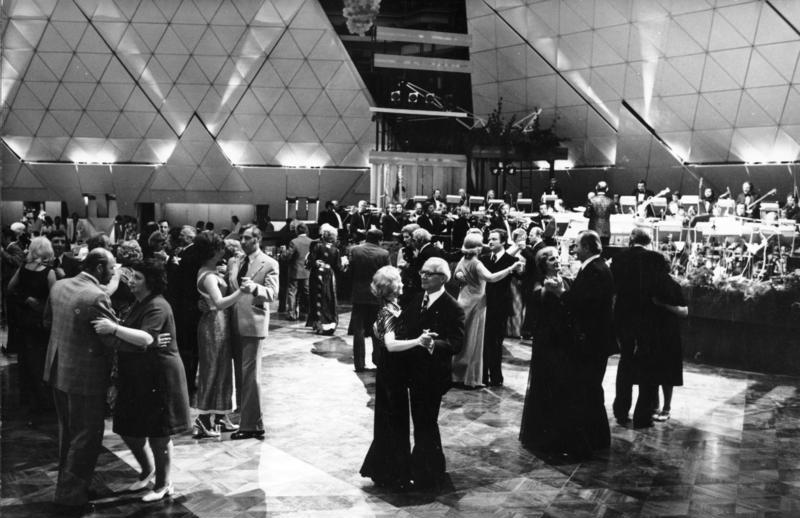
Erich and Margot Honecker at the banquet-ball for the palace's opening in 1976

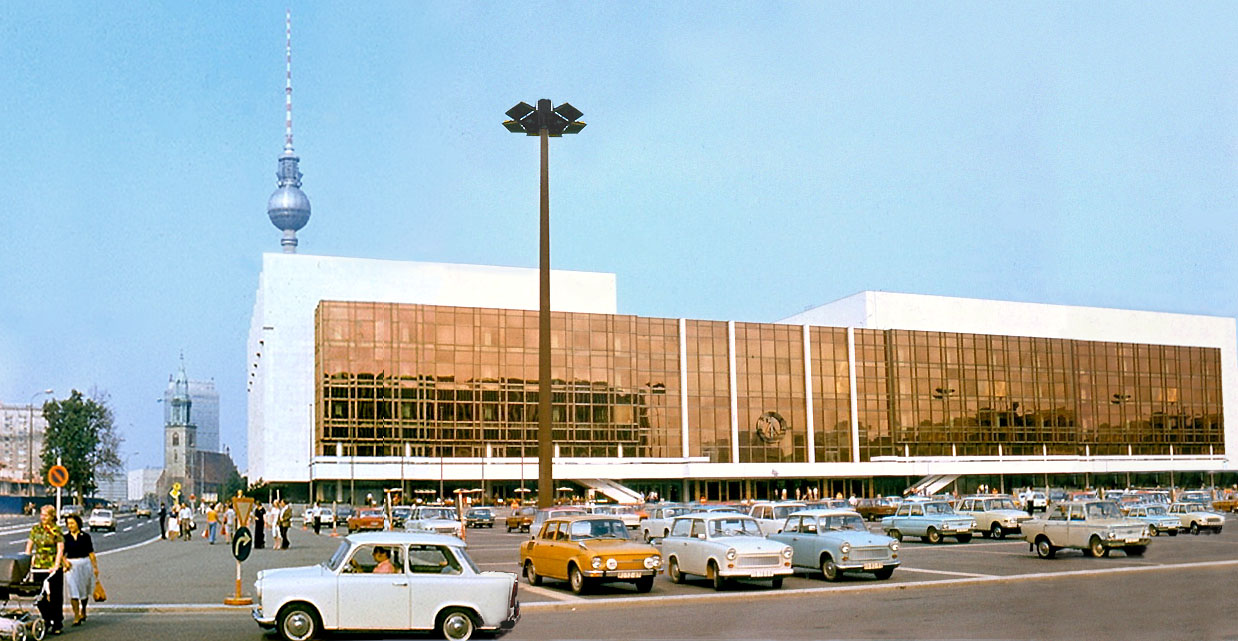
Palast der Republik in 1977 with the Fernsehturm in the background

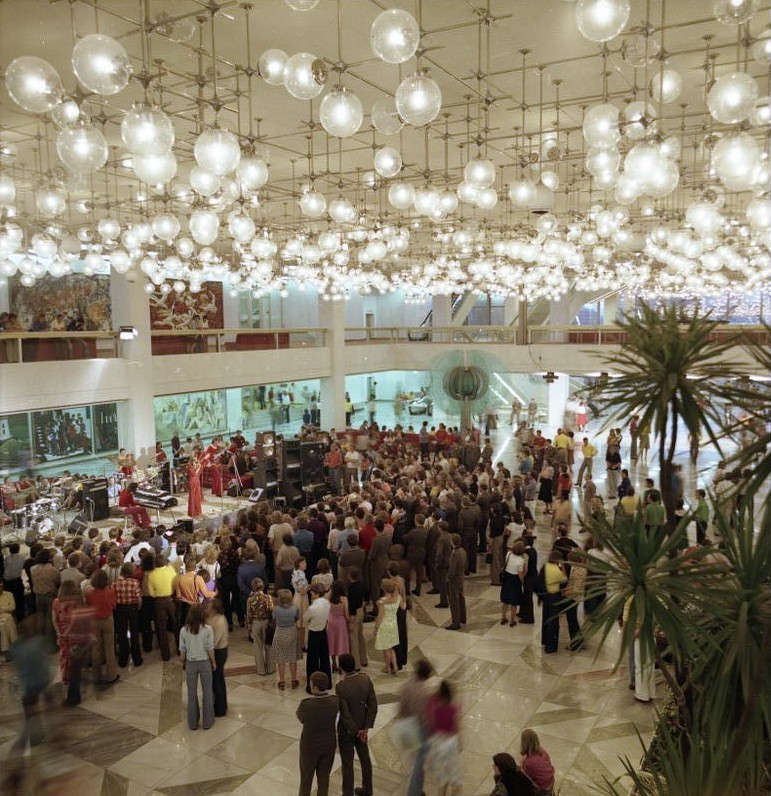
The entrance foyer of the palace and its many lights

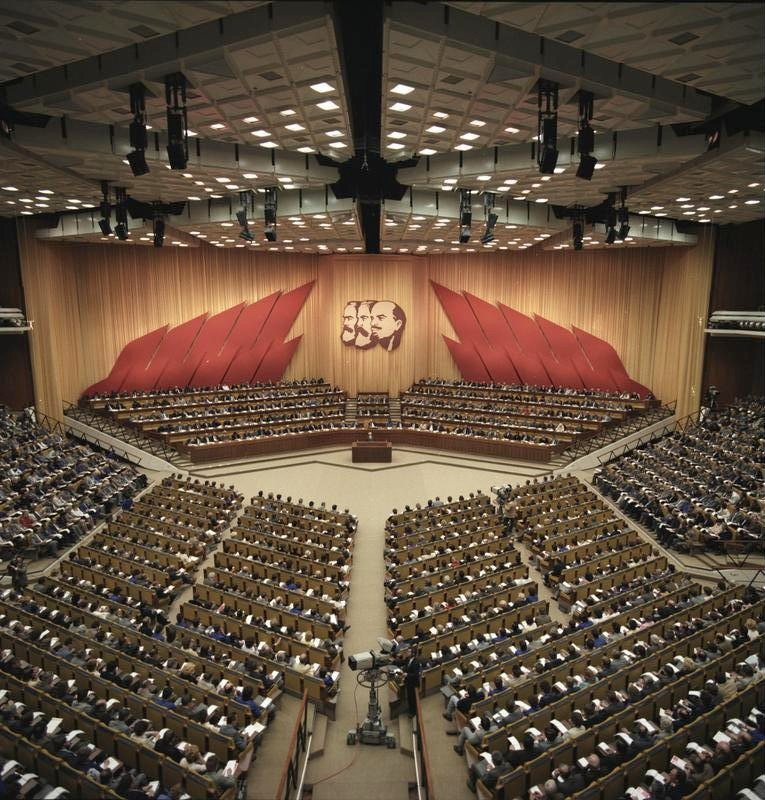
Opening addresses were given in the palace's central hall at the start of East Germany's 11th Party Congress in 1986

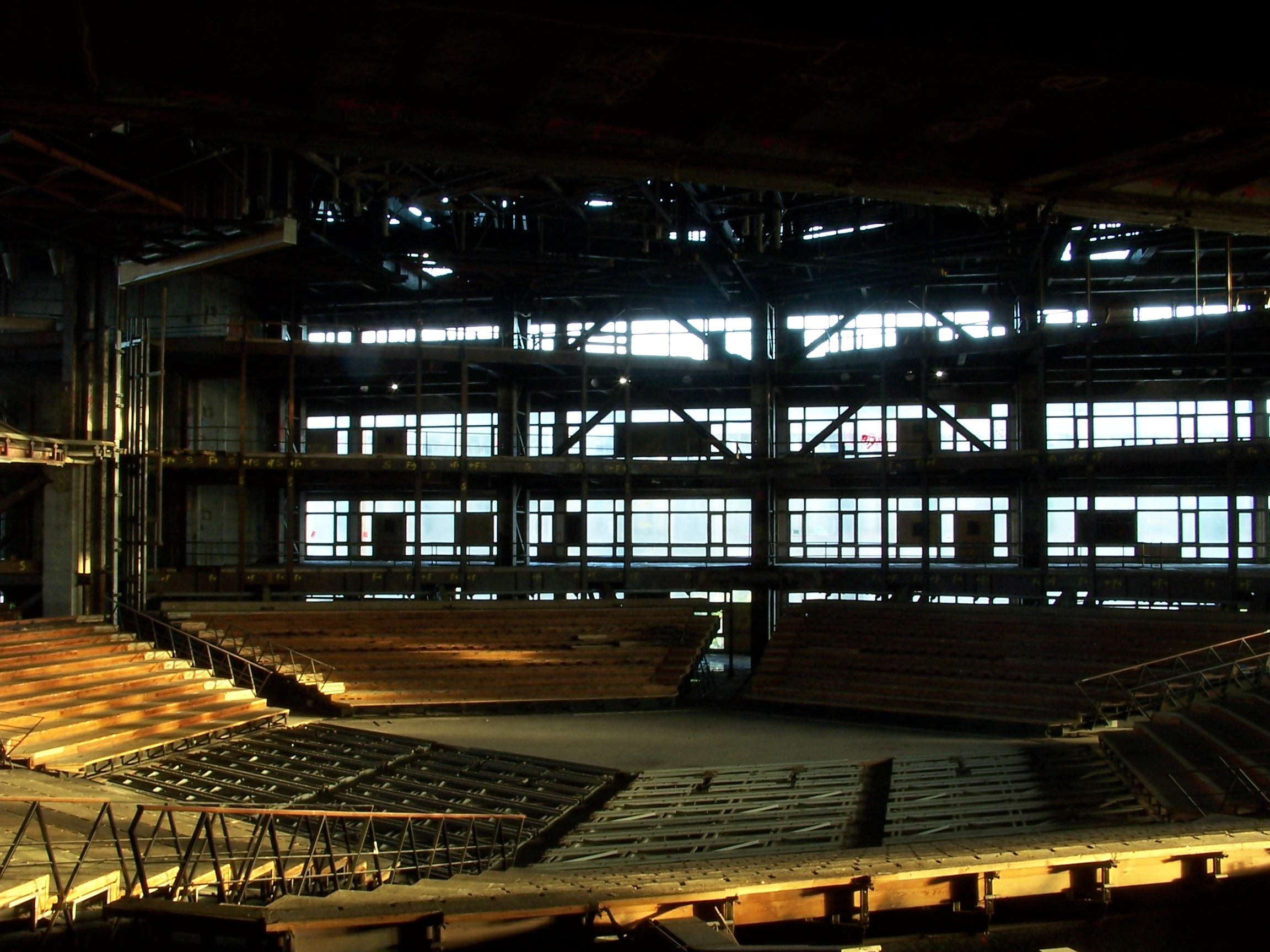
The remains of the central hall in 2003 following the removal of all asbestos and interior furnishings

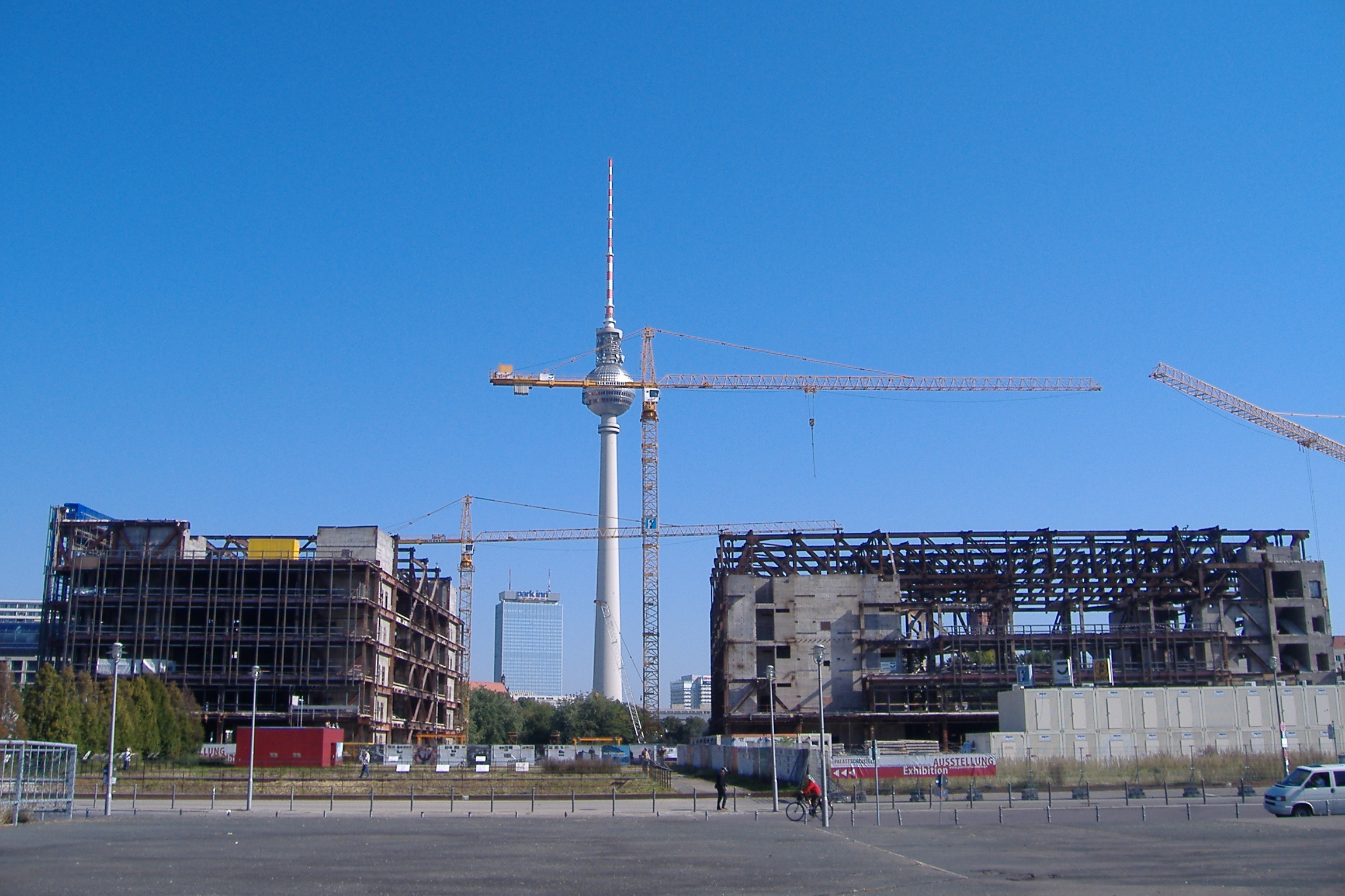
The Palace of the Republic during its demolition in September 2007

== See also ==
- Centre Georges Pompidou
- Finlandia Hall
- Internationales Congress Centrum Berlin
- State Kremlin Palace
- Great Hall of the People
- Prague Congress Centre
