= Marianne Baum =

German communist and anti-Nazi (1912–1942)

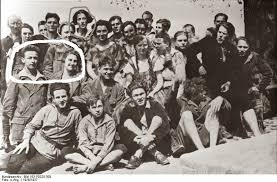
- Herbert Baum and Marianne are circled in white. Olga Benario is circled in gray.
- Born: Marianne Cohn; 9 February 1912; Saarburg, German Empire
- Died: 18 August 1942 (aged 30); Berlin-Plötzensee, Germany
- Cause of death: Guillotine
- Known for: Anti-Nazi
- Political party: Communist
- Spouse: Herbert Baum

Marianne Baum (February 9, 1912 – August 18, 1942) was a German communist and anti-Nazi. She was executed after an attack on a propaganda show in Berlin.

== Life and death ==
Marianne Cohn was born in Saarburg in 1912 into a Jewish family. She had one brother, Lothar Cohn, who would also become a communist activist. In 1927, at the age of 14, she met her future husband Herbert Baum while attending the Jewish youth group Deutsch-Jüdische Jugendgemeinschaft.

Around 1930, Baum joined her first communist organization, the Communist Youth Federation (KJVD). In 1933, Marianne became an active member of the Communist resistance movement. However, the Jewish Baums were pushed out of the more mainstream organizations such as the KPD and the German Communist Party, as both groups thought having Jewish members would be too great a risk in antisemitic Nazi Germany.

Interested in continued resistance, the Baums formed a Communist-Jewish resistance group "Gruppe Herbert Baum" in Berlin. The Herbert Baum Group became a successful resistance organization separate from the mainstream communist party, and planned and executed a successful attack on an anti-Communist propaganda exhibition in Berlin titled "Soviet Paradise". The attack on May 18, 1942, led to the arrest of the group's members.

Marianne Baum and eight other activists were sentenced to death for treason, and were executed by guillotine on August 18, 1942, at the Berlin-Plötzensee penitentiary.

== Legacy ==
A plaque in the Weißensee Cemetery in Berlin commemorates the Herbert Baum Group. There is also a street near the cemetery named Herbert-Baum-Straße. In Berlin's Lustgarten, a monument designed by Jürgen Raue was erected in 1981 commemorating the 1942 attack. The East German government, which established these memorials, emphasized Baum's allegiance to Communism.
