= Heinz Graffunder =

German architect (1926-1994)

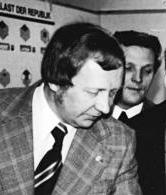
- Heinz Graffunder (1974)
- Born: 23 December 1926; Berlin, Germany
- Died: 9 December 1994 (aged 67); Berlin, Germany
- Occupation: Architect
- Political party: SED

Heinz Graffunder (23 December 1926 – 9 December 1994) was a German architect.

== Life ==
=== Early years ===
Heinz Graffunder as born into a working-class family in Berlin. His father worked as a pipefitter. Like others of his generation, the final part of his schooling was accelerated due to the pressures of World War II. He was then conscripted into the German army, which led to a period as a prisoner of war. The war itself ended approximately five months after his eighteenth birthday with Berlin occupied by Soviet troops. They would remain in the eastern part of what remained of Germany for nearly five decades. On his release Graffunder undertook an apprenticeship in the building trade.

=== Architecture ===
In October 1949 the German Democratic Republic was formally launched out of what had previously been better known as the Soviet occupation zone, although the basis for a return to one-party government had already been set in place with the creation of a ruling party back in 1946: in reality building the new country was an iterative process lasting many years, and involving a necessarily massive building boom. Between 1949 and 1952 Graffunder studied architecture at the city's Building Academy (Vereinigten Bauschulen von Groß-Berlin) After that, between 1952 and 1967, he worked as an architect and city planner. He was employed as department head with Berlin's "VEB Development Project Support" organisation ("Bauprojektbetreuung Groß-Berlin") and with its various successor entities.

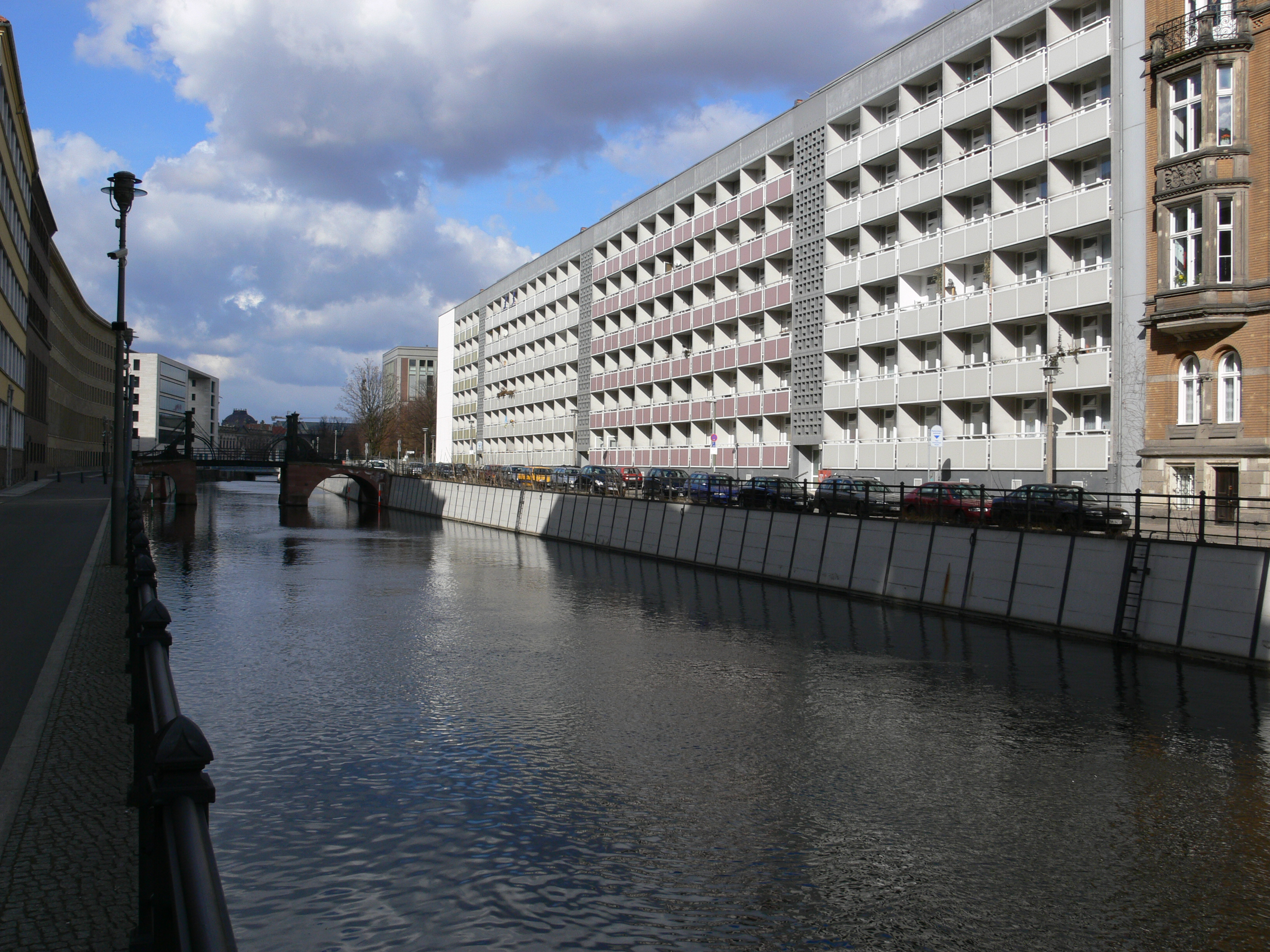
Apartment blocks in the Berlin Friedrichsgracht (Heinz Graffunder & Eckart Schmidt 1963-65)

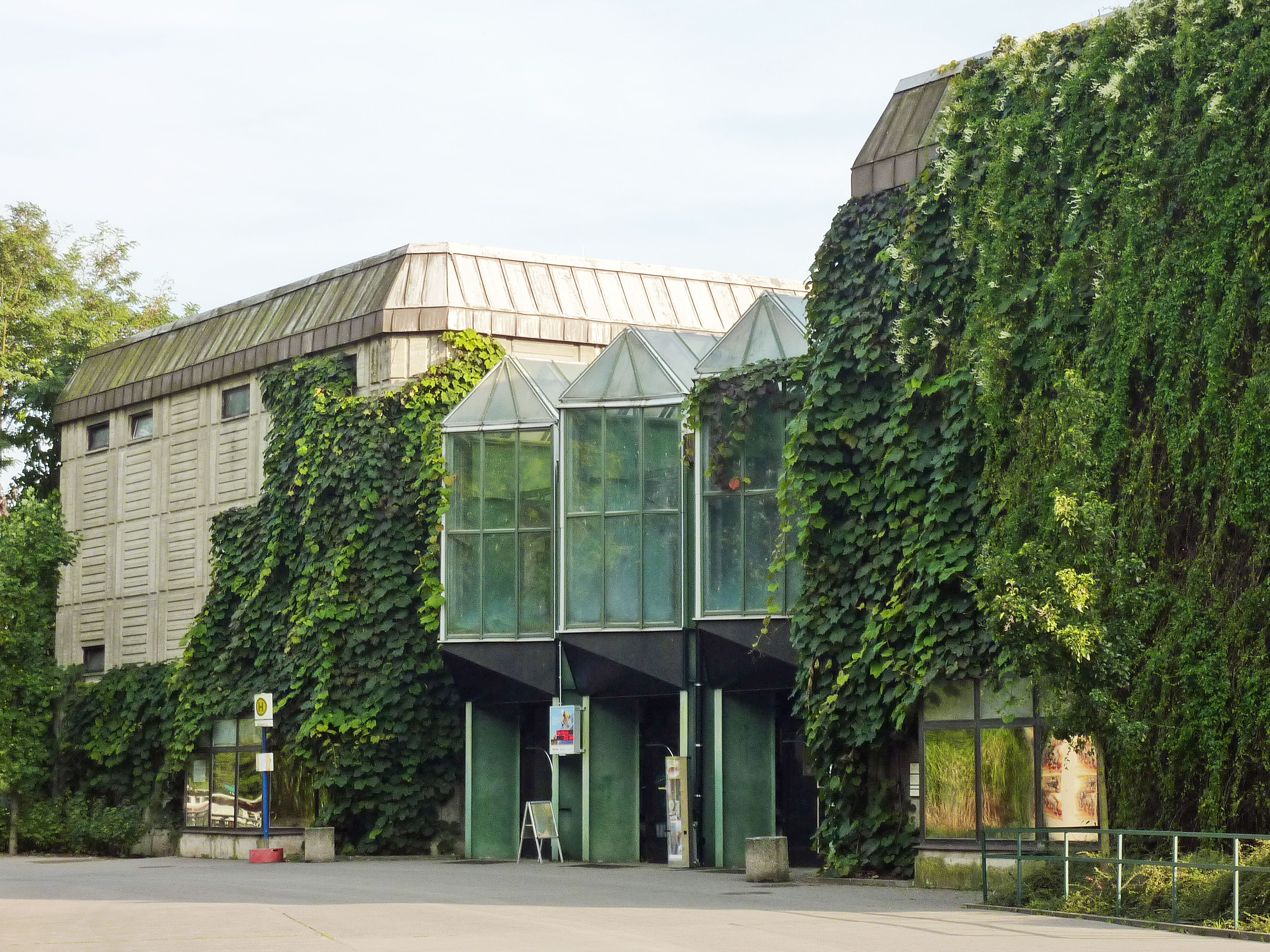
Elephant House (Humans' entrance), Berlin Zoo (Heinz Graffunder)

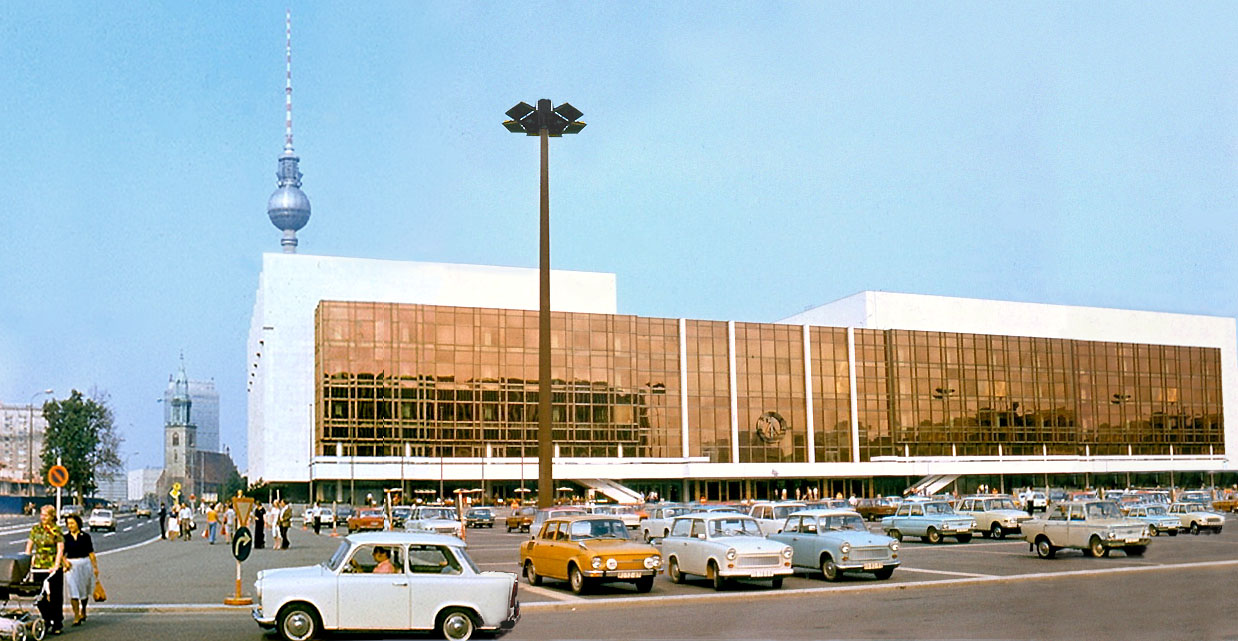
The Palace of the Republic in 1976 (Heinz Graffunder 1973-76)

==== The first fifteen years ====
Graffunder is remembered, in particular, for the impact of his work on the north-eastern part of Berlin, but he also received commissions from outside the German Democratic Republic. During the years up to 1967 he was responsible for the following construction projects:

- Residential developments in Berlin-Friedrichshain and Berlin-Lichtenberg.
- Since its opening in 1954, buildings at the city's zoo in Berlin-Friedrichsfelde, including the Alfred Brehm building and the Elephant House.
- 1957-1960 Outdoor swimming pool at Berlin-Pankow
- 1967-1973 City Hall Approaches (Rathauspassagen).
- 1963–1965 East German embassy in Budapest (joint commission with Eckart Schmidt). Today the post reunification German embassy.
- Buildings for zoos in Rostock, Cottbus, Neustrelitz, Magdeburg and Erfurt.
- 1964-1966 Project leadership for apartment blocks in the Berlin Friedrichsgracht (joint commission with Eckart Schmidt).
- Sofia Central Station (project led by Milko Bechev).

==== Middle years ====
Between 1967 and 1972 he worked as section head for the Berlin's extensive state-owned apartment construction project (VEB Projektierung des Volkseigenen Wohnungsbaukombinates). His responsibilities included handling with Eckart Schmidt the formidable Rathauspassagen development, including Liebknechtstraße, along with a share in the architectural oversight of the residential complex at Berlin-Fennpfuhl

==== Palace of the Republic ====
"It was clearly a public building. But for me all that is left of it is the memory of a grey gloomy construction. It is not stimulating or inviting."
"Er war sicher ein öffentliches Haus. Aber mir bleibt nur die Erinnerung an einen grauen, düsteren Bau. Er hatte wenig Einladendes, daran lässt sich nicht rütteln."

Heinz Graffunder, shortly before his death, discussing the state of the Palace of the Republic

Between 1972 and 1973 he was chief architect in the Institute for Residential and Social Development at the East German Building Academy. After that he headed up the project cooperative and was chief architect for the Palace of the Republic, built between 1973 and 1976 (and controversially demolished some 40 years later). This was almost certainly the most high-profile of his projects. The building accommodated the official legislature of the German Democratic Republic. After reunification the building was no longer needed for this purpose and refurbishment attempts were hampered by the discovery of large quantities of asbestos in its construction.

==== Later career ====
After completion of the "Palace" he went on to work, between 1976 and 1988, as Chief architect and director of large redevelopment projects in Berlin-Marzahn and Berlin-Hellersdorf. He also took a post, initially in 1984 as a guest lecturer and subsequently with a full-time professorship of Design Theory, at the Brandenburg University of Technology in Cottbus.

==== After reunification ====
As the German Democratic Republic moved into its final phase, in 1989 Graffunder retired on grounds of invalidity. Nevertheless, following reunification, between 1990 and his death in 1994 he operated his own Architecture Bureau in Berlin. Commissions included two garden centres, several hotel developments and urban development projects.

At this time he involved himself in plans for the preservation of the Palace of the Republic, now that its original purpose had been overtaken by political changes. He prepared several proposals for converting and extending the building which were presented to the public in an exhibition. His most ambitious proposal involved positioning a new four level block building in front of the Palace, copying the facade of the original and connecting the two with glass and steel walkways, creating a new unified structure. He was able to call in support from several politicians, but he was unable to stop the decision to tear the building down. Nevertheless, at the time of his death early in December 1994 the demolition of the Palace of the Republic had not yet been carried out.

== Prizes and honours ==
- 1969 National Prize of East Germany for Berlin zoo
- 1976 National Prize of East Germany for the Palace of the Republic

In 2004, to mark the tenth anniversary of his death, a small park was named after Heinz Graffunder, on the site of a former apartment block that he had designed. After reunification the tenants had moved out and the empty building had fallen into disrepair, which is why it had been demolished.
