= Charlotte Holzer =

Jewish resistance fighter in World War II

Charlotte Abraham Päch Holzer (December 7, 1909 – September 29, 1980) was a Jewish resistance fighter during World War II. She was a member of the Baum Group, a collaborative anti-Nazi resistance organization.

== Life ==
Holzer was born Charlotte Abraham in Berlin, Germany.

She trained to become a nurse at the Jewish infants’ home in Niederschönhausen and then worked as a nurse in the Jewish hospital on Iranische Strasse. In the early 1930s, Holzer joined a Communist cell that had formed at the hospital.

In 1932 or 1933 she married Gustav Paech, a communist who lectured in study groups. The couple had a daughter named Eva the same year they were married. Paech was arrested for in August 1933. He served a 16-month sentence for conspiracy. The couple separated after his release.

Holzer met Herbert Baum in 1940 when he was a patient at the hospital where she worked. Baum was the Jewish leader of an anti-Nazi resistance group that became known as the Baum Group. The group printed and distributed anti-Nazi literature and organized activities. Holzer joined the Baum group that year.

Holzer was arrested on October 8, 1942, along with Baum Group members Martin Kochmann, Felix Heiman and Herbert Bodzislavski. Her trial took place on June 29, 1943, while she was in a prison infirmary due to being sick with Scarlet fever. Holzer was convicted and was sentenced to various prison and labor camps. She escaped from a prison hospital in June 1944.

Holzer returned to Germany after the war and married Richard Holzer, a Baum Group member who had participated in an arson attack against an anti-Soviet exhibit in Berlin. Richard had escaped to Hungary after the arson attack. He was the only person who perpetrated the attack to survive. The others were executed by the Nazis or murdered by the Nazis in concentration camps.

Holzer was one of the very few Baum Group members to survive the war. In the 1960s, she was interviewed by East German journalists about the group's resistance activities. Her interviews were compiled and published in the book, Years of Defiance: The Herbert Baum Group and Jewish Resistance in Berlin.

== Publications ==
Years of Defiance: The Herbert Baum Group and Jewish Resistance in Berlin, 2022
