= The Soviet Paradise =

Nazi exhibition and film

- German: Das Sowjet-Paradies
- Directed by: Friedrich Albat
- Release date: 1941
- Running time: 14 minutes
- Country: Germany
- Language: German

The Soviet Paradise (German: Das Sowjet-Paradies) was the name of an exhibition and a propaganda film created by the Department of Film of the Nazi propaganda organisation Reichspropagandaleitung, and was displayed in the larger cities of the Reich and occupied countries, such as Vienna, Prague, and Berlin. Its goal was to show "poverty, misery, depravity and need" of the nations in the Soviet Union under "Jewish Bolshevist" rule and thus to justify the war against the Soviet Union. The accompanying guide for the exhibition noted, "The present Soviet state is nothing other than the realization of that Jewish invention".

The exhibition included entire households with its contents, transported from the Eastern Front, on display. The exhibition contained images of firing squads and bodies of young girls, some still children, who had been hung and were dangling from ropes. There was also a captured Soviet KV-2 Kliment Voroshilov tank in front of the entrance.

From 8 May to 21 June 1942, the exhibition was in the Lustgarten in Berlin and according to official information 1.3 million people visited the show. This was opened with a large parade and a speech by Leopold Gutterer, the State Secretary of the Reich Ministry of Propaganda, in front of the exhibition hall.

On May 18, the Baum Group organized an arson attack against it, which only caused minor damage to the exhibits, but was deeply embarrassing to the regime. During the following 1½ years, Nazi officials killed 32 supporters and members of Baum's groups, including Herbert Baum, Marianne Baum, and Suzanne Wesse. The exhibition also attracted the attention of members of another resistance group, the Red Orchestra, who affixed posters advertising the event with their own anti-Nazi stickers ("Permanent Exhibition. The Nazi Paradise. War, Hunger, Lies, Gestapo. How much longer?"). It was an action that led to the arrest and execution of Helmut Himpel and Maria Terwiel.

Unfortunately for these anti-Nazi resistance groups, one of the main sponsors of the exhibition, Reinhard Heydrich, was assassinated in Prague at the end of May 1942. This caused an increase in Nazi reactions to any perceived resistance and vastly increased the retributions on any resistor and their associates, with Berlin Jews a particular focus of these attacks.

As well as the glossy brochure, a short propaganda film was created to supplement the exhibition. A series of postcards was also created, and these were geographically franked as the exhibition moved around the Reich, starting in Vienna (13 December 1941) and ending in Essen (30 October 1942), via Prague, Berlin and Hamburg.
