= Herbert Baum =

German resistance fighter (1912–1942)

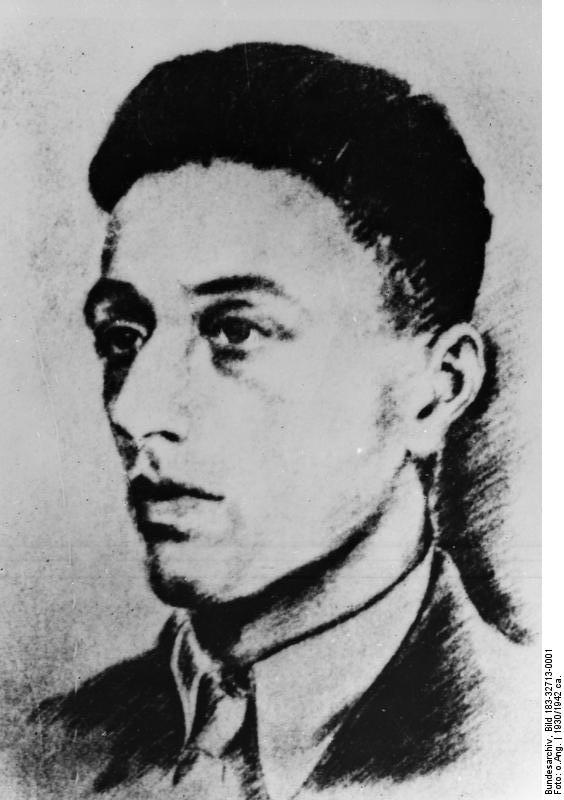
- Baum circa 1930
- Born: 10 February 1912; Moschin, Province of Posen, German Empire
- Died: 11 June 1942 (aged 30); Moabit Prison, Berlin
- Occupation: Electrician
- Spouse: Marianne Baum

Herbert Baum (February 10, 1912 – June 11, 1942) was a Jewish member of the German resistance against National Socialism. Baum organized a large network of resisters within Berlin. Most of these activists, like Baum, were Jewish and had backgrounds in the pre-1933 German-Jewish youth organizations, and most were affiliated with the German Communist Party (KPD), the Social Democratic Party (SPD), and/or their youth movements. While often described as a "Communist" (KPD) organization, in reality the Baum Group was a leftist organization (or network of small groups) that included socialists, anti-Stalinist leftists, some who were influenced by anarchism, and so on.

== Life ==
Baum was born in Moschin, Province of Posen; his family moved to Berlin when he was young. After he graduated from secondary school there, he began an apprenticeship as an electrician, which became his profession.

By 1926, he was an active member of different left wing and Jewish youth organizations, and from 1931 he became a member of the Young Communist League of Germany (KJVD).

After the seizure of power by the National Socialists he began, together with his wife Marianne Baum (February 9, 1912 - August 18, 1942) and their friends, Martin and Sala Kochmann, to organize meetings dealing with the threat of Nazism, meeting in the Kochmann drawing room and in the apartments of other members. The circle of friends, most of whom were Jewish, designated Herbert Baum as chairman. Up to 100 youths attended these meetings at various times, engaging in political debates and cultural discussions. The group openly distributed leaflets arguing against National Socialism.

In 1940 Baum was rounded up and forced into slave labour at the electromotive works of the Siemens-Schuckertwerke (today Siemens AG). From 1941, he headed a group of Jewish slave labourers at the plant, who, to escape deportation to concentration camps, went into the Berlin underground.

On 18 May 1942, the group organised an arson attack on an anticommunist and anti-Semitic propaganda exhibition known as The Soviet Paradise prepared by Joseph Goebbels at the Berliner Lustgarten. The attack was only partially successful and, within days, a large number of the group's members were arrested and 20 were sentenced to death. Baum and his wife Marianne were arrested on May 22. Herbert Baum was tortured to death in Moabit Prison, dying on June 11, 1942. The Gestapo reported his death as a suicide. His wife, Marianne, was executed in Plötzensee Prison on August 18, 1942. Listing of some of the Baum Group's members with their dates of birth and death; they were all executed in Berlin-Plötzensee on March 4, 1943: Heinz Rotholz (1922–1943), Heinz Birnbaum (1920–1943), Hella Hirsch (1921–1943), Hanni Meyer (1921–1943), Marianne Joachim (1922–1943), Lothar Salinger (1920–1943), Helmut Neumann (1922–1943), Hildegard Löwy and Siegbert Rotholz (1922–1943). There is some disagreement as to the manner of death of at least one of the members. Helmut Neumann was either hanged or decapitated.

== Legacy ==
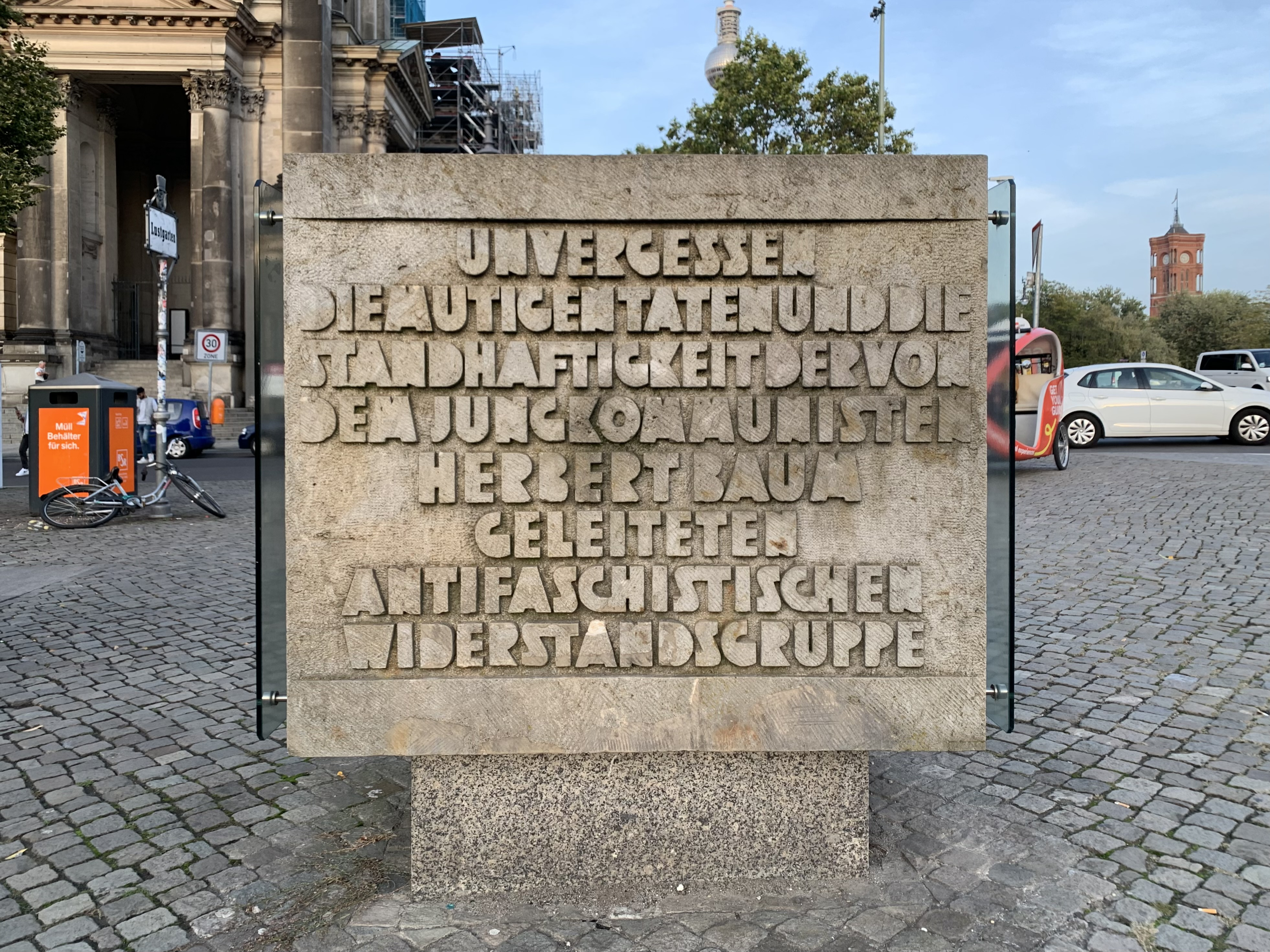
Monument in Lustgarten, Berlin

There is a plaque in the Weißensee Cemetery in Berlin commemorating the Herbert Baum Group and there is also a street near the cemetery named after him, Herbert-Baum-Straße. In the Berlin Lustgarten a monument designed by Jürgen Raue was erected in 1981 memorializing the 1942 attack. While the East German government, which established these memorials, emphasized Baum's allegiance to Communism, other historians (as well as veterans of the group) have noted his group's multiple political and cultural influences and the significance of the Baum group as an example of Jewish resistance to Nazism.
