= Lustgarten =

Park on Museum Island in central Berlin

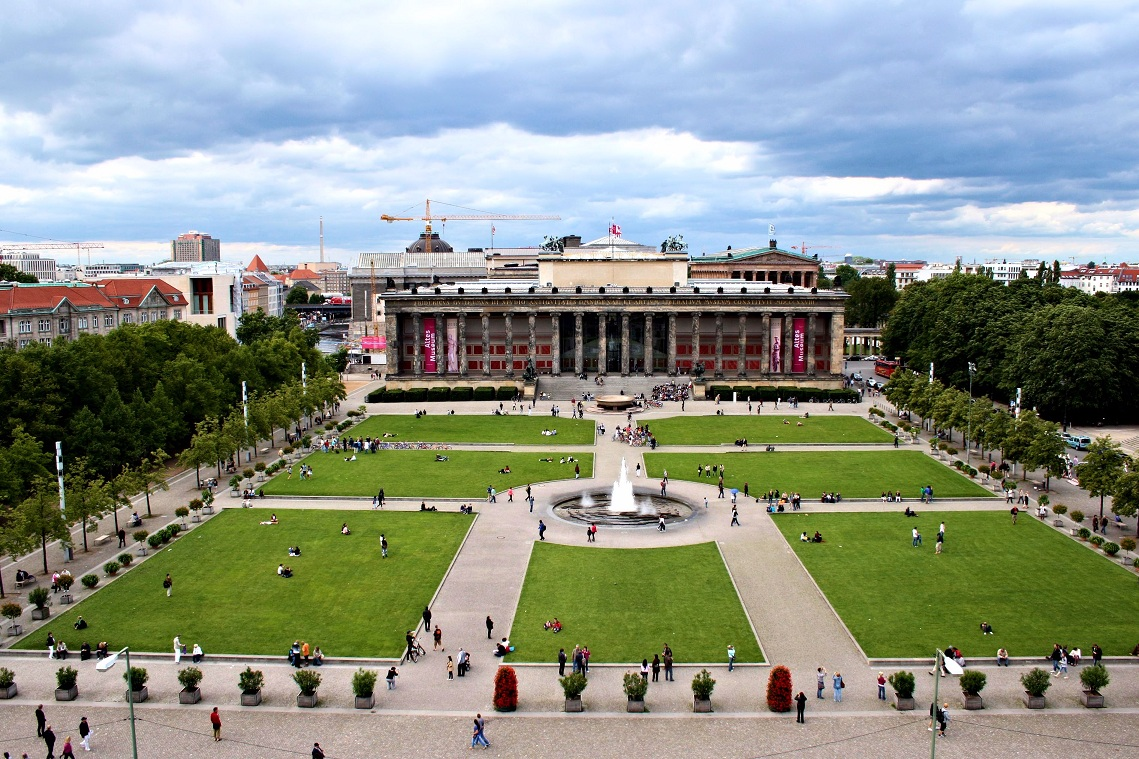
- Lustgarten in front of the Old Museum
- Interactive map of Lustgarten
- Location: Berlin
- Coordinates: 52°31′07″N 13°23′59″E
- Created: 1646
- Status: Open year round

The Lustgarten (German: [ˈlʊstˌɡaʁtn̩], Pleasure Garden) is a park in Museum Island in central Berlin at the foreground of the Altes Museum. It is next to the Berliner Dom (Berlin Cathedral) and near the reconstructed Berliner Stadtschloss (Berlin City Palace) of which it was originally a part. At various times in its history, the park has been used as a parade ground, a place for mass rallies and a public urban park.

The area of the Lustgarten was originally developed in the 16th century as a kitchen garden attached to the Palace, then the residence of the Elector of Brandenburg, the core of the later Kingdom of Prussia. After the devastation of Germany during the Thirty Years War, Berlin was redeveloped by Friedrich Wilhelm (the Great Elector) and his Dutch wife, Luise Henriette of Nassau. It was Luise, with the assistance of a military engineer Johann Mauritz and a landscape gardener Michael Hanff, who, in 1646, converted the former kitchen garden into a formal garden, with fountains and geometric paths, and gave it its current name, Pleasure Garden.

In 1713, Friedrich Wilhelm I became King of Prussia and set about converting Prussia into a militarised state. He ripped out his grandmother's garden and converted the Lustgarten into a sand-covered parade ground. (Pariser Platz near the Brandenburg Gate and Leipziger Platz were also laid out as military parade grounds at this time.) In 1790, Friedrich Wilhelm II allowed the Lustgarten to be turned back into a park, but during French occupation of Berlin in 1806 Napoleon again drilled troops there.

In the early 19th century, the enlarged and increasingly wealthy Kingdom of Prussia undertook major redevelopments of central Berlin. A large, new classical building, the Old Museum, was built at the north-western end of the Lustgarten by the leading architect, Karl Friedrich Schinkel, and between 1826 and 1829 the Lustgarten was redesigned by Peter Joseph Lenné, with formal paths dividing the park into six sectors. A 13-metre high fountain in the centre, operated by a steam engine, was one of the marvels of the age. In 1871, the fountain was replaced by a large equestrian statue of Friedrich Wilhelm III by Albert Wolff. The statue was unveiled on 16 June 1871. Between 1894 and 1905, the old Protestant royal chapel on the northern side of the park was replaced by a much larger building, the Berlin Cathedral (in German, "Berliner Dom"), designed by Julius Carl Raschdorff.

During the years of the Weimar Republic, the Lustgarten was frequently used for political demonstrations. The Socialists and Communists held frequent rallies there. In August 1921, 500,000 people demonstrated against right-wing extremist violence. After the murder of Foreign Minister Walther Rathenau, on 25 June 1922, 250,000 protested in the Lustgarten. On 7 February 1933, 200,000 people demonstrated against the new Nazi Party regime of Adolf Hitler: shortly afterwards public opposition to the regime was banned. Under the Nazis, the Lustgarten was converted into a site for mass rallies. In 1934, it was paved over and the equestrian statue removed. Hitler addressed mass rallies of up to a million people there.

On 18 May 1942 a resistance group led by Herbert Baum consisting mainly of Jewish men and women, tried to destroy a propaganda exhibition The Soviet Paradise in the Lustgarten. This resulted in the discovery of the group, the death of Baum in Gestapo detention and the execution of at least 27 members of the group. In a "retaliation action," the Reich Security Main Office arrested 500 Jewish men at the end of May, and immediately murdered half of them. A memorial stone made by Jürgen Raue installed in 1981 commemorates the resistance group.

In 1944 the statue of Friedrich Wilhelm III by Albert Wolff was melted down to reuse the metal in war production.

By the end of World War II in the year 1945, the Lustgarten was a bomb-pitted wasteland. The German Democratic Republic left Adolf Hitler's paving in place, but planted lime trees around the parade ground to reduce its militaristic appearance. The whole area was renamed Marx-Engels-Platz. The City Palace was demolished and later replaced by the modernist Palace of the Republic on part of the site. Later the City Palace was reconstructed, it houses the Humboldt Forum museum.

A movement to restore the Lustgarten to its earlier role as a park began once Germany was reunified in 1990. In 1997, the Berlin Senate commissioned the landscape architect Hans Loidl to redesign the area in the spirit of Lenné's design and construction work began in 1998. The Lustgarten now features fountains and is once again a park in the heart of a reunited Berlin.

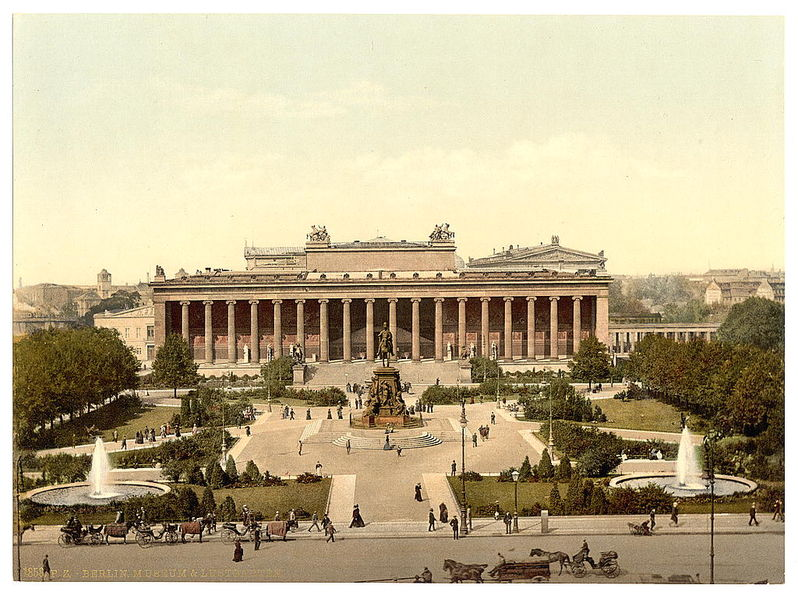
The Lustgarten in 1900, looking north-west toward the Altes Museum (Old Museum)

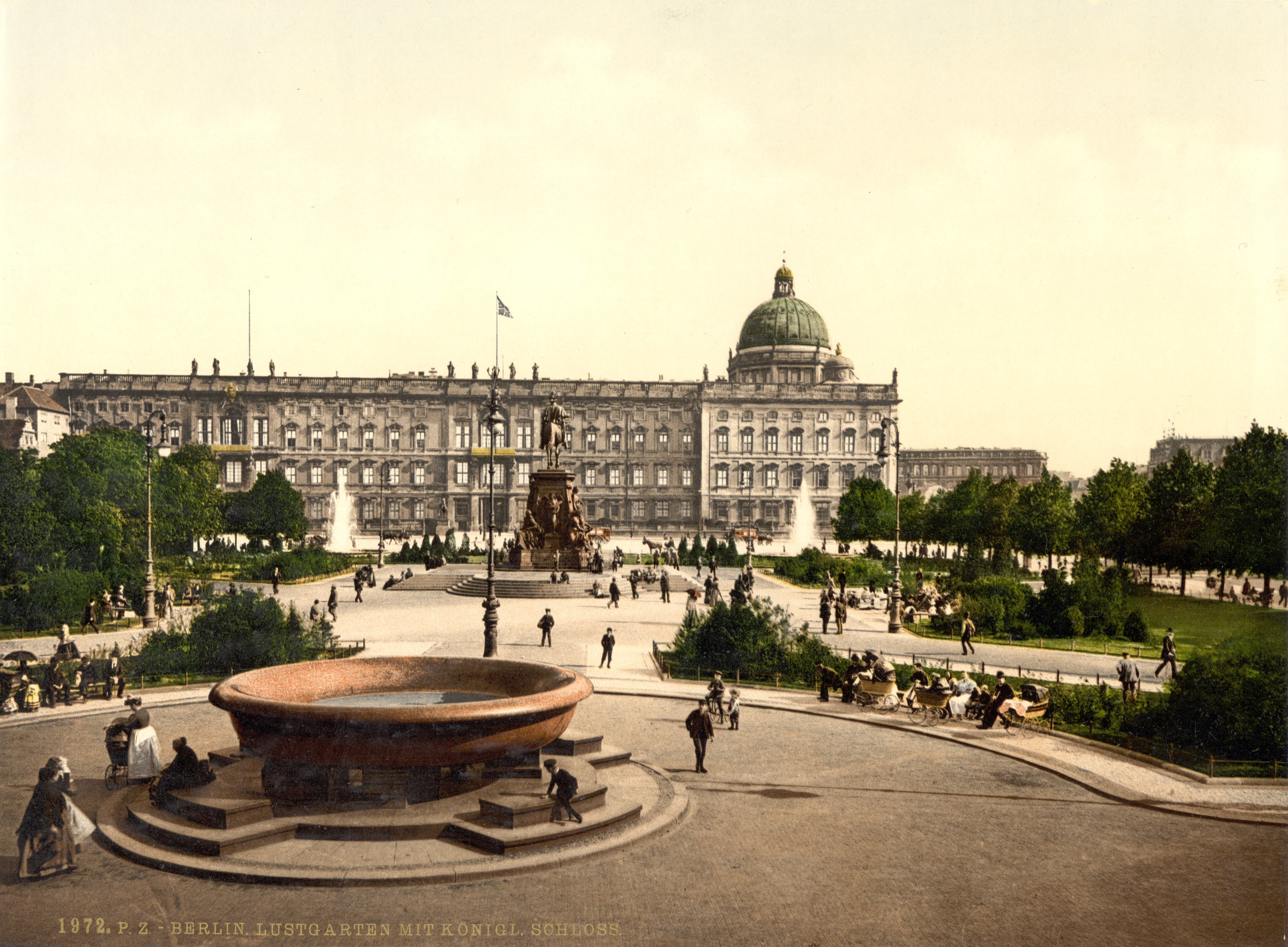
The Lustgarten in 1900 looking toward the Berliner Stadtschloss (Berlin City Palace)

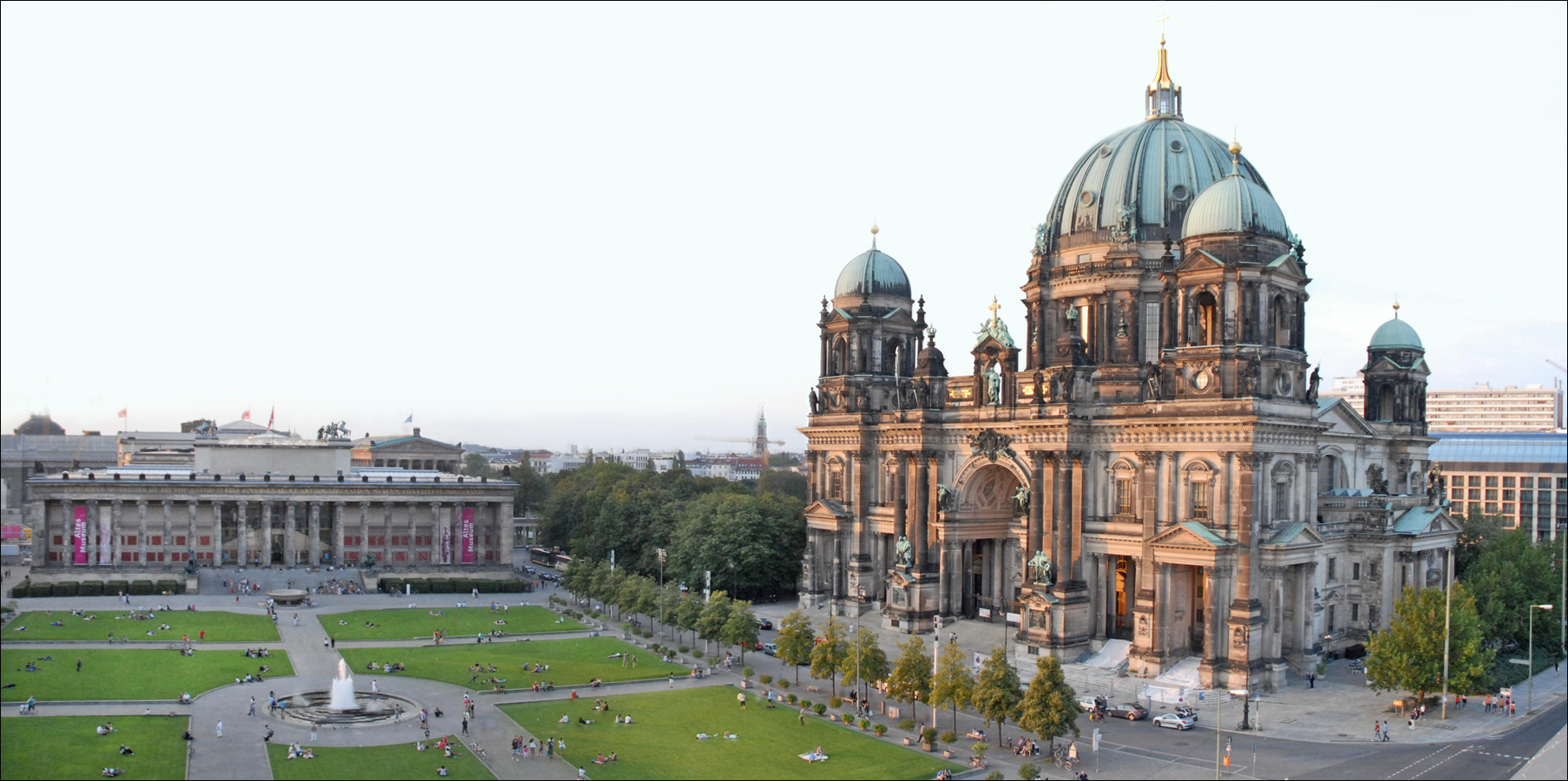
The Lustgarten, from the south-east towards the Berliner Dom (Berlin Cathedral) and the Altes Museum

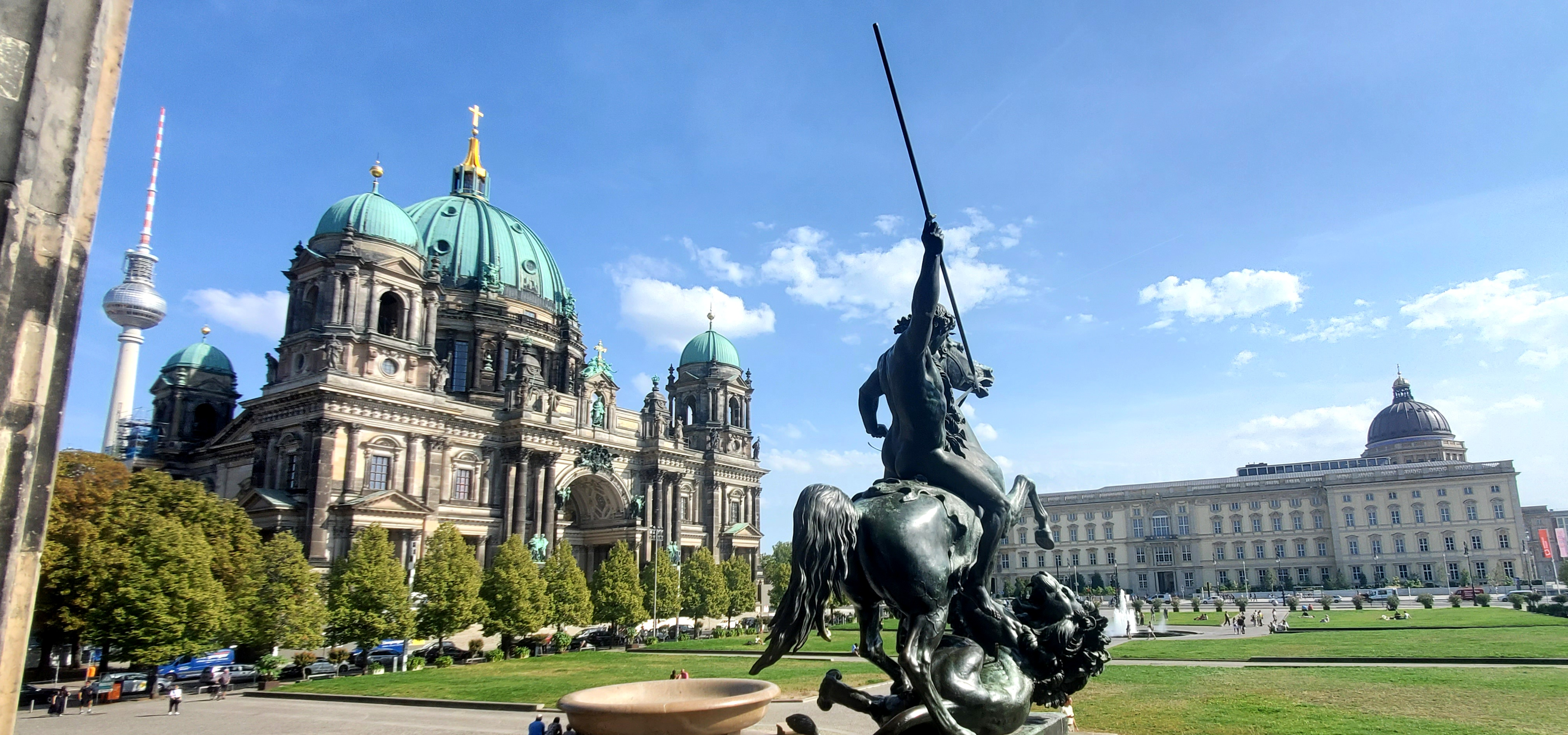
The Lustgarten with the Dom, the Stadtschloss and the Löwenkämpfer

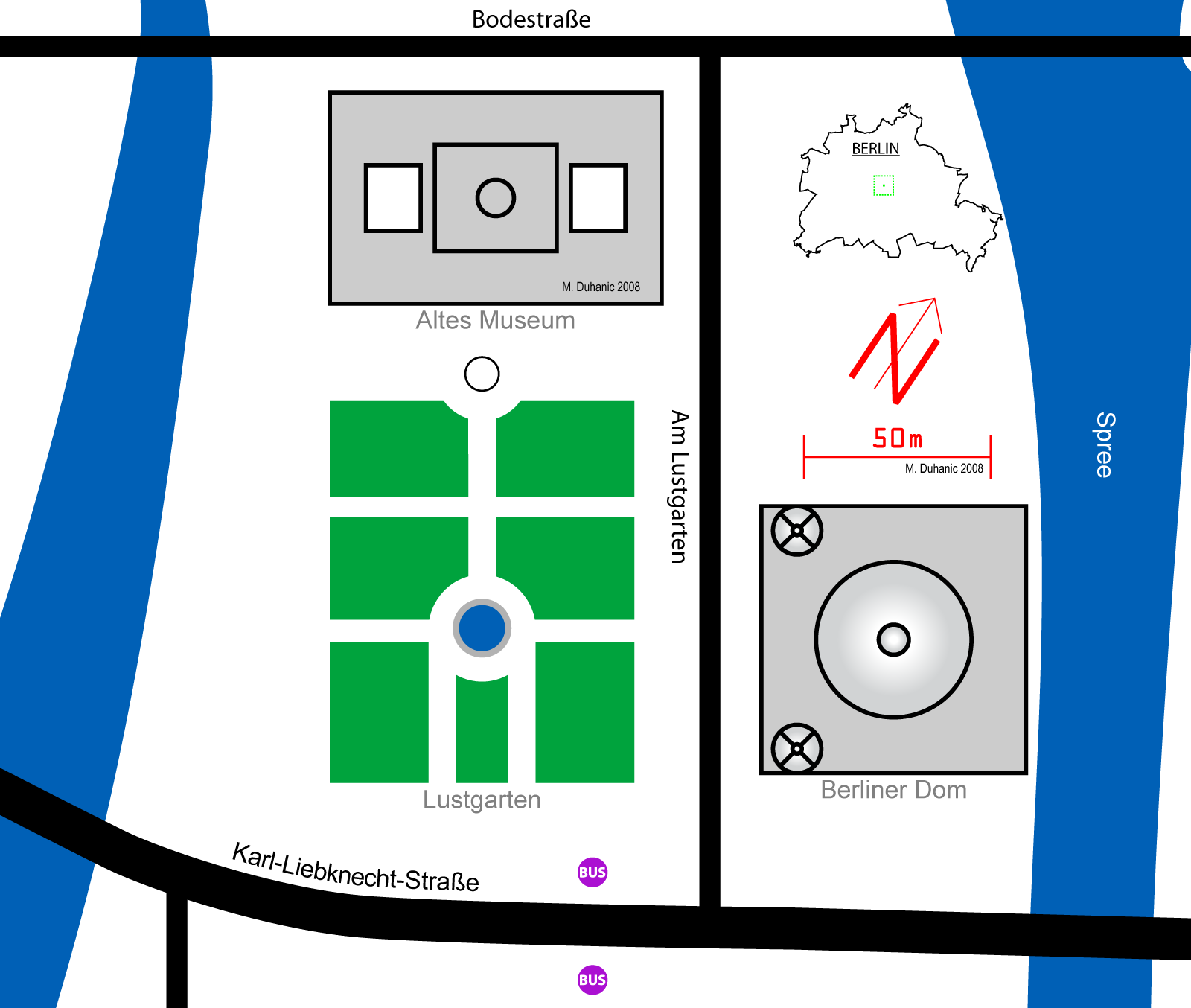
Simplified map of the Lustgarten, showing the Old Museum and Berlin Cathedral

== See also ==
- Granite bowl in Lustgarten
