= Herfurth =

Herfurth is a surname. Notable people with the surname include:

- C. Paul Herfurth (1893–1988), American author of Tune a Day books
- Karoline Herfurth (born 1984), German actress
- Otto Herfurth (1893–1944), World War II German Wehrmacht general
