= Maximovitch =

Maximovitch is a Russian surname. Notable people with the surname include:

- Anna Maximovitch (1901-1943) Russian neuropsychiatrist who became a member of the Red Orchestra
- Basile Maximovitch (1902-1944) Russian mining engineer who also became a member of the Red Orchestra
