= Zehden (surname) =

Zehden is a surname. Notable people with the surname include:

- Emmy Zehden (1900–1944), German Jehovah's witness
- Alfred Zehden (1876–1948), German inventor of maglev

== See also ==
- Cedynia, town in Poland, formerly Zehden, Brandenburg, Germany
