= Plötzensee Prison =

Men's prison in the Charlottenburg-Nord locality of Berlin

Justizvollzugsanstalt Plötzensee
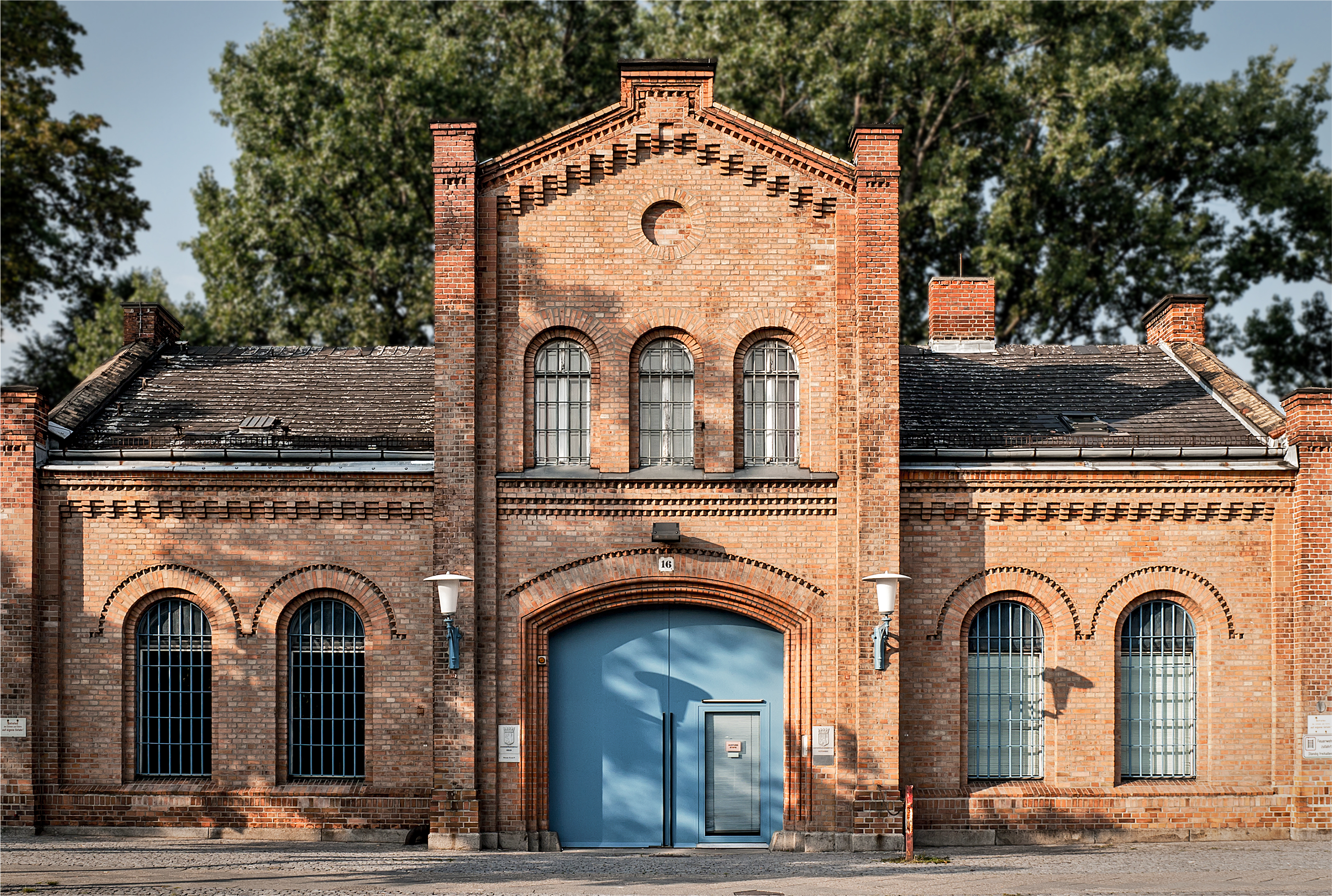
- Interactive map of Justizvollzugsanstalt Plötzensee
- Location: Charlottenburg-Wilmersdorf Berlin, Germany; 52°32′27.6″N 13°19′19.2″E
- Status: Operational
- Population: 577
- Opened: 1879; 147 years ago
- Managed by: Senate of Berlin

Plötzensee Prison (German: Justizvollzugsanstalt Plötzensee, JVA Plötzensee) is a men's prison in the Charlottenburg-Nord locality of Berlin with a capacity for 577 prisoners, operated by the State of Berlin judicial administration. The detention centre established in 1868 has a long history; it became notorious during the Nazi era as one of the main sites of capital punishment, where about 3,000 inmates were executed. Famous inmates include East Germany's last communist leader Egon Krenz.

== History ==
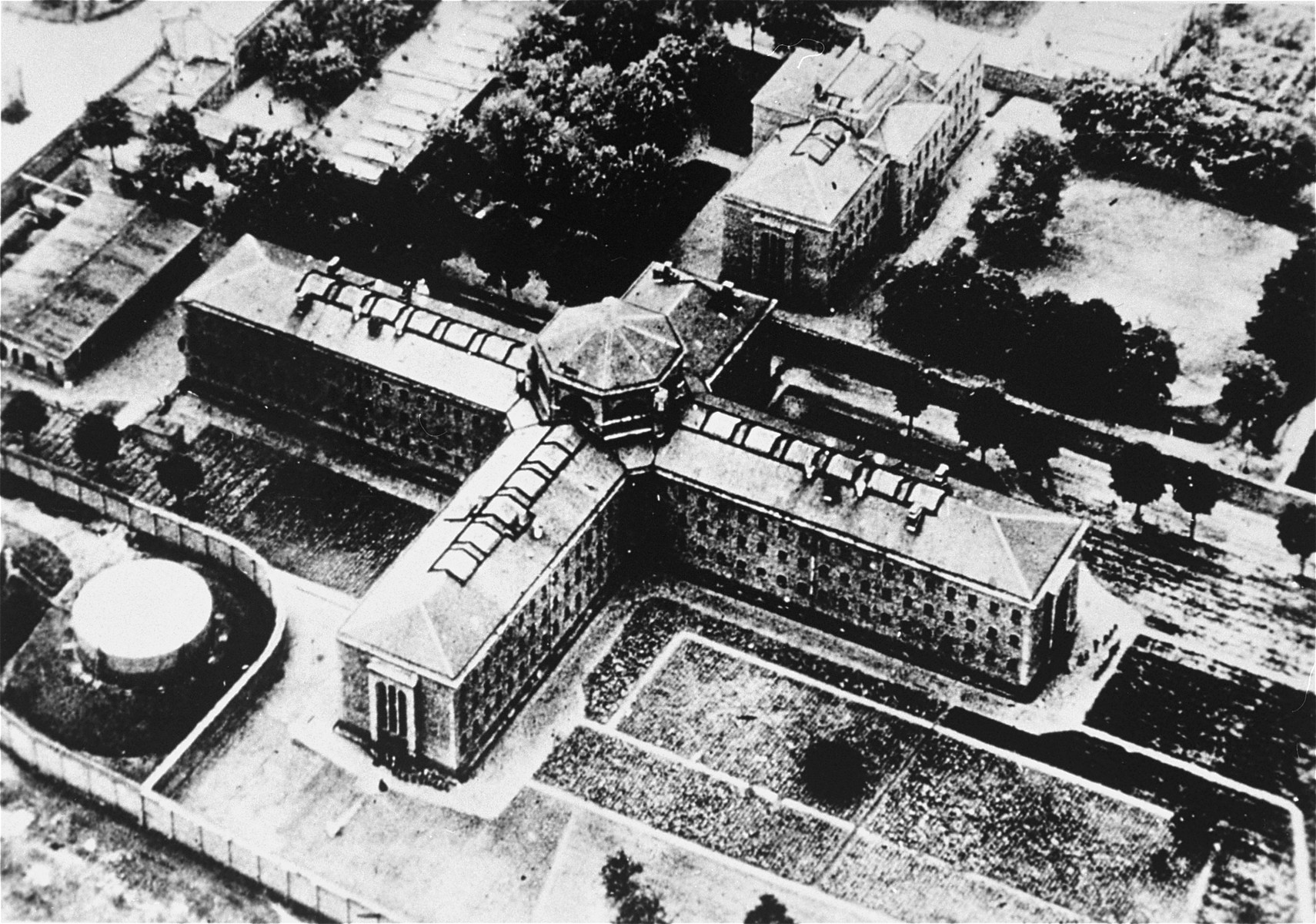
Aerial view of the prison in 1933

The prison was founded by resolution of the Prussian government under King William I and built until 1879 on the estates of the Plötzensee manor, named after nearby Plötzensee Lake (Plötze is the local German name of the common roach, cf. Płoć in Polish). The area divided by the Berlin-Spandau Ship Canal opened in 1859 was located at the outskirts of the Tegel forest northwest of the Berlin city limits in the Province of Brandenburg. The theologian Johann Hinrich Wichern had established the Evangelical Johannesstift borstal nearby, which in 1905 moved to Spandau–Hakenfelde. In 1915, the lands east of the canal with Plötzensee Lake were incorporated into Berlin (the present-day Wedding district), the remaining area around the prison walls became part of the Berlin Charlottenburg borough upon the 1920 Greater Berlin Act. Since 2004, it belongs to the Charlottenburg-Nord locality.

The original name of what is today Haus 1 was Strafgefängnis Plötzensee, which also translates to Plötzensee Prison. Up to 1,400 inmates lived on premises of 25.7 ha (64 acres) including a church and a Jewish prayer area, then the largest prison of the German Empire. After World War II, the buildings demolished by the bombing of Berlin were rebuilt and housed a youth detention center (Jugendstrafanstalt Berlin) for offenders between the ages of 14 and 21. When it in 1987 moved to a newly built annex on Friedrich-Olbricht-Damm in the west, Haus 1 of Plötzensee Prison again became a men's prison with capacity for 577 inmates. Upon the end of the Cold War and German reunification, the last communist East German leader Egon Krenz, convicted for manslaughter by Schießbefehl order at the Berlin Wall, from 2000 until 2003 served his sentence there.

In 1983, a modern women's prison was built south of Friedrich-Olbricht-Damm on the Bundesautobahn 100 (Stadtring) highway, since 1998 it houses the JVA Charlottenburg for about 300 adult male prisoners, mainly drug addicts.

One in three inmates of the prison is incarcerated for repeated public transport fare evasion. In December 2021, Plötzensee was the first prison visited by Arne Semsrott as part of his Freiheitsfonds initiative, which pays for the release of people in prison for unpaid public transport fares.

== Plötzensee Memorial ==
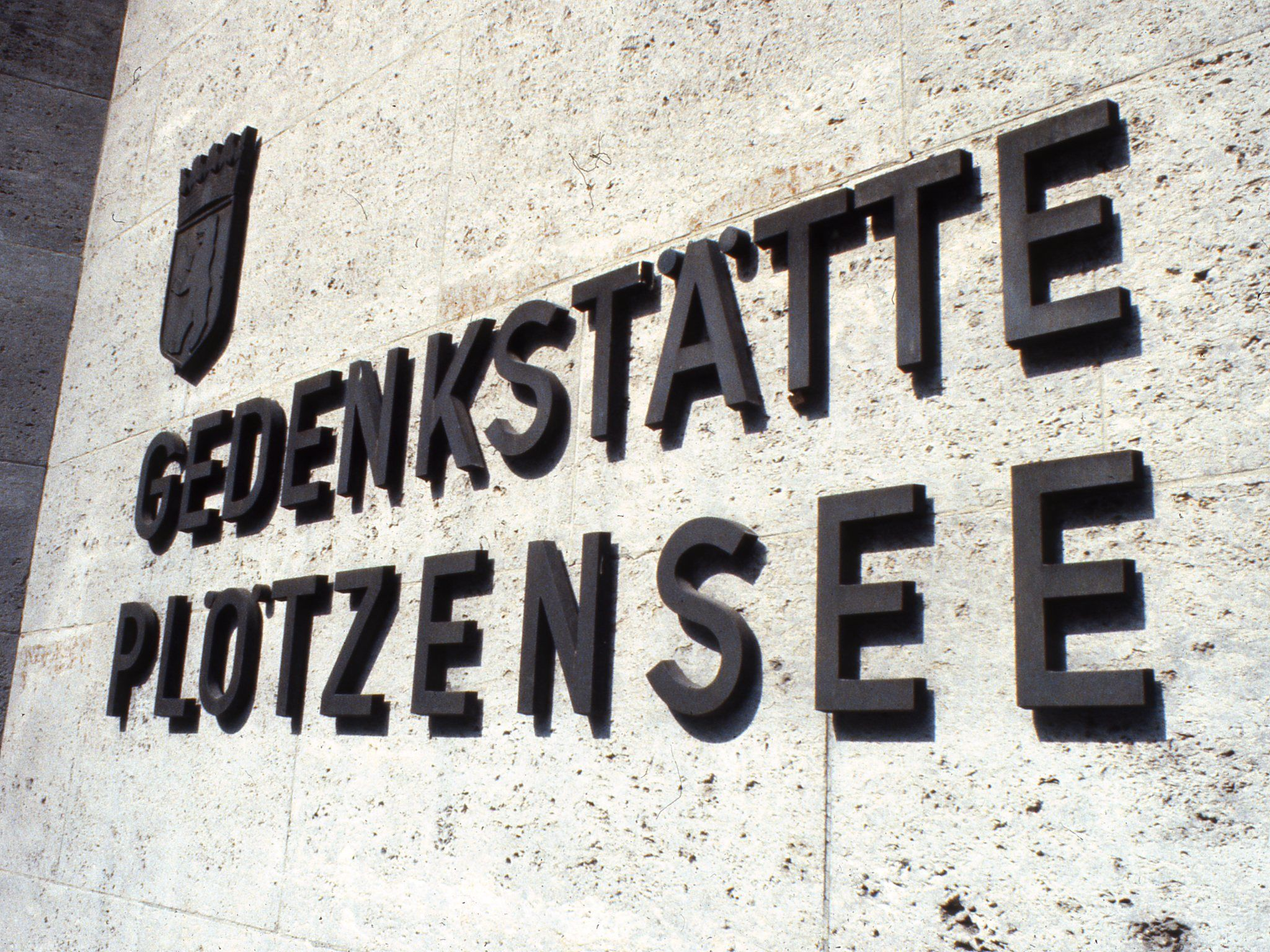
Exterior sign at Plötzensee Memorial, 1984

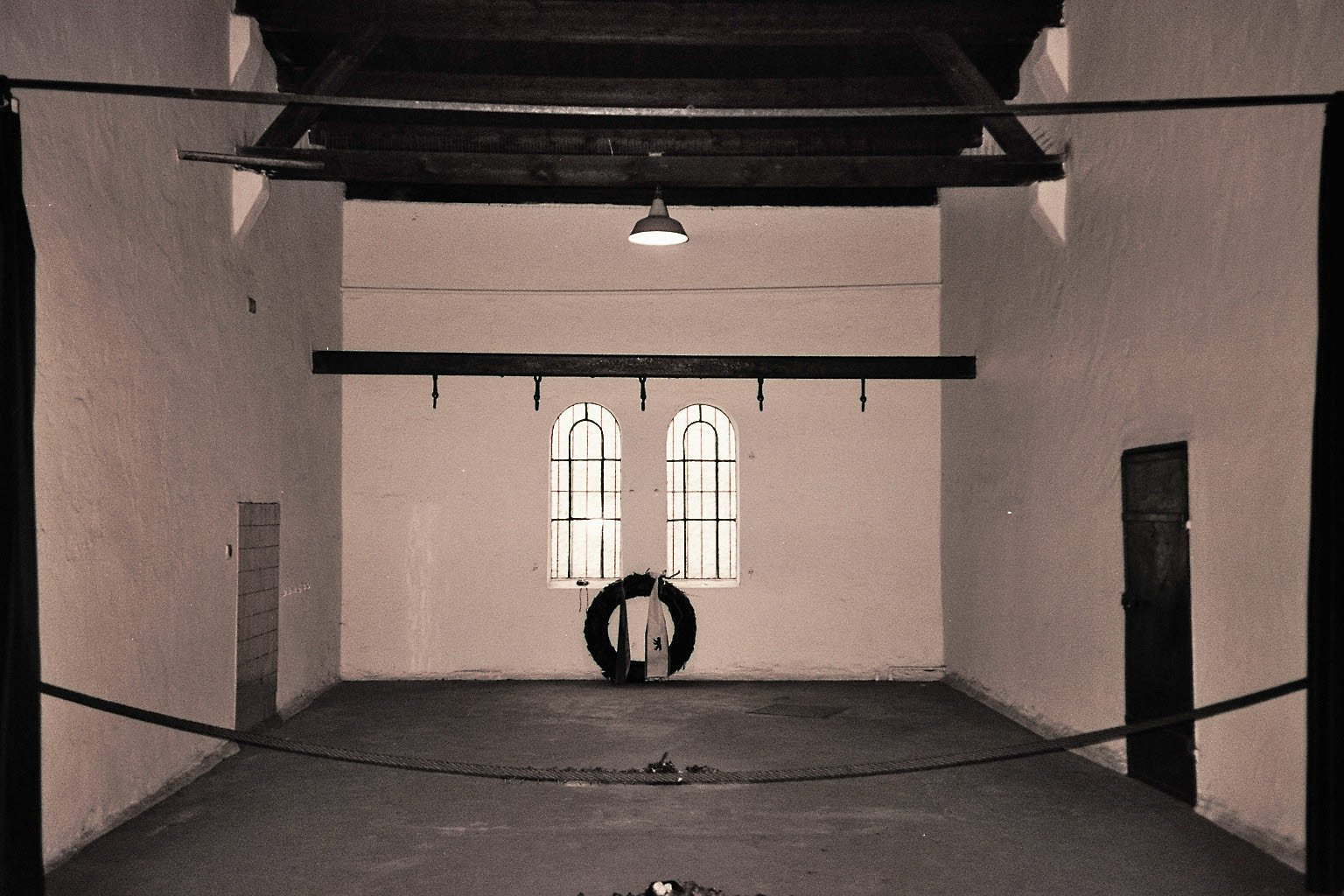
Plötzensee Memorial, 2005

During Imperial and Weimar Republic eras until 1933 there were 36 executions carried out in Plötzensee, all for murder and all by beheading with an axe according to the old German Strafgesetzbuch penal code. After the Nazi Machtergreifung, the prison housed both regular criminals and political prisoners. Plötzensee was one of eleven selected central execution sites established in 1936 throughout Germany by the order of Adolf Hitler and Reich Minister of Justice Franz Gürtner. Each was operated by a full-time executioner carrying out the rising numbers of death sentences, especially after the penal law was again tightened in World War II. By a 1943 agreement with the OKW they became also responsible for the execution of Wehrmacht members according to German military law. The convicts were beheaded by a stationary guillotine (Fallbeil), from 1942 also by hanging. During the Nazi regime, an official record of 2,891 people convicted by the Berlin Kammergericht, the notorious "People's Court" under Roland Freisler and several Sondergerichte, were executed in Plötzensee, initially with an axe in the prison's courtyard. From 1937 the convicts were beheaded with a guillotine brought from Bruchsal Prison and installed in a backyard work shed, a ground-level brick building near the prison walls, to where the victims had to walk from a nearby cell block. In 1942, a beam was assembled in the same room, serving as gallows for up to eight victims at one time. The bereaved were obliged to pay a fee of 1.5 ℛ︁ℳ︁ for each day the detainee had spent in prison plus an extra execution charge of 300 ℛ︁ℳ︁.

== Executions of opponents of the Nazi regime ==
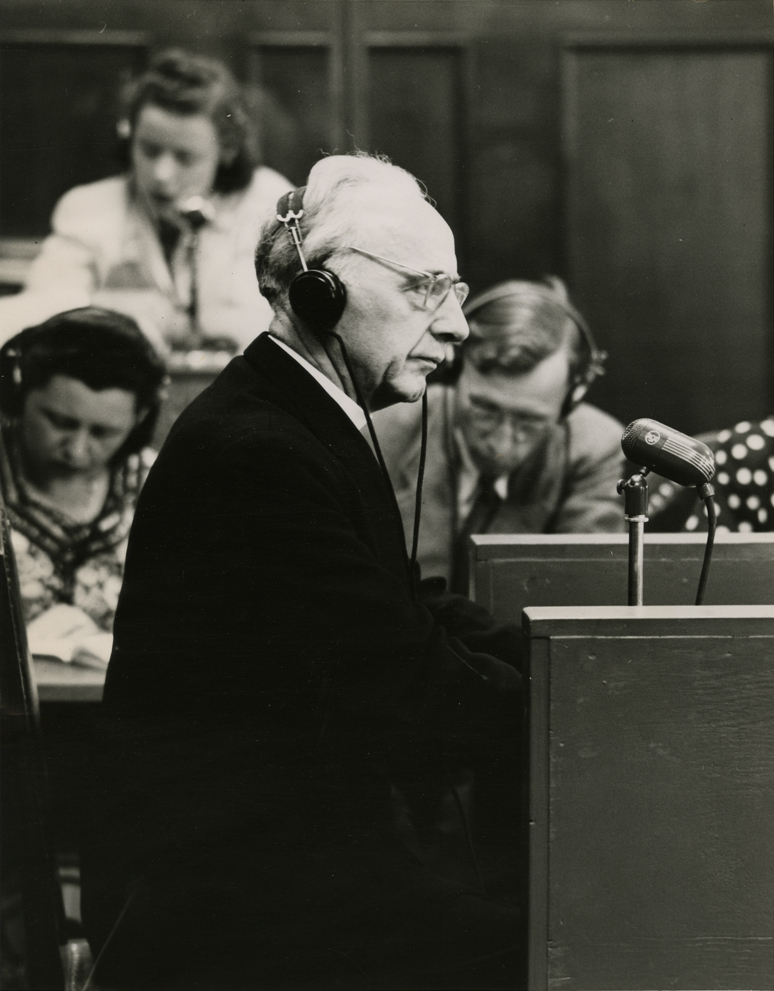
Peter Buchholz; "OMGUS MILITARY TRIBUNAL – CASE THREE OMT-III-W-56 / Witness Peter Buchholz, former prison chaplain at the Berlin-Plötzensee Prison, who described prison conditions there. He stated that there were people executed there during his time for whom stay of execution papers were in processing, perhaps even reprieve action."

About half of those executed were Germans, most of whom were sentenced to death for acts of resistance against the Nazi regime, among them members of the Red Orchestra, the 20 July plot and the Kreisau Circle. A total of 677 executed prisoners were from Czechoslovakia, among them many members of the Czech resistance to Nazi occupation from 1938 to 1939 onwards. A total of 253 death sentences were carried out against Poles, and 245 against French citizens. These people included both the members of resistance organizations and people who were deported to Germany for forced labour. About 300 were women.

After execution, their bodies were released to Hermann Stieve, an anatomist at the medical college of what is now Humboldt University of Berlin. He and his students or assistants dissected them for research purposes. Stieve was especially interested in the effects of stress on the menstrual cycle, and wrote 230 papers based on this research, among them one that demonstrated that the rhythm method was not an effective method of preventing conception.

After an RAF air raid in the night of 3 September 1943 irreparably damaged the guillotine and destroyed large parts of the prison buildings, State Secretary Curt Rothenberger in the Reich Ministry of Justice via telephone ordered the immediate execution of the Plötzensee condemned. About 250 people—six of them "erroneously"— waiting in rows of eight were hanged during the so-called Plötzensee Bloody Nights from 7 to 12 September. The last execution was carried out on 20 April 1945. The remaining inmates were liberated by the Red Army in the course of the Battle of Berlin five days later.

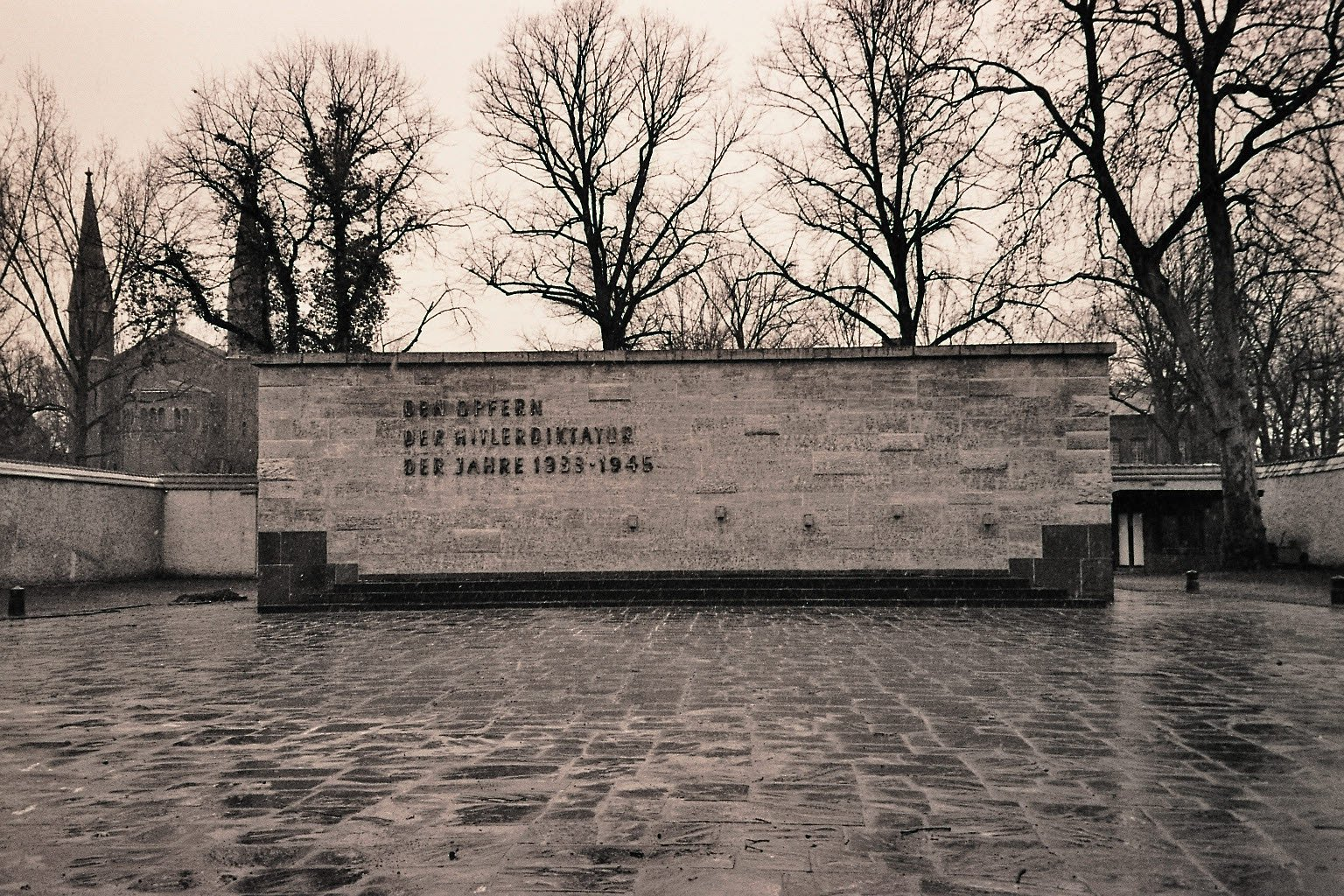
Memorial wall covering the execution shed

Today the execution shed is a memorial site operated by the Memorial to the German Resistance institution to commemorate those executed by the Nazis. Separated from the prison area, it was dedicated by the Senate of Berlin on 14 September 1952 in the remaining two rooms with its drain and the preserved gallows. The guillotine had been dismantled after the war and disappeared in the Soviet occupation zone. Onto the execution room a memorial wall was built "To the Victims of Hitler's Dictatorship of the Years 1933–1945". In 1963, the Catholic Diocese of Berlin erected its memorial for the victims about 2 km (1.2 mi) to the west in the commemorative church of Maria Regina Martyrum; the nearby Protestant Church of Plötzensee was inaugurated in 1970, featuring a Danse Macabre cycle (Plötzenseer Totentanz) by Alfred Hrdlicka. Both institutions are site of the annual Ecumenical Plötzensee Days. Several streets in the surrounding Charlottenburg-Nord housing estates were named after executed resistance fighters.

== Executed prisoners ==
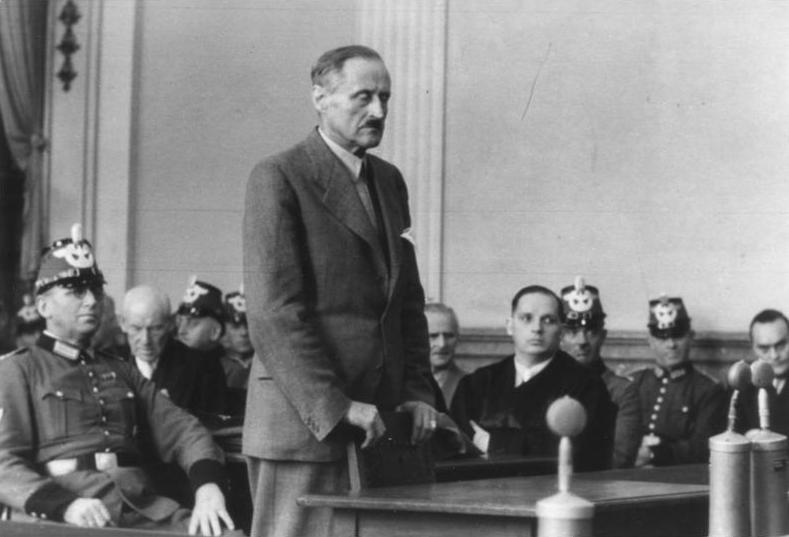
Ulrich von Hassell before the Nazi Volksgerichtshof, which condemned him to death in September 1944. Josef Wirmer is at the far right in the photo.

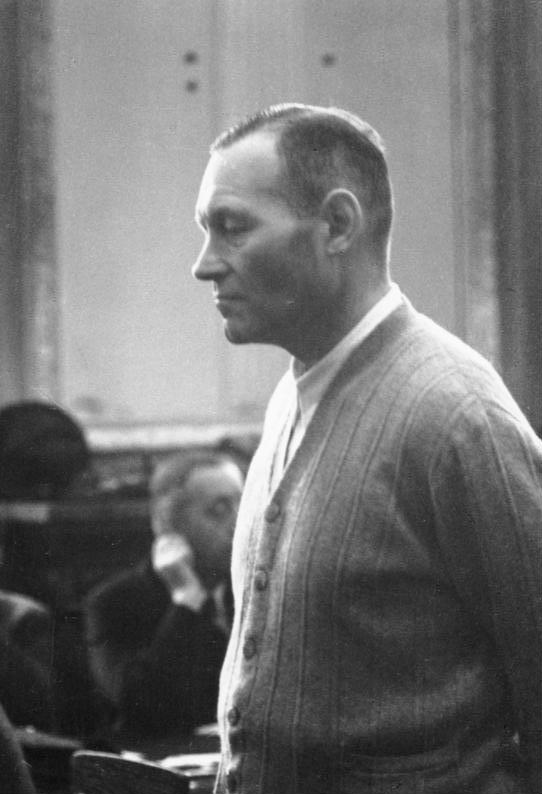
Hoepner at the Volksgerichtshof

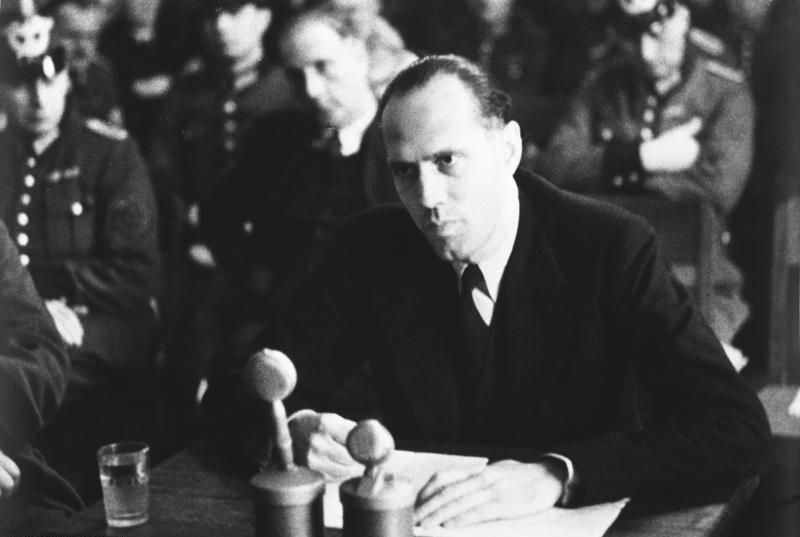
Moltke at the Volksgerichtshof

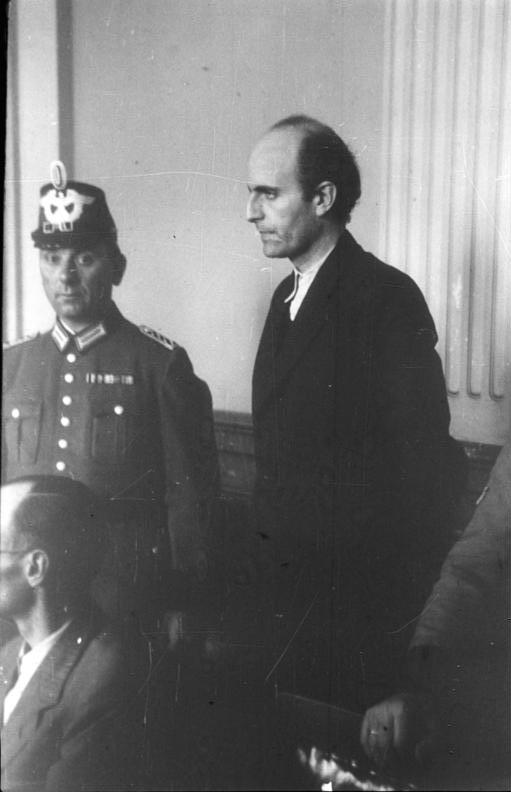
Adam von Trott zu Solz on trial following the 1944 bomb plot to assassinate Hitler

- Abdulla Aliş (1908–1944), poet who fought in World War II; beheaded
- Rita Arnould (1914–1943), resistance group member
- Judith Auer (1905–1944), resistance fighter; hanged
- Bernhard Bästlein (1894–1944), communist and resistance fighter
- Maurice Bavaud (1916–1941), failed assassin of Hitler; beheaded
- Marianne Baum (1912–1942), anti-Nazi convicted of treason following an attack in Berlin; beheaded
- Cato Bontjes van Beek (1920–1943), resistance fighter; beheaded
- Karl Behrens (1909–1943), engineer and resistance fighter
- Heinrich Belohlavek (1889–1943), Austrian footballer and resistance member; beheaded
- Liane Berkowitz (1923–1943), resistance fighter; beheaded
- Robert Bernardis (1908–1944), Austrian resistance fighter; was involved in a plot to assassinate Hitler
- Irena Bernášková (1904–1942), Czech resistance fighter and journalist; beheaded
- Hans-Jürgen von Blumenthal (1907–1944), aristocrat who conspired to assassinate Hitler
- Hasso von Boehmer (1904–1945), lieutenant colonel who plotted to assassinate Hitler
- Eugen Bolz (1881–1945), politician and resistance member
- Erika von Brockdorff (1911–1943), resistance fighter; beheaded
- Eduard Brücklmeier (1903–1944), diplomat and resistance fighter; hanged
- Eva-Maria Buch (1921–1943), resistance fighter; beheaded
- Musa Cälil (1906–1944), Soviet-Tatar resistance fighter; beheaded
- Hans Coppi (1916–1942), resistance fighter; married to Hilde Coppi; hanged
- Hilde Coppi (1909–1943), communist and resistance fighter; married to Hans Coppi; beheaded
- Alfred Corbin (1916–1943), resistance fighter
- Walter Cramer (1886–1944), businessman involved in the plot to assassinate Hitler; hanged
- Alfred Delp (1907–1945), Jesuit priest falsely implicated for plotting to overthrow Hitler
- Heinrich zu Dohna-Schlobitten (1882–1944), major general and resistance fighter
- Charlotte Eisenblätter (1903–1944), Anti-Nazi activist
- Hans Otto Erdmann (1896–1944), Army officer involved in the plot to assassinate Hitler; hanged
- Benita von Falkenhayn (1900–1935), baroness and spy; beheaded by axe
- Erich Fellgiebel (1886–1944), army general who plotted to assassinate Hitler
- Eberhard Finckh (1899–1944), colonel and resistance member; hanged
- Reinhold Frank (1896–1945), lawyer involved in the plot to assassinate Hitler; hanged
- Julius Fučík (1903–1943), journalist accused of high treason
- Willi Gall (1908–1941), communist and resistance fighter; beheaded
- Jakob Gapp (1897–1943), Austrian Roman Catholic priest and anti-Nazi activist; beheaded
- Charlotte Garske (1906–1943), political activist who opposed the Nazi government
- Erich Garske (1907–1943), husband of Charlotte
- Erwin Gehrts (1890–1943), socialist and resistance fighter; beheaded
- Erich and Elizabeth Gloeden, and Elisabeth Kuznitzky, entire family beheaded for sheltering a conspirator in 1944
- Carl Friedrich Goerdeler (1884–1945), politician who opposed the Holocaust; hanged
- Fritz Goerdeler (1886–1945), jurist and resistance fighter; hanged
- Ursula Goetze (1916–1943), resistance fighter; beheaded
- Helene Gotthold (1896–1944), Jehovah's Witness who opposed the Nazis; beheaded
- John Graudenz (1884–1942), journalist and resistance fighter; strangled
- Medardo Griotto (1901–1943), militant communist activist; beheaded
- Nikolaus Gross (1898–1945), Roman Catholic falsely arrested for the attempted assassination of Hitler
- Alfred Grünberg (1902–1942), Communist party member and resistance fighter; hanged
- Wilhelm Guddorf (1902–1943), Belgian journalist and resistance fighter
- Hans Bernd von Haeften (1905–1944), jurist who conspired to assassinate Hitler
- Albrecht von Hagen (1904–1944), jurist and resistance fighter; hanged
- Otto and Elise Hampel, couple who protested against the Nazis; beheaded
- Georg Hansen (1904–1944), Army colonel and resistance fighter; hanging
- Arvid Harnack (1901–1942), jurist and resistance fighter; beheaded
- Ernst von Harnack (1888–1945), Prussian official and resistance fighter
- Mildred Harnack (1902–1943), American teacher and resistance fighter; beheaded
- Paul von Hase (1885–1944), career soldier and resistance fighter; hanged
- Ulrich von Hassell (1881–1944), diplomat and resistance member; hanged
- Elli Hatschek (1901–1944), resistance member; beheaded
- Theodor Haubach (1896–1945), journalist and resistance fighter
- Egbert Hayessen (1913–1944), resistance fighter; hanged
- Wolf-Heinrich Graf von Helldorf (1896–1944), police official involved in the plot to assassinate Hitler; hanged
- Horst Heilmann (1923–1942), resistance fighter; hanged
- Marie-Louise Hénin (1898–1944), member of the Belgian Resistance; beheaded
- Albert Hensel (1895–1942), communist and resistance fighter
- Otto Herfurth (1893–1944), general involved in the plot to assassinate Hitler; hanged
- Liselotte Herrmann (1909–1938), communist resistance fighter; beheaded
- Helmut Himpel (1907–1943), dentist and resistance fighter; hanged
- Helmut Hirsch (1916–1937), German Jew arrested for taking part in a bombing; decapitated
- Erich Hoepner (1886–1944), General who conspired to assassinate Hitler
- Caesar von Hofacker (1896–1944), lieutenant colonel who plotted to assassinate Hitler; hanged
- Rosa Hofmann (1919–1943), Communist youth leader and resistance activist
- Bedřich Homola (1887–1943), Czech soldier and anti-Nazi commander
- Roland von Hößlin (1915–1944), army officer who plotted to assassinate Hitler
- Helmuth Hübener (1925–1942), youth who opposed the Nazi regime; was the youngest prisoner ever executed at age 17; beheaded
- Walter Husemann (1909–1943), communist and resistance fighter; beheaded
- Richard Hüttig (1908–1934), communist accused of attempted murder and breach of peace; beheaded by axe
- Hildegard Jadamowitz (1916–1942), communist activist
- Friedrich Gustav Jaeger (1895–1944), resistance fighter; hanged
- Heinz Joachim (1919–1942), anti-government resistance group member; married to Marianne Joachim
- Marianne Joachim (1921–1943), resistance fighter; married to Heinz Joachim
- Wanda Kallenbach (1902–1944), was charged with undermining the war and helping the enemy; beheaded
- Heinz Kapelle (1913–1941), YCLG member accused of high treason
- Walter Küchenmeister (1897–1943), machine technician and resistance fighter
- Otto Kiep (1886–1944), resistance fighter; hanged
- Johanna Kirchner (1889–1944), opponent of the Nazi regime; beheaded
- Hans Georg Klamroth (1898–1944), officer involved in the plot to assassinate Hitler
- Friedrich Klausing (1920–1944), resistance fighter who plotted to assassinate Hitler
- Ewald von Kleist-Schmenzin (1890–1945), lawyer who plotted to assassinate Hitler
- Theodor Korselt (1891–1943), jurist who negatively influenced Germany's fighting forces
- Alfred Kranzfelder (1908–1944), naval officer and resistance member; hanged
- Anna Krauss (1884–1943), fortune teller and resistance fighter; beheaded
- Karlrobert Kreiten (1916–1943), pianist accused of making negative remarks about Hitler; hanged
- Adam Kuckhoff (1887–1943), writer and resistance member
- Ingeborg Kummerow (1912–1943), office worker charged with aiding and abetting espionage; beheaded
- Carl Langbehn (1901–1944), lawyer and resistance member; hanged
- Krista Lavíčková (1917–1944), Czech secretary who fought against Nazism; beheaded
- Julius Leber (1891–1945), politician and resistance member
- Heinrich Graf von Lehndorff-Steinort (1909–1944), East Prussian aristocrat who plotted to assassinate Hitler; hanged
- Paul Lejeune-Jung (1882–1944), lawyer and resistance fighter; hanged
- Ludwig Freiherr von Leonrod (1906–1944), Army officer who plotted to assassinate Hitler; hanged
- Bernhard Letterhaus (1894–1944), unionist and Nazi resistance member
- Franz Leuninger (1898–1945), politician and resistance member
- Wilhelm Leuschner (1890–1944), trade unionist involved in the plot to assassinate Hitler
- Herta Lindner (1920–1943), resistance fighter
- Hans Otfried von Linstow (1899–1944), Army colonel who plotted to assassinate Hitler
- Hildegard Löwy (1922–1943), office worker and anti-Nazi resistance member; beheaded
- Ferdinand von Lüninck (1888–1944), officer involved in the plot to assassinate Hitler; hanged
- Mikhail Varfolomeevich Makarov (1915–c.1942), possibly; was a career spy
- Rudolf von Marogna-Redwitz (1886–1944), colonel who plotted to assassinate Hitler; hanged
- Hermann Maaß (1897–1944), resistance member
- Michael von Matuschka (1888–1944), politician who plotted to assassinate Hitler
- Basile Maximovitch (1902–c.1943), Russian aristocrat; beheaded
- Anna Maximovitch (1901–c.1943), Russian aristocrat and neuropsychiatrist;
- Joachim Meichssner (1906–1944), army officer and resistance member
- Herbert Michaelis (1898–1939), resistance member
- Helmuth James Graf von Moltke (1907–1945), jurist accused of treason
- Renate von Natzmer (1898–1935), spy; beheaded by axe
- Arthur Nebe (1894–1945), Nazi convicted of treason
- Eugen Neutert (1905–1943), communist and resistance fighter
- Johann Nobis (1899–1940), conscientious objector
- Véra Obolensky (1911–1944), French resistance fighter; beheaded
- Ruth Oesterreich (1894–1943), anti-government activist; hanged
- Paul Ogorzow (1912–1941), serial killer; beheaded
- Erwin Planck (1893–1945), politician and resistance fighter; hanged
- Johannes Popitz (1884–1945), Prussian finance minister and resistance member; hanged
- Karl Ernst Rahtgens (1908–1944), officer and resistance fighter; hanged
- Rudolf Redlinghofer (1900–1940), conscientious objector
- Friedrich Rehmer (1921–1943), factory worker and resistance fighter
- Adolf Rembte (1902–1937), communist and resistance fighter; beheaded
- Adolf Reichwein (1898–1944), educator who resisted German policies
- John Rittmeister (1898–1943), neurologist and resistance fighter; beheaded
- Alexis von Roenne (1903–1944), colonel accused of plotting to assassinate Hitler
- Galina Romanova (1918–1944), Ukrainian doctor and resistance fighter; beheaded
- Joachim Sadrozinski (1907–1944), Army officer who plotted to assassinate Hitler
- Lothar Salinger (1919–1943), resistant activist
- Rudolf von Scheliha (1897–1942), aristocrat and resistance fighter; hanged
- Rose Schlösinger (1907–1943), social worker and resistance fighter; beheaded
- Elfriede Scholz (1903–1943), dissident and possible resistance member; sister of Erich Maria Remarque; beheaded
- Oda Schottmüller (1905–1943), dancer and resistance fighter; beheaded
- Friedrich-Werner Graf von der Schulenburg (1875–1944), diplomat who plotted to assassinate Hitler; hanged
- Fritz-Dietlof von der Schulenburg (1902–1944), son of Friedrich-Werner; hanged
- Harro Schulze-Boysen (1909–1942), publicist convicted of high treason; married to Libertas Schulze-Boyson; hanged
- Libertas Schulze-Boysen (1913–1942), journalist and resistance fighter; married to Harro Schulze-Boysen; beheaded
- Elisabeth Schumacher (1904–1942), artist and resistance fighter
- Kurt Schumacher (1905–1942), anti-fascist group member; hanged
- Friedrich Schumann (1893–1921), serial killer; beheaded by axe
- Wilhelm Schürmann-Horster (1900–1943), marxist communist; hanged
- Ludwig Schwamb (1890–1945), jurist and resistance fighter; hanged
- Ulrich Wilhelm Graf Schwerin von Schwanenfeld (1902–1944), landowner and resistance fighter; hanged
- Gertrud Seele (1917–1945), nurse and social worker who helped Jews; beheaded
- Fritz Siedentopf (1908–1944), communist and resistance fighter; beheaded
- Franz Sperr (1878–1945), resistance member; hanged
- Günther Smend (1912–1944), officer who plotted to assassinate Hitler; hanged
- Robert Stamm (1900–1937), politician who conspired to commit treason; beheaded
- Berthold Schenk Graf von Stauffenberg (1905–1944), aristocrat who plotted to assassinate Hitler
- Helmuth Stieff (1901–1944), general involved in the plot to assassinate Hitler
- Ilse Stöbe (1911–1942), journalist and resistance fighter; beheaded
- Heinz Strelow (1915–1943), journalist and resistance fighter; beheaded
- Carl-Heinrich von Stülpnagel (1886–1944), General convicted of treason
- Maria Terwiel (1910–1943), resistance fighter; beheaded
- Elisabeth von Thadden (1890–1944), progressive educator and resistance fighter; beheaded
- Fritz Thiele (1894–1944), resistance member; hanged
- Fritz Thiel (1916–1943), engineer and resistance fighter; not the same man above
- Busso Thoma (1899–1945), major who plotted to assassinate Hitler; hanged
- Adam von Trott zu Solz (1909–1944), lawyer who conspired to assassinate Hitler
- Nikolaus von Üxküll-Gyllenband (1877–1944), businessman who conspired to assassinate Hitler
- Käte Voelkner (1906–1943)
- Peter Yorck von Wartenburg (1904–1944), jurist and resistance fighter
- Hermann Josef Wehrle (1899–1944), Catholic priest involved in the plot to assassinate Hitler
- Carl Wentzel (1875–1944), farmer involved in the plot to assassinate Hitler
- Josef Wirmer (1901–1944), jurist and resistance fighter; hanged
- Erwin von Witzleben (1881–1944), field marshal who conspired to assassinate Hitler
- Irene Wosikowski (1910–1944), political activist; beheaded
- Emmy Zehden (1900–1944), Jehovah's Witness and resistance member; beheaded
- Herbert Budzislawski (1920–1943), resistance fighter; hanged

== See also ==
- Brandenburg-Görden Prison

== Sources ==
- Oleschinski, Brigitte; Gedenkstätte Deutscher Widerstand (1994). Gedenkstätte Plötzensee (in German). Berlin: Gedenkstätte Deutscher Widerstand. ISBN 3-926082-05-4. OCLC 32033090.
- Cox, John M. (2009). Circles of resistance : Jewish, leftist, and youth dissidence in Nazi Germany. New York: Peter Lang. ISBN 978-1-4331-0557-9. OCLC 316736955.
