= Käte Voelkner =

German communist and resistance fighter (1906–1943)

- Käte Voelkner
- Born: 12 April 1906; Danzig, West Prussia, German Empire
- Died: 28 July 1943 (aged 37); Plötzensee Prison, Berlin, Nazi Germany
- Occupations: Circus acrobat, shorthand typist
- Known for: Informant and courier
- Espionage activity
- Allegiance: Red Orchestra
- Service years: 1939-1943

Käte Lydia Voelkner also known as Kathe Voelkner (12 April 1906 – 28 July 1943) was a German communist, anti-Nazi and resistance fighter. Voelkner became part of a Soviet espionage group that operated in Europe in World War II that would later be identified by the Abwehr as the Red Orchestra ("Rote Kapelle"). Originally a circus acrobat, Voelkner managed to obtain a key position as a shorthand typist in the Parisian office of Fritz Sauckel of the Arbeitseinsatz (Compulsory Labour Service) where she operated as an informant to the Red Orchestra's group's director Leopold Trepper.

== Life ==
Voelkner and her brother, the communist author Benno Voelkner came from a West Prussian working-class family of circus artists and contortionists from Danzig. Voelkner's mother was a circus artist and her father was a drawing teacher. Both were convinced social democrats. The family toured Europe and Russia extensively during the interwar period, living a hand-to-mouth existence, that often left them destitute. In 1925, Voelkner met the Italian artist and art teacher (Note: Hans Voelkner stated that he never learned the nationality of his father. Perrault states he was Italian.) Johann Podsiadlo while on tour and he eventually became her lover and manager. The couple had two sons, Hans and Henry. Their first son Hans Voelkner born 21 August 1928, would also become an espionage agent, for the GDR.

== Paris ==
In 1935, the family moved to Paris to live. At the start of World War II, the couple, living at 5 Impasse Rolleboise in Paris, were vehemently anti-nazi. Looking to resist, they both became involved in the French Resistance. To avoid being captured and interned, the couple received organisational help by people of the French Communist Party, fellow communists, who hid them in a safehouse in Ménilmontant, among the workers and trades people of the 20th arrondissement of Paris. During the early years of the phoney war, the couple learned shorthand and typing. Voelkner managed to secure a position, working as a secretary in the Parisian office of Fritz Sauckel in the work deployment group, located in the Chamber of Deputies. Podsiadlo managed to find work as an interpreter with the Organisation Todt. Their commitment to the Germans cost them, as their sons had to be sent to Hitler Youth camp in Germany, where they were trained to the ideal defined by Adolf Hitler.

While working, Voelkner met Basile Maximovitch, who was looking for a high-paying job in Sauckel's office and they became friends. He later introduced Voelkner to his sister Anna Maximovitch. The couple became close friends with Anna who invited them to stay at the Château Billeron with their two children. While there, Anna's brother, Basile Maximovitch evaluated them over a period of two weeks and suggested to Trepper that they be recruited. Trepper was suspicious of the Voelkners due to the Rue des Atrébates raid and it was some weeks before they were recruited in the autumn of 1941, by Anna Maximovitch. Maximovitch ran the "Artzin" espionage group, one of the seven espionage networks that constituted the Red Orchestra espionage network in Europe. Once Voelkner's position was established, she started to inform on Sauckel. Her mission was collect any salient confidential information on Nazi problems on satisfying manpower requirements. Voelkner shared her information on sheets of tissue paper that she smuggled out the office in her compact or between pages in a magazine or in a match box. The sheets were then passed to Suzanne Giraud, who as the cutout passed them to her husband, also a cutout, who delivered the information to Trepper at a treff.

Through Voelkner work, Trepper was kept informed about the chronic shortage of labour in France and about planned countermeasures. This included the number of foreign workers that have been recruited for each area the Germans have occupied, the industries they are being employed in as well as their use in German industry. Most importantly, the intelligence describes which industries are listed as a priority.

== Arrest ==
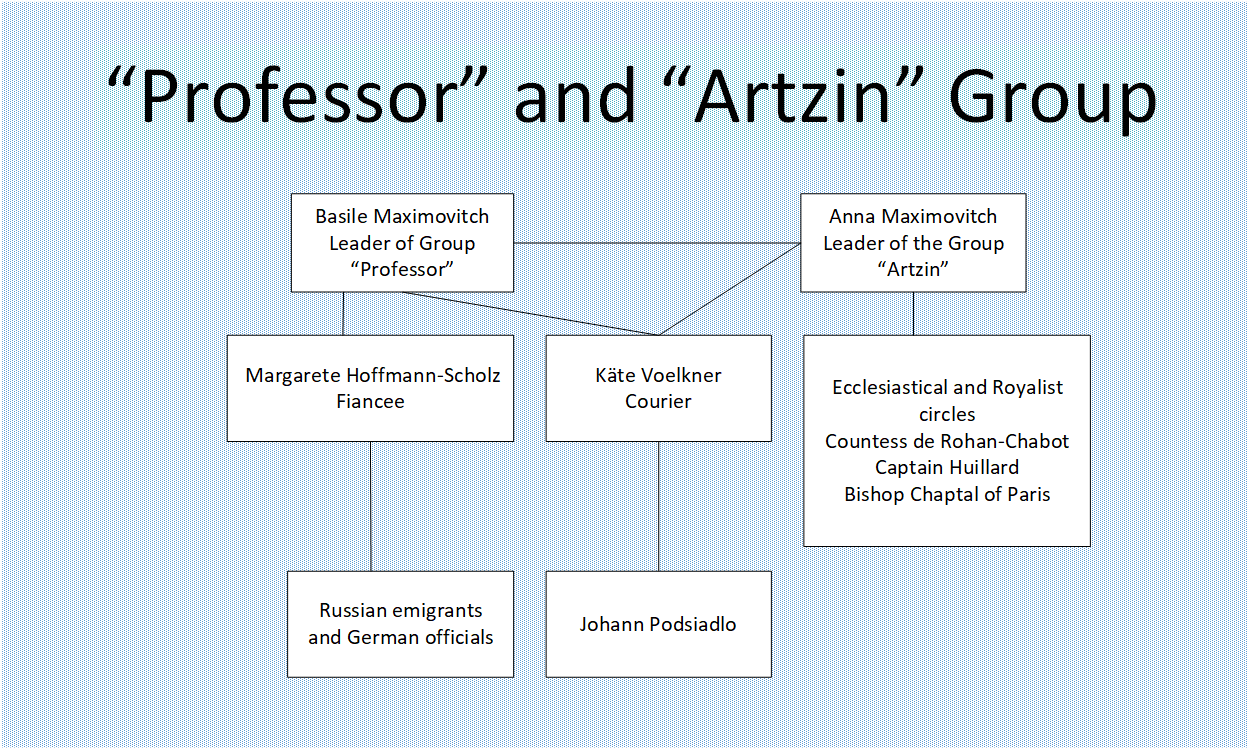
The Professor and Artzin espionage groups that constituted two of the seven networks in the Red Orchestra

Voelkner and Podsiadlo were both betrayed by Trepper on 7 January 1943. Voelkner was arrested at a treff on either 7 January 1943 or 31 January 1943 (sources vary) by the Gestapo operating from the Sonderkommando Rote Kapelle. On the 15 March 1943 after being tortured, she was sentenced to death by Manfred Roeder at the Reichskriegsgericht, the following month. When she was sentenced to death in the courtroom, Voelkner raised her fist and cried "I am happy to have been able to do a few things for communism". On the 28 July 1943, Voelkner and Podsiadlo were married in prison.

The children learned of their parents death while still in the Hitler Youth camp. Hans Voelkner was sent to Eastern Front in 1944 and deserted, caught and was sent to Bergen-Belsen concentration camp. He managed to survive the war. Henry Voelkner, still a child was sent to a SS children's home.

Voelkner was never provided a proper funeral. Instead her body suffered the indignity of being sent to the anatomist Hermann Stieve for medical research. Voelkner was one of 182 Red Orchestra people killed in Plötzensee Prison that had their bodies sent to Stieve. Of the 182 people, only one burial location is known and that is Mildred Harnack.

== Bibliography ==
- Bourgeois, Guillaume (2015). La véritable histoire de l'Orchestre rouge (in French). Paris: New World Editions. p. 584. ISBN 9782369420699.
- Coppi, Hans Jr. (July 1996). Dietrich Bracher, Karl; Schwarz, Hans-Peter; Möller, Horst (eds.). "Die Rote Kapelle" [The Red Orchestra in the field of conflict and intelligence activity, The Trepper Report June 1943] (PDF). Quarterly Books for Contemporary History (in German). 44 (3). Munich: Institute of Contemporary History. ISSN 0042-5702. Archived from the original (PDF) on 18 May 2015.
- Dallin, David J. (1955). Soviet Espionage. Yale University Press. ISBN 9780598413499.
- Hildebrandt, Sabine (January 2013). "The women on stieve's list: Victims of national socialism whose bodies were used for anatomical research". Clinical Anatomy. 26 (1): 3–21. doi:10.1002/ca.22195. hdl:2027.42/94885. PMID 23238847.
- Kesaris, Paul. L, ed. (1979). The Rote Kapelle: the CIA's history of Soviet intelligence and espionage networks in Western Europe, 1936-1945 (pdf). Washington DC: University Publications of America. ISBN 978-0-89093-203-2.
- Kil, Wolfgang (1989). "Voelkner, Hans". Bundesstiftung Aufarbeitung (in German). Berlin: Bundesstiftung zur Aufarbeitung der SED-Diktatur. Archived from the original on 9 February 2023.
- Perrault, Gilles (1969). The Red Orchestra. New York: Schocken Books. ISBN 0805209522.
- Perrault, Gilles (3 June 1968). "ptx ruft moskau – Fortsetzung Das Agenten-Netz in Frankreich" (in German). No. 23. Hamburg: Spiegel-Verlag. Der Spiegel. Archived from the original on 21 July 2019.
- Perrault, Gilles (11 February 1970). "Le meilleur des héritiers" (in French). Groupe Le Monde. Le Monde. Archived from the original on 7 February 2023.
