= Willi Gall =

German communist and resistance fighter (1908–1941)

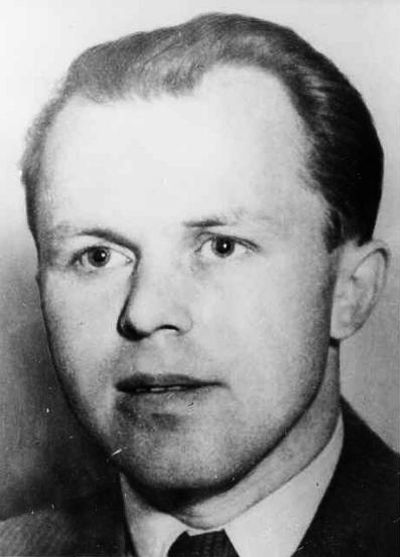
Willi Gall

Willi Gall (3 October 1908 – 25 July 1941) was a German communist and resistance fighter against Nazism.

== Biography ==
Gall was born in Falkenstein, Saxony. He worked as a lathe operator and a truck driver, and joined the Communist Party of Germany (KPD) in 1929. Active in the local KPD group in Pethau near Zittau, Gall was elected to the local city council in 1932.

After the Nazi Party came to power in 1933, Gall was active in the communist resistance. He emigrated to Czechoslovakia in April 1933, and served as a courier between Zittau and Prague from 1934 until 1938. In 1938, he worked as an instructor in the "Zentrum" leadership department of the underground KPD. In 1938–39, he went to Berlin illegally several times from Czechoslovakia and Denmark, where he produced leaflets, newspapers and held contacts with the workers of various factories and companies.

In December 1939, Gall was arrested along with over 100 resistance members from the Adlershof locality of Berlin. He was sentenced to death by the People's Court on 23 January 1941, and was executed by guillotine on 25 July 1941 in Plötzensee Prison in Berlin.

Today's Weinauparkstadion in Zittau was named Willi-Gall-Stadion from 1955 until 1990. A street in Mittelherwigsdorf outside Zittau is named Willi-Gall-Straße.
