= Alfred Grünberg =

German Communist (KPD) and resistance fighter (1902–1942)

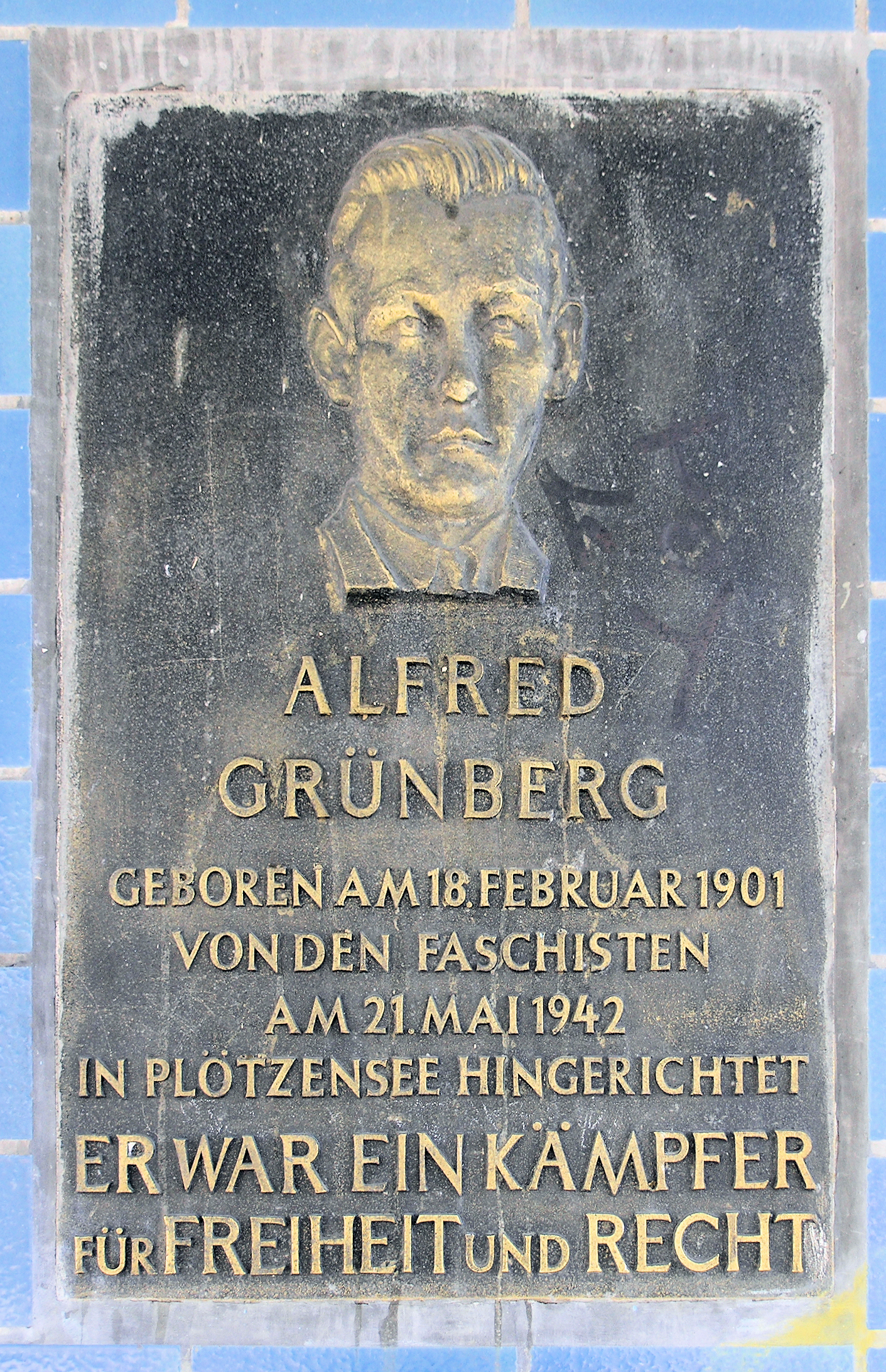
Memorial for Alfred Grünberg in Berlin-Bohnsdorf

Alfred Grünberg (18 February 1901 in Magdeburg – 21 May 1942 in Berlin) was a worker, a member of the Communist Party of Germany (KPD) and a resistance fighter against the Nazi régime.

== Life ==
Alfred Grünberg got involved quite early in the Communist youth movement, and in 1928, he joined the KPD in which he served as political leader of a street cell in Bohnsdorf, a Berlin neighbourhood nowadays part of Treptow-Köpenick, until 1933. He published many leaflets for the KPD and wrote letters to doctors and other professional people warning them about Hitler and his henchmen, and touting freedom.

After the KPD was banned in 1933 after Hitler and the Nazis came to power, he busied himself between 1936 and 1938 as a courier between Berlin and Prague for the KPD's political leadership in exile. As Grünberg was coming back to Bohnsdorf from Prague shortly before Christmas in 1938, he hid some writings that he had brought along at a feed dealer's, so that he could later hand them out on Christmas Eve to those to whose letterboxes they were destined, dressed as Santa Claus (or Father Christmas). After the war broke out in 1939, Grünberg was politically active at the Siemens works. He was arrested many times, but for good in February 1940. In January 1941, he was given a prison term of 15 months.

On 10 January 1942, he was sentenced to death at the Volksgerichtshof for high treason, along with Kurt Steffelbauer and Johann Gloger, and on 21 May 1942, he was hanged at Plötzensee Prison in Berlin.

Grünberg lived on Schönefelder Straße, which today bears the name Grünbergallee in his honour.
