= Joachim Meichssner =

German resistance fighter

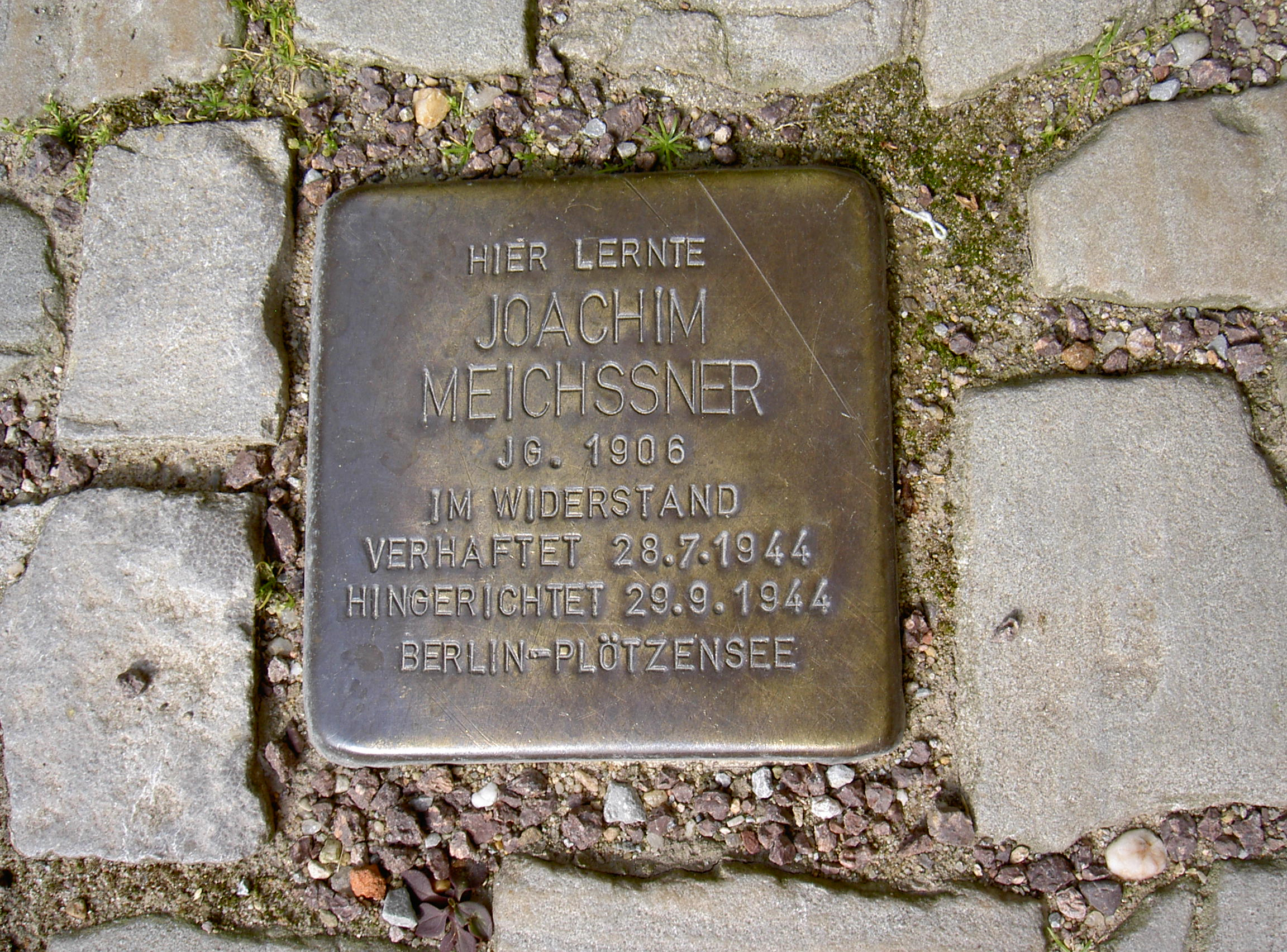
- Plaque for Joachim Meichssner
- Born: 4 April 1906; Deutsch Eylau, West Prussia, German Empire
- Died: 29 September 1944 (aged 38); Plötzensee Prison, Berlin, Nazi Germany
- Cause of death: Execution by hanging
- Military career
- Allegiance: Weimar Republic (to 1933); Nazi Germany
- Branch: Army
- Service years: 1924–1944
- Rank: Colonel
- Conflicts: World War II

Joachim Meichssner (4 April 1906 – 29 September 1944) was a German Army officer and member of the Resistance against the Nazi régime.

== Biography ==
Meichssner was born in Deutsch Eylau, West Prussia, German Empire (modern Iława, Poland). Since 1912 his father Maximilian worked as a teacher and ecclesiastical supervisor at Schulpforta, where Meichssner also attended school. He volunteered the Reichswehr in 1924 as an officer cadet. Starting in 1935 he was trained for staff duties at the War Academy of Berlin. In September 1937 he was shifted to the Army High Command. In 1940 he became the 1st general staff officer and group chief in the General Army Office (Allgemeines Heeresamt) under General Friedrich Olbricht. Here he became involved in the military conspiracy against Hitler.

After a deployment at the eastern front, Meichssner became Chief of the Organization Department of the Armed Forces Command in 1943 and as such had direct, though sporadic, access to Hitler. In September 1943 Colonel Helmuth Stieff informed Meichssner about the plans to kill Hitler in a suicide attack and tried to convince him to carry out such an attempt; however, Meichssner finally refused after his father had discouraged him for religious reasons and because he “could not bear the stress of waiting”.

The plotters around Claus von Stauffenberg now chose Axel von dem Bussche to kill Hitler in a suicide attack during a demonstration of new winter uniforms, a plan that failed after the uniforms had been destroyed in an Allied air raid.

Meichssner was deployed at Potsdam during the 20 July plot; initially his involvement in the coup remained undetected but his father, a member of the Confessional Church in Wittenberg, was arrested by the Gestapo on 21 July 1944. A week later Joachim Meichssner was also arrested. He was sentenced to death by the Volksgerichtshof on 29 September 1944 and immediately executed at Plötzensee Prison alongside Joachim Sadrozinski, Fritz von der Lancken, Wilhelm-Friedrich zu Lynar and Otto Herfurth.
