= Karl Ernst Rahtgens =

German Wehrmact officer and resistance fighter (1908–1944)

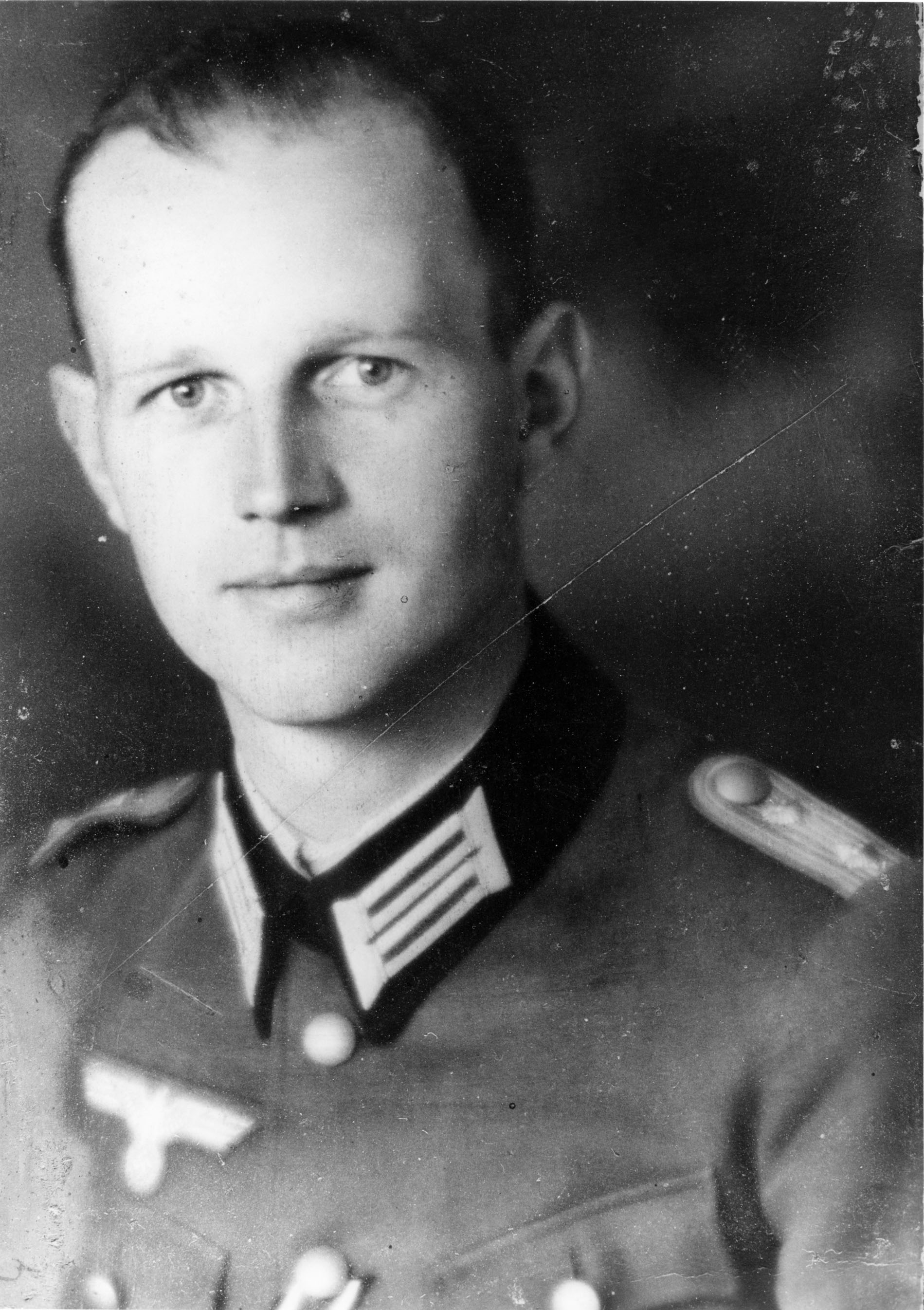
Karl Ernst Rahtgens

Karl Ernst Rahtgens (27 August 1908 – 30 August 1944) was a German officer in the Wehrmacht during World War II, and an active resistance fighter against the Nazi régime.

Born in Lübeck, he was married to Johanna Helene Rahtgens, née von Cramon. His uncle was Field Marshal Günther von Kluge.

Rahtgens, who held the rank of oberstleutnant, was arrested in Belgrade for his involvement in the 20 July plot to assassinate Adolf Hitler. He was sentenced to death on 30 August 1944 by the Volksgerichtshof and was hanged later the same day at Plötzensee Prison in Berlin.

== Sources ==
- Plötzensee Prison
