= Dagobert Biermann =

- Born: 13 November 1904; Hamburg, Germany
- Died: 22 February 1943 (aged 38); Auschwitz
- Occupations: Communist and resistance fighter

Dagobert Biermann (13 November 1904 – 22 February 1943) was a German Communist and resistance fighter against National Socialism. His son is German singer and former East German dissident Wolf Biermann. He was murdered in Auschwitz.

== Background ==
Dagobert Biermann was born in Hamburg to Louise (née Löwenthal) and John Biermann. Biermann was Jewish. He and his wife, Emma (née Dietrich), were members of the Communist Party of Germany (KPD). Before the Nazis seized power, a time when the KPD held the Social Democrats (SPD) in disdain, Biermann believed there should be unity between the KPD and the SPD.

== Resistance activity ==
After Adolf Hitler seized power, Biermann went underground, and published the Hamburger Volkszeitung ("Hamburg Peoples' Newspaper"). He and his group were discovered, and Biermann was sentenced to two years at hard labor at Zuchthaus Lübeck, where he met the lawyer, Herbert Michaelis, and the lathe operator, Bruno Rieboldt. Biermann was released in May 1935, and found employment as a metalworker at Howaldtswerke-Deutsche Werft on the waterfront, along with Rieboldt, who was also released. Biermann re-joined the KPD, and resumed working with the German Resistance.

Biermann and Riebodt began working with Michaelis, with Rieboldt reporting to him about the armaments work, and especially about the production of airplane motors and warships. In 1937, the Resistance group disclosed a secret weapons shipment from Adolf Hitler to Spain's Francisco Franco. Biermann learned of the shipment from his brother-in-law, Karl Dietrich, a ship captain. Biermann and other shipyard workers decided to collect whatever evidence they could of the shipment bound for Spain. Michaelis had contacts living abroad, in exile, who could help spread the word. One example of evidence was discovered in March 1937, when Dietrich slipped two unusual rifle cartridges to Biermann. Unlike normal munitions, these cartridges were unmarked, having no indication of manufacturer, date, or type of bullet. Michaelis passed such information, along with reports of ship movements towards Spain and other materials, to the head of the KPD in Basel, where it was then made public.

At the same time, leaflets and graffiti calling for solidarity with the Republicans in the Spanish Civil War began to appear at the harbor. A Gestapo spy managed to infiltrate the Resistance group, and Biermann and others were arrested. Biermann was charged with sabotaging Nazi ships. Michaelis was sentenced to death by the Volksgerichtshof in 1939, even before the beginning of the Second World War. Biermann and others were sentenced to prison, Biermann receiving six years. In 1942, the Nazis decided to eliminate their Jewish political prisoners, and Biermann was deported to Auschwitz concentration camp, where he was murdered on 22 February 1943.

== Commemoration ==
Biermann is included in the Ernst Thälmann Memorial, and in the book, Streiflichter aus dem Hamburger Widerstand 1933-1945.
