= Wanda Kallenbach =

German housewife executed for making complaints about the government (1902–1944)

Wanda Kallenbach (born Wanda Möhring: 13 June 1902 – 18 August 1944) was a German housewife who complained about the government. The next year, on 20 April 1944, she faced criminal charges for undermining the war effort and helping the enemy ("Wehrkraftzersetzung und Feindbegünstigung"). She faced trial at the special "People's Court" on 21 June 1944 and was executed on the guillotine at Plötzensee a couple of months later.

The opening up of Stasi archives after 1990 provided access to large amounts of information about the National Socialist years that had hitherto not been available to researchers and the wider public. Documents that had survived the war concerning Kallenbach's imprisonment and trial had been carefully archived and put away by the East German authorities, presumably while the region was still being administered as the Soviet occupation zone. A Berlin street was named after Kallenbach in 2006. Since then she has become a named victim of the Hitler government, invoked to represent thousands of others whose names remain lost to history.

== Biography ==
Wanda Möhring was born in Jankedorf, which at that time was a village in Kreis Kolmar (Posen), and between 1871 and 1919 part of Germany. In 1918/19 Jankendorf became part of Sokołowo Budzyńskie in the Polish Budzyń Voivodeship, in the countryside north of the city now known as Poznań. While she was still young Wanda Möhring left her family and moved to Berlin to find work, first in domestic service and later as a packer. For a time (according to evidence presented at her trial in 1944) she was a member of a trades union. Later she married the truck driver Fritz Kallenbach. Their daughter Inge was born in 1933.

After the outbreak of war in 1939 Wanda Kallenbach's home region again became part of Germany. In August 1943 she visited her sister in their home region, now identified on up to date maps as the Reichsgau Wartheland. She arrived in the village with tales of the horrors of the ever more frequent Anglo-American bombing of the German capital. She complained to friends old and new about Reichsmarschall Göring, the man in charge of the air force who had assured people back in 1939 that Germany would never be hit by enemy bombs. When she was asked what "little people" could do about the situation she pointed out that if all the soldiers threw aside their weapons the war would soon come to an end. On another occasion, when a villager greeted her with the "Hitler greeting" (Nazi salute), the woman from the big city commented sharply that if you did that in Berlin now you would get a punch in the mouth ("... eins in die Schnauze").

Kallenbach had been back in Berlin for some months on 20 January 1944 when she was arrested by the Gestapo. Someone in Jankedorf had denounced her. There were other accusations too: it had been reported that she had had trades union connections before the war and that she had become involved in "Jew friendliness" ("Judenfreundlichkeit"). The state prosecutor issued formal charges against Wanda Kallenbach on 20 April 1944 by the state prosecutor, alleging that she had been undermining the war effort and helping the enemy ("Wehrkraftzersetzung und Feindbegünstigung").

She faced trial on 21 June 1944. The presiding judge was the president of the court, Roland Freisler (1893–1945). Herbert Linden (1899–1945), a senior ministerial official with a medical background, chiefly remembered by posterity for his organising role in the T4 Mass-murder project, sat alongside Freisler as honorary assessor ("... ehrenamtlichen Beisitzer"). The case was prosecuted by Karl Bruchhaus (1903–1980). The prosecution case made reference to Kallenbach's trades union membership before 1933 (though there is nothing in the sources about anyone suggesting that trades union membership had been illegal before 1933). It included the accusation that after 1933 she "stood out on account of her Jew-friendly approach" ("... durch ihre judenfreundliche Einstellung aufgefallen"). It included the assessment of her local party that she was "politically flawed" ("politisch nicht einwandfrei"). The prosecution case quoted an ethnic German living in Jankedorf who had reported that Kallenbach had said of the food shortages in Berlin that they must be even worse than the folk in Jankendorf had experienced in the "Polish time" (Note: "...könnt ihr es in der Polenzeit auch nicht gehabt haben.") (before the area had reverted to German control in 1939). It was noted that she had criticized government leaders for false promises given at the start of the war about the supposed safety of the people. Her spontaneously critical reaction when someone in the village greeted her with the "Hitler greeting" (Nazi salute) was also included as part of the prosecution case.

The defence placed emphasis on Wanda Kallenbach's "limited intelligence". Neighbours, it was explained, found her unfailingly helpful and friendly, but "somewhat naive". Judge Freisler, who enjoyed taunting the people who appeared before him, joined in with the observation that she "could not count up to three". Then the hearing was interrupted by an air raid alarm, and everyone hurried down together to the bomb shelter - lawyers, court officials, witnesses, people who had come to see the trial and the accused. One man who had come to watch the trial was Dr. Wilhelm Harnisch, the pastor from the Samaritan Church and a member of the Confessing Church. Harnisch had a particular interest in the case because he had taken in Inge Kallenbach to live with his own family. Harnisch took advantage of their enforced confinement underground to plead with Prosecutor Bruchhaus that, for the sake of her child, Wanda Kallenbach's life should be spared. A little after that the trial resumed and concluded in the court room. Wanda Kallenbach was pronounced guilty and sentenced to death "for the security of our home-front and thereby of our victory" (Note: "... um der Festigkeit unserer inneren Front und damit um unseres Sieges willen.")

Fritz Kallenbach, her husband, did not give up. With the support of the family doctor he provided testimony to the court that Wanda had been suffering from depression ("seelische Störungen") and appealed for the death sentence to be replaced with a jail sentence. Pastor Harnisch wrote a letter directly to Adolf Hitler appealing for clemency on account of the child who was about to be orphaned. But the government was in a state of heightened nervousness after an attempt to assassinate the leader came close to success, and the appeals on behalf of Wanda Kallenbach, if they had any effect, served only to hasten her execution, which took place on the guillotine at Plötzensee Prison.

It was only in 1998, when the Law to repeal National Socialist injustices in the criminal justice system came into force, that the judgment against Kallenbach was formally reversed.

== Celebration ==
In 2006 the local council named a street leading to the Mercedes-Benz Arena as the "Wanda-Kallenbach-Straße".

== Karl Brockhaus ==
Prosecutor Bruchhaus survived the end of the war, but retired early, without loss of pension, from a post as senior prosecutor at Wuppertal in 1961. He was presumably still alive in 1980 when the Union of Persecutees of the Nazi Regime launched a criminal complaint against him, but the matter was never taken forward. The date of his death is not known.
