= Heinrich Belohlavek =

Austrian footballer and political prisoner (1889–1943)

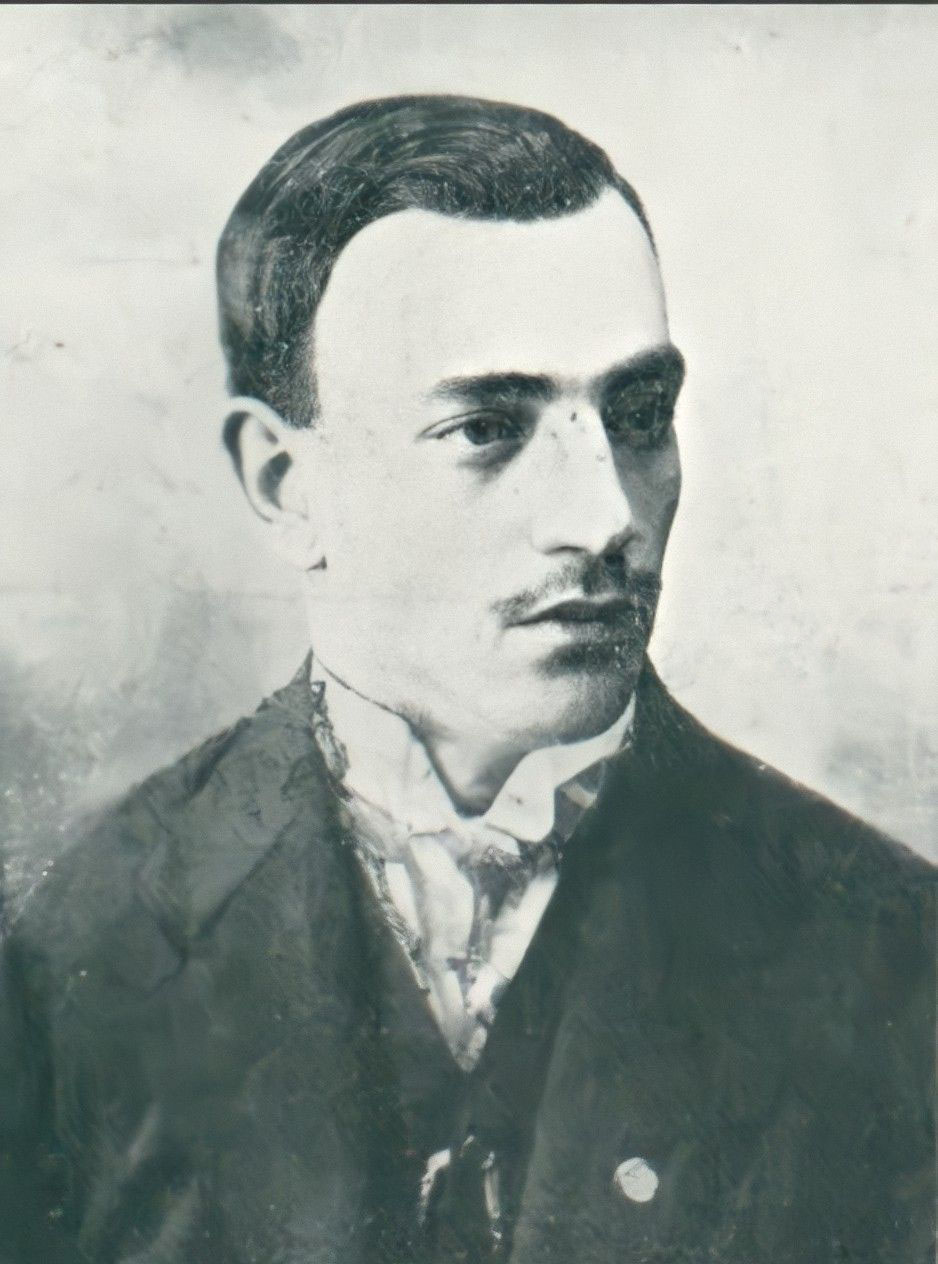
- Heinrich Belohlavek

Personal information
- Date of birth: 26 September 1889
- Place of birth: Vienna, Austria
- Date of death: 2 March 1943 (aged 53)
- Place of death: Charlottenburg, Berlin, Germany
- Position: Midfielder

Senior career*
Years	Team	Apps	(Gls)
- SC Rudolfshügel

International career
1910	Austria	1	(0)
- * Club domestic league appearances and goals

Heinrich Belohlavek (26 September 1889 – 2 March 1943) was an Austrian amateur footballer who played as a midfielder. He died as a political prisoner of Nazi Germany in the Second World War.

== Football career ==
He made one appearance for the Austria national team in 1910.

== Life outside football ==
Belohlavek was an industrial iron turner by trade, who served in the First World War in the depot of a railway regiment of the Austro-Hungarian Army. He was a member of the Austrian Social Democratic Party until its abolition in 1934. He was an opponent of the Austrofascist regime, under which he was detained on suspicion of 'Marxist activity' and later of the Nazi German authority following the Anschluss of 1938. In 1941 he was arrested for running a cell of the outlawed Austrian Communist Party in his factory workplace when caught collecting funds (which he protested were to aid prisoners' families) and was imprisoned ultimately at Plotzensee Prison in Berlin. He and six others arrested with him were executed by beheading at the prison after being sentenced to death.
