= Herbert Budzislawski =

Anti-nazi resistance fighter executed

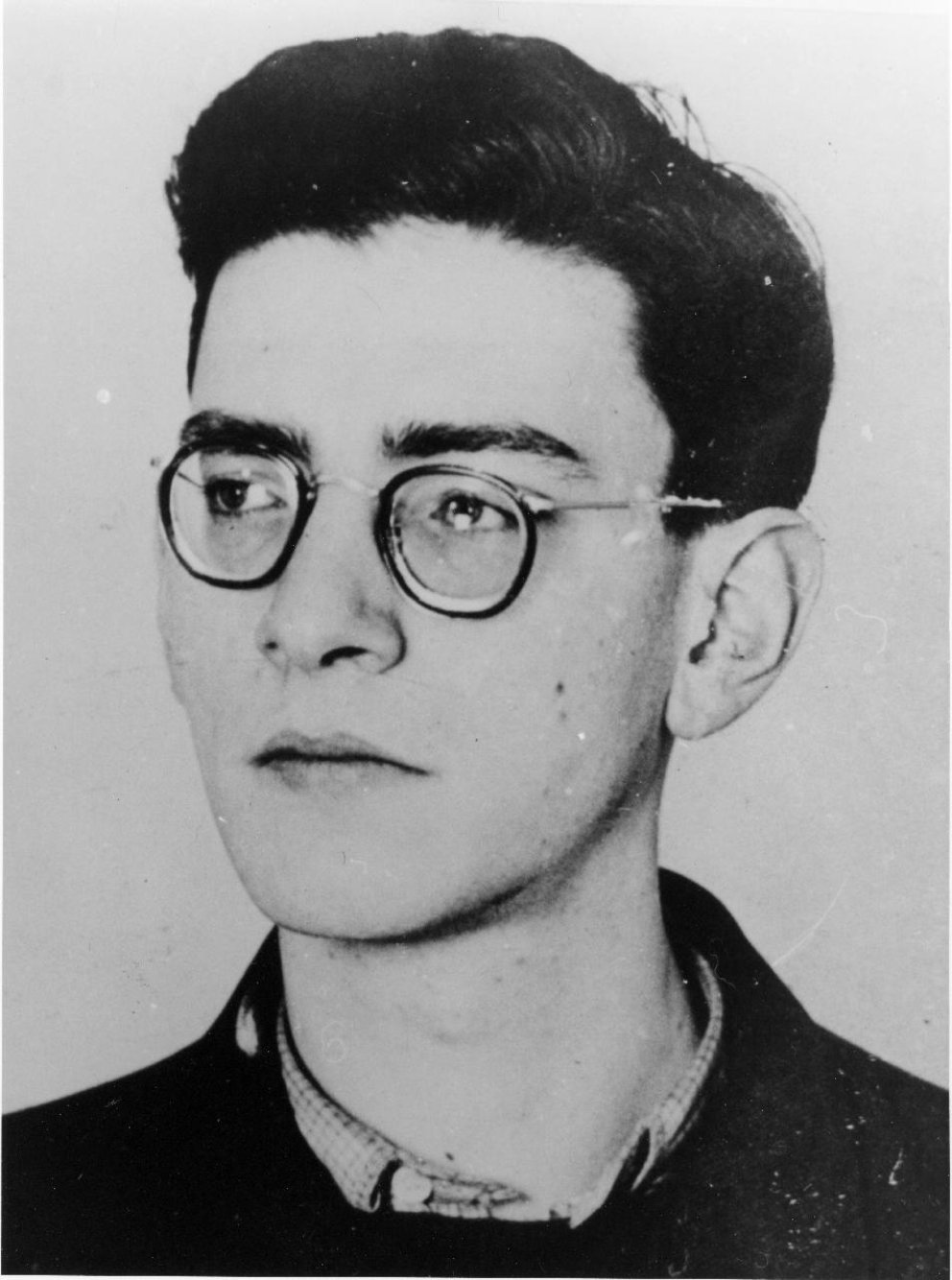
- Born: 30 December 1920; Berlin, Germany
- Died: September 7, 1943 (aged 22)

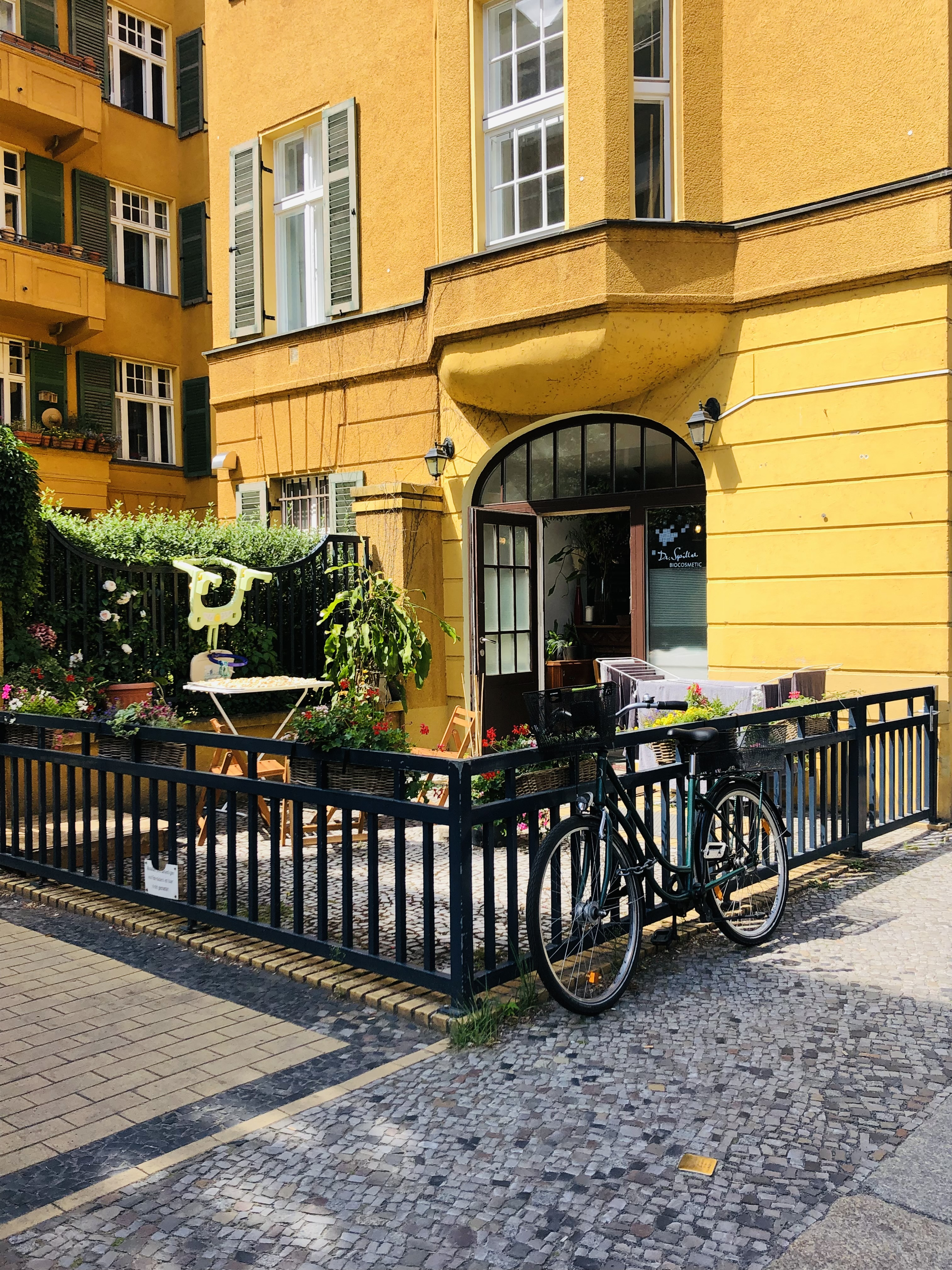
Herbert Budzislawskis memoriał stone in front of his apartment building in Berlin in the lower right corner.

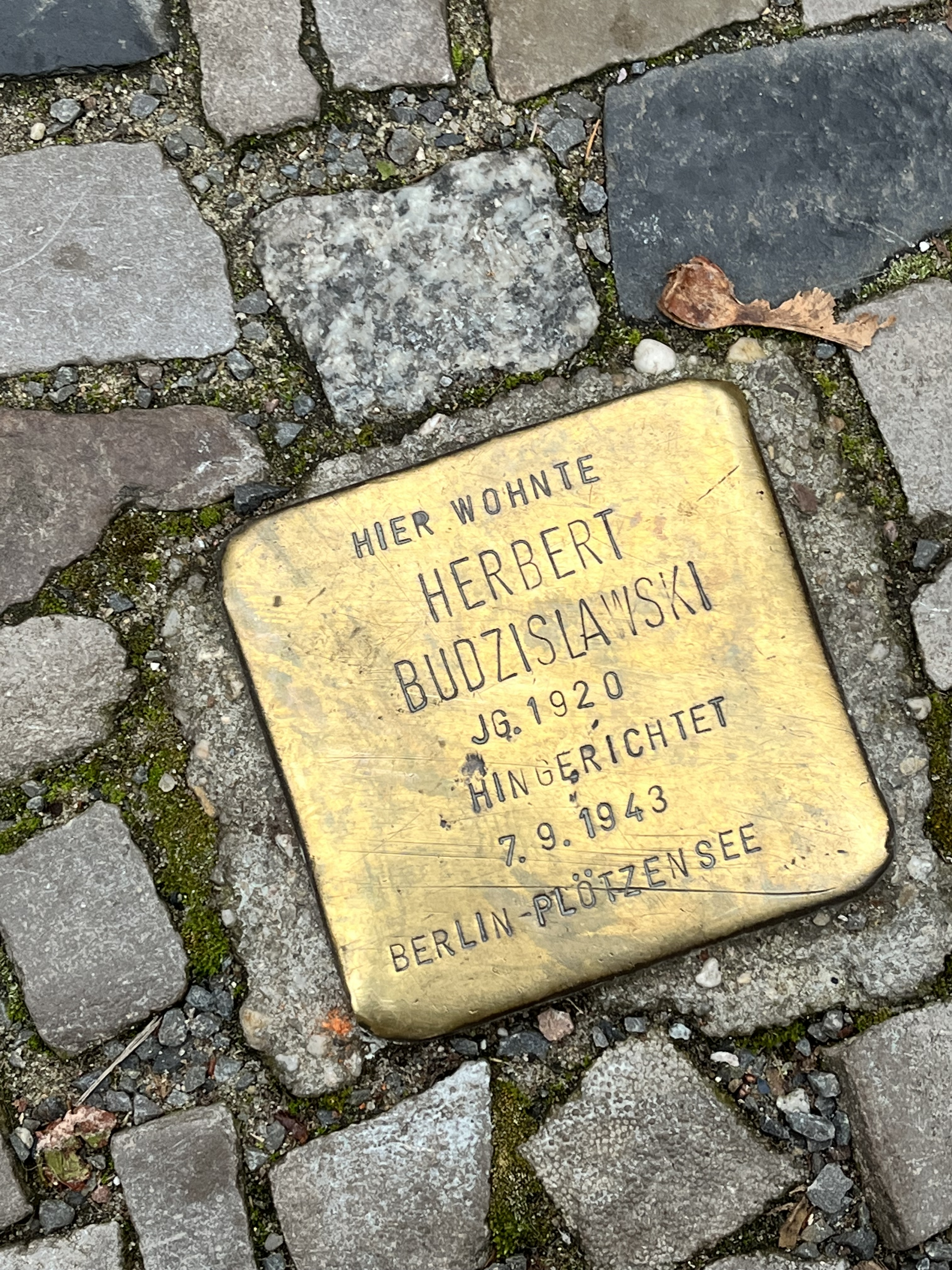
Herbert Budzislawski's memoriał stone close up.

Herbert Budzislawski (December 30, 1920 – September 7, 1943) was a German-Jewish resistance fighter and a member of the Herbert Baum Group, an anti-fascist resistance organization in Nazi Germany. He was arrested in 1942, sentenced to death for high treason by the Volksgerichtshof (People's Court) in June 1943, and murdered at Plötzensee Prison during the Bloody Nights of Plötzensee in September 1943.

== Early life and education ==
Budzislawski was born in Berlin on December 30, 1920, into a Jewish family. His father died when he was 11 years old, leaving his mother as the family's sole provider. After the Nazi rise to power in 1933, his life became increasingly restricted due to antisemitic laws. He was forced to leave school early due to education restrictions against Jews and began training as a metalworker and later as a construction laborer.

== Sexual orientation and Gestapo surveillance ==
Budzislawski was openly gay, which was highly dangerous under the Nazi regime. Homosexuality was criminalized under Paragraph 175 of the German Penal Code, and gay men were frequently arrested and sent to prison or concentration camps. His sexual orientation, combined with his Jewish background and political affiliations, led to Gestapo surveillance as early as 1938.

== Resistance activities and the Herbert Baum Group ==
The Herbert Baum Group was a Jewish-communist anti-fascist resistance movement operating in Berlin. The group distributed leaflets, encouraged sabotage, and carried out acts of defiance against Nazi propaganda.

Their most notable act was the arson attack on the anti-Soviet Nazi propaganda exhibition Das Sowjetparadies (The Soviet Paradise) on May 18, 1942. Following the attack, the Gestapo launched a large-scale crackdown on suspected resistance members, leading to dozens of arrests and executions.

Budzislawski was arrested in November 1942 and accused of high treason and aiding the enemy (Hochverrat und Feindbegünstigung) due to his association with members of the Herbert Baum Group.

== Trial and sentencing ==
Budzislawski was tried before the Volksgerichtshof (People's Court) on June 29, 1943, a show tribunal known for politically motivated trials and mass death sentences.

The court explicitly framed his Jewish identity as part of its judgment, describing him as a Volljude (full Jew) and claiming that he was part of a Jewish-Bolshevik conspiracy against the Nazi regime. Nazi legal documents emphasized his Jewish heritage and alleged communist ties as justification for sentencing him to death.

== Clemency appeal and final plea ==
Following his sentencing, Budzislawski submitted a clemency appeal on July 27, 1943, to the Senior Reich Prosecutor at the People's Court. In his letter, he described how Nazi policies had deprived him of education, work, and social connections, citing the dissolution of Jewish youth groups and restrictive social laws as factors that left him isolated.

The court documents shows that he denied any involvement in violence, stating that his association with resistance members was purely social and that he had simply sought companionship, not political activism. He also emphasized that his father had wanted him to see Germany as his homeland, a direct challenge to Nazi racial ideology.

His clemency request was denied, and his execution was ordered.

== Execution and the Bloody Nights of Plötzensee ==
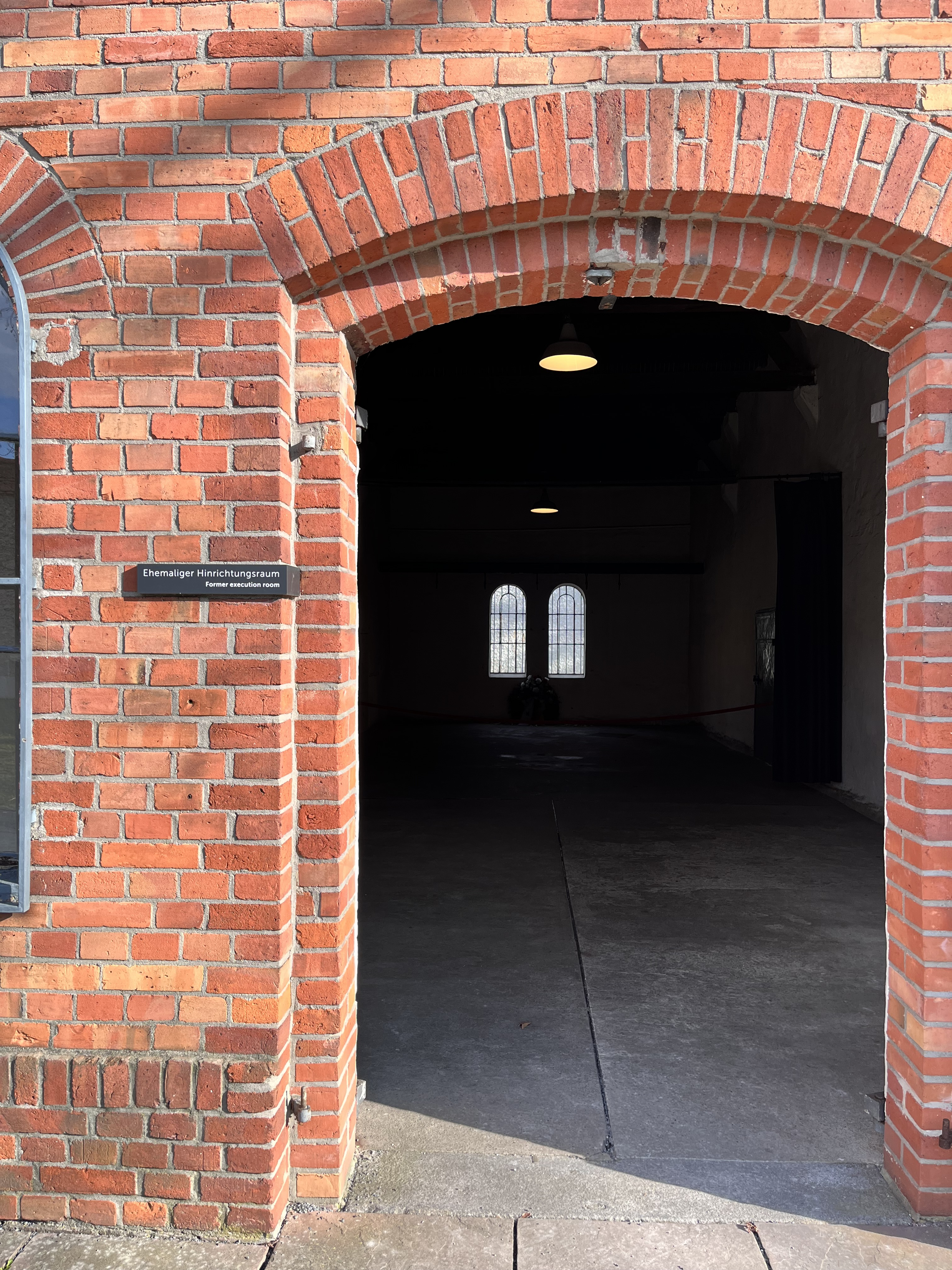
Entrance of the Plötzensee execution room. Today, it is a public memorial.

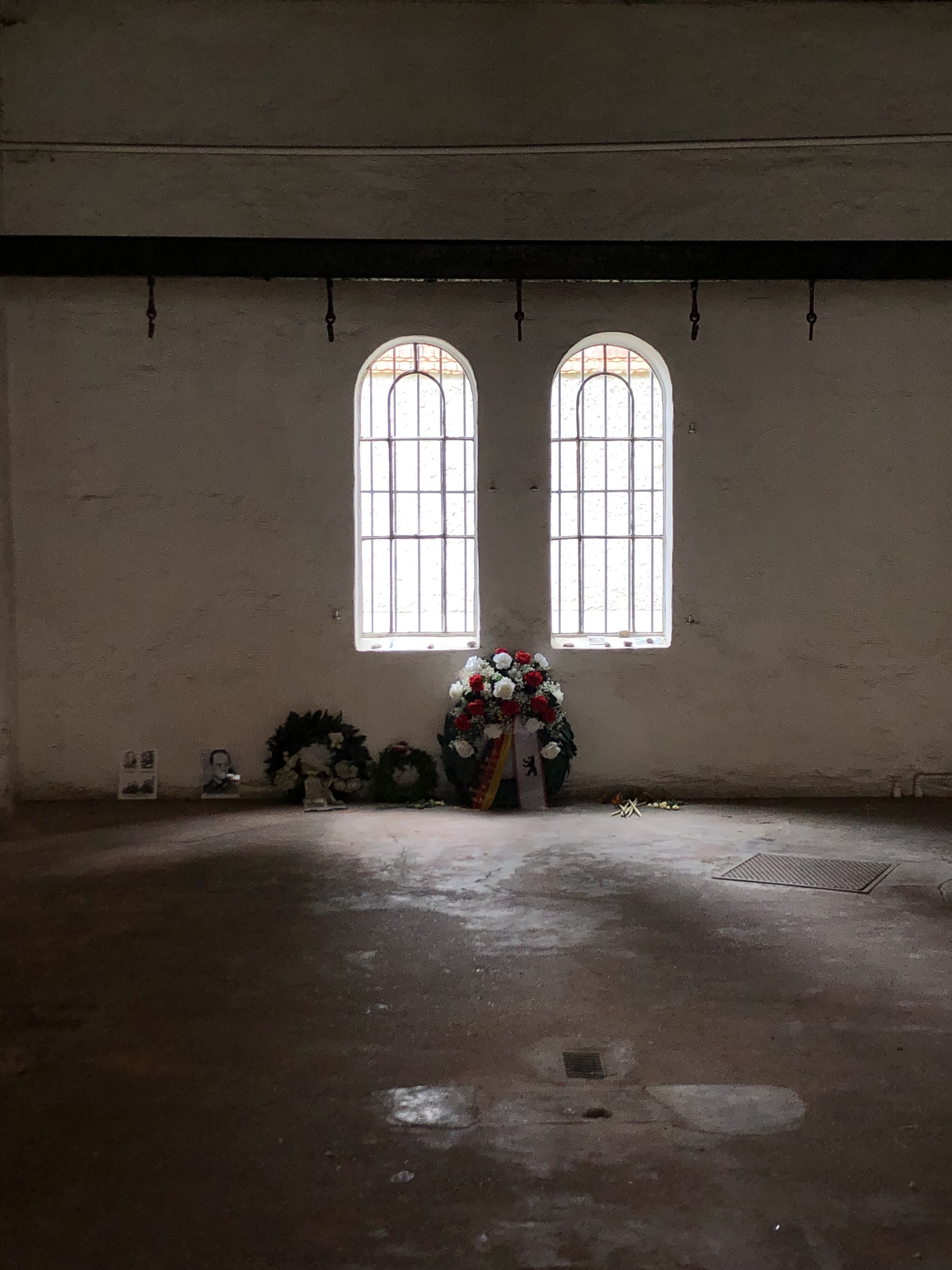
Former execution room at Plötzensee. The steel beams with meat hooks were added to speed up executions and hang several prisoners at a time. Traces of the placement of the guillotine can be seen on the floor by the drain.

Budzislawski was executed on September 7, 1943, during the Bloody Nights of Plötzensee. These mass executions were personally ordered by Hitler following a British air raid on Berlin on September 3, 1943, which damaged Plötzensee Prison and its execution facilities.

With over 300 prisoners awaiting execution, Nazi officials ordered that clemency appeals be expedited, and in nearly all cases, execution was approved. Due to the damage, executions could only be carried out by hanging, and prisoners were executed eight at a time. On the night of September 7 alone, 186 prisoners were hanged, and executions continued until September 12, 1943, resulting in over 250 deaths.

Official documents from the time, shows that Budzislawski was executed alongside Felix Israel Heymann and Martin Israel Kochmann, both members of the Herbert Baum Group. The official Nazi execution report lists him among the victims.

== Legacy and commemoration ==
On June 3, 2004, a stolperstein (stumbling stone) was placed in his memory at Große Hamburger Straße 15/16, Berlin, his last known residence.

- He is listed among the many resistance fighters executed at Plötzensee.
- His story is recognized as part of the persecution of Jewish and LGBTQ+ resistance members under the Nazi regime.
