= Herbert Michaelis =

German lawyer and Communist

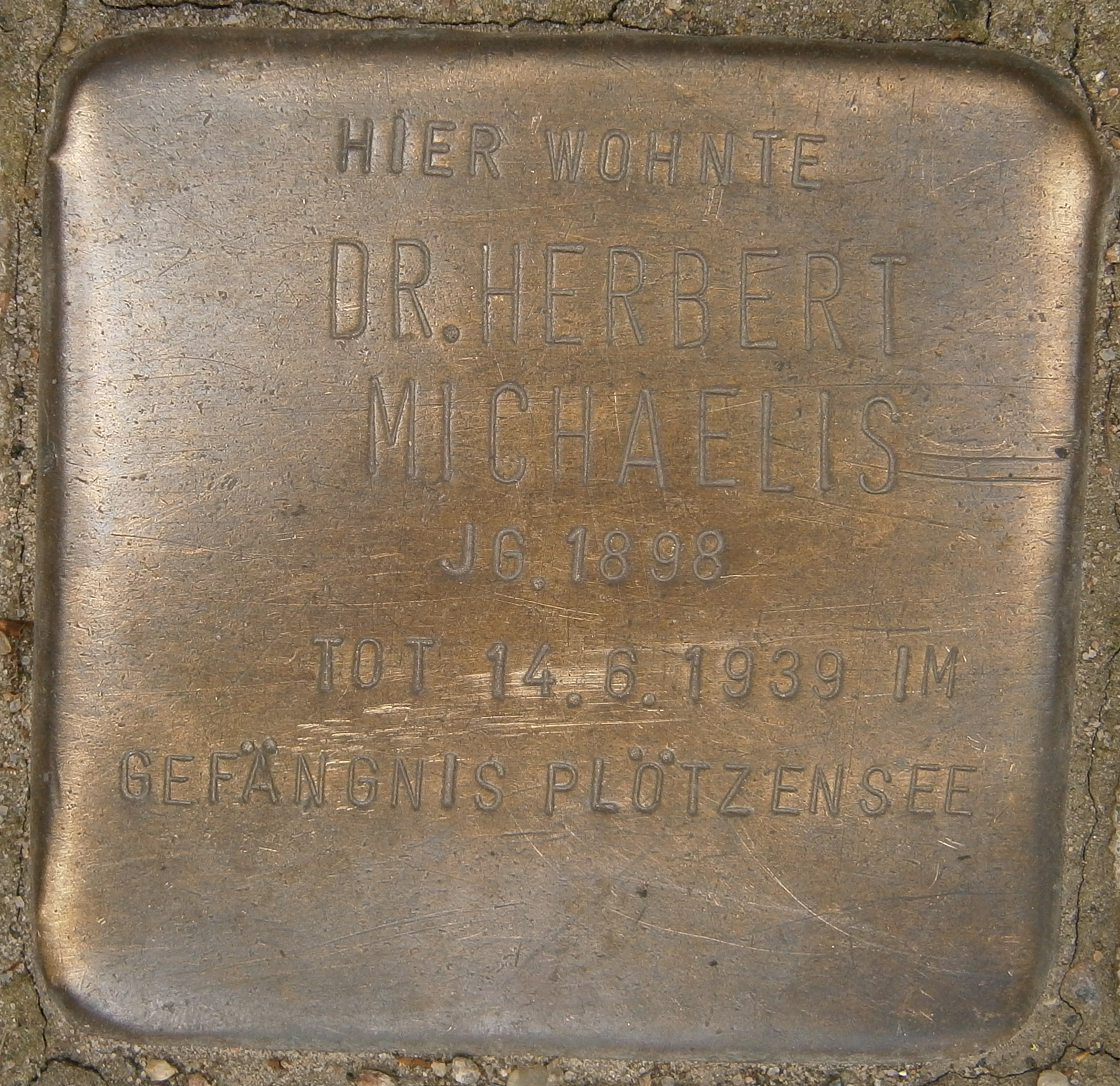
- Stolperstein for Michaelis
- Born: 3 September 1898; Hamburg, German Empire
- Died: 14 June 1939 (aged 40); Plötzensee Prison, Berlin, Nazi Germany
- Cause of death: Execution by guillotine
- Occupations: Lawyer and Communist

Herbert Michaelis (3 September 1898 — 14 June 1939) was a German lawyer and Communist, and a member of the German Resistance during the Third Reich.

== Biography ==
Michaelis was born in Hamburg, the son of a Jewish businessman. He served from 1916 to 1918, during the First World War. He started his law practice in Hamburg in 1928, and that same year, he married Marie-Luise Rom, with whom he had three children. He joined the Communist Party of Germany (KPD) in 1924. In 1933, the year the Nazis seized power, someone anonymously denounced him to the Gestapo. The Nazis began to restrict what Jews could do, and Michaelis was prohibited from practicing his profession, as a result. Shortly after that, he was fraudulently accused of an offense, and was sentenced to two years in a Zuchthaus.

At Lübeck Zuchthaus, he got to know the lathe operator, Bruno Rieboldt, and metalworker, Dagobert Biermann (father of former East German dissident, Wolf Biermann). After their release, Rieboldt and Biermann went to work at the Hamburg wharves for Blohm + Voss. Rieboldt informed Michaelis about armaments work at Blohm + Voss, particularly regarding the construction of airplane motors and warships.

The goal of the Resistance group around Michaelis was to expose to the world the Nazi's secret involvement in the Spanish Civil War. Biermann and his brother-in-law, Karl Dietrich, a ship captain, reported to Michaelis on the weapons shipments from January to March 1937 to Francisco Franco. Michaelis relayed this information in January and February 1937 through a middle man, Richard Bähre, who, in turn, forwarded it to the exiled KPD leadership in Basel.

On March 26, 1937, Rieboldt was arrested. Two days later, Michaelis and Biermann were arrested. Michaelis was convicted by the second Senate of the Volksgerichtshof in Hamburg and sentenced to death. He was executed on 14 June 1939 at Plötzensee Prison in Berlin. Reiboldt received a 12-year sentence, and Biermann was sentenced to six years at hard labor in a Zuchthaus. Only Dietrich was allowed to go free.

== Memorials ==
Michaelis is included in the names on the monument unveiled in 2007, honoring the lawyers who perished at the hands of the Nazis. The monument stands in front of the House of German Lawyers' Association in Berlin. There is a stolperstein for him at Isestraße 23, in Hamburg.
