= Joachim Sadrozinski =

German Army officer and member of the 20 July Plot (1907–1944)

- Born: 20 September 1907; Tilsit, East Prussia, German Empire
- Died: 29 September 1944 (aged 37); Plötzensee Prison, Berlin, Nazi Germany
- Cause of death: Execution by hanging
- Military career
- Allegiance: Weimar Republic (to 1933); Nazi Germany
- Branch: Army
- Service years: 1926–1944
- Rank: Lieutenant colonel
- Conflicts: World War II

Joachim Sadrozinski (9 September 1907 – 29 September 1944) was a German Army officer who took part in the 20 July plot.

Sadrozinski was born in Tilsit, East Prussia (today Sovetsk, Kaliningrad, Russia), and joined the Reichswehr as an officer cadet in April 1926. He passed the Prussian Military Academy in Berlin in April 1939 and later fought in the Second World War. He was promoted to lieutenant colonel, joined the general staff, and in June 1944 was wounded. He became a group leader on the staff of General Friedrich Fromm, Commander in Chief of the Replacement Army (Ersatzheer), and served as deputy to Claus Schenk Graf von Stauffenberg.

On 20 July 1944 Sadrozinski was responsible for the duplication and transmission of the "Valkyrie" orders in the Bendlerblock in Berlin. He was arrested by the Gestapo immediately after the attack on Hitler on 20 July 1944 and on 21 August 1944 was sentenced to death by the Volksgerichtshof. On 29 September 1944 Sadrozinski was hanged at Plötzensee Prison, with Joachim Meichssner, Fritz von der Lancken, Wilhelm-Friedrich zu Lynar and Otto Herfurth.

Sadrozinski was married to Elfriede Hempel, and they had one daughter and four sons.

== See also ==
- German resistance to Nazism
