= Otto Herfurth =

German Generalmajor and July 20 plot member (1893–1944)

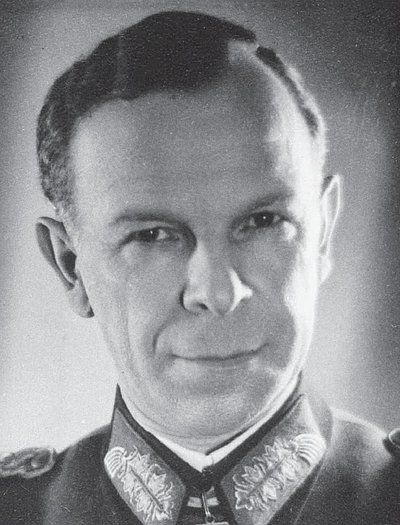
- Born: 22 January 1893; Hasserode, Province of Saxony, Prussia, German Empire
- Died: 29 September 1944 (aged 51); Plötzensee Prison, Berlin, Nazi Germany
- Cause of death: Execution by hanging
- Military career
- Allegiance: German Empire; Weimar Republic; Nazi Germany
- Branch: German Army
- Service years: 1915–1944
- Rank: Generalmajor
- Unit: III Military District
- Conflicts: World War I; World War II; Battle of France; Operation Barbarossa; Battle of Kiev (1941); First Battle of Kharkov; Battle of Rostov (1942); Battle of the Caucasus
- Awards: Knight's Cross of the Iron Cross

Otto Herfurth (22 January 1893 – 29 September 1944) was a general in the Wehrmacht of Nazi Germany during World War II. He was a recipient of the Knight's Cross of the Iron Cross. Herfurth was executed as a conspirator in the 20 July Plot.

Herfurth was born in Hasserode in 1893. He joined the Imperial German Army in 1915, fought in World War I as a Leutnant and served as a battalion adjutant. At the end of the war, he remained in the Reichswehr as a career officer. He was an adjutant in the Reich War Ministry from 1935 to 1938. During World War II, he was a department head in OKH, a regimental commander and the chief of staff to Military Districts V (Stuttgart) and III (Berlin), successively.

Herfurth initially supported the coup attempt against Adolf Hitler, but later during the evening changed sides. Nevertheless, on 14 August 1944, he was arrested and was tried by the People's Court. He was hanged on 29 September 1944 along with Joachim Meichssner, Fritz von der Lancken, Wilhelm-Friedrich zu Lynar and Joachim Sadrozinski at Plötzensee Prison in Berlin.

== Awards and decorations ==
- Iron Cross (1914)
  - 2nd Class
  - 1st Class
- Hanseatic Cross of Hamburg
- Military Merit Cross, 3rd class with War Decoration (Austria-Hungary)
- Wound Badge in Black (1914)
- Honour Cross of the World War 1914/1918
- Iron Cross (1939)
  - 2nd Class
  - 1st Class
- Knight's Cross of the Iron Cross on 14 September 1942 as Oberst and commander of Infanterie-Regiment 117

== See also ==
- List of members of the 20 July plot

== Notes ==
=== References ===
- Fellgiebel, Walther-Peer (2000) [First published 1986]. Die Träger des Ritterkreuzes des Eisernen Kreuzes 1939–1945 – Die Inhaber der höchsten Auszeichnung des Zweiten Weltkrieges aller Wehrmachtteile [The Bearers of the Knight's Cross of the Iron Cross 1939–1945 – The Owners of the Highest Award of the Second World War of all Wehrmacht Branches] (in German). Friedberg, Germany: Podzun-Pallas. ISBN 978-3-7909-0284-6.
- Webb, James Jack (2024). Generals and Admirals of the Third Reich: For Country or Fuehrer. Vol. 2: H–O. Havertown, PA: Casemate Publishers. ISBN 978-1-952-71517-4.
