= C. Paul Herfurth =

Clarence Paul Herfurth was the first author of the Tune a Day books, which are used across the English speaking world to teach music. According to A Tune a Day: Trombone or Euphonium (1944), Herfurth was born in 1893, and "began violin lessons at the age of seven and studied in Germany for a year before entering the New England Conservatory of Music in 1911. Graduating in 1916, his first school position was at Asheville, North Carolina. In 1922 he moved to New Jersey and organised that state's first full instrumental music program. Although best known for his Tune a Day books, Herfurth also edited and arranged many collections for violin, cello and viola with piano. He now lives in retirement in Florida." This source explains that Herfurth later enlisted the services of Hugh M. Stuart and other writers to expand the coverage of the books.

According to his Library of Congress name authority record Herfurth, C. Paul (Clarence Paul) died in 1988, and the record adds the information from the Social Security Death Index "(C.P. Herfurth; b. Oct. 7, 1893, d. Aug. 16, 1988)".

== Tune a Day books ==
The earliest, dated, Tune a Day book listed in the Library of Congress catalog is simply entitled Tune a Day and was published in Boston by the Boston Music company in 1937. Others quickly followed: Tune a Day for Cornet (Trumpet) Instruction (1941), titles for clarinet, string bass, trombone (baritone) and saxophone in 1942, 43, 44 and 45 respectively. The series soon expanded to include fifteen different versions, with books in each version catering for various levels. The books remained unchanged for many years until a recent republication with updated photographs; the much-loved original editions had a deceptively simple format, with a carefully structured musical development, featuring photographs of teenagers from the nineteen forties playing the instruments. It was only in 2006 that the Boston Music Company updated the series to create the New Tune a Day series, with color photographs and modernised typography. Despite the modernisation, the old series remains popular, and the company has recently reissued the old series in parallel with the new.

The series did not include any books for piano, perhaps because the beginners books of John W. Schaum filled this niche: both series contained simple well known hymn and folk tunes.

== Bibliography ==
- The Quaintness of Tune a Day
