= Gertrud Seele =

German nurse (1917–1945)

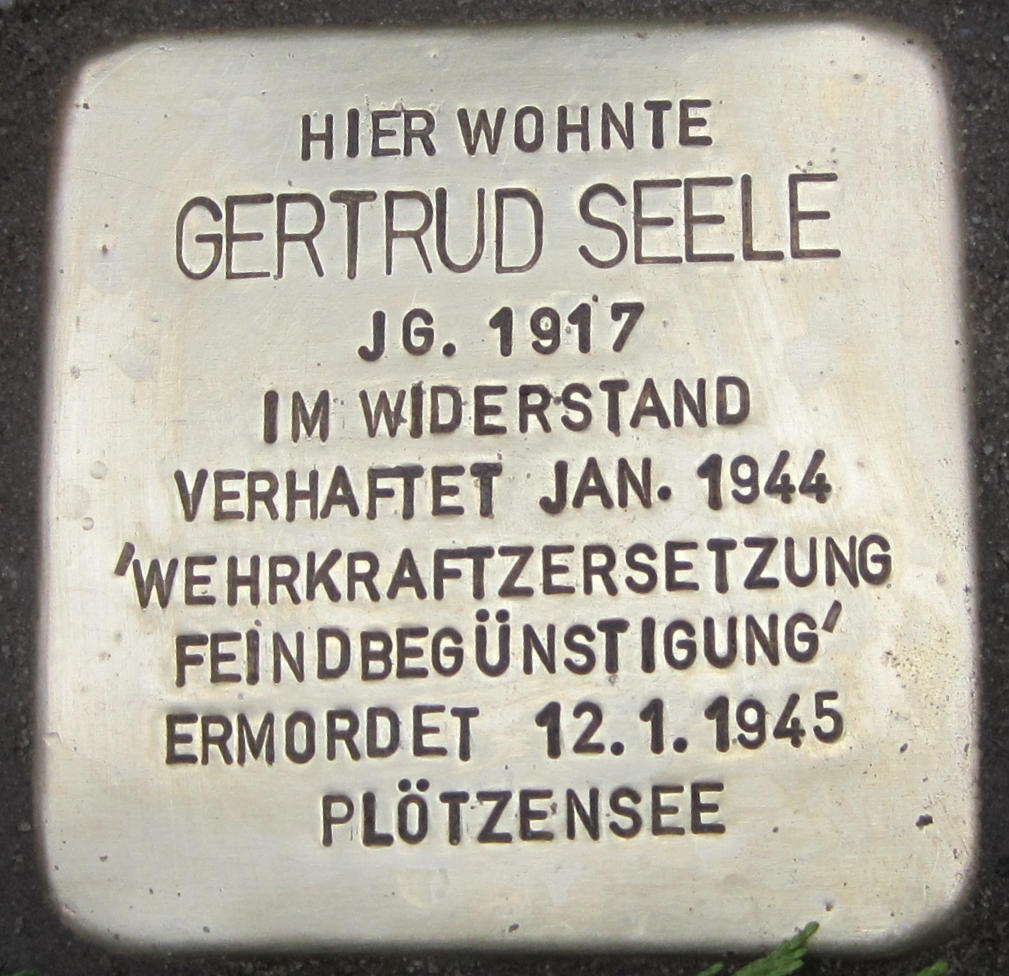
Gertrud Seele

Gertrud Seele (22 September 1917 – 12 January 1945) was a German nurse and social worker executed by the Nazis for helping Jews.

Outraged by persecution of the Jews in Germany, Seele took Jewish people into hiding in her home and arranged safe houses for those who were escaping the Nazis. She was arrested in 1944, having been denounced to the Gestapo, and was then charged with aiding the enemy and undermining military morale. Her request to see her daughter before her execution was denied. She was executed by guillotine.
