= Anna Maximovitch =

Russian Red Orchestra informer

Anna Pavlovna Maximovitch (8 May 1901, Chernigov – c. 20 July 1943, Plötzensee Prison, Berlin) was a Russian aristocrat and neuropsychiatrist, (Note: Known as a nerve doctor in the 1930s–1940s.) who became an informer and important member of the Red Orchestra organisation in France during World War II.

Maximovitch was the daughter of a cavalry officer Baron Maximovitch, who held the rank of general, on the staff of Imperial Russian Army. She was a Czarist. Maximovitch's cover name in radio communication was Arztin.

== Life ==
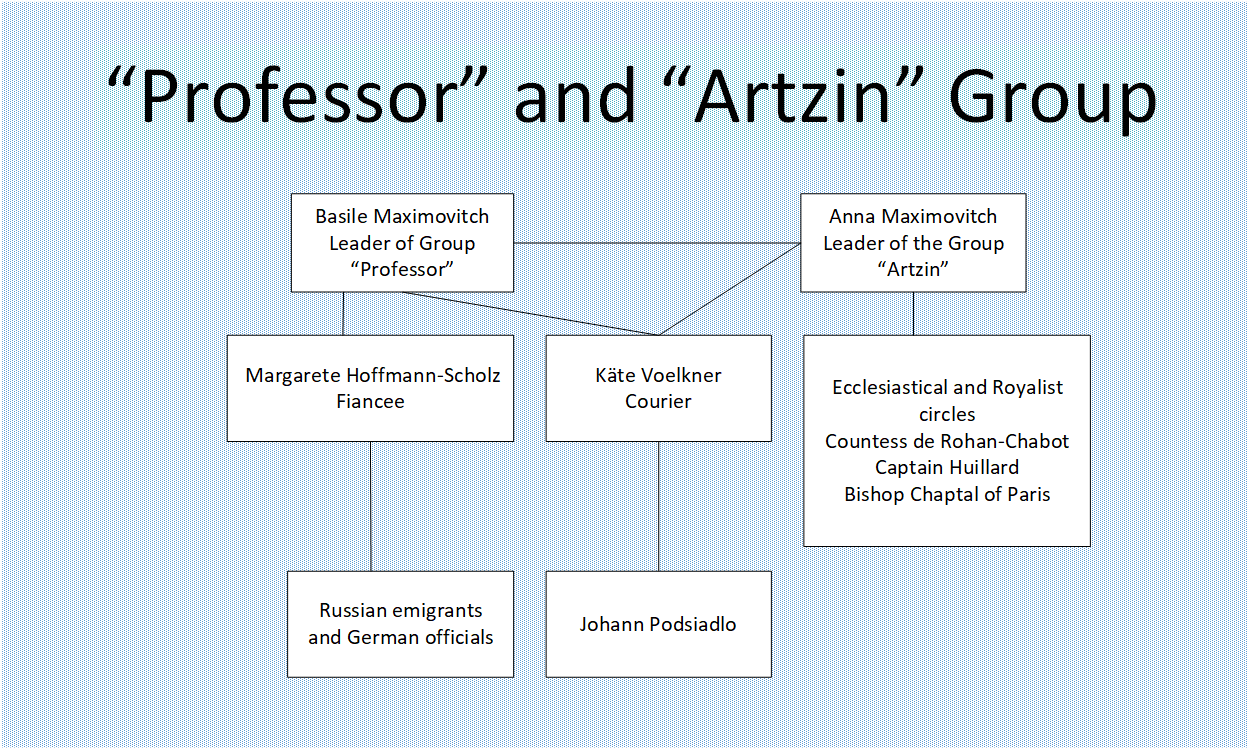
Organisation diagram of the "Professor" as the 3rd group in Leopold Trepper organisation of seven groups. Professor was the alias of Johann Wenzel. The "Arztin" group was the 4th group in the Trepper organisation and was run by Maximovitch who collected intelligence from French clerical and royalist circles. The "Professor" group, a network run by brother Basile Maximovitch collected intelligence from German Wehrmacht and White Russian emigre groups

Maximovitch was a Russian émigré, who left Russia with her brother Basile Maximovitch and her mother Edda in 1922, to escape the Russian Revolution and arrived via Constantinople to settle in an apartment at 12 Rue de Viatau in Paris, France. When their father died, he left the family peniless. They turned to the church and received help from Emanuel-Anatole-Raphaël Chaptal de Chanteloup, who ensured they were fed and the children were educated.

In Paris, Maximovitch joined the French Army and trained as a nurse before taking part in the Great Syrian Revolt, in a campaign against the Druze during 1925–1926. While there she treated Count Léonor de Rohan-Chabot. After leaving the army she continued her studies and became a neurologist, at the time known as a nerve doctor. During the 1930s, Maximovitch worked in a nursing home in Thiais.

Around 1936, Maximovitch became a member of the left-wing Union of Russian Defencists, eventually becoming their leader. The union was an organisation that existed in Paris and Prague to decide whom they should support in the event of war between Russia and Germany. Maximovitch supported the group between 1937 and 1939, by supplying monies to individual members of the organisation. Eventually, the organisation decided to support the Soviet Union. In September 1939, during mobilisation of the French Army, Maximovitch was imprisoned and then quickly released.

Through her brother, she was introduced to Leopold Trepper in November 1940, who at the time was the technical director of a Soviet espionage network in Europe. In 1940, Maximovitch recruited Käte Voelkner, a secretary who became part of Trepper's group in France. Voelkner worked in the German headquarters with offices in the Chamber of Deputies in Paris. She would supply blank forms, stamps and specimen signatures of heads of department for copying.

The money provided by Trepper enabled Maximovitch to open a sanatorium in Choisy-le-Roi in Paris in the late 1930s. It was a moneyed, well-to-do area of Paris which enabled her to pick up gossip from her patients, some of whom were high-ranking French nobility and administrative people, Alain Louis Auguste Marie de Rohan-Chabot, who was a French officer and resistance fighter and his wife Helene Claire Marie de Liencourt, Countess de Rohan-Chabot. Countess de Rohan-Chabot, rented out her empty 18th-century Château Billeron, located in Lugny-Champagne to Maximovitch as a business location to host a health clinic, that could also provide cover for the group and as a safehouse. It also hosted a radio transmitter.

Maximovitch ran the 4th espionage network of Trepper's 7 networks in France. She was able to provide intelligence from French clerical and royalists groups. Maximovitch also had a special arrangement with Bishop Emanuel-Anatole-Raphaël Chaptal de Chanteloup of Paris that gave her access to the Vatican.

== Arrest ==
Maximovitch was arrested with her brother on 12 December 1942 at 14 rue Émile Zola in Choisy-le-Roi by French police and taken to be interrogated at Rue des Saussaies by members of the Sonderkommando Rote Kapelle, a special Gestapo and Abwehr commission established to track down members of the Red Orchestra in France, Belgium and Low Countries. Maximovitch and here brother were betrayed by Leopold Trepper on the 5 December 1942, after he was captured by the Sonderkommando.

After being interrogated, she was sent to Fresnes Prison. A trial was held on 8 March 1943 at 62–64 Rue du Faubourg-Saint-Honoré by Luftwaffe Judge Manfred Roeder, where she was sentenced to death by decapitation. Along with her brother, she was taken to Plötzensee Prison, where she was executed around 20 July 1943.
