= Emmy Zehden =

German Jehovah's Witness executed by the Nazis (1900–1944)

- Born: Emmy Windhorst; March 28, 1900; Lübbecke, Germany
- Died: June 9, 1944 (aged 44); Plötzensee Prison, Berlin
- Occupations: Domestic service; newspaper delivery
- Spouse: Richard Zehden

Emmy Zehden, born Emmy Windhorst (March 28, 1900 – June 9, 1944) was a German Jehovah's Witness executed by the Nazis.

== Personal life ==
Zehden worked in domestic service and in 1918 moved to Berlin where she met Richard Zehden, a Jewish businessman; they married in the mid-1920s.

== Religion, resistance and death ==
In 1930, Zehden heard of the Bible Student movement. She and her husband were privately baptized as Jehovah's Witnesses in 1935 after the denomination was banned. In 1938, her husband was imprisoned for a year for his membership of the same faith. The couple had a foster-son, Horst Schmidt, who refused to do military service because of his Jehovah's Witness beliefs. Zehden hid Horst and two of his companions who were also refusing to do military service, but they were discovered and all four were sentenced to death. Horst's two companions were beheaded. Zehden was sentenced to death for undermining of military strength in connection with treasonous favoritism of the enemy, and although Zehden appealed for clemency she was also beheaded, on 9 June 1944 in Plötzensee Prison in Berlin. Horst was not executed, and married a Jehovah's Witness who had survived a concentration camp.

Her husband Richard was sent to Auschwitz concentration camp and died on November 5, 1943.

== Legacy ==
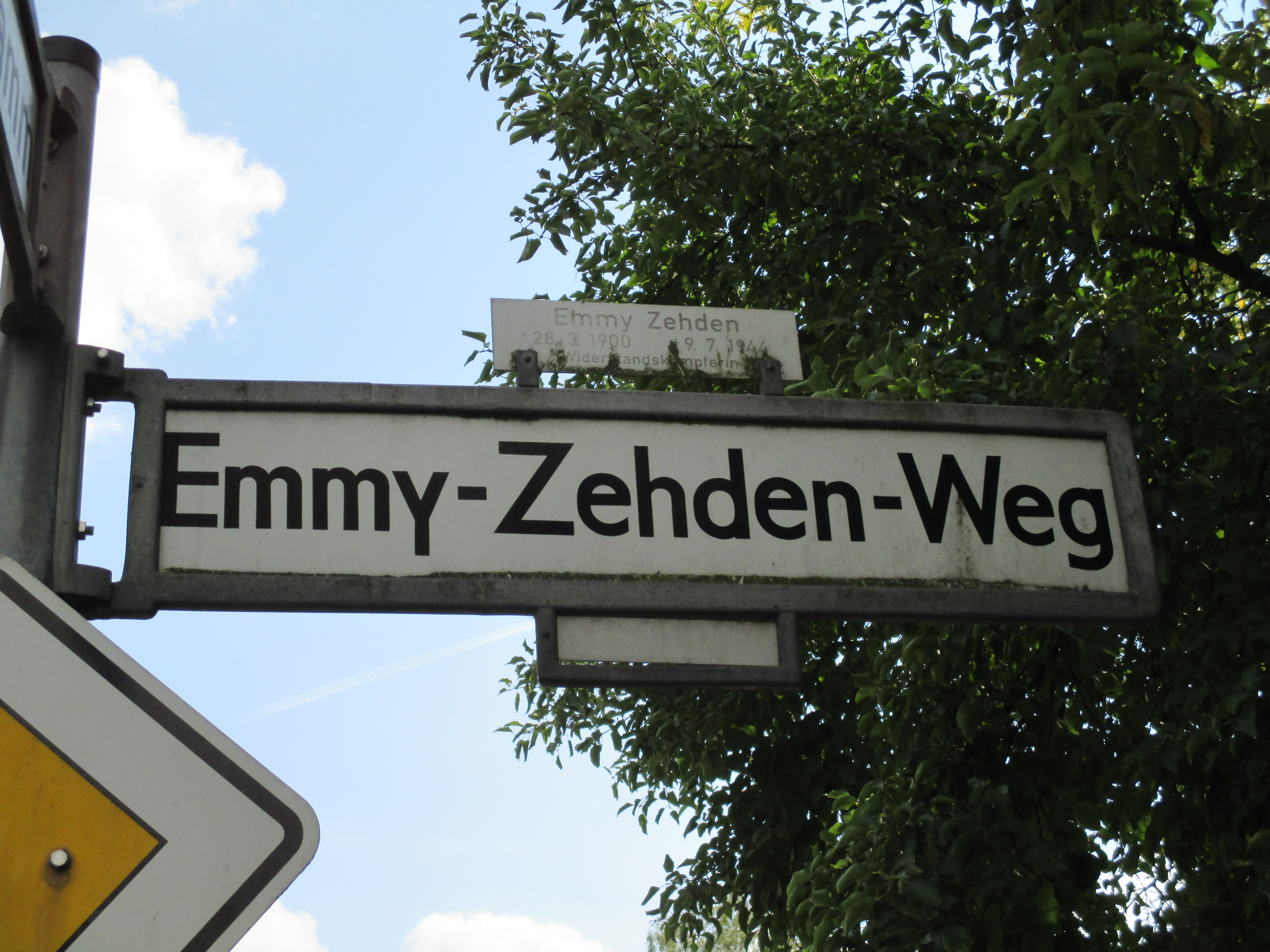
The street in Berlin named in Zehden's memory

Stolperstein at 32 Franzstrasse, Wilhelmstadt, Berlin

A street in Berlin was named Emmy-Zehden-Weg in Zehden's memory in 1992. A Stolperstein commemorates her outside 32 Franzstraße, Wilhelmstadt.

Her foster-son Horst Schmidt wrote Death always came on Mondays : persecuted for refusing to serve in the Nazi army : an autobiography and described as giving "insight into Horst's forster-mother Emmy Zehden's remarkable life".
