= Basile Maximovitch =

Russian Red Orchestra informer

Basile Maximovitch (2 July 1902, Chernigov - c. 6 July 1943, Plötzensee Prison, Berlin) was a Russian aristocrat and civil mining engineer. He became a Soviet agent by choice and subsequently became an important member of the Red Orchestra organisation in France during World War II. Maximovitch was the son of a Cavalry officer Baron Maximovitch, who held the rank of General, on the staff of Imperial Russian Army.

== Life ==
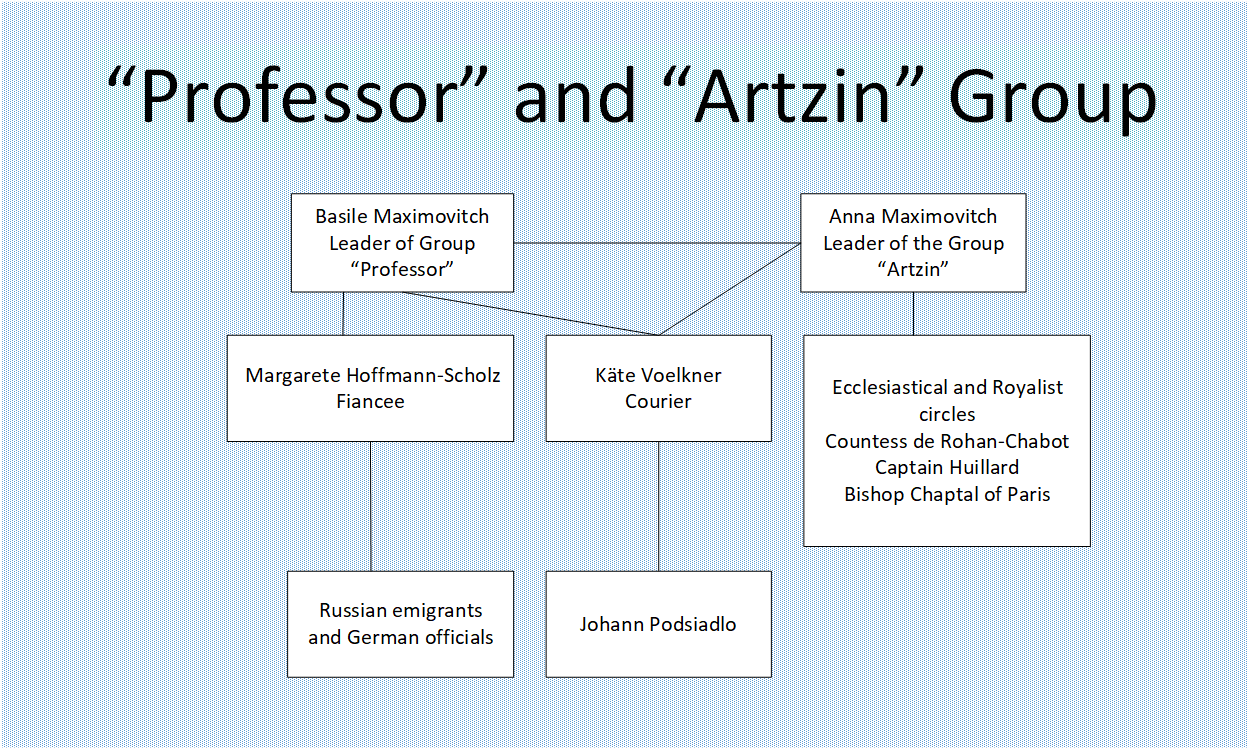
Organisation diagram of the "Professor" as the 3rd group in Leopold Trepper organisation of seven groups. Professor was the alias of Johann Wenzel. The "Artzin" group was the 4th group in the Trepper organisation and was run by Anna Maximovitch who collected intelligence from French clerical and royalist circles. The "Professor" group, run by Maximovitch that collected intelligence from German Wehrmacht and White Russian emigrant sources

Maximovitch was a Russian émigré who left Russia with his sister Anna Maximovitch in 1922 to escape the Russian Revolution. The couple along with their mother arrived via Constantinople to settle in Paris, France. (Note: Perrault refers to Basile Maximovitch as Vasili Maximovitch. Basil or Basile, the greek name corresponds to the Russian name of Vasili.) In Paris, the couple received help from Auxiliary bishop Emanuel-Anatole-Raphaël Chaptal de Chanteloup, who helped Maximovitch to train as civil engineer and enter the Lycée Saint-Louis-de-Gonzague as a teacher. Through Chaptal, Maximovitch developed extensive connections with white émigré communities in Paris and abroad.

On 31 May 1940, he was interned as a foreign suspect at Camp Vernet. Maximovitch became an interpreter for the German officer in charge, Wehrmacht colonel Hans Kuprian, who was on a committee that processed prisoners from the Vichy government for slave labour, after the French armistice. He released Maximovitch in August 1940. In prison, Maximovitch met Belarusian Samuel Erlik, who had links to Soviet Intelligence. Erlik was encouraged to recruit Maximovitch by the Soviet embassy. Maximovitch became an informer out of a belief in Russian Nationalism and had no love for the Soviet Regime or communism.

Maximovitch had an affair with Margarete Hoffman-Scholz, secretary to Kuprian, and a niece to General Carl-Heinrich von Stülpnagel, the military commander of Paris. At the time, von Stülpnagel was Commander of Greater Paris and this gave Maximovitch access to intelligence that came from the German High Command. With Maximovitch's help Hoffman-Scholz was steered through a number of different jobs in German agencies that enabled Maximovitch to access different types of intelligence.

In November 1940, Maximovitch was introduced to Leopold Trepper, by a member of the French Communist Party. At the time, Trepper was the technical director of a Soviet Red Army Intelligence unit in western Europe. Both Basil and Anna became very important to Trepper. Maximovitch ran the 3rd network of Trepper's 7 networks in Europe, supplying intelligence garnered from White Russians emigrant groups as well as from groups in the German Wehrmacht.

== Arrest ==
Maximovitch was arrested with his sister on 12 December 1942 at 14 rue Émile Zola in Choisy-le-Roi. He was taken by French police to be interrogated at Rue des Saussaies by members of the Sonderkommando Rote Kapelle, a special Gestapo and Abwehr commission establish to track down members of the Red Orchestra in France, Belgium and Low Countries. When the interrogation was complete, then were sent to Fresnes Prison. Maximovitch and his sister were betrayed by Leopold Trepper on the 5 December 1942, after he was captured by the Sonderkommando.

A trial was held on 8 March 1943 at 62-64 Rue du Faubourg-Saint-Honoré by Luftwaffe Judge Manfred Roeder where he was sentenced to death by decapitation. He and his sister were taken to Plötzensee Prison where they were executed in July 1943.

== Bibliography ==
- Langeois, Christian (2017). Les chants d'honneur : de la Chorale populaire à l'Orchestre rouge, Suzanne Cointe (1905-1943) (in French). Paris: Cherche midi. ISBN 9782749150697. OCLC 982018539.
