= Friedhof Heerstraße =

Cemetery in Berlin

Coordinates: 52.514°N 13.251°E

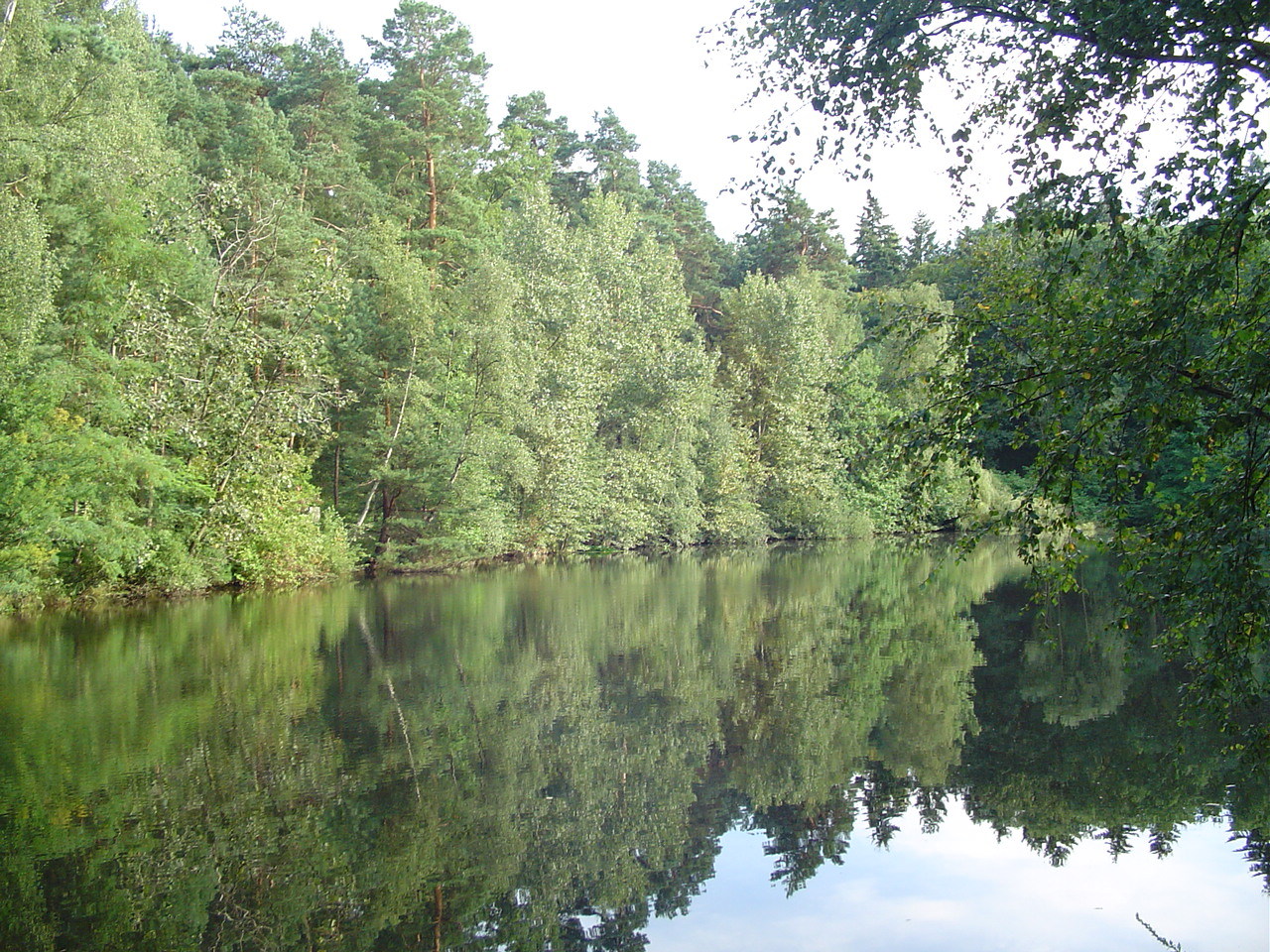
Sausuhlensee

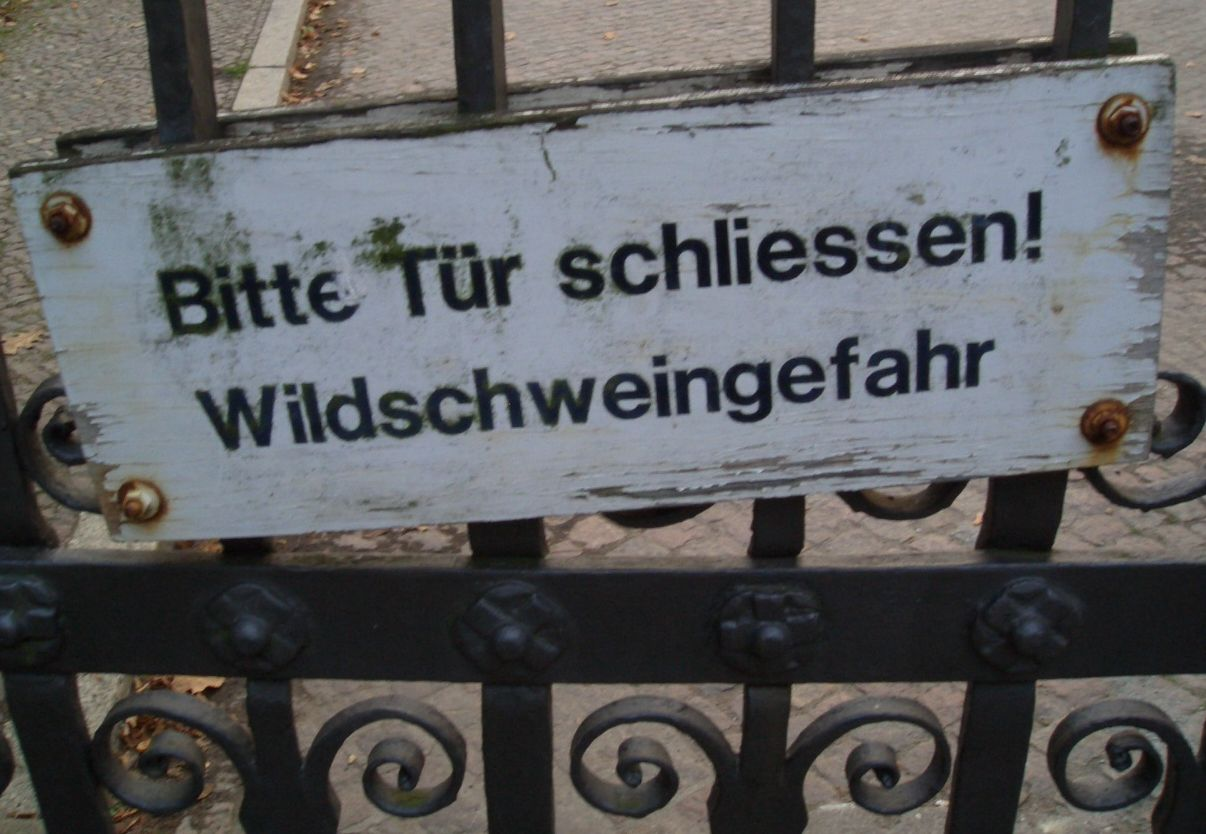
Please close the door because of the wild boars

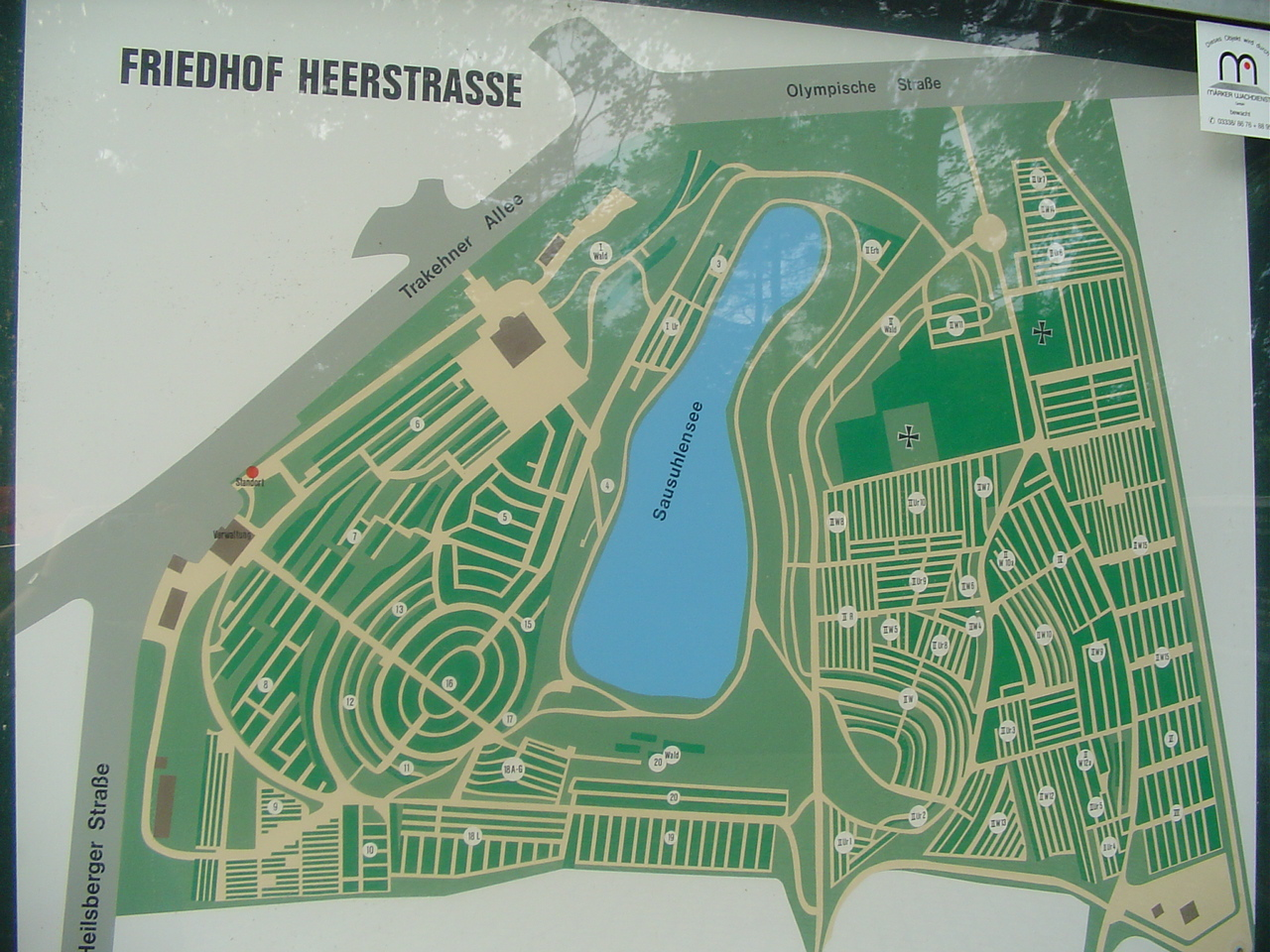
Map

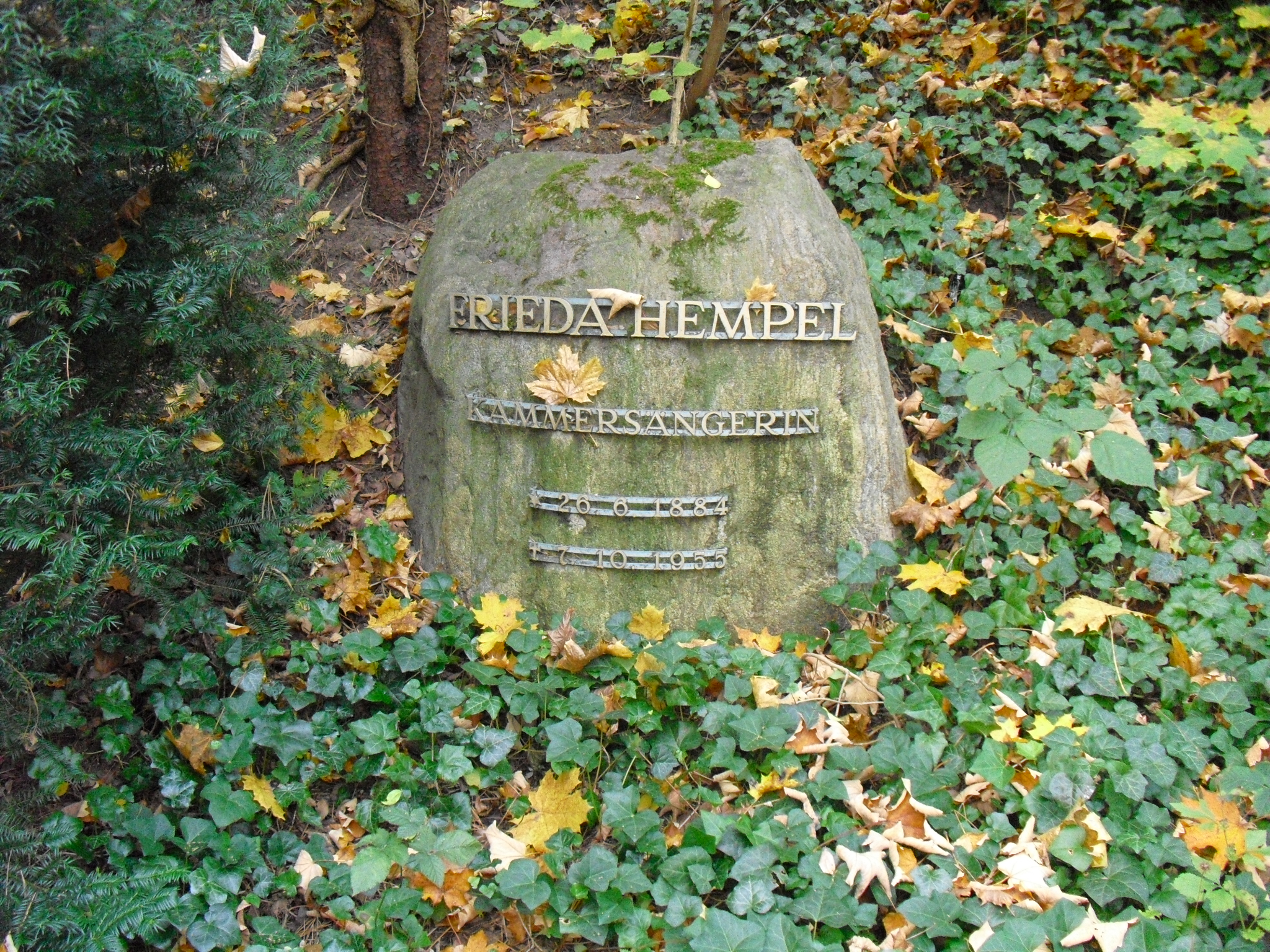
Frieda Hempel

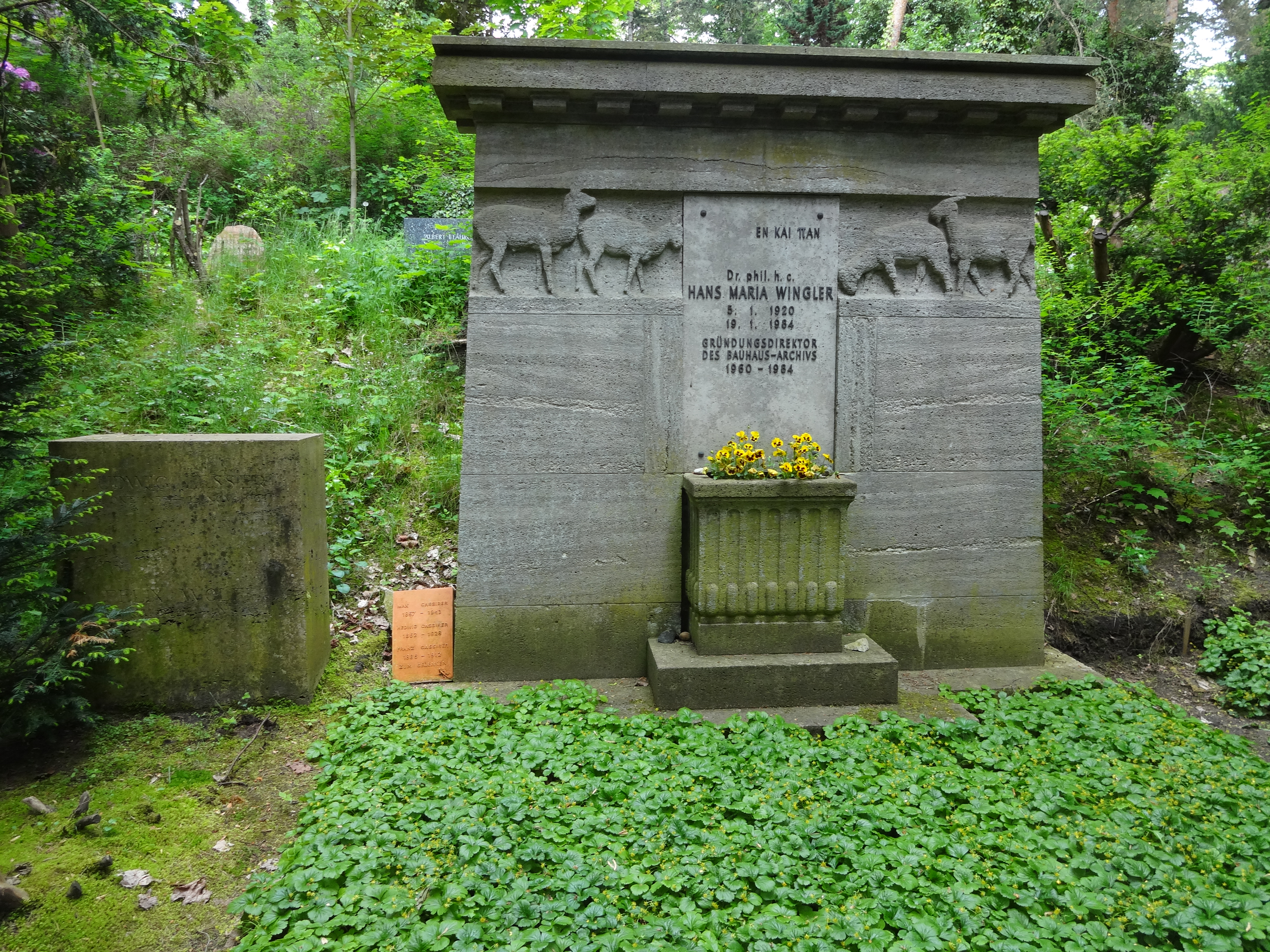
Max Cassirer, later Hans Maria Wingler, designed by August Gaul

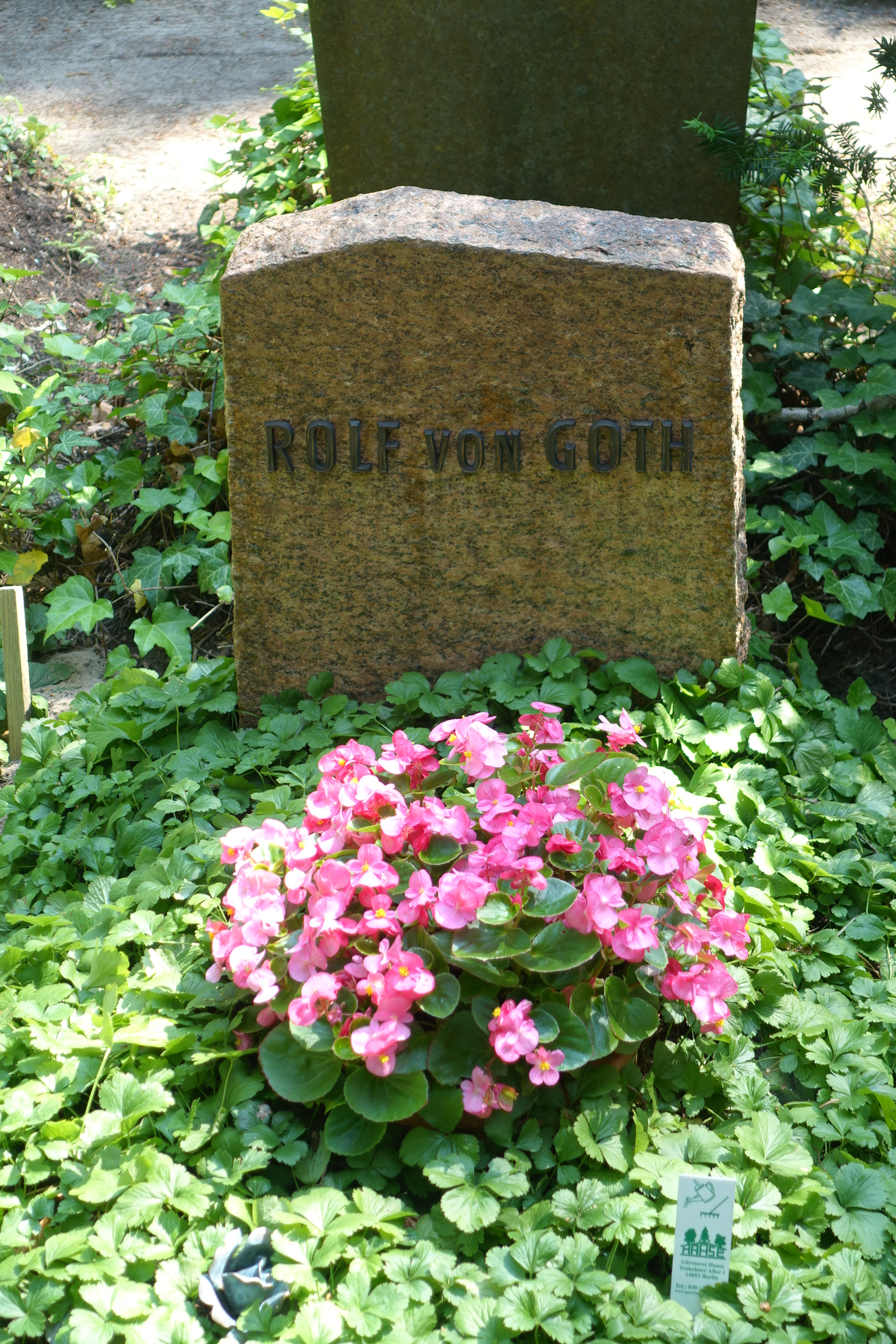
Rolf von Goth

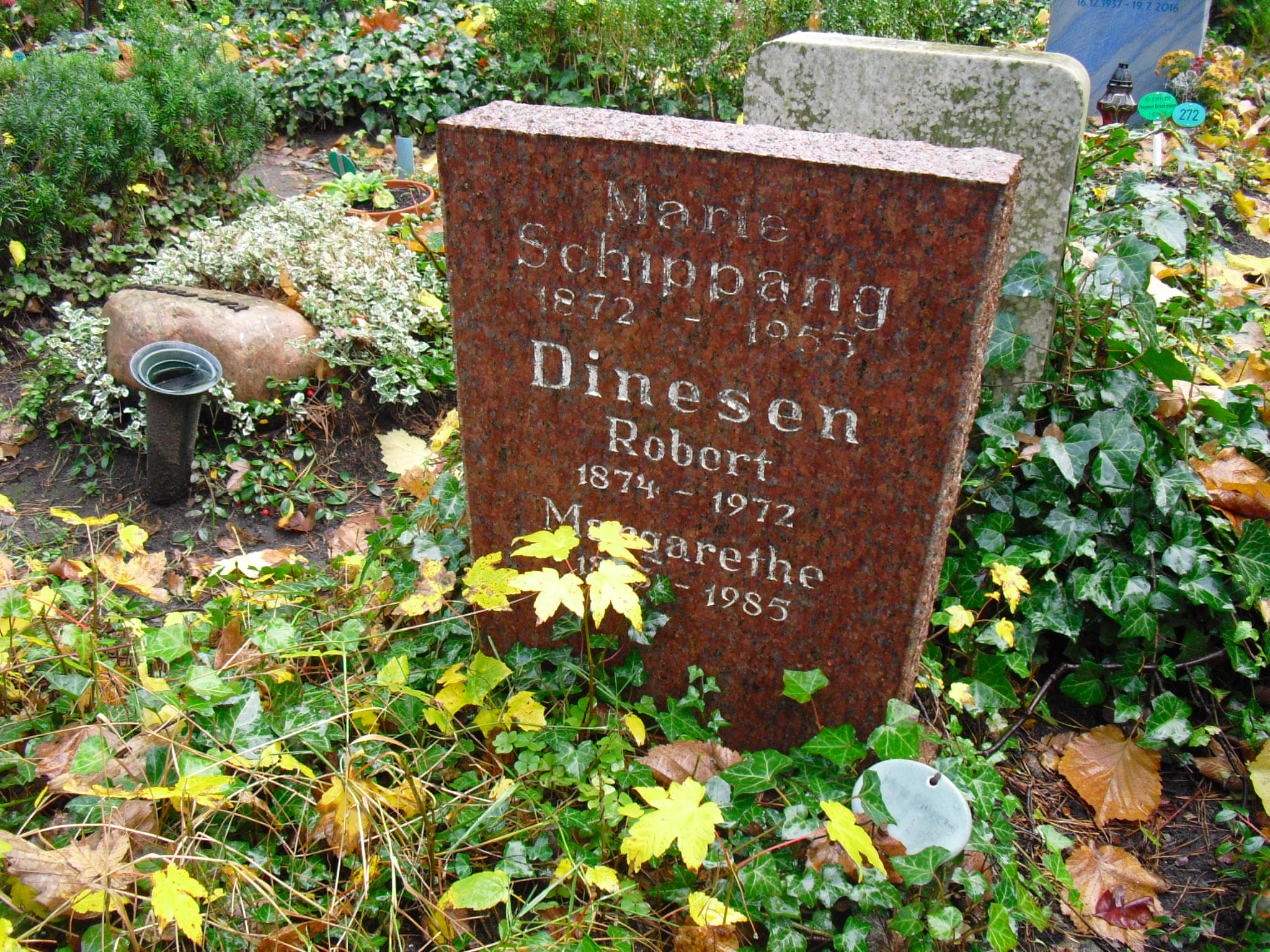
Robert Dinesen and Margarete Schön

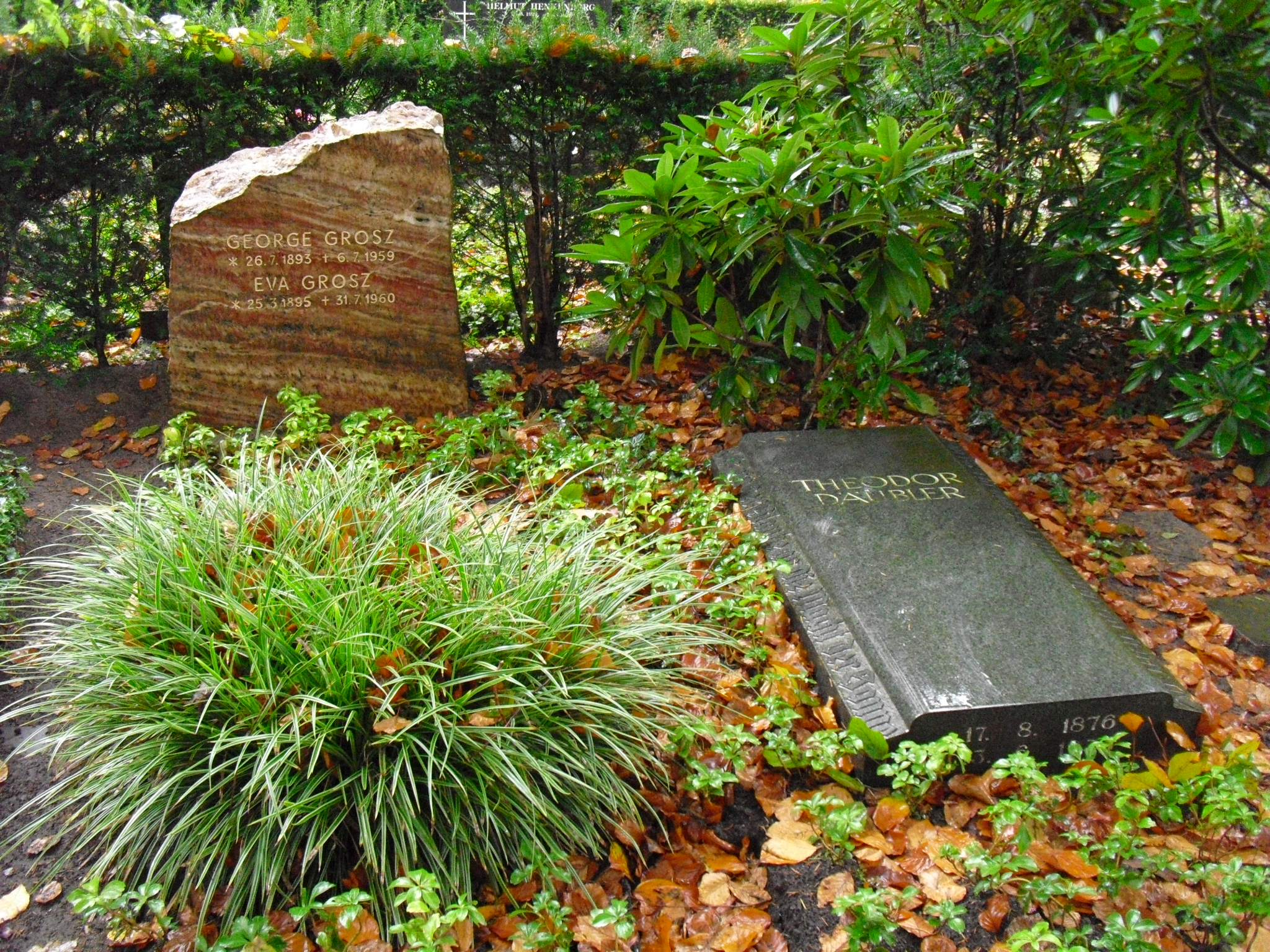
Neighbours: George Grosz (left), Theodor Däubler (right)

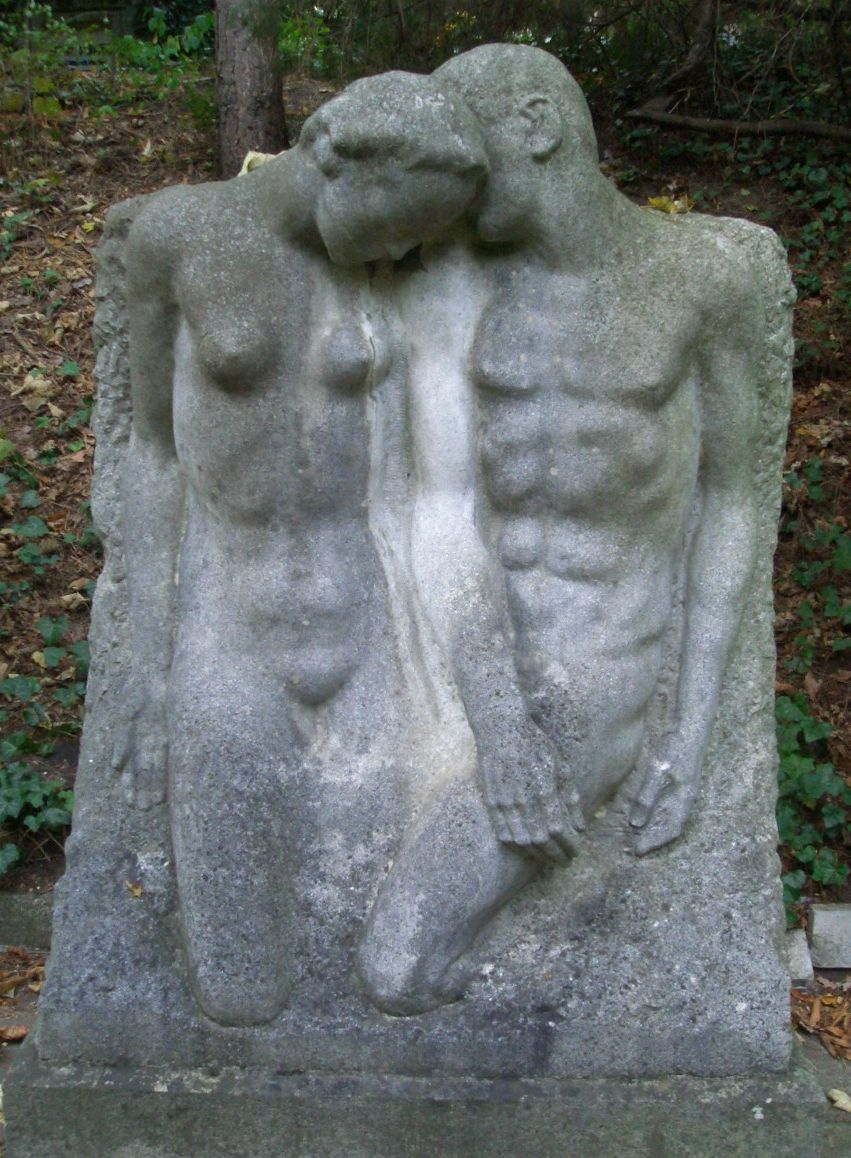
Work of later Nazi favorite Josef Thorak for the family of Jewish Franz Ullstein

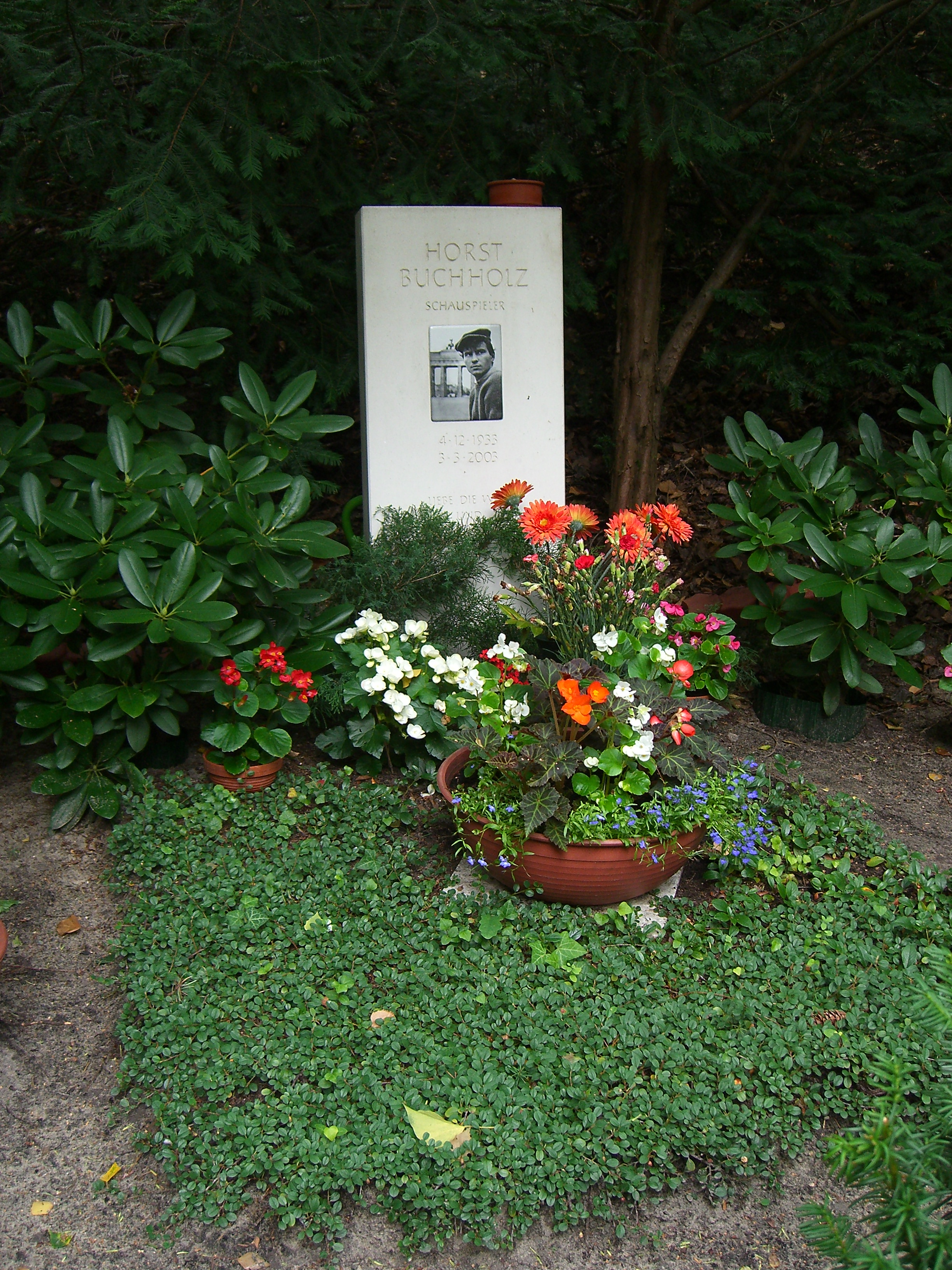
Horst Buchholz

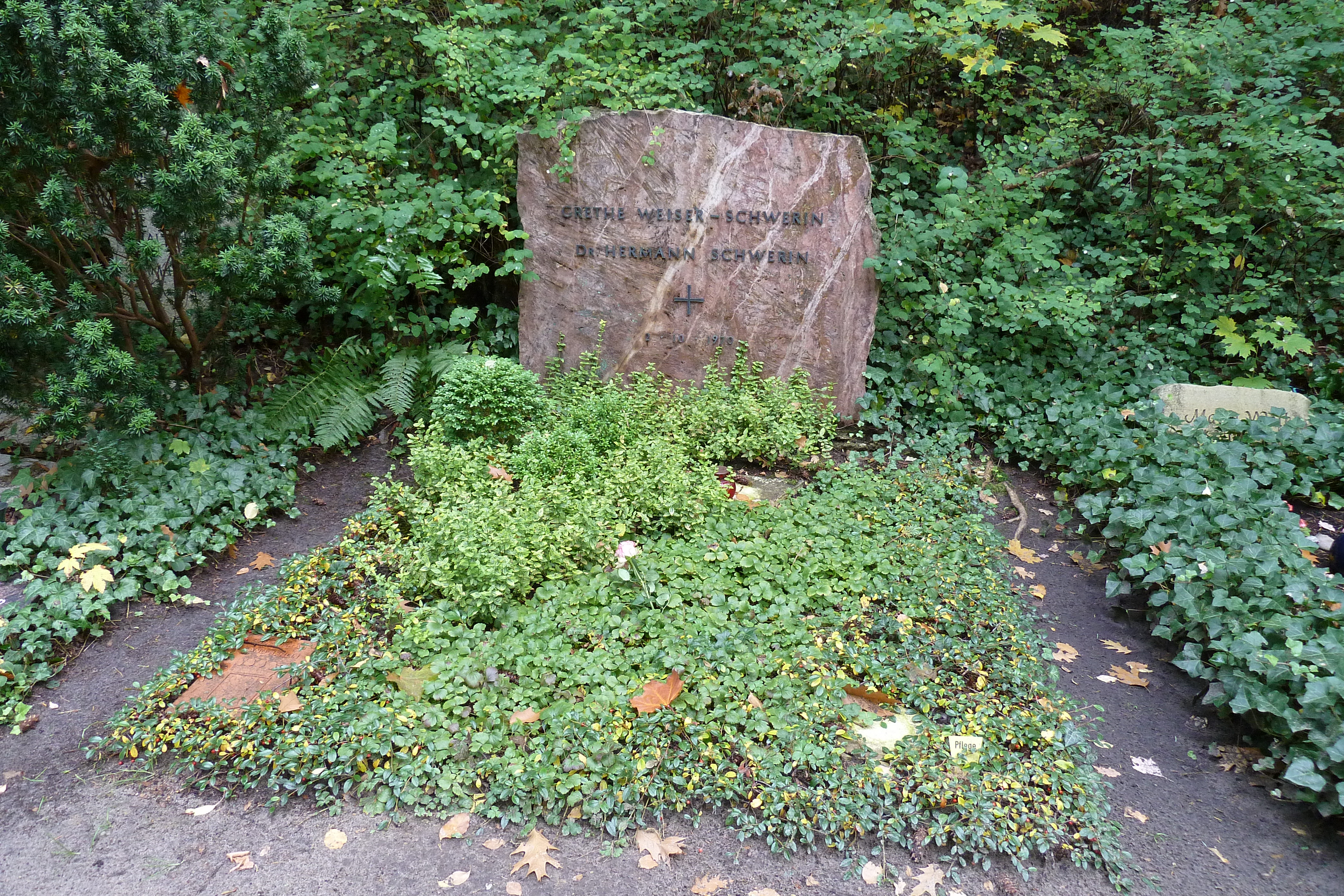
Grethe Weiser

The Friedhof Heerstraße cemetery is located at Trakehnerallee 1 (Trakehner avenue No.1), district of Charlottenburg-Wilmersdorf in Berlin, Germany, to the east of the Olympiastadion. It covers an area of 149,650 square meters.

The cemetery was originally named and planned for the local residents of Villenkolonie Heerstraße. It was laid out between 1921 and 1924 around the Sausuhlensee (Sow's wallow lake), so called after wallows the wild boars used there. Created by landscape architect Erwin Barth as a forest cemetery, the chapel was designed by Erich Blunck.

Today's cemetery does not reflect its original design. In 1935/36 the original plans for extending the cemetery were dropped and the land was appropriated for landscaping related to the 1936 Summer Olympics; the fact that the non-denominational cemetery contained a number of Jewish graves bolstered the Nazis' need to keep the cemetery out of sight. Another problem for the Olympic organizers was that the cemetery chapel could be seen from the sports fields; accordingly the roof was lowered and other changes made to its design. The extension was only delayed and realized immediately after the war in May 1945. In 1948 the war-damaged chapel was rebuilt following the 1936 design alterations.

From the beginning this cemetery was open to all: Christians, Jews, Muslims, and even suicides. Its idyllic location on the lake attracted many prominent people whose graves are located there.

== Graves of prominent people ==
Those graves marked by an asterisk (*) are Ehrengrab des Landes Berlin (Honoured Grave: the city of Berlin pays all fees)

- Alfred Abel (1879–1937), actor and director
- Conrad Ansorge (1862–1930), composer and pianist
- Jakob Arjouni, (1964–2013), writer
- Hermann Bamberg* (1846–1928), Berlin honorary citizen
- Marcus Behmer* (1879–1958), writer, book illustrator, graphic designer and painter
- Arnold Berliner* (1862–1942), physicist
- Leo Blech (1871–1958), composer and conductor
- Werner Bloch* (1890–1973), politician
- Michael Bohnen (1887–1965), opera singer and actor
- Karl Bonhoeffer* (1868–1948), neurologist, psychiatrist and physician
- Alfred Braun* (1888–1978), screenwriter, actor and film director
- Ferdinand Bruckner* (1891–1958), writer and theater manager
- Erich Buchholz* (1891–1972), painter
- Horst Buchholz (1933–2003), actor
- Bernhard-Viktor Christoph-Carl "Vicco" von Bülow (1923–2011), better known as Loriot, humorist, cartoonist, film director, actor and writer
- Paul Cassirer* (1871–1925), art dealer
- Theodor Däubler* (1876–1934), poet
- Alexander Dehms* (1904–1979), politician
- Frida Leider* (1888–1975), opera singer
- Robert Dinesen, (1874–1972), Danish actor and film director
- Günter von Drenkmann*, president of the Court of Appeal
- Bill Drews* (1870–1938), Prussian Minister of the Interior
- Tilla Durieux* (1880–1971), actress
- Fritz Dylong* (1894–1965), politician
- Edyth Edwards* (1899–1956), actress
- Leonore Ehn* (1888–1978), actress
- Alexander Engel (1902–1968), actor
- Erich Fiedler (1901–1981), actor
- Dietrich Fischer-Dieskau (1925–2012), singer, conductor
- Max Jakob Friedländer (1867–1958), art historian
- Gunter Gabriel (1942–2017), singer and composer
- Vadim Glowna (1941–2012), actor
- Curt Goetz* (1888–1960), actor and writer
- Rolf von Goth (1906–1981), actor, writer
- Uwe Gronostay (1939–2008), chorus conductor, composer
- Anneliese Groscurth (1910–1996), physician, German resistance
- Georg Groscurth (1904–1944), physician, German resistance
- George Grosz* (1893–1959), painter
- Käthe Haack (1897–1986), actress
- Thea von Harbou* (1888–1954), screenwriter, novelist, film director and actress
- Maximilian Harden* (1861–1927), journalist and writer
- Alfred Helberger* (1871–1946), painter
- Frieda Hempel (1885–1955), opera singer
- Jo Herbst (1928–1980), comedian
- Klaus Herm (1925–2014), actor
- Hilde Hildebrand (1897–1976), actress
- Paul Höffer (1895–1949), composer
- Walter Höllerer (1922–2003), literature scientist
- Claus Holm (1918–1996), actor
- Arno Holz* (1863–1929), poet and dramatist
- Hermann Jansen* (1869–1945), architect
- Curt Joël (1865–1945), politician
- Karl John, (1905–1977), actor
- Hans Junkermann (1879–1943), actor
- Margarete Klose (1899–1968), opera singer
- Franz Teddy Kleindin (1914–2007), Jazz musician, composer ("Klarinettenzauber"), arranger
- Georg Kolbe* (1877–1947), sculptor
- Viktor de Kowa* (1904–1973), actor
- August Kraus* (1868–1934), sculptor and painter
- Evelyn Künneke (1921–2001), singer and actress
- Eduard Künneke (1885–1953), composer
- Helmut „Fiffi“ Kronsbein (1914–1991), soccer player and trainer
- Helene Lange* (1848–1930), feminist and politician
- Leopold Langstein* (1876–1933), child physician
- Melvin J. Lasky (1920–2004), American writer, editor
- Valérie von Martens (1894–1986), actress
- Karlheinz Martin* (1886–1948), director of the Hebbel-Theater
- Valérie von Martens (1894–1986), actress
- Günter Meisner (1926–1994), actor
- Hermann Minkowski* (1864–1909), mathematician and physicist
- Oskar Minkowski* (1858–1931), internalist
- Hans Joachim Moser (1889–1967), music scientist
- Hermann Müller (1885–1947), marathon runner and race walker
- Walter Neusel (1907–1964), boxer
- Hildegard Ochse (1935–1997), photographer
- Albert Panschow*, Stadtältester
- Heinz Pehlke (1922–2002), cinematographer
- Josef Pelz von Felinau, writer
- Ernst Pepping (1901–1981), composer
- Werner Peters (1918–1971), actor and film producer
- Werner Pittschau (1902–1928), actor
- Hans-Michael Rehberg (1938–2017), actor
- Günter Rexrodt (1941–2004), politician
- Walter Richter (1905–1985), actor
- Joachim Ringelnatz* (1883–1934), writer, poet
- Ulrich Roski (1944–2003), singer-songwriter
- Willi Rose (1902–1978), actor
- Oscar Sabo (1881–1969), actor
- Hans Sahl (1902–1993), writer
- Oskar Sala (1910–2002), composer
- Hermann Scheer (1944–2010), politician
- Marcellus Schiffer (1892–1932), lyricist
- Heinrich Schnee (1871–1949), lawyer, last Governor of German East Africa
- August Scholtis* (1901–19690), writer
- Gustav Scholz (1930–2000), boxer, better known as Bubi Scholz
- Margarete Schön (1895–1985), actress
- Hannelore Schroth (1922–1987), actress
- Johannes Heinrich Schultz (1894–1970), physician, inventor of autogenic training
- Carl Schuhmann* (1869–1946), sportsman, many medals
- Guido Seeber (1879–1940), cinematographer
- Leonard Steckel* (1901–1971), actor and theatre director
- Ludwig Suthaus (1906–1971), opera singer
- Katharina Szelinski-Singer (1918–2010), sculptor
- Michiko Tanaka (1909–1988), actress, singer
- Sylke Tempel (1963–2017), author and journalist
- Jakob Tiedtke (1875–1960), actor
- Willy Trenk-Trebitsch, (1902–1983), actor
- Dinorah Varsi (1939–2013), pianist
- Walter Volle (1913–2002), rower, gold medal winner Olympia 1936
- Kurt Wegner* (1898–1964), local politician
- Paul Wegener* (1874–1948), actor
- Grethe Weiser* (1903–1970), actress
- Dorothea Wieck (1908–1986), actress
- Agnes Windeck (1888–1975), actress
- Klausjürgen Wussow (1929–2007), actor
- Augusta von Zitzewitz (1880–1960), painter

== Gallery ==
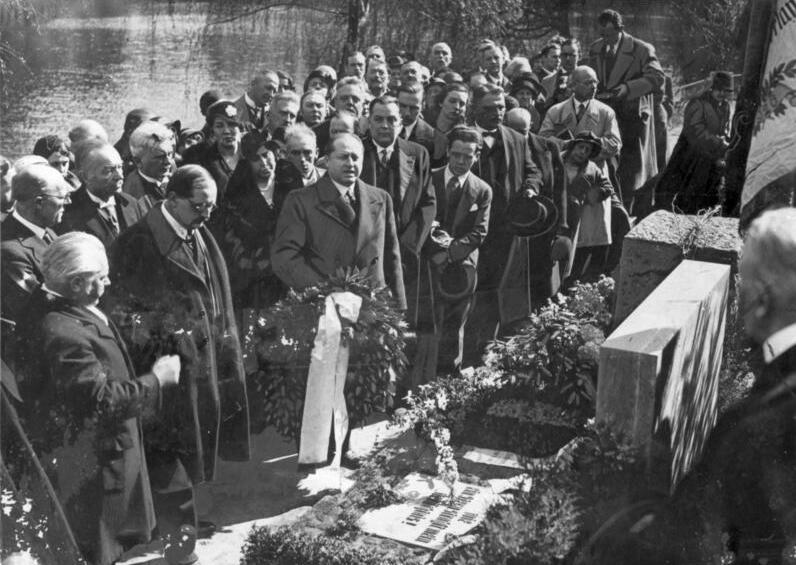
Gottfried Benn at the grave of Arno Holz

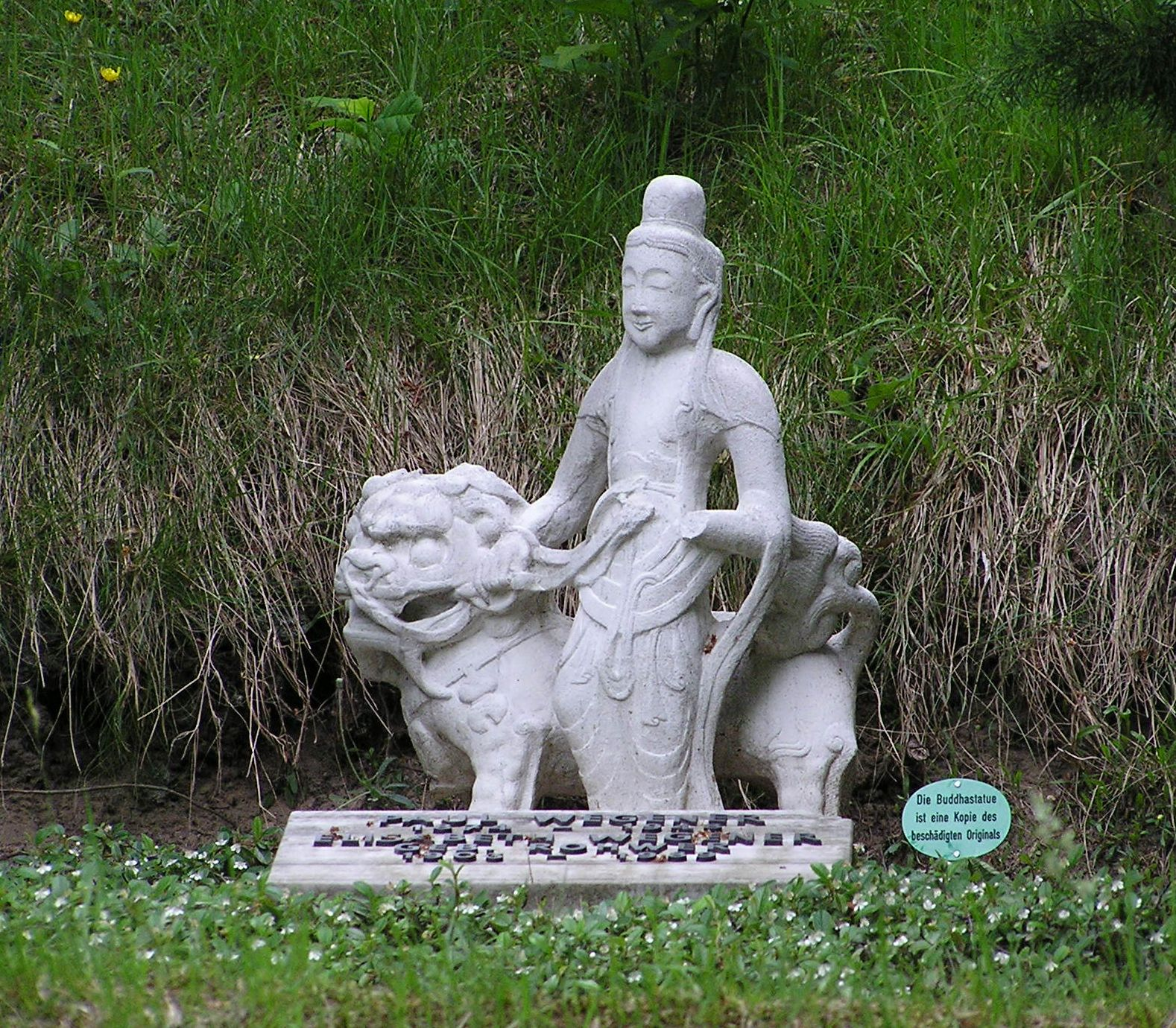
Actor Paul Wegener

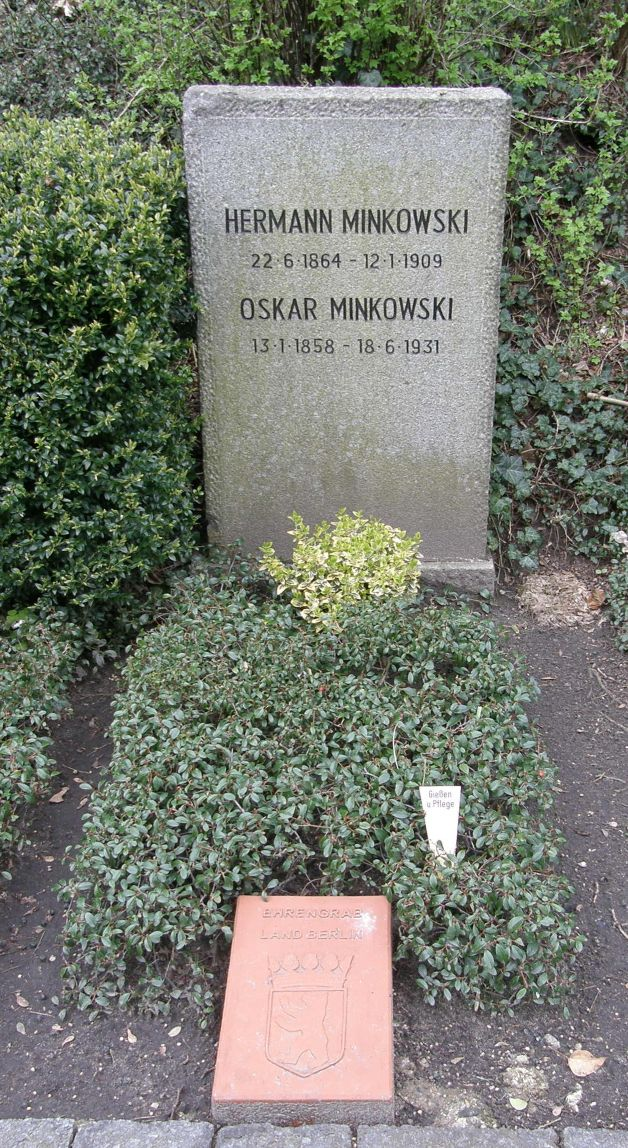
Hermann Minkowski with Oskar Minkowski

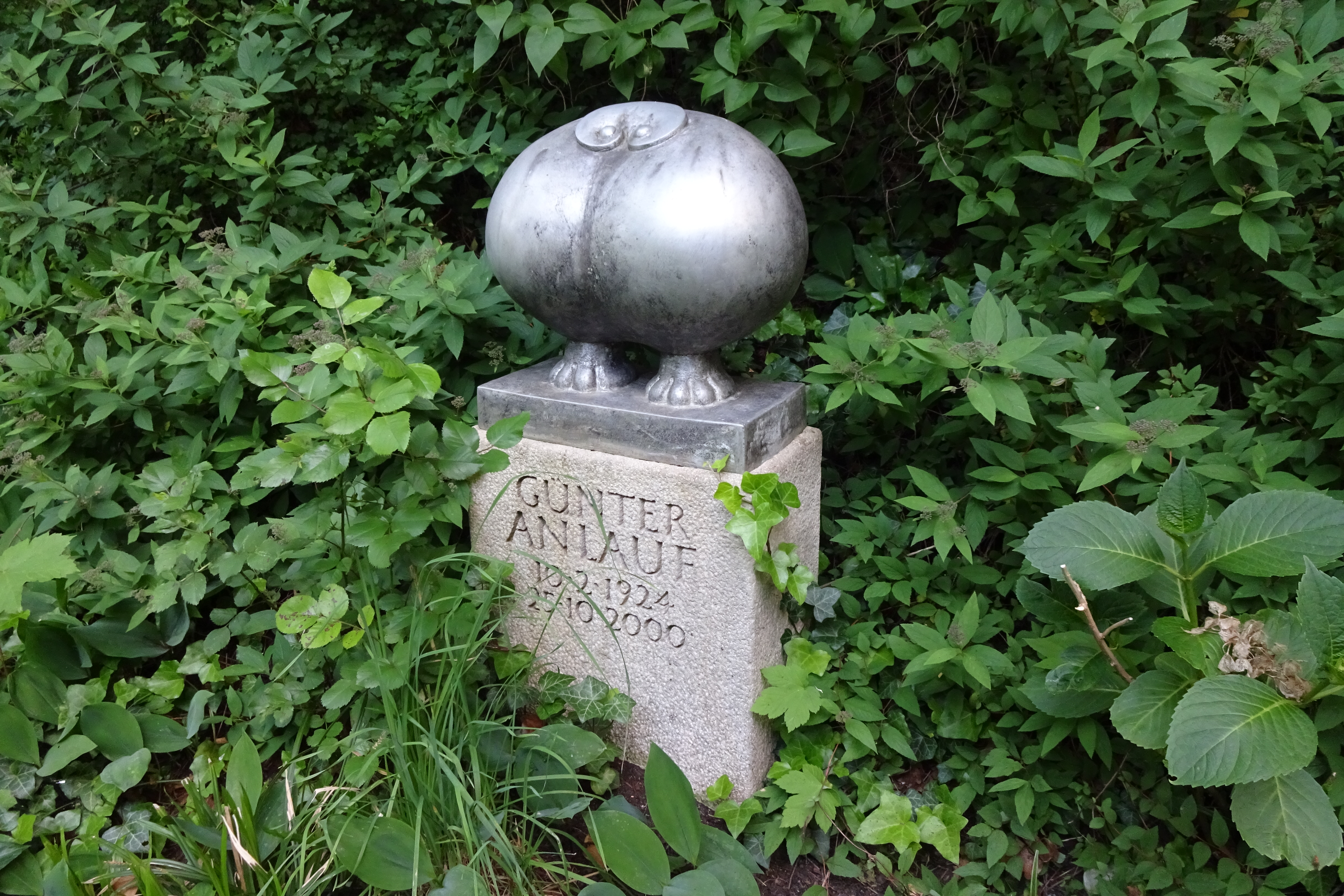
Günter Anlauf, sculptor
