= Krista Lavíčková =

Czech secretary and German Resistance member (1912–1943)

- Born: 15 December 1917; Moravská Ostrava, Czechoslovakia
- Died: 11 August 1944 (aged 26); Plötzensee Prison; Berlin, Nazi Germany
- Cause of death: Decapitation
- Occupations: Resistance member, secretary
- Known for: Member of European Union resistance group
- Parents: Paul Hatschek (father); Elli Hatschek (mother)

Krista Lavíčková (15 December 1917–11 August 1944) was a Czech secretary who fought against Nazism with the German Resistance group, the European Union. She was arrested on 3 September 1943 and was tried along with her father, Paul Hatschek, at the Volksgerichtshof ("People's Court"). Her father's second wife, Elli Hatschek, was arrested with her father, but was tried at a later date. All were sentenced to death, three of the sixteen members of the European Union who were executed by the Third Reich.

== Biographical details ==
Lavíčková, née Hatschek, was born in Moravian Ostrava, Czechoslovakia. As an adult, she lived in Prague, where she worked as a secretary. She was involved with the German Resistance group, the European Union, whose members were from various European nations. On 3 September 1943, she was arrested by the Nazis. Tried with her father at the Nazi "People's Court", they were both sentenced to death on 27 March 1944. Before her execution, she was imprisoned at the Barnimstrasse women's prison, in Berlin. Her father's second wife, Elli Hatschek, was arrested with her father, but was tried separately. She was also sentenced to death, charged with being connected to the European Union and with Wehrkraftzersetzung, a crime which included "undermining the military". Lavíčková's father was executed by fallbeil ("falling axe") on May 15, 1944 at Brandenburg-Görden Prison. Lavíčková was executed at Plötzensee Prison on August 11, 1944. Including Lavíčková, her father and step-mother, there were sixteen members of the European Union executed by the Nazis. The record of her execution states, "The convict, who was calm and composed, was laid on the falling axe apparatus without resistance, whereupon the executioner performed the beheading with the guillotine and then reported that the sentence was carried out. The sentence was carried out in 7 seconds, from leading [the prisoner to the guillotine] to notification of completion." Elli Hatschek was not tried until November 1944. On 8 December 1944, like Lavíčková, she was executed by guillotine at Plötzensee Prison.

Lavíčková was married. Her farewell letter, written before her execution, is addressed to Ilsinko and Friedl. (Note: The letter was written on both sides of a lined sheet of paper. At the bottom of the first are printed instructions from her Nazi captors, "Only use the lines! No writing in the margins!")

My dear Ilsinko and Friedl,

Now it has arrived, that which we never awaited. When you receive my letter, I will no longer be in pain. My beloved, I am glad that I was able to say goodbye to you yesterday. I know that this is wrenching for you, but you must think about what you told me. Only look forward! For life, it's enough when someone has another person for whom he lives and you both have that. You know my last wishes. The inheritance from Father that should fall to me, belongs to you, Ilsinko. And my biggest request of you is please do not leave my dearest Honza alone in the difficult hours that await him, until he has again found his inner peace. If there is an afterlife, then I will live for him and for you both. In my horoscope, it says that death will find me fully conscious and so will it be for me too, when it comes in a few hours. You can believe me, I am completely calm and partly glad that all sorrow has an end. If I still feel any anguish at all now, it is in thoughts about you. But I know, you have so much vitality, that with time, you will emerge from this pain and I will pray for you in my last hour, that it will be your last and that from now on, everything turns toward the good. I will see my Mama, beloved above all, and my loving Father again and I am very glad for this. The attached letter to Honza, please give to him personally—and in a moment that you find appropriate. Give my love to everyone I have loved, especially Hana, Pepo and Viktor.

Once again, thank you for all your love, for your courage and sacrifice. In spirit, I embrace you for the last time and close with the words, Errare humanum — post tenebras spero lucem!

Your Krista

— Krista Lavíčková, farewell letter before her execution
