= Paul Hatschek =

Czech optical engineer and a member of the German Resistance (1888–1944)

Paul Hatschek (11 March 1888 – 15 May 1944) was a Czech engineer of optical and film technology and a member of the German Resistance against Nazism during the Third Reich. He was involved with Robert Uhrig and then became a leading member of the resistance group, the European Union. According to Robert Havemann, Hatschek was under Gestapo surveillance for years. He was arrested in 1943 and subjected to intensive interrogation, resulting in him giving the Nazis numerous names of fellow resistance members. His daughter and his wife were among those arrested. All three were brought before the Volksgerichtshof and sentenced to death. He was executed at Brandenburg-Görden Prison in May 1944; his wife and daughter were executed at Plötzensee Prison, his daughter in May 1944, his wife in December 1944.

== Work and biographical details ==
Hatschek was granted a Canadian patent for a "projection apparatus" on 27 July 1926. On 3 January 1928 he received an American patent for an "optical projection apparatus" for which he filed on 2 October 1923. In 1931, he began publishing articles on sound film technology in German technical journals.

Hatschek was first listed in the Berlin directory in 1934. In 1935, he lived in a small apartment in Berlin-Wilmersdorf. Though he followed the 1936 Summer Olympics, apparently without criticism of the Third Reich, by 1939, he had decided to join the resistance group, the European Union. The group was formed by Robert Havemann, a scientist and Georg Groscurth, a medical doctor. He was recruited by the GRU and tried to pass information along to the Soviet Union.

The German historian Bernd Florath writes, "The Czech citizen Hatschek was an engineer in optics and film technology. His research and inventions were primarily concerned with sound film technology. Among others, he worked with Manfred von Ardenne and Hugh John Gramatzki, who corresponded with Albert Einstein. [Hatschek] published a series of books, that were reprinted and translated, even after his death. In Prague in 1937, he offered the Soviet Union some inventions and was afterward recruited as a contact for the GRU. Hatschek worked in Berlin for the Tobis Filmgesellschaft as a patent engineer. He was in contact with the Robert Uhrig Group and as a result, in spring 1942, was briefly arrested, though quickly released." The Gestapo considered the European Union to be especially dangerous because the organization was multi-national and the members were intellectuals.

According to Robert Havemann, one of the founders of the German Resistance group, the European Union, Hatschek was a leading member of the group. Havemann said Hatschek was under surveillance for years and that this fact was what led to the group's discovery by the Gestapo. In 1943, the Gestapo observed Hatschek meeting two parachute landings. After an investigation, they arrested Hatschek and his wife, Elli, on 3 September 1943. The Gestapo began an intensive interrogation of him that same day. Under interrogation, Hatschek revealed names of other group members and two days later, the Gestapo arrested every person Hatschek had named. By the end, they had arrested over 40 European Union members.

Hatschek was tried with his daughter, Krista Lavíčková, a secretary, on 27 March 1944 and was sentenced to death at the Nazi "People's Court" (Volksgerichtshof). He was executed on 15 May 1944 at Brandenburg-Görden Prison. On 4 November 1944 the People's Court brought his wife to trial for her connections to the European Union and Wehrkraftzersetzung and sentenced to death. She was executed on 8 December 1944 at Plötzensee Prison. His daughter was executed at Plötzensee Prison on 11 August 1944.

== Published work ==
- "Grundlagen des Tonfilms", Halle (1931); 5th edition, Halle (1942); 9th -11th editions, Halle (1950)
- "Die Rhytmographie" in: Filmtechnik/Filmkunst, 7/7 (7 February 1931), 6-8
- "Was muß jeder vom Tonfilm wissen?" Leipzig (1933)
- with Rolf Wigand, "Niederfrequenzverstärker: Planung, Berechnung und Bau von Niederfrequenzverstärkern und Verstärkeranlagen", Berlin (1933)
- "Die Photozelle im Dienst der Tonfilmwiedergabe", Halle (1933), 2nd -4th editions (1948)
- "Darf der Radiohändler Lautsprecher für Tonfilmzwecke verkaufen?" in: Elektroton und Schallplatte. Beilage für Kraftverstärker, Nadel- und Lichttonwiedergabe, (=Beilage von Der Radio-Händler), Nr. 1, (1935) p. 77f
- "Die Wunder der Zeitdehnung und Zeitraffung" in: Die Filmwelt (30 August 1936)
- "Fortschritte der Funktechnik und ihrer Grenzgebiete". (Handbuch der Funktechnik und ihrer Grenzgebiete / Revised and edited by M. v. Ardenne; W. Fehr (and others). Vol. [4 = Erg. Vol. 1]. Stuttgart (1936)
- Optik des Unsichtbaren, Eine Einführung in die Welt der Elektronen-Optik, Stuttgart (1937)
- with Rolf Wigand, Niederfrequenz-Verstärker und Uebertragungsanlagen. 2nd edition Berlin (1938)
- "Neue physikalische Erkenntnisse im Dienst der Magie" in: Das neue Universum. Vol. 60, (1939)
- Radiotechnique. Les principes acoustiques et électriques et leurs applications. Written in collaboration by M.V. Ardenne, W. Fehr, Hanns Gunther, Paul Hatschek, Paul Jaray, E. Nesper, Th. Schultes, W. Steindorff, R. Thun, Rolf Wigand, H. Wigge. Translated from the German by R. Springer. Orléans : Impr. nouvelle; Paris : Dunod (1939)
- Optik für Praktiker. Halle (1941), 2nd edition. (1948) revised by Hugo John Ivan Gramatzki
- Electron-optics, translated by Arthur Palme. Boston (1944), 2nd edition, Boston (1948)
