= Marcus Behmer =

German graphic artist

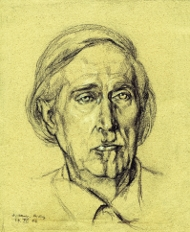
- Portrait of Marcus Behmer by Dorothea Werner
- Born: October 1, 1879; Weimar, German Empire
- Died: September 12, 1958 (aged 78); West Berlin, West Germany

Marcus Michael Douglas Behmer (1 October 1879 – 12 September 1958), also known by the pseudonyms Marcotino and Maurice Besnaux, was a German illustrator, graphic designer and painter. He was the first well-known German artist to publicly admit to homosexuality.

== Biography ==
Behmer was born in Weimar, son of the painter Hermann Behmer and grandson of Friedrich Behmer, Oberamtmann of Merzien (now part of Köthen in Saxony-Anhalt) and his wife Elise, youngest daughter of the poet Philippine Engelhard. His father's twin brother Rudolf Behmer (1831–1902) was known as a breeder of Merino sheep; their sister Louise was married to Heinrich von Nathusius (1824–1890). Marcus' brother Joachim Behmer was also an artist. Behmer, in a letter, dates his artistic beginnings to about 1896.

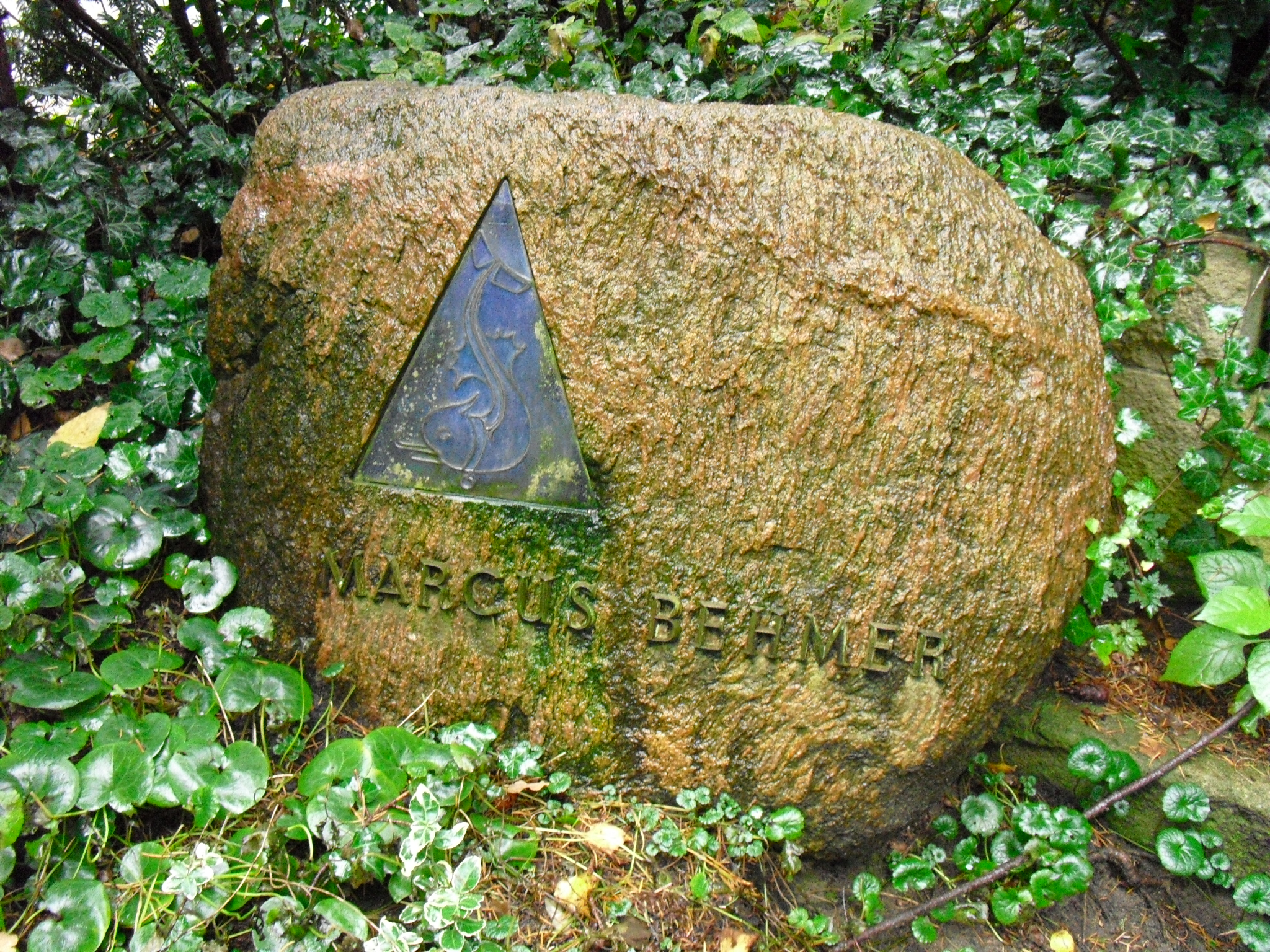
Marcus Behmer's grave in Friedhof Heerstraße, Berlin-Westend

On 1 October 1903, Behmer joined the army. He was made a corporal on 10 June 1904 and promoted on 22 September 1907 to sergeant. From 1914 he served in World War I in Flanders and in Poland. In the summer of 1917 he fell seriously ill "after an operation in the field" and spent six weeks in the field hospital at Jarny in north-eastern France. During his time in the army, he produced many so-called "comrades' portraits", usually finely crafted miniature profile views of young soldiers.

In 1898 Behmer made the acquaintance of Karl Walser, also an admirer of Aubrey Beardsley, with whom he remained friends for the rest of his life. He launched his career as a professional artist in 1900 and over the next three years contributed 66 drawings to the monthly magazine Die Insel (The Island ) for Insel Verlag, the satirical weekly Simplicissimus, and other Munich publications. From 1902 on Behmer created book illustrations, designed initials and texts and was responsible for carefully planned book productions, with the Cranach Press of Harry Graf Kessler and others. With Insel Verlag he had his first major success with his illustrations for Wilde's Salome in 1903. Behmer's early works show the strong influence of the illustrative art of Aubrey Beardsley, which later allowed some negative assessments of his work as imitative, though he soon developed his own artistic language parallel to the rise of Expressionism and the new currents of the Wiener Werkstätte. He also designed an internationally recognised work, the series of illustrations for Philipp Otto Runge's Von dem Fischer un syner Fru ("The Fisherman and His Wife").

Behmer also worked for other publishers, for example the Paul Cassirer Verlag, which produced one of his major works, a series of 40 etchings created in 1912 for an edition of Voltaire's Zadig. Like many artists of the Buchkunstbewegung, Behmer ran into financial difficulties in the 1920s, but he remained committed to what he called the "small format" instead of striving for a gallery-based artistic career as did others such as Alfred Kubin, to whom Behmer compared himself in later years.

In created his own antiqua-style typeface in the 1920's and cast it in cast in the Klingspor foundry, a building that has since become a museum and houses a large collection of Behmer's work.

Behmer was close friends with, among others, the family of the writer Ernst Hardt, with the painter Alexander Olbricht and also with the sculptor and painter Dorothea Werner (born Leiding) and her husband.

From 1903 he was a member in Berlin of the WhK (Wissenschaftlich-humanitäre Komitee), the first homosexual movement in the world. Behmer was arrested in December 1936 and convicted on charges of homosexuality by a court in Konstanz. He was sentenced to two years in prison and served 19 months in prisons in Stockach, Konstanz and Freiburg im Breisgau, emerging in July 1938. In his prison diaries he accepted his punishment, rejecting the idea that God would punish him as the law had for sexual behavior but accepting it as divine punishment for his sins of pride and self-satisfaction. He wrote:

In order to be able to endure what God has decreed for me, I have to make this one thought clear to myself with the utmost strength, so that it is present to me every second, even the most dreadful and desperate one, as the very last: that nothing can happen to me which God does not send me.

At times he was given the opportunity to work as an artist in prison. The works produced in this period are mostly calligraphically designed panels of Greek text (prayers and Bible quotations), as well as drawings full of bitterness and irony.

From 1943 Behmer lived at the family home of Donata Helmrich, the daughter of Ernst Hardt, in Berlin-Charlottenburg. He lost almost all of his possessions, including hundreds of drawings, graphics and printing plates, when the Westend neighborhood of Berlin was bombed in November 1944. He then went to live at Groẞ Nuhnen, the country estate of the Werner family near Frankfurt an der Oder. The rest of his life was spent in poverty in West Berlin, where Dorothea Werner took care of him in 1958 until his death.

Behmer died in West Berlin at age 78, on 12 September 1958. He was buried in the Heerstraße Cemetery in the present district of Berlin-Westend.

The Senate of Berlin ordered in 1965 that Behmer's grave (plot 8-C-54) should be dedicated as an Ehrengrab ("grave of honour") of the Land Berlin. The original dedication expired in 2011; the Senate renewed it in 2018 for the usual time period of 20 years.

Renowned museums and collections such as the graphics collection of the Städel Museum in Frankfurt, the Klingspor Museum for calligraphy and typography in Offenbach and the Sternweiler collection in Berlin today house works by Behmer. A critical appraisal of his work is only now being undertaken and his art-historical importance realized.

== Selected works ==
=== Graphics ===
- Numerous bookplates, usually etched
- Various invitations and programme cards
- Numerous New Year's wishes sent to friends, mostly etchings, with both metaphorical and political motifs (including between 1931 and 1934 critical comments on the seizure of power by the National Socialists).
- Numerous erotic works, often etchings, with explicit and imaginative gay symbolism.
- Ten silhouettes by Marcus Behmer. A New Year's gift for the Friends of the Kunstbibliothek, produced by W. Büxenstein. Berlin 1930.
- Ten-Mark banknote (using a silhouette) for the state printer, 1919.

=== Book illustrations ===
- Annemarie von Nathusius: Freie Worte. Eckstein, Berlin, 1902
- Oscar Wilde: Salome. Insel Verlag, Leipzig, 1903
- Honoré de Balzac: Das Mädchen mit den Goldaugen. German translation by Ernst Hardt. Insel Verlag, Leipzig, 1904
- Herman Bang: Excentrische Novellen. Illustrations and title pages by Behmer. Berlin, S. Fischer, 1905.
- Ernst Hardt: Ninon von Lenclos. Drama in one act. Insel Verlag, Leipzig, 1905
- Ernst Hardt: Tantris der Narr. Drama in 5 acts. Breitkopf & Härtel for Insel Verlag, Leipzig, 1907; book design as well.
- Voltaire: Zadig. IX. Work of the Pan Press, published by Paul Cassirer, Berlin, 1912
- Brothers Grimm: Sechs Märchen. Brandus, Berlin, 1918
- Ecclesiastes oder der Prediger Salomo. Holten, Berlin, 1920
- Von dem Fischer un syner Fru. Insel Verlag, Leipzig, 1920 (Insel-Bücherei Nr. 315), also handset by Behmer
- Euphorion Verlag: Verlagsbericht über das Gründungsjahr. With a title etching by Marcus Behmer and an original lithograph by Hermann Struck. Berlin 1920
- Der Prophet Jona nach Luther. Insel Verlag, Leipzig, 1920–30, reprinted 1983: Insel-Bücherei Nr 1018/2
- Johannes Secundus (J.N. Everaerts): Basia. Officina Serpentis, Berlin, 1921
- Oscar Wilde: Die heilige Buhlerin. Berlin, Tillgner, 1921 (Note: Wilde's work is also known in German as Die fromme Kurtisane.)
- Enno Littmann: Vom morgenländischen Floh. Dichtung und Wahrheit über den Floh bei Hebräern, Syriern, Arabern, Abessiniern und Türken. With 13 original etchings. Insel Verlag, Leipzig, 1925

=== Binding designs ===
- Fontane, Theodor, Effi Briest, Berlin, Officina Serpentis, 1926–27; with illustrations by Max Liebermann. (Note: Five letters by Behmer about this binding along with the volume itself were offered at auction in 2020.)

=== Musical compositions / Songs based on poems ===
- Eduard Mörike: Denk' es o Seele! (Berlin, Birkholz, 1922; written in 1917 in the field hospital at Jarny)
- Paul Verlaine: Le ciel est, pardessus le toit... (Berlin, Birkholz, 1925)
- Emil Kuh: Hirschlein ging im Wald spazieren (after the children's song, set for voice and piano by Marcus Behmer). For the "19th", 22 July 1943 (privately printed for Konstantin [Greiff-Helmrich] in a very small edition)

== Selected exhibitions ==
=== Solo exhibitions ===
- 2018 - (11 July – 2 September) Klingspor Museum, Offenbach am Main: "Delphine in Offenbach. Marcus Behmer. Meister der kleinen Formate" ("Delphine in Offenbach. Marcus Behmer. Master of the small formats"), for the 60th anniversary of Behmer's death
- 2009 (1 October) Galerie im Antiquariat Marcus Haucke, Berlin, for Behmer's 130th birthday
- 2008 (24 July – 2 September) - Galerie Buchholz, Berlin
- 2008 - "Täfele" ("Panels"). Antiquariat & Galerie Marcus Haucke, Berlin
- 2000 - Antiquariat & Galerie Marcus Haucke, Berlin
- 1979 - Stadtmuseum, Weimar
- 1979 - Stadtbibliothek, Berlin-Ost
- 1979 - Klingspor-Museum, Offenbach
- 1978 - Galerie Werner Kunze, Berlin
- 1978 - 1979 - Kunstkreis Novo Industrie, Mainz
- 1958 - Klingspor Museum, Offenbach
- 1958 - 1959 - Ehemals Staatliche Museen Berlin / Kunstbibliothek, Berlin
- 1956 - Städelsches Kunstinstitut, Frankfurt am Main
- 1954 - Kunstamt Charlottenburg, Berlin
- 1952 - "Arbeiten aus 50 Jahren" ("Works of 50 Years"), Horst Stobbe Bücherstube, München
- 1951 - Galerie Springer, Berlin
- 1950 - Galerie Rosen, Berlin
- 1947 - A. Wollbrück & Co. Buchhandlung und Antiquariat, Berlin
- 1927 - Kunstbibliothek, Berlin
- 1912 - "An exhibition of drawings, etchings and ex libris by Marcus Behmer", Berlin Photographic Company, New York
- 1910 - Exhibition in the studio of Alexander Olbricht, Weimar
- 1904 - "Marcus Behmer, Zeichnungen, Aquarelle, Holzschnitte" ("Marcus Behmer, drawings, watercolours, woodcuts"), Kunstverein, Jena

=== Group exhibitions ===
- 1997 – "Goodbye to Berlin. 100 Jahre Schwulenbewegung" ("Goodbye to Berlin. 100 Years of the Gay Movement)". Schwules Museum, Berlin
- 1984 – "Eldorado", Berlin Museum, Berlin
- 1980 – "Der gekrümmte Horizont - Kunst in Berlin 1945-1967" ("The Crooked Horizon - Art in Berlin 1945-1967", Academy of Arts, Berlin
- 1929 – "Das deutsche illustrierte Buch von 1880 bis 1929" ("The German Illustrated Book from 1880 to 1929", Horst Stobbe Bücherstube, Munich
- 1909 – "Winterausstellung der Sezession" ("Winter Exhibition of the Secession")(graphics), Akademie der Künste, Berlin
- 1905 – "Alexander Olbricht, Marcus Behmer (Zeichnungen, Radierungen, Holzschnitte)" ("Alexander Olbricht, Marcus Behmer: drawings, etchings, wooodcuts"), Kunstverein, Jena
- 1903 – Secession, Berlin
- 1902 – "Vienna Secession 13th Exhibition", Vienna
- 1900 – "Vienna Secession 8th Exhibition", Vienna
