= Elli Hatschek =

Member of the German Resistance (1901–1944)

- Gestapo photo of Elli Hatschek (October 1943)
- Born: Elli Lotz; July 2, 1901; Wetzlar, Germany
- Died: December 8, 1944 (aged 43); Plötzensee Prison
- Cause of death: Execution by guillotine
- Occupation: European Union resistance member
- Criminal charge: Wehrkraftzersetzung
- Criminal penalty: Death
- Spouse: Paul Hatschek

Elli Hatschek (July 2, 1901 – December 8, 1944) was a member of the German Resistance against Nazism. She was married to Paul Hatschek, a leading member of the resistance group, the European Union and who was arrested by the Gestapo in 1943. Under heavy interrogation, he gave up the names of others in his group, who were then arrested. His wife was also arrested. Though she was not heavily involved, she was charged with "undermining the morale of the military" and was sentenced to death. She was executed by the Nazis at Plötzensee Prison.

== Biography ==
Elli Hatschek, née Lotz, was born in Wetzlar, Germany. She was the second wife of Paul Hatschek, a Ph.D. and engineer of optical and film technology. They lived in Berlin, where he was one of the leading members of the German Resistance group, the European Union and worked to bring about the downfall of the Third Reich. He was recruited by the Soviet Union's military intelligence and tried to provide important information to the Soviets to assist them in expelling their Nazi invaders. He was arrested in 1942 as a member of the Robert Uhrig Group and according to Robert Havemann, had been under Gestapo surveillance for years.

Hatschek was told of her husband's activities and she was supportive. In 1943, the Gestapo observed Paul Hatschek meeting two parachutists. After investigating, the Gestapo arrested Hatschek on September 3, 1943, subjecting him to intensive interrogation that same day. He named fellow Resistance fighters and two days later, the Gestapo arrested every person Hatschek had named. After weeks of interrogation, sometimes brutal, they had over 40 members of the European Union.

Elli Hatschek was arrested with her husband. Her husband's daughter, Krista Lavíčková was also arrested. All three were brought before the Nazi court, her husband and his daughter together; Elli Hatschek, some months later. All three were sentenced to death and executed by guillotine, (Note: The Nazis executed people by firing squad, gallows and guillotine. Death by firing squad was considered to be the most honorable and was used for military personnel. Hanging was the most preferred for its value as a public spectacle, but beheading was used for crimes of treason and related crimes. (See "The execution of women by the Nazis during World War II".)) her husband on May 15, 1944, at Brandenburg-Görden Prison, his daughter at Plötzensee on August 11, 1944.

In November 1944, Elli Hatschek was charged with being connected with the European Union and with Wehrkraftzersetzung, a term that means "subversion of the military" and under the Nazis, was a crime that included undermining the war effort. (Note: The term "Wehrkraftzersetzung" is also translated as "undermining military morale" and as "sedition and defeatism", as in the 1944 conviction of Oskar Kusch, one of two U-boat commanders to be condemned to death. According to the Oxford Companion to World War II, the term was also used with deserters.) She was convicted and sentenced to death. She was incarcerated at the Barnimstrasse women's prison, where she was one of the 300 prisoners who were executed. She was guillotined on December 8, 1944, at the Plötzensee Prison in Berlin.

Her name is listed in the memorial book of Plötzensee victims.

== See also ==
- Glossary of Nazi Germany: W – explanation of the crime of Wehrkraftzersetzung
