= Anneliese Groscurth =

Anneliese Groscurth

Anneliese Groscurth (German: [ˈanəˌliːzə ˈɡʁɔsˌkʊʁt]; 1910–1996) was the wife of Georg Groscurth and a member of the European Union (Europäische Union), an antifascist German resistance group in Berlin, during the Nazi era. Her husband and all but one of the other central members of the group were executed, but she survived.

== Resistance activity ==
Groscurth was supportive of the "European Union" (EU) and was involved in its activities. The EU was founded by Groscurth's husband, also a doctor and Robert Havemann, a chemist, as well as two other of their friends, architect Herbert Richter and his neighbor, dentist Paul Rentsch. The EU produced political leaflets and hid Jews and other people hunted by the Nazis, feeding them, supplying them with new identification papers, and giving them information. The group grew to about 50 people, including Germans and many non-German forced laborers.

== Arrest and punishment ==
The Gestapo happened to observe two parachute landings and the EU member, Paul Hatschek, who had gone to meet them. After the Gestapo felt they had enough information from their investigations, they arrested Hatschek on September 3, 1943, subjecting him to intensive interrogation on that same day. Two days later, the Gestapo arrested every single person Hatschek had named. By the end, they had over 40 members of the EU; the number of forced laborers arrested, but not brought before a court, is unknown. The Jews hidden by the EU were sent to Auschwitz, where about half of them were killed.

There were more than 12 trials before the People's Court. Of those, 15 were sentenced to death and 13 were executed. Two died while being interrogated. Havemann survived because his execution kept being postponed, due to intervention from the biochemists he had earlier worked with. His execution was postponed often enough that he was eventually freed by the Red Army. Georg Groscurth, Richter and Rentsch were executed at Brandenburg-Görden Prison on May 8, 1944. Other group members were indicted before other courts.

In his farewell letter to his wife, written just before his execution, Georg Groscurth wrote, "Dear, good Anneliese, now it is time. In half an hour, the sentence will be carried out. I am composed because I have always known this could happen. They're rattling the keys already. Let me embrace you. Dwell on this: that we're dying for a better future, for a life without man's hatred for man."

== Postwar harassment ==
EU survivors were denied the reparations payments mandated by the 1949 German Restitution Laws. They were even denied or experienced delays receiving pension and death benefits or the return of property after the war.

Groscurth, an outspoken left-leaning woman, though unaffiliated with any political party, experienced difficulties after the war. As former Nazis returned to their old jobs, they made her life difficult. She worked as a doctor in Charlottenburg in the city's health department and suffered attempts to interfere with her ability to be paid through national health insurance and calls for a boycott of her practice. She spoke out against the rearmament of Germany and she was defamed as a Communist, a severe charge in the Cold War era. In 1951, she was let go, without notice, from her job as a doctor. Until the 1960s, she was denied a passport, for fear of what she might say about Germany while abroad. Until the 1970s, she was even unable to collect her pension.

== Legacy and Memorials ==
The German writer Friedrich Christian Delius grew up in Wehrda with Groscurth's two sons and in 2004, wrote a book that incorporated elements of the lives of their parents. Part autobiography, part crime novel and part the story of Groscurth and her husband's experiences, Mein Jahr als Mörder (My Year as a Murderer) tells the fictional account of a college student who hears that a Nazi judge, Hans-Joachim Rehse, has been released from prison. Becoming enraged because Rehse is now freed from the past, while the family, minus the father, whom Rehse had executed, continues to suffer, the student decides to murder the judge. The novel played an important part in ending 50 years of suppression and neglect of the resistance group and leading to recognition of their contribution.

Groscurth, her husband, Havemann, Richter and Rentsch were honored in 2006 by Yad Vashem by being named Righteous Among the Nations.

Also in 2006, a square in the Westend section of Berlin was renamed for the Groscurth couple.
