= Theodor Däubler =

Poet and cultural critic in the German language

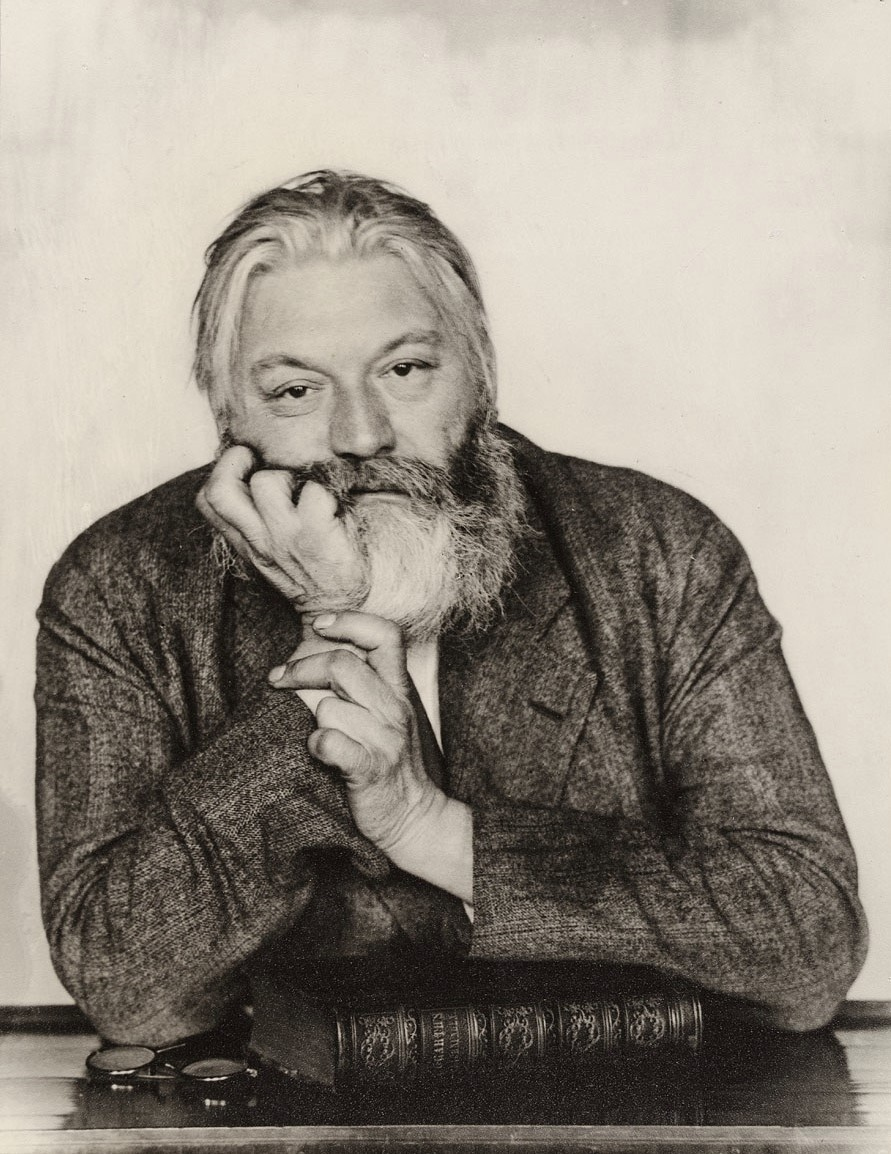
- Portrait of Däubler in 1922
- Born: 17 August 1876; Trieste, Austria-Hungary
- Died: 13 June 1934 (aged 57); Black Forest, Germany
- Occupation: Poet

Theodor Däubler (17 August 1876 – 13 June 1934) was a poet and cultural critic in the German language. He was born in Trieste, then part of Austro-Hungary and has been described as "Trieste's most important German-speaking writer".

== Early life and career ==
Däubler travelled widely throughout the Mediterranean and European countries. His major poem "Das Nordlicht" was first published in 1910. He was close to several participants in Berlin Dada, notably George Grosz and Hans Richter, on whom he wrote the first critical appraisal in Die Aktion.

In May 1922 he attended the International Congress of Progressive Artists and signed the "Founding Proclamation of the Union of Progressive International Artists".

His influence on wider culture include Theodor Adorno in Minima Moralia (paragraph 122) and Adorno set three of his poems to music in "Drei Gedichte von Theodor Däubler" (Opus 8) and Carl Schmitt. However, it appears that none of his major poems has ever been translated into English.

== Death ==
Däubler died at Sankt Blasien and is buried in Friedhof Heerstraße in Berlin.
