= Theodor Korselt =

German jurist and genealogist executed for making critical remarks (1891–1943)

Ernst Julius Theodor Korselt (24 November 1891, Annaberg-Buchholz, Kingdom of Saxony – 25 August 1943) was a German jurist, genealogist, and "homeland researcher" ("Heimatforscher"). The government councillor was sentenced to death for negatively influencing Germany's fighting forces – an offence called Wehrkraftzersetzung in German – after he publicly uttered his opinion that Hitler's resignation was the only way to avoid defeat.

== Life ==
Korselt came from a long-established family from Mittelherwigsdorf. His father, Prof. Dr. Ernst Julius Korselt, was the headteacher at the Realgymnasium in Zittau. His mother Elisabeth, née Koch, was Theodor Koch's daughter. He himself was a jurist, a member of the Landtag, the mayor and a freeman of Buchholz, Kingdom of Saxony.

Theodor Korselt was the eldest of four siblings and his parents' only son. He grew up in Buchholz and went to the Realgymnasium in the neighbourhood of Annaberg, where his father had been teaching since 1886. After finishing school, he studied law and economics at the universities of Leipzig and Geneva. After his father's appointment as headteacher at the Realgymnasium in Zittau, his parents and sisters moved back to his father's hometown in 1911.

After graduating with a doctorate, he had himself trained as an infantryman in Zittau, and fought as a volunteer in the First World War on the Western Front, where he was gravely wounded. Later, Korselt was employed in the administrative service. After the War, the jurist worked as an official of the higher state service in various government offices in Berlin, Leipzig, Chemnitz, Dresden, Freiberg and Rostock, where he was a government councillor in the war damage office.

Besides his professional activities, Korselt had fostered since his time in university an interest in his family's and his homeland's history, and he published many written works.

After the Nazis seized power in 1933, it became apparent to Korselt that to further his career, he would need to join the NSDAP. In his 1934 application to join the Party, Korselt wrote that he would undertake "to further represent his conservative, aristocratic view of the state and the furthering of individualism." His application to join the Party was turned down.

After Germany occupied France came Korselt's deployment in the war administration service, from which he was soon recalled after allegations of fraternizing with the local people.

== The "Crime" ==
After Benito Mussolini was deposed on 25 July 1943, Korselt openly said that "The German people's and the fatherland's salvation from the present difficult situation lies only in a similar reversal to the one in Italy...". This did not sit well with Rostock's mayor, Walter Volgmann, who had reached his position by being, as Korselt put it, a "pure" Party man. The mayor declared that Korselt belonged in a concentration camp.

== Arrest, trial, and death ==
The month had not even ended when Korselt was arrested by the Gestapo. On 18 August, he was transferred from the court prison in Rostock to the detention centre in Berlin-Moabit. On 23 August, Korselt's case was heard by the First Senate of the Volksgerichtshof, presided over by the president Roland Freisler and judges Storbeck, Canabis, Aumüller and Bodinus as well as the accuser Dr. Schultze. Korselt was found guilty of Wehrkraftzersetzung for uttering his remark on a tram in Rostock as to how Hitler needed to step down owing to the unlikelihood of Germany's winning the war with him in charge. The sentence was the loss of his civil rights, and death. On 25 August at 19:15, the sentence was carried out at Plötzensee Prison in Berlin.

After the Second World War, in August 1946, Georgstraße in Zittau was given the new name "Theodor-Korselt-Straße". Another street in Annaberg-Buchholz also bears his name.
