= European Union (resistance group) =

German antifascist resistance group

European Union (German: Europäische Union, German pronunciation: [ˌɔɪ̯.ʁo.ˈpɛː.ɪʃə ʔu.ˈni̯oːn]) was an antifascist resistance group in Nazi Germany, which formed around Anneliese and Georg Groscurth and Robert Havemann. Other important members were Herbert Richter and Paul Rentsch.

== Activity and purpose ==
The Berlin-based resistance group was founded in 1939. Founding members, Robert Havemann, a chemist and Georg Groscurth, a doctor, met each other at the beginning of the 1930s. Rentsch, a dentist, met Groscurth in 1934. Richter, an architect, was Richter's neighbor. They became friends not because of politics, but because of common interests. They were intellectual, free spirits and came to their political views independently.

Three of the four core members of the EU had direct contact with high-level Nazis. When war broke out, both Havemann and Groscurth tried to extend their work in such a way that they wouldn't be called upon to serve in the military. They took on projects from the Heereswaffenamt, biochemical research that was to put Germany in position to use chemical weapons, but neither they nor other scientists were terribly ambitious about the nominal goal. The architect, Richter, received contracts from the Reichshandwerkskammer and got to know and win the trust of Hermann Göring. He was already interested in the Communist Party and the information he learned from his personal contact with Göring filled him with hate for the Nazis and only pushed him further toward the idea of resistance. Groscurth, a doctor, had both Rudolf Hess and Wilhelm Keppler as his patients.

The European Union (EU) stood for the restoration of democratic rights and freedoms and a united, free and socialist Europe. They tried to strengthen the domestic German resistance through contacts with the resistance groups of the foreign forced laborers. It was an international organization organized as a network of smaller groups of individual resistance fighters. They weren't trying to bring down the Nazi regime themselves, which they expected to collapse of its own, rather they worked to create a political structure that could step in, which would be necessary when the Hitler-regime finally fell apart.

In the meantime, the group produced anti-Nazi leaflets and hid Jews and others hunted by the Nazi regime and supplied them with new identification papers, food and information. Many members were already hiding Jews before 1939, feeding and taking care of them and saving them from deportation to concentration camps. Starting in 1942, they also helped foreign forced laborers. In addition, they stayed in contact with several other groups and individuals, through the various contacts of the core members of the group. The EU eventually numbered about 50 people and included many forced laborers from Ukraine, Czechoslovakia and France, making it an international group with a larger perimeter than the Gestapo investigations reveal. This is underscored by the fact that even as the EU was brought down by the wave of arrests, Konstantin Žadkevič was able to keep working with the forced laborers for another month.

== Excerpts from EU flyers ==
The EU wrote a number of leaflets, some with general political messages, others directed to their own group. Below, are excerpts from two leaflets.

We are on the eve of collapse of European fascism, which has, with brute force, destroyed every intellectual and revolutionary organization and endeavor. The fascists, who have raged in Germany for more than a decade, have now also, in all the countries of Europe, crushed all the liberal organizations that sought to halt the madness. The fascists believed this would destroy not only their opponents today, but also the leaders of tomorrow. This is the basis of the Nazi theory of chaos till their demise. This terrible threat, and the ruthless willingness to continue on till Europe has sunk into rubble and ash, works like a morbid solution on the masses of Europe. It is true that Hitler has thrown untold numbers of the best and bravest political fighters into concentration camps; and true that he has broken all the old political organizations, and sought to choke any new attempt before its first breath. But one thing has eluded him, he cannot annhiliate the old and eternal, free and democratic ideas which were born in the big Revolutions of Europe! The number of those who have escaped the Gestapo seem to many to be few, but there are more trained fighters than Hitler suspects. And these revolutionaries were not idle.

The world of tomorrow will have a united, socialist Europe."

In Germany and countries occupied by Hitler, many anti-fascist groups are today still working without connections. Many valuable and skilled political people are still isolated. They're all striving for agreement. This agreement can today only be realized with the elimination of all ideological, dogmatic and religious prejudice. Today, we have no time for such discussions, which mean nothing to the practical political work. The goal is the overthrow of fascism in Europe.

Further in Leaflet No. 35, the EU described their vision of European socialism. They defined what it did and did not mean. "...socialism does not mean the eradication of the bourgeoisie, the suspension of private property and creation of a bloody dictatorship of dogmatic Marxists, [but rather the] elimination of private interests from politics and economy," and a "liberation of the individual from economic paternalism."

Hitler's resettlement operations and the abduction of foreign workers to Germany in huge masses have prepared the ground for a pan-European solution.

Without overcoming the nationalist, private capitalist and imperialist structure of modern Europe, the present victims and the nameless misery of the masses will again be in vain.

== Arrest and punishment ==
The EU was stopped by the Gestapo, not for its activities, but because one of the leading members of the EU, Paul Hatschek had been under heavy surveillance for years. In 1943, the Gestapo observed Hatschek meeting two parachute landings. After they had enough information from their investigations, they arrested Hatschek on September 3, 1943, subjecting him to intensive interrogation that same day. Two days later, the Gestapo arrested every single person Hatschek had named, big and small. After weeks of interrogation, sometimes brutal, they arrested the core group of the forced laborers working with Žadkevič. By the end, they had over 40 members of the EU; the number of forced laborers arrested, but not brought before a court, is unknown. The Jews being hidden by the EU were sent to Auschwitz, where about half of them were killed.

There were more than 12 trials before the People's Court. Of those, 15 were sentenced to death and 13 were executed. Two died while being interrogated. Havemann survived because his execution kept being postponed, due to intervention from the biochemists he had earlier worked with. His execution was postponed often enough that he was eventually freed by the Red Army. Groscurth, Herbert Richter (also known as Richter-Luckian) and Rentsch were executed at Brandenburg-Görden Prison on May 8, 1944. Other group members were indicted before other courts.

In his farewell letter to his wife, written half an hour before his execution, Groscurth wrote, "Dwell on this, that we're dying for a better future, for a life without man's hatred for man."

== Postwar politics and suppression ==
After the war, the story of the EU was widely heralded by the communist government of the German Democratic Republic (GDR), and Havemann became a representative in the Volkskammer. However, in 1956, after Nikita Khrushchev made his "secret speech" revealing the purges and mistakes of Joseph Stalin, Havemann began to find himself increasingly opposed to the government and became a thorn in their side. The Socialist Einheitspartei Deutschlands (SED) government began suppressing information about the EU. In 1963, he was forced to give up his teaching position at Humboldt University and in time, became a leading dissident in the GDR. The SED government was in possession of all the documents relating to the Nazi's investigation of the EU and kept them under lock and key, hoping to ruin Havemann's reputation by finding evidence of betrayal of his comrades. They never found any.

Annelise Groscurth also experienced difficulties. In 1951, she was fired from her job as a doctor, also for political reasons. She spoke out against the rearmament of Germany and although she was not a member of any political party, she was defamed as a Communist, a severe charge in the Cold War era. As former Nazis returned to their old jobs, they made her life difficult. She was unable to get a passport until the 1960s, out of fear of what she might say about Germany while abroad.

EU survivors were denied Wiedergutmachung (reparations payments), as mandated by the 1949 German Restitution Laws. They were even denied or experienced delays receiving money that would normally have been due, such as pension and death benefits or the return of property after the war.

== Memorials and posthumous awards ==
On 7 April 1995, Georg Groscurth was honored with a memorial plaque at the hospital where he had worked, Moabiter Krankenhaus.

On 23 August 2001, the city legislature of Arolsen decided to name a street after Groscurth.

In 2006, five members of the EU, Anneliese and Georg Groscurth, Robert Havemann, Paul Rentsch and Herbert Richter were awarded the title, "Righteous among the Nations" from the Israeli Holocaust memorial, Yad Vashem.

Also in 2006, a square in the Westend section of Berlin was renamed for the Groscurth couple.

On 15 May 2008, the city of Diensdorf-Radlow, dedicated a memorial plaque for Paul Rentsch and Herbert Richter "to commemorate the Richter couple and Rentch, who hid Jews [including] Elisabeth von Scheven, and to remember the crimes that claimed these victims, which began in Diensdorf with the arrest by the Gestapo in the spring of 1943."

Elisabeth von Scheven was deported to Auschwitz after her arrest, but survived and was able to emigrate to the US in 1945.

== Other members ==
- Members of the group who were executed:
  - Vladimir Boisselier (19 September 1907 - 30 October 1944), electrician, Moscow-born Frenchman
  - Walter Caro (resistance fighter) (1899–1945), executed at Auschwitz
  - Jean Cochon (b. 29 July 1916 in Gensac-la-Pallue (Charente); d. 30 October 1944), electrician, Résistance
  - Elli Hatschek (2 July 1901 - 8 December 1944), second wife of Paul Hatschek
  - Krista Lavíčková (15 December 1917 - 11 August 1944), née Hatschek, daughter of Paul Hatschek, secretary
  - Paul Hatschek (11 March 1888 - 15 May 1944), engineer, Czech
  - Kurt Müller (resistance fighter) (1903–1944), executed at Brandenburg Prison
  - Nikolai Savitsch Romanenko (1 May 1911 - 30 October 1944), technician, from the USSR, Kherson region, s. Blakitne. Executed in Brandenburg-Görden Prison.
  - Galina Romanova (1918–1944), doctor, from Ukraine, executed at Berlin-Plötzensee
  - Alexander Westermayer (29 October 1894 in Goslar - 19 June 1944), carpenter
  - Konstantin Žadkevič (also spelled Shadkevitsch or Zadkievicz; 3 August 1910 - 30 October 1944) chemist, Czech
- Not executed due to illness:
  - Heinz Schlag (b. 23 October 1908; d. 1961), doctor
- Other known members:
  - Miron Broser (b. 20 December 1891 in Tula, Russia), translator, sentenced to two years in prison, liberated by U.S. troops; last known translation into German, 1949
  - Oskar Fischer (1892–1955), released
  - James Frichot (b. 2 March 1918 in Boulogne (Seine)), electrician, French, released
  - Helmut Kindler (1912–2008), journalist and publisher, released
  - René Peyriguére (b. 1 June 1917 in Paris), chemist, French, released
  - Wilhelm Hartke (1879–1966), philologist and theologian
