= Galina Romanova =

Ukrainian doctor and member of the German resistance (1918–1944)

Galina Romanova

Galina Romanova (December 25, 1918 – November 3, 1944) was a Ukrainian doctor who was deported to Germany during World War II to provide medical care for forced laborers. She became involved with the German resistance against Nazism and was executed at Berlin-Plötzensee prison.

== Life and career ==
Romanova was born in Romanivka, Yekaterinoslav Governorate, Russian Empire. Her father was a blacksmith. She attended medical school for three years and became a member of the Komsomol. In 1937, her parents were arrested by the domestic secret police, the NKVD and she was expelled from the Komsomol. She studied medicine at the Dnipropetrovsk Medical Institute for five years, but was not able to graduate because of the war. In 1942, she was allowed to graduate and on July 1, 1942, she and other graduates were deported to Nazi Germany and forced to treat forced laborers. She worked as a doctor in several concentration and labor camps, first in Wildau and then beginning in December 1942, in and around Oranienburg, at Sachsenhausen concentration camp and satellite camps.

She and her assistant made friends and sought to aid Jews and others persecuted by the Third Reich. She organized resistance groups among the Soviet forced laborers and worked to supply them with food and information. One friend connected her with French and Belgian prisoners and in 1943, she met Georg Groscurth, a doctor whose patients included Rudolf Hess and who was one of the founders of the German resistance group, the European Union. Groscurth gave her medicines and advice and supported her organizing efforts. She became a member of the European Union. In September, as the European Union was attempting to make contact with the Allies, Groscurth and other key members of the group were arrested.

Romanova and her friends pressed on with their work and prepared a message to send to the Allies. They were just about to send their message to Sweden when they were discovered and arrested. One friend, Alexei Kalinitchenko, died under interrogation. Romanova was arrested on October 6, 1943 and sentenced to death on April 27, 1944. She was guillotined on November 3, 1944 at Berlin-Plötzensee prison.
