= Katharina Szelinski-Singer =

German sculptor

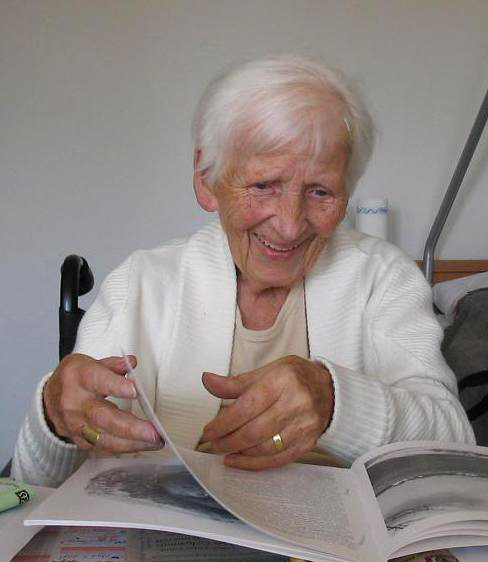
Katharina Szelinski-Singer in September 2007

Katharina Szelinski-Singer, born as Katharina Singer (24 May 1918 in Neusassen, nearby Heydekrug, Memelland – 20 December 2010 in Berlin) was a German sculptor. She lived in Berlin from 1945 until her death.

Katharina Szelinski-Singer was an accomplished sculptor who studied at the Berlin University of the Arts, where she was a master student of Richard Scheibe. Shortly after finishing her studies in the mid-fifties, she was commissioned to do a sculpture for park "Hasenheide" in Berlin. The sculpture was intended to honour the German Trümmerfrauen (German for: rubble women), those women who after the end of the Second World War played a major role in rebuilding the city by clearing up the rubble of the damaged buildings. This limestone-sculpture is until now her most well-known work in a public place. After several similar but smaller commissions she lived from 1956 till 1986 mainly from doing restoring work at the Charlottenburg Palace.

Katharina Szelinski-Singer was considered an outsider in the art scene: Although following up a different career path she continued to sculpture, but till 1987 her work could only rarely be seen in exhibitions. This changed in 1987–88, when the Georg-Kolbe-Museum showed her work in a large exhibition dedicated only to her. All in all 45 of her sculptures have been shown there.

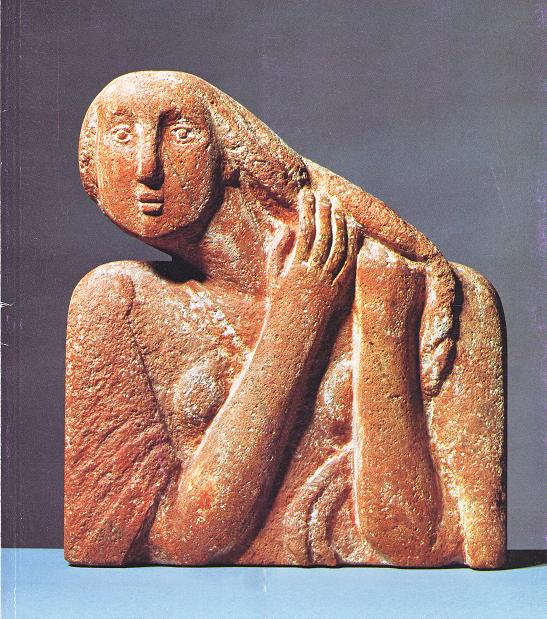
Sculpture „Porphyr“, 1988

Her work consists roughly of one hundred sculptures which are without exemption figurative. She is practically always showing bodies or heads of women; very often they are an image of herself or influenced by elements from her own life. With the sculpture series Köpfe (German for: Heads) she was able to free herself to some extent from the influence of her teacher Richard Scheibe and develop new ways to express herself. This resulted also in a more extensive usage of bronze and gypsum, after a long period of working with natural stone. Art experts judge her work to be in line with the so-called "Berliner Bildhauerschule" (Berlin sculptor school).

She died on 20 December 2010, at age 92, in Berlin and was buried at the Friedhof Heerstraße.

== References (exhibition catalogues) ==
- Katharina Szelinski-Singer: Bildhauerarbeiten. Mit Texten von Ursel Berger und Helmut Börsch-Supan. Hrsg.: Georg-Kolbe-Museum (Ausstellungskatalog), Berlin 1987, 48 Seiten, 33 Abb.
- Katharina Szelinski-Singer: Stein und Bronze. Mit Texten von Wolfgang Schulz. Eine Veröffentlichung der Stiftung Deutschlandhaus, Berlin. 1997, Katalog zur Ausstellung Deutschlandhaus, 19.10. - 14.12. 1997; Meissen, Albrechtsburg 8.2. - 13.4. 1998. 60 S. mit zahlr. Abb., teils farbig.
