= Endsieg =

Nazi German propaganda term

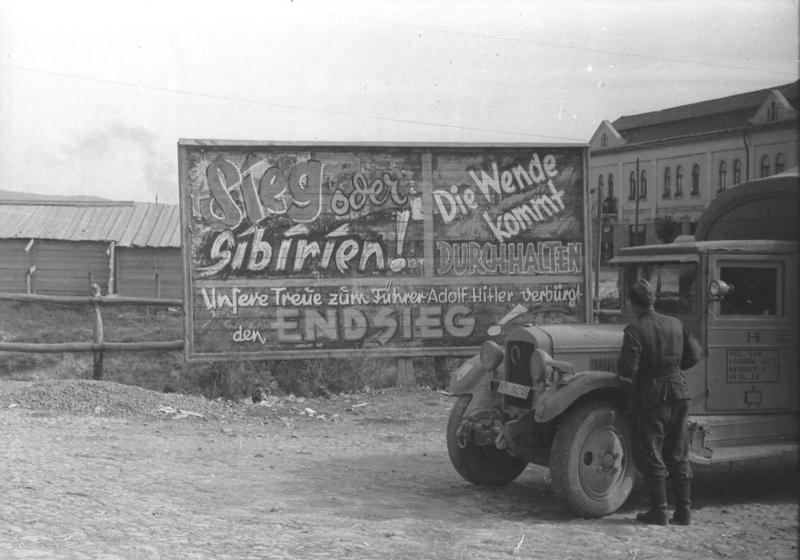
Billboard with Nazi slogans in Northern Transylvania, August 1944.

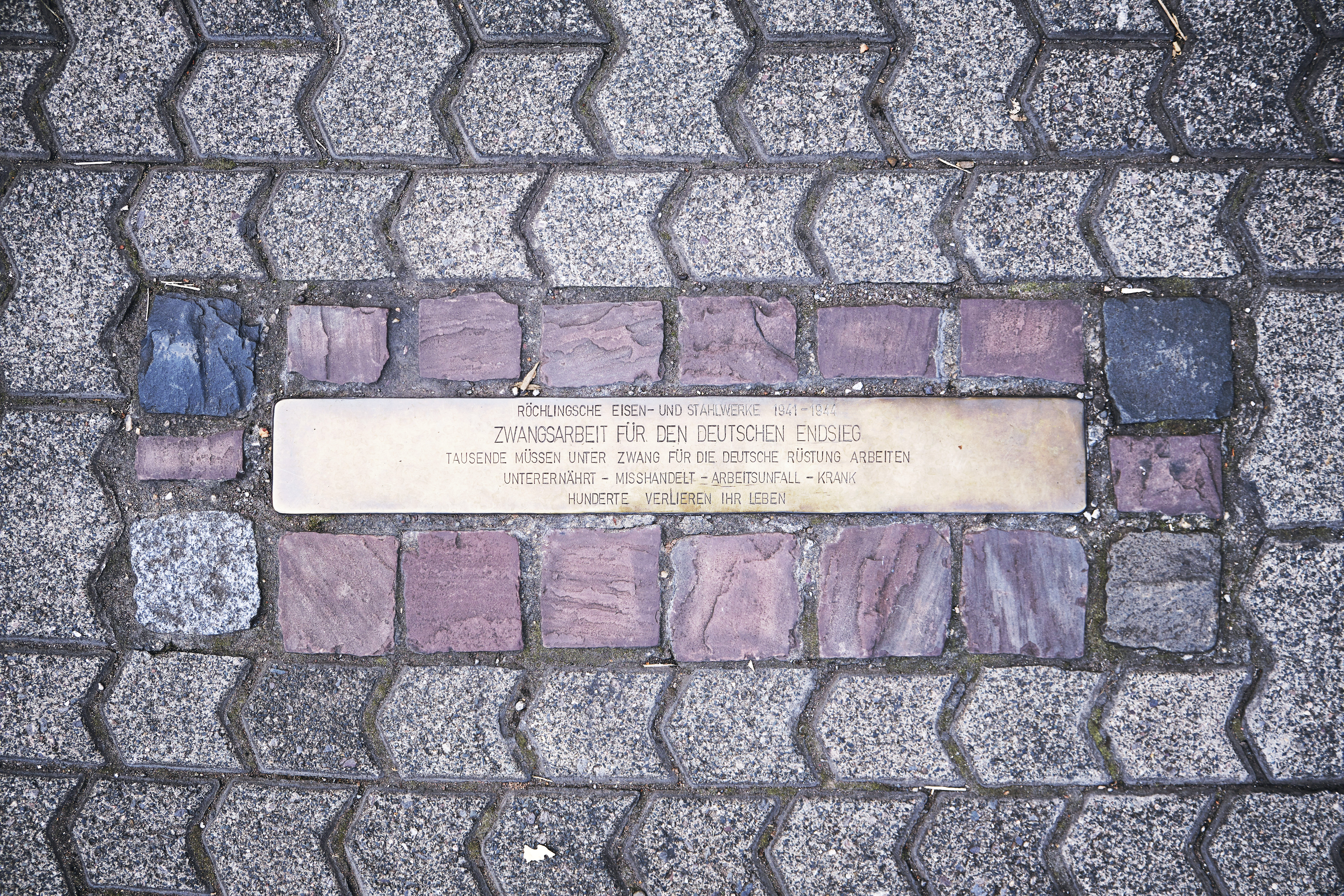
Memorial at the site of Völklingen Ironworks commemorating those who were made to perform "forced labour for the German Endsieg".

Endsieg ([ˈɛntziːk]), German for "final victory", emerged prominently during World War II as a central concept within Nazi ideology.

== Meaning and purpose ==
Coined by Nazi leaders, notably Adolf Hitler, it embodied the notion of an ultimate, decisive triumph for the Nazi regime. Propaganda and rhetoric utilized this term extensively to sustain morale, inspire followers, and maintain the perception of inevitable success despite challenging circumstances and mounting losses.

The concept of endsieg projected an image of an assured, imminent victory to the German population and Nazi supporters. It served as a motivational tool to boost morale, invoking a sense of determination and commitment among soldiers and civilians alike.

Hitler's speeches and propaganda machinery heavily emphasized the idea of endsieg, portraying it as an ideological necessity and an ultimate goal toward which all efforts should be directed. The term was associated with the vision of a future where Nazi Germany emerged as the unparalleled, dominant power, achieving complete control and authority over Europe and possibly beyond.

With the 1938 enactment of Wehrkraftzersetzung (and the 1939 extension of military law to the general populace), any questioning or doubts about endsieg became illegal, considered to be seditious defeatism.

== Nazi decline and final references to Endsieg ==
As the war progressed, the tide turned against the Axis powers. Military defeats, logistical challenges, and the increasing strength of the Allied forces led to a gradual decline in Nazi Germany's position. Despite Hitler's insistence on the concept of endsieg, the economic strain and heavy losses suffered by Germany's military questioned the feasibility of such a conclusive victory.

The Battle of Stalingrad in 1942–43, one of the pivotal turning points, marked a significant setback for the Germans. The subsequent series of defeats, coupled with the Allied Invasion of Normandy in 1944, underscored the vulnerability of the Axis powers.

As the war progressed, the Allied forces gained momentum, slowly but steadily pushing back the Axis powers on multiple fronts.

The war ended with the unconditional surrender of Nazi Germany in May 1945. Joseph Goebbels still spoke about Endsieg as late as April 1945.

== See also ==
- Glossary of Nazi Germany
- Propaganda in World War II
- Final Solution
- Total war
- Wehrkraftzersetzung
