= Teddy Kleindin =

Franz "Teddy" Kleindin (July 20, 1914, Berlin – October 12, 2007, Berlin) was a German jazz clarinetist and alto saxophonist, composer, arranger, and bandleader.

After studying cello and clarinet at the Hochschule für Musik, Berlin, he began performing and recording in 1934 with dance and jazz bands, including those of Teddy Stauffer (1936–7) and Kurt Hohenberger (1938–9).

As a studio musician he recorded with Kutte Widmann (1939–41), Willy Berking (1940–43), and Freddie Brocksieper (1942, 1947), among others.

He also made recordings with his own bands, including a big band.
