= Wehrkraftzersetzung =

German military law during the Nazi era

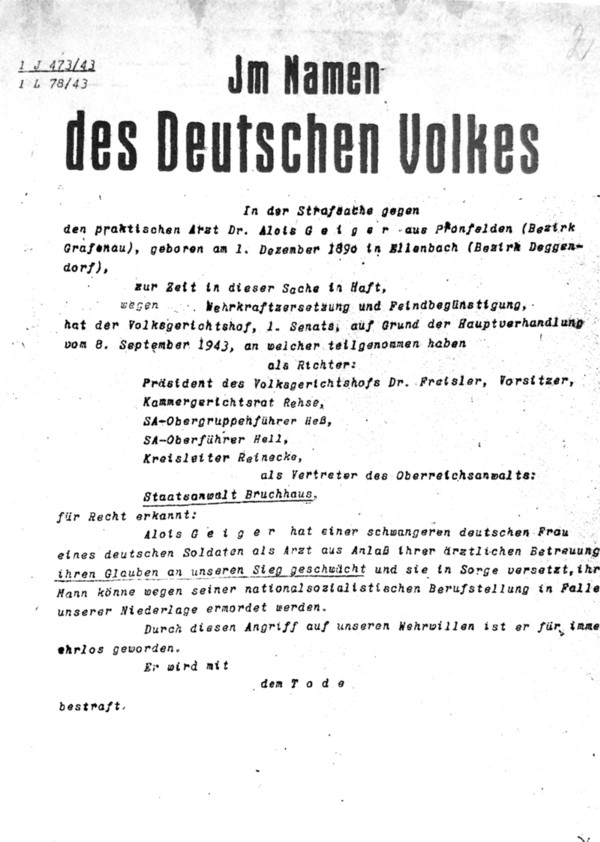
Wehrkraftzersetzung death sentence issued by the People's Court on 8 September 1943 against Dr. Alois Geiger for defeatism

Wehrkraftzersetzung or Zersetzung der Wehrkraft (German for "corroding military strength") was a sedition offence in German military law during the Nazi Germany era from 1938 to 1945.

Wehrkraftzersetzung was enacted in 1938 by decree as Germany moved closer to World War II to suppress criticism of the Nazi Party and Wehrmacht leadership in the military, and in 1939, a second decree was issued extending the law by defining all German people as civilians subject to service discipline. Wehrkraftzersetzung consolidated and redefined paragraphs already in the military penal code to punish "seditious" acts such as conscientious objection, (Note: The law's frequent application to conscientious objectors is now generally believed to a miscarriage of justice, even by Nazi standards. The law, vague and tyrannical as it was, did not prohibit conscientious objection as written.) defeatist statements, self-mutilation, and questioning the Endsieg. Convictions were punishable by the death penalty, heavy sentences in military prisons, concentration camps, or Strafbataillons.

Wehrkraftzersetzung was de facto abolished in 1945 after Nazi Germany's defeat, but text from the penal code continued to be used by the Federal Republic of Germany. On 25 August 1998 and 23 July 2002, after lengthy debate, the Bundestag removed the Nazi-era sentences from the German criminal justice system, and all Nazi military sentencing for conscientious objection, desertion, and all other forms of Wehrkraftzersetzung were repealed as unjust. Current German military law neither contains the term "undermining the military" nor its extensive rules, but a few offences included under the umbrella of Wehrkraftzersetzung remain on the statute books in a vague form.

== Etymology ==
The German phrase Wehrkraftzersetzung can be translated into English in various forms depending on context, and is difficult to translate in its sense used by the Nazi Party. Wehrkraftzersetzung is composed of three parts: Wehr means 'defence' (a cognate of the English word "war"); kraft means power, force, strength; zersetzung means decay, decomposition, disintegration, dissolving (especially by acids), but also subversion or corruption. The context of Wehrkraftzersetzung, or Zersetzung der Wehrkraft, used by the Nazi Party is typically translated into English as "undermining military force" or "subversion of the war effort" (in reference to the forthcoming war effort), "undermining military morale", and "sedition and defeatism".

== Definition in the Nazi military penal code ==
The term Zersetzung der Wehrkraft was established in German military law by the Wartime Special Penal Code (Kriegssonderstrafrechtsverordnung or KSSVO) on 17 August 1938, which criminalized all criticism, dissent and behavior opposed to Nazi political and military leadership, particularly within the Wehrmacht's military justice. The definition of the term is equivalent to the Treachery Act of 1934 but escalates the severity of the crime, with critical remarks by soldiers violating the Treachery Act were previously punished merely with a prison term, but the KSSVO added the death penalty, allowing a Zuchthaus or prison sentence only in minor cases. With the introduction of the Wartime Regulations for Criminal Procedures (Kriegsstrafverfahrensordnung or KStVO), those accused under the law were also deprived of the right to appeal, further weakening them at trial. The extent of the military judge's discretion and the degree of arbitrariness involved are indicated in a 1942 statement by Alfred Fikentscher, an admiral and chief medical officer in the Kriegsmarine. Speaking before military lawyers, he said, "...similar circumstances exist with subversive remarks, which may be seen as violations of the Treachery Act. Protracted submission [of documents] to the Minister of Justice to order a criminal prosecution is unnecessary if you approach the statement as undermining the military, which will be possible in almost every case."

The regulations created by the Wehrmacht in the course of preparing for World War II served during the war years as an instrument of terror to maintain the soldiers' "will to persevere" through coercion. Especially in the later stages of the war, the Nazi and Wehrmacht leadership were greatly afraid of repetition of the events during the German Revolution that occurred after World War I. Every act of resistance was to be suppressed so that a reoccurrence of the "stab-in-the-back" be prevented. At the beginning of 1943, the jurisdiction was transferred to the People's Court (Volksgerichtshof), though minor cases could be sent to the Sondergerichte (special courts) that were originally instituted for political crimes but by this time advanced to be the usual courts against common criminality. The Sondergerichte, not unlike later drumhead courts, prioritized hunting-down, not due process, as their express purpose.

=== Interpretation ===
§5 of the KSSVO reads:

Whoever openly challenges or incites others to refuse to fulfill their duty to serve in the German armed forces or their allies, or otherwise openly tries to self-assertively put up a fight to cripple or subvert the will of the German people or their allies ... will be sentenced to death for undermining the military.

The word "openly" provided room for interpretation by authorities, so that even remarks made within one's own family could be used by relatives against the accused. The vague wording of the regulation made it possible to criminalize every type of criticism, also by civilians, deliberately encouraging denunciation as a means to more comprehensively control the population. That "undermining the war effort" in Nazi Germany was by no means a trivial offense is seen in the 1 November 1944 decree from the head of the National Socialist Secret Service of the Luftwaffe:

"It has long been self-evident that whoever expresses doubt about the Führer, criticizes him and his actions, spreads disparaging news or vilifies him, is without honor and worthy of death. Neither standing nor rank, nor personal circumstances or other grounds can exculpate such a case. In the most difficult, deciding period of the war, whoever expresses doubt about the final victory and thereby causes others to waver, has likewise forfeited his life!"

Among others, examples of subversion given were:

- Remarks in opposition to Nazi ideology
- Doubt about the legitimacy of the struggle for survival imposed on us [...]
- Dissemination of news about battle fatigue and German soldiers deserting
- Doubt about military reports
- Cultivating private contact with prisoners of war
- Disparaging that important weapon in war: German propaganda
- Discussing contingencies in the event of defeat
- The assertion, that Bolshevism "is not so bad or that the democracy of our western neighbors could be contemplated". (Note: These examples were translated from the German Wikipedia. Some of them bear a strong resemblance to a quote from Dr. Günther Vollmer, a Ministerial Director at the Reich Ministry of Justice. He wrote, "No longer tolerable and fundamentally worthy of death are [...] remarks of the following kind: The war is lost; Germany or the Führer picked a fight and senselessly or frivolously started the war and must lose it; the NSDAP should or will relinquish power and, like the Italian model, make way for the understanding of peace; a military dictatorship must be established and will be able to forge peace, one must work slowly in order to bring about the conclusion; an intrusion of bolshevism would not be as bad as the propaganda paints it, and will only harm the leading National Socialists; the English or the Americans will stop bolshevism at the German border; urging by word of mouth or letters to the front to throw down their guns or turn back; the Führer is sick, incompetent, a butcher, etc.")

Defeatist remarks were not prosecuted under military law, but were tried in military-backed "accelerated trials", such as in the case of Norbert Engel, a physiotherapist, after expressing his regret over the failure of the 20 July plot to a nurse, saying "If it had succeeded, the war would have been over in five days and we'd have been able to go home." Engel was sentenced to death but escaped the sentence by fleeing to the Netherlands.

The introduction of the KSSVO marked a new stage in the persecution of the Nazis' political opponents and many thousands of them were killed. According to Wehrmacht criminal statistics, by 30 June 1944 there had been 14,262 convictions for Wehrkraftzersetzung, though German military historian Manfred Messerschmidt says the number of convictions was likely to have been closer to 30,000. The number of convictions and proportion of death sentences steadily increased towards the end of the war as criticism increased and the awaited "final victory" was pushed further and further into the future. The way the regulation was formulated meant that a conviction generally came from a denunciation by associates, though some convictions came from remarks in letters or slogans written on walls. The nature of denunciations meant the potential accuser could hardly be certain that during the course of the investigation, he would not also be denounced. The fact that every soldier was informed about the consequences of uttering banned speech may have inhibited the number of denunciations.

== Use in the Federal Republic of Germany ==
Nazi Germany surrendered after signing their Instrument of Surrender on 8 May 1945, and the state was formally dissolved on May 23, effectively abolishing Wehrkraftzersetzung in its intended use. The Federal Republic of Germany (West Germany), established in 1949 from the occupation zones of the Western Allies, inherited legislation that had been used by Nazi Germany and its predecessors, including Wehrkraftzersetzung. West Germany's military law featured texts and phrases based on Wehrkraftzersetzung during its existence and after the reunification of Germany, and was not replaced until military law reforms in the late 1990s and early 2000s. Former Wehrkraftzersetzung-based laws are currently regulated under §§ 109-109k of the German criminal code titled "Crimes against the Defense of the Country" (Straftaten gegen die Landesverteidigung). Offences such as "Disturbing Propaganda against the Bundeswehr" is § 109d, places penalties on untruthful remarks that "disturb the operations of the Bundeswehr", as well as § 109 StGB. Military conscription in Germany was suspended in 2011 for an indefinite period of time.

== People executed under Wehrkraftzersetzung ==
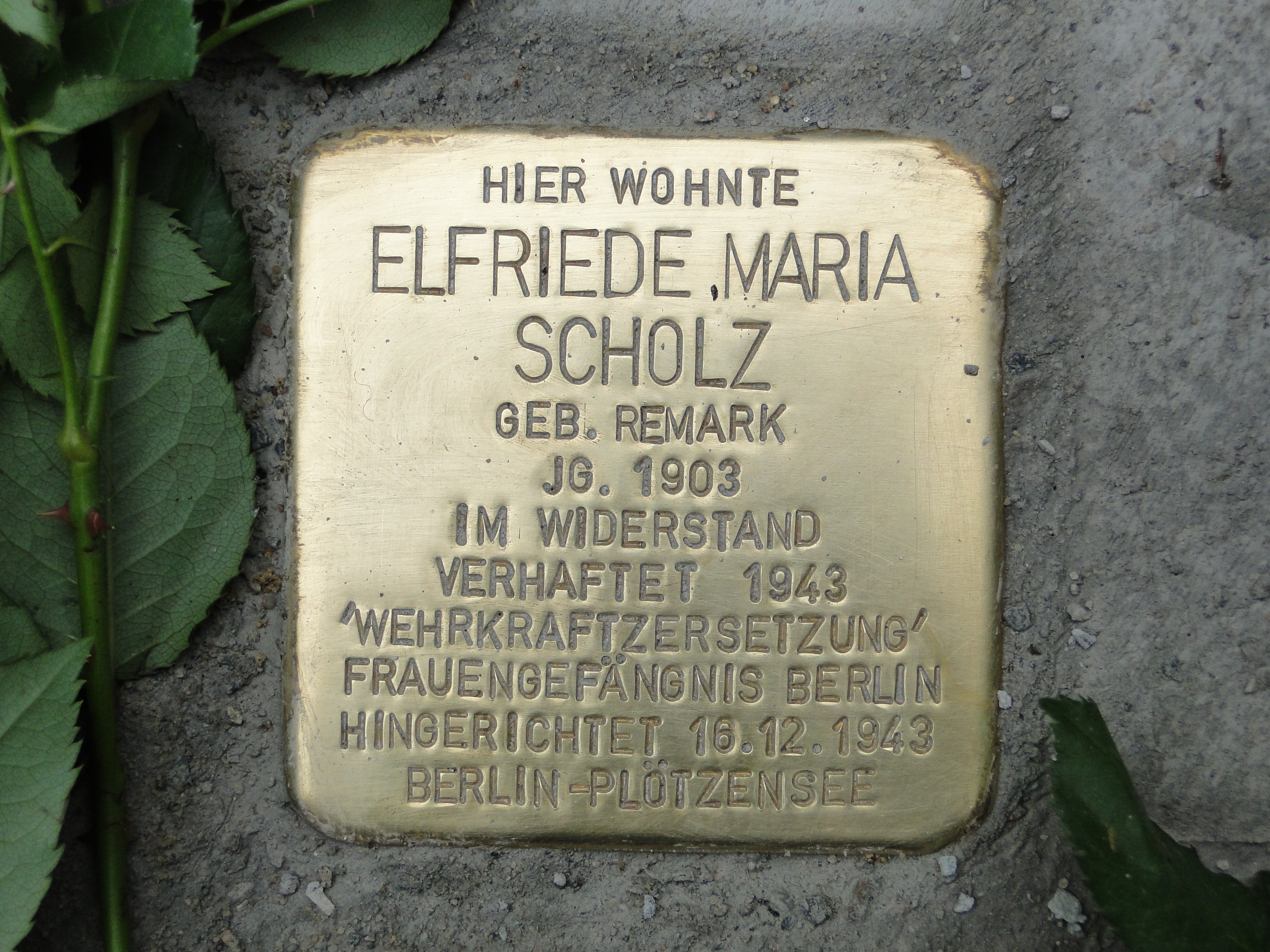
Stolperstein for Elfriede Scholz, executed for Wehrkraftzersetzung in 1943

- Helene Gotthold
- Elise Hampel
- Otto Hampel
- Elli Hatschek
- Franz Jägerstätter
- Erich Knauf
- Theodor Korselt
- Anna Krauss
- Oskar Kusch, commander of U-154
- Lübeck martyrs
- Joseph Müller
- Hans and Sophie Scholl
- Elfriede Scholz, sister of Erich Maria Remarque (author of All Quiet on the Western Front)

== Bibliography ==
- Peter Hoffmann: Der militärische Widerstand in der zweiten Kriegshälfte 1942–1944/45. In: Heinrich Walle (Ed.): Aufstand des Gewissens. Militärischer Widerstand gegen Hitler und das NS-Regime 1933–1945. 4th edition. Mittler, Berlin (1994), ISBN 3-8132-0436-7, pp. 223–248
- Kristian Kossack: Vergessene Opfer, verdrängter Widerstand. herausgegeben vom deutschen Versöhnungsbund, Gruppe Minden.
- Gerhard Paul: Ungehorsame Soldaten. Dissens, Verweigerung und Widerstand deutscher Soldaten (1939–1945). Röhrig Universitäts-Verlag, St. Ingbert (1994), ISBN 3-86110-042-8 (Saarland-Bibliothek 9).
- Norbert Haase, Gerhard Paul (Hrsg.): Die anderen Soldaten. Wehrkraftzersetzung, Gehorsamsverweigerung und Fahnenflucht im Zweiten Weltkrieg. Fischer Taschenbuchverlag GmbH, Frankfurt am Main 1995, ISBN 3-596-12769-6 (Fischer 12769 Geschichte – Die Zeit des Nationalsozialismus).
- Frithjof Päuser: Die Rehabilitierung von Deserteuren der Deutschen Wehrmacht unter historischen, juristischen und politischen Gesichtspunkten mit Kommentierung des Gesetzes zur Aufhebung nationalsozialistischer Unrechtsurteile (NS-AufhG vom 28.05.1998). Universität der Bundeswehr, Munich (2005). Dissertation.
