= Georg Groscurth =

German physician (1904–1944)

Georg Groscurth

Georg Groscurth (German: [ˈɡeː.ɔʁk ˈɡʁɔsˌkʊʁt]; December 27, 1904 – May 8, 1944), was a German medical doctor and member of the resistance to Nazism in the time of the Third Reich.

== Life ==
Georg Groscurth was born a farmer's son in the village of Unterhaun in the Province of Hesse-Nassau, now part of Hauneck in the Bundesland of Hesse. He studied medicine at the University of Marburg, the Albert Ludwigs University of Freiburg, the University of Graz, and the University of Vienna. He finished his studies in Berlin with a doctorate in medicine. Thereafter, Groscurth worked at the Kaiser Wilhelm Institute for Physical Chemistry. There he got to know Robert Havemann, with whom he founded a resistance group some years later.

From 1933 Groscurth worked as an internist at the Robert Koch Hospital in Berlin, and later at the Moabit Hospital, also in Berlin. In 1940, Groscurth was appointed as a lecturer at Friedrich Wilhelm University, where he came to Rudolf Hess's attention when he became Groscurth's patient.

Since Groscurth witnessed not only his Jewish colleagues being removed from their positions when Hitler came to power beginning in 1933, he knowingly broke his professional discretion and tried to communicate to resistance groups everything that Hess had told him during medical consultations. This included, for example, plans for new concentration camps and for an attack on the Soviet Union. Together with the chemist Robert Havemann, the architect Herbert Richter-Lukian and the dentist Paul Rentsch, Groscurth then founded the resistance group Europäische Union ("European Union"). They hid Jews and fugitives. Whenever he could, Groscurth certified soldiers unfit for combat duty. In 1943, he got to know Galina Romanova, a Soviet doctor from Dnepropetrovsk who had been forcibly brought to Germany as a slave labourer. He treated her with medications, gave her professional advice, and supported her in organizing the resistance.

The European Union resistance group was betrayed in 1943 and Groscurth was seized on September 4, 1943. Afterwards, he was sentenced to death at the Volksgerichtshof. The death sentence was signed by judges, Roland Freisler and Hans-Joachim Rehse. Groscurth was hanged at the Brandenburg-Görden Prison on May 8, 1944.

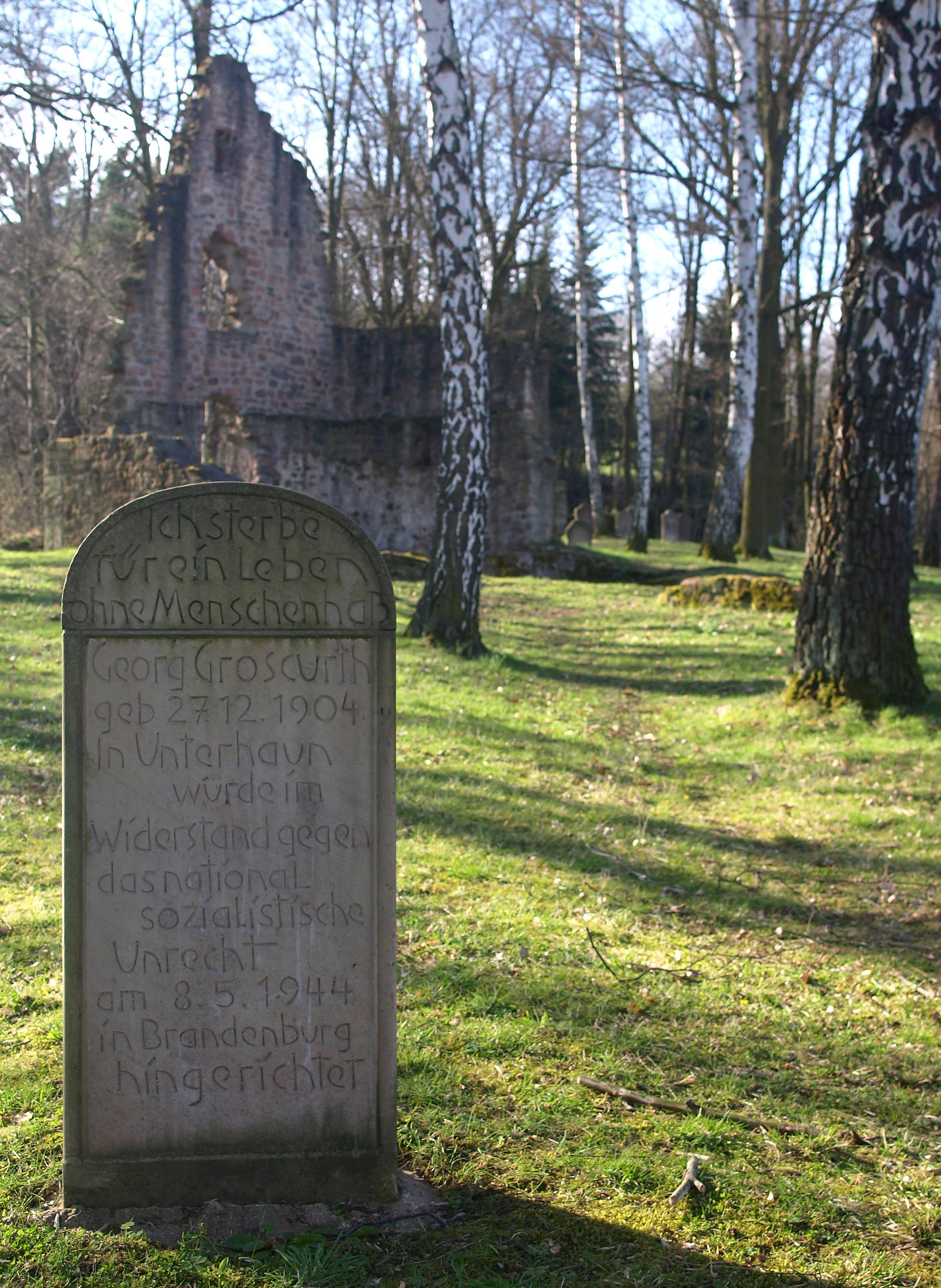
Memorial stone for Georg Groscurth at Unterhaun cemetery

== Posthumous recognition ==
After the war ended, his widow, Anneliese Groscurth, lived in Wehrda in Hesse, and later in West Berlin together with the couple's two sons. Friedrich Christian Delius, who later became a writer, grew up with the two Groscurth boys and later wrote the book Mein Jahr als Mörder ("My Year as a Murderer"), a novel with both autobiographical and historical elements, based on the lives of Georg and Anneliese Groscurth. His book played a major role in bringing recognition to the Groscurth's story.

A memorial plaque that recalls Georg Groscurth's activities can be found at the former Moabit Hospital, Turmstraße 21 in Berlin. Furthermore, a street in the Pankow section of Berlin was named Groscurthstraße in his honour on August 31, 1977. In 1980 a memorial to Groscurth with the inscription "I die for a world without hate" was erected within the cemetery of Unterhaun. In 2005, Israel awarded Groscurth with the designation, Righteous among the Nations.

== Literature ==
- Friedrich C. Delius: Mein Jahr als Mörder. Rowohlt, Berlin 1999 ISBN 3-87134-458-3
