= List of members of the 20 July plot =

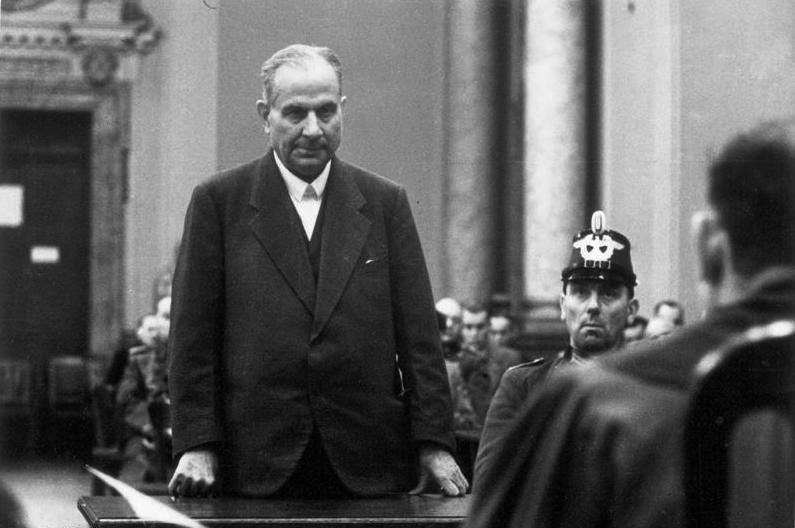
Carl Wentzel appearing before Judge Roland Freisler at the People's Court, 1944

On 20 July 1944, Adolf Hitler and his top military associates entered the briefing hut of the Wolf's Lair military headquarters, a series of concrete bunkers and shelters located deep in the forest of East Prussia, not far from the location of the World War I Battle of Tannenberg. Soon after, an explosion killed three officers and a stenographer, injuring everyone else in the room. This assassination attempt was the work of Colonel Claus von Stauffenberg, an aristocrat who had been severely wounded while serving in the North African theater of war, losing his right hand, left eye, and two fingers of his left hand.

The bomb plot was a carefully planned coup d'état attempt against the Nazi regime, orchestrated by a group of army officers. Their plan was to assassinate Hitler, seize power in Berlin, establish a new pro-Western government and save Germany from total defeat.

Immediately after the arrest and execution of the plot leaders in Berlin by Friedrich Fromm, the Gestapo (the secret police force of Nazi Germany) began arresting people involved or suspected of being involved. This opportunity was also used to eliminate other, unrelated critics of the Nazi regime. In total, an estimated 7,000 people were arrested of which approximately 4,980 were executed, some slowly strangled with piano wire on Hitler's insistence. A month after the failed attempt on Hitler's life, the Gestapo initiated Aktion Gitter.

| Portrait | Name | Position | Fate | Year of death |
|---|---|---|---|---|
| | Otto Armster | Colonel | Survived | 1957 |
| | Ludwig Beck | Former General and Chief of the General Staff of the German Army High Command | Executed (Shot) | 1944 |
| | Robert Bernardis | Lieutenant Colonel | Executed (Hanging) | 1944 |
| | Albrecht Graf von Bernstorff | Diplomat | Executed (Firing squad) | 1945 |
| | Gottfried Graf von Bismarck-Schönhausen | Member of the Reichstag | Survived | 1949 |
| | Hans-Jürgen von Blumenthal | Major | Executed (Hanging) | 1944 |
| | Hasso von Boehmer | Lieutenant Colonel | Executed (Hanging) | 1945 |
| | Georg von Boeselager | Colonel | Killed in action | 1944 |
| | Philipp von Boeselager | Lieutenant Colonel | Survived | 2008 |
| | Eugen Bolz | Member of the Reichstag | Executed (Guillotine) | 1945 |
| | Dietrich Bonhoeffer | Theologian | Executed (Hanging) | 1945 |
| | Klaus Bonhoeffer | Lawyer | Executed (Shot) | 1945 |
| | Eduard Brücklmeier | Diplomat | Executed (Hanging) | 1944 |
| | Axel von dem Bussche | Major | Survived | 1993 |
| | Wilhelm Canaris | Admiral and Head of the Abwehr | Executed (Hanging) | 1945 |
| | Walter Cramer | Businessman | Executed (Hanging) | 1944 |
| | Gustav Dahrendorf | Member of the Reichstag | Survived | 1954 |
| | Alfred Delp | Priest | Executed (Hanging) | 1945 |
| | Heinrich zu Dohna-Schlobitten | General | Executed (Hanging) | 1944 |
| | Hans von Dohnanyi | Lawyer | Executed (Hanging) | 1945 |
| | Fritz Elsas | Deputy Mayor of Berlin | Executed (Hanging) | 1945 |
| | Joseph Ersing | Member of the Reichstag | Survived | 1956 |
| | Alexander von Falkenhausen | General | Survived | 1966 |
| | Erich Fellgiebel | General | Executed (Hanging) | 1944 |
| | Eberhard Finckh | Colonel | Executed (Hanging) | 1944 |
| | Reinhold Frank | Lawyer | Executed (Hanging) | 1945 |
| | Wessel Freytag von Loringhoven | Colonel | Executed (Hanging) | 1944 |
| | Friedrich Fromm | General and Commander of the Replacement Army | Executed (Firing squad) | 1945 |
| | Joseph-Ernst Graf Fugger von Glött | Member of the Reichstag | Survived | 1981 |
| | Ludwig Gehre | Captain | Executed (Hanging) | 1945 |
| | Otto Gerig | Member of the Reichstag | Executed (Concentration camp) | 1944 |
| | Rudolf-Christoph von Gersdorff | General | Survived | 1980 |
| | Eugen Gerstenmaier | Theologian | Survived | 1986 |
| | Otto Gessler | Minister of Defence | Survived | 1955 |
| | Hans Bernd Gisevius | Diplomat | Survived | 1974 |
| | Eric Gloeden | Architect | Executed (Guillotine) | 1944 |
| | Elizabeth Gloeden | Teacher | Executed (Guillotine) | 1944 |
| | Carl Friedrich Goerdeler | Mayor of Leipzig | Executed (Hanging) | 1945 |
| | Fritz Goerdeler | Mayor of Kwidzyn | Executed (Hanging) | 1945 |
| | Gereon Goldmann | Priest | Survived | 2003 |
| | Nikolaus Gross | Journalist | Executed (Hanging) | 1945 |
| | Karl Ludwig Freiherr von und zu Guttenberg | Colonel and journalist | Executed (Hanging) | 1945 |
| | Hans Bernd von Haeften | Lawyer | Executed (Hanging) | 1945 |
| | Werner von Haeften | Lieutenant | Executed (Firing squad) | 1944 |
| | Albrecht von Hagen | Lawyer | Executed (Hanging) | 1944 |
| | Nikolaus von Halem | Lawyer | Executed (Guillotine) | 1944 |
| | Eduard Hamm | Minister of the Economy | Suicide | 1944 |
| | Georg Hansen | Colonel | Executed (Hanging) | 1944 |
| | Carl-Hans von Hardenberg | Major | Survived | 1958 |
| | Ernst von Harnack | Member of the Reichstag | Executed (Hanging) | 1945 |
| | Paul von Hase | General | Executed (Hanging) | 1944 |
| | Ulrich von Hassell | Ambassador of Germany to Italy | Executed (Hanging) | 1944 |
| | Theodor Haubach | Member of the Reichstag | Executed (Hanging) | 1945 |
| | Albrecht Haushofer | Diplomat | Executed (Hanging) | 1945 |
| | Egbert Hayessen | Major | Executed (Hanging) | 1944 |
| | Wolf-Heinrich Graf von Helldorff | Member of the Reichstag and Chief of the Berlin Police | Executed (Hanging) | 1944 |
| | Otto Herfurth | General | Executed (Hanging) | 1944 |
| | Andreas Hermes | Minister of Finance | Survived | 1964 |
| | Erich Hoepner | General | Executed (Hanging) | 1944 |
| | Caesar von Hofacker | Lieutenant Colonel | Executed (Hanging) | 1944 |
| | Roland von Hößlin | Major | Executed (Hanging) | 1944 |
| | Friedrich Gustav Jaeger | Colonel | Executed (Hanging) | 1944 |
| | Hans John | Lawyer | Executed (Firing squad) | 1944 |
| | Otto John | Lawyer | Survived | 1997 |
| | Jakob Kaiser | Lawyer | Survived | 1961 |
| | Otto Kiep | Diplomat | Executed (Hanging) | 1944 |
| | Hans Georg Klamroth | Major | Executed (Hanging) | 1944 |
| | Friedrich Klausing | Captain | Executed (Hanging) | 1944 |
| | Ewald von Kleist-Schmenzin | Diplomat | Executed (Hanging) | 1945 |
| | Ewald-Heinrich von Kleist-Schmenzin | Lieutenant | Survived | 2013 |
| | Günther von Kluge | Field Marshal | Suicide | 1944 |
| | Hans Koch | Lawyer | Executed (Hanging) | 1945 |
| | Alfred Kranzfelder | Lieutenant Commander | Executed (Hanging) | 1944 |
| | Carl Langbehn | Lawyer | Executed (Hanging) | 1944 |
| | Julius Leber | Member of the Reichstag | Executed (Hanging) | 1945 |
| | Heinrich Graf von Lehndorff-Steinort | Landowner | Executed (Hanging) | 1944 |
| | Paul Lejeune-Jung | Member of the Reichstag | Executed (Hanging) | 1945 |
| | Ludwig Freiherr von Leonrod | Major | Executed (Hanging) | 1944 |
| | Bernhard Letterhaus | Trade Unionist | Executed (Hanging) | 1944 |
| | Franz Leuninger | Trade Unionist | Executed (Hanging) | 1945 |
| | Wilhelm Leuschner | Member of the Reichstag | Executed (Hanging) | 1944 |
| | Fritz Lindemann | General | Died of injuries in custody | 1944 |
| | Hans Otfried von Linstow | Colonel | Executed (Hanging) | 1944 |
| | Paul Löbe | Member of the Reichstag | Survived | 1967 |
| | Ewald Loeser | Lawyer | Survived | 1970 |
| | Ferdinand von Lüninck | Member of the Reichstag | Executed (Hanging) | 1944 |
| | Hermann Maaß | Lawyer | Executed (Hanging) | 1944 |
| | Rudolf von Marogna-Redwitz | Colonel | Executed (Hanging) | 1944 |
| | Michael von Matuschka | Member of the Landtag of Prussia | Executed (Hanging) | 1944 |
| | Joachim Meichßner | Colonel | Executed (Hanging) | 1944 |
| | Albrecht Mertz von Quirnheim | Colonel | Executed (Firing squad) | 1944 |
| | Joseph Müller | Priest | Executed (Guillotine) | 1944 |
| | Arthur Nebe | General and Chief of Kriminalpolizei | Executed (Hanging) | 1945 |
| | Hans-Ulrich von Oertzen | Major | Suicide | 1944 |
| | Friedrich Olbricht | General | Executed (Firing squad) | 1944 |
| | Hans Oster | General | Executed (Hanging) | 1945 |
| | Margarethe von Oven | Secretary | Survived | 1991 |
| | Rolf Friedemann Pauls | Major | Survived | 2002 |
| | Erwin Planck | Diplomat | Executed (Hanging) | 1945 |
| | Kurt von Plettenberg | Landowner | Suicide | 1945 |
| | Johannes Popitz | Minister of Finance of Prussia | Executed (Hanging) | 1945 |
| | Erwin Rommel | Field Marshal | Suicide (Forced) | 1944 |
| | Friedrich von Rabenau | General | Executed (Hanging) | 1945 |
| | Adolf Reichwein | Economist | Executed (Hanging) | 1944 |
| | Alexis von Roenne | Colonel | Executed (Hanging) | 1944 |
| | Karl Sack | General | Executed (Hanging) | 1945 |
| | Joachim Sadrozinski | Lieutenant Colonel | Executed (Hanging) | 1944 |
| | Anton Saefkow | Lawyer | Executed (Guillotine) | 1944 |
| | Fabian von Schlabrendorff | General | Survived | 1980 |
| | Rüdiger Schleicher | Lawyer | Executed (Hanging) | 1945 |
| | Ernst Schneppenhorst | Ministers of War of Bavaria | Executed (Hanging) | 1945 |
| | Werner Schrader | Lieutenant Colonel | Suicide | 1944 |
| | Friedrich-Werner Graf von der Schulenburg | Ambassador of Germany to the Soviet Union | Executed (Hanging) | 1944 |
| | Fritz-Dietlof von der Schulenburg | Oberpräsident of the Province of Silesia | Executed (Hanging) | 1944 |
| | Ludwig Schwamb | Civil Servant | Executed (Hanging) | 1945 |
| | Ulrich Wilhelm Graf Schwerin von Schwanenfeld | Major | Executed (Hanging) | 1944 |
| | Günther Smend | Lieutenant Colonel | Executed (Hanging) | 1944 |
| | Hans Speidel | General | Survived | 1984 |
| | Franz Sperr | Major | Executed (Hanging) | 1945 |
| | Berthold Schenk Graf von Stauffenberg | Judge | Executed (Hanging) | 1944 |
| | Claus von Stauffenberg | Leader of the plot and Colonel | Executed (Firing squad) | 1944 |
| | Hellmuth Stieff | General | Executed (Hanging) | 1944 |
| | Theodor Strünck | Lawyer | Executed (Hanging) | 1945 |
| | Carl-Heinrich von Stülpnagel | General | Executed (Hanging) | 1944 |
| | Carl Szokoll | Major | Survived | 2004 |
| | Fritz Thiele | General | Executed (Hanging) | 1944 |
| | Busso Thoma | Major | Executed (Hanging) | 1945 |
| | Georg Thomas | General | Survived | 1946 |
| | Karl Freiherr von Thüngen | General | Executed (Firing squad) | 1944 |
| | Henning von Tresckow | General | Suicide | 1944 |
| | Adam von Trott zu Solz | Diplomat | Executed (Firing squad) | 1944 |
| | Nikolaus von Üxküll-Gyllenband | Colonel | Executed (Hanging) | 1944 |
| | Eduard Wagner | General | Suicide | 1944 |
| | Hermann Josef Wehrle | Priest | Executed (Hanging) | 1944 |
| | Carl Wentzel | Landowner | Executed (Hanging) | 1944 |
| | Joachim von Willisen | Diplomat | Survived | 1983 |
| | Josef Wirmer | Lawyer | Executed (Hanging) | 1944 |
| | Erwin von Witzleben | Field Marshal | Executed (Hanging) | 1944 |
| | Peter Yorck von Wartenburg | Lawyer | Executed (Hanging) | 1944 |
| | Gustav Heistermann von Ziehlberg | General | Executed (Firing squad) | 1945 |

== See also ==
- List of people killed or wounded in the 20 July plot

== Sources ==
- How Hitler's Bodyguard Worked. World Media Rights. Archived from the original on 1 May 2015.
- Shirer, William Lawrence (1960). The Rise and Fall of the Third Reich: A History of Nazi Germany. New York City: Simon & Schuster. ASIN B0766DKDLR. LCCN 60006729. OCLC 1286630. OL 5794925M. Wikidata Q138029595.
- The Fatal Attraction of Adolf Hitler. British Broadcasting Corporation. 1988. ASIN B004TXS790.

== General references ==
- Hoffmann, Peter (1996). History of the German Resistance, 1933–1945. Kingston, Ontario: McGill-Queen's Press. ISBN 9780773566408.
