= Armster =

Armster is a surname. Among all countries/territories, the United States has the most people bearing the name Armster. One in 14,902,957 people worldwide carries the family name Armster, which is the 626,382nd most common family name overall. Notable people with the surname include:

- Otto Armster (1891–1957), German military intelligence officer
- Wilfred Armster, American architect
