= Gerd Wenzinger =

Suspected German serial killer

- Born: June 1943; Sankt Blasien, Germany
- Died: 16 June 1997 (aged 53–54); Salvador, Bahia, Brazil
- Cause of death: Suicide by hanging
- Other name: "The Havel Ripper"
- Conviction: N/A
- Penalty: N/A

Details
- Victims: 2–17+ (not confirmed, died before trial)
- Span of crimes: 1991–1996
- Country: Germany, Brazil
- States: Berlin, Bahia
- Date apprehended: 1997

Gerd Wenzinger (1943 – 16 June 1997), known as The Havel Ripper, was a German doctor and suspected serial killer, thought to have killed between 2 and at least 17 women in Germany and Brazil between 1991 and 1996. He committed suicide shortly after his extradition to his home country was approved.

== Life ==
Gerd Wenzinger was born in Sankt Blasien in 1943 (or, according to other sources, 1941 or 1942), the second of three children. From an early age, he had an affinity for music and art, playing the violin, as well as having a keen interest in painting and modelling.

After graduating from high school, Wenzinger began studying mathematics and physics, but later switched to medicine. After four years of being together, he and his wife separated, and from then on, he had only temporary relationships with various women.

In 1978, Gerd settled as a general practitioner in Stuttgart. In 1990, one of his partners accidentally discovered secretly filmed video footage of Wenzinger torturing his patients during treatment. The tape was sent to the authorities and the medical association, which forced him to forfeit his medical license. Wenzinger ended his practice and moved to Berlin the following year. His neighbours described him as a nice and polite man, who had many lovers. Two of his would-be murder victims were introduced to the neighbours as friends when they were still alive.

Gerd notably often went on vacations to Brazil. At the time of his death, he was imprisoned in the country for a sexual offence. Brazilian media reported that he had tortured around 90 women, mostly prostitutes, killing four of them. In some cases, the deeds were recorded on video. Various lawsuits against Wenzinger, including for rape and sexual abuse of minors, were filed, but the proceedings were dropped in 1993.

After he learned that his extradition was approved by the German authorities for the murder of Dana Franzke, Wenzinger hanged himself in his jail cell in 1997. Two days earlier, he had attempted to overdose on antibiotics. He was buried in Salvador on 21 July.

== Murders ==
Between 25 and 28 June 1994, the remains of 23-year-old Dana Franzke, numbering 42 in total, were found scattered on the northern outskirts of Berlin in the Oder-Havel Canal. At the time, the victim's identity couldn't be established, although the fingerprints of the drug-addicted prostitute were registered in the database. A composite sketch of the woman, presented on Aktenzeichen XY… ungelöst, finally led her mother to positively identifying her in November 1994. Three sedatives and narcotics were found in the body, which are otherwise only used for anaesthesia.

On 5 November 1994, the frozen body parts of a young woman were found on the Bundesautobahn 1, between Hamburg and Lübeck near Bad Oldesloe, among them the head and internal organs. Six days after the discovery, she was identified as 19-year-old Sabrina G., also a prostitute. The investigations into both cases were initially unsuccessful.

Two years later, the Franzke case was resumed when a cassette tape was sent to the Berlin Criminal Police in May 1996. The footage depicted tortures, murders, dismemberments and desecration against various women in Wenzinger's Berlin home, among them being Dana. It is believed that she was unable to defend herself from the anaesthetic but was conscious during the whole process. After injuring her multiple times, Gerd tortured her to death using a chainsaw, abusing the corpse before slicing it up in many parts. He made additional cuts in such a way that many of the injuries previously inflicted were no longer distinguishable.

Shortly after his first suicide attempt, Wenzinger gave the Brazilian media an interview in which he denied killing Franzke, but admitted to dismembering her body. He claimed that she had died from a heroin overdose, but no trace of the narcotic was found in her body.

In his suicide note, Wenzinger denied all of the murders, claiming that he only drugged the women.

Several psychiatric books were written about the case of Gerd Wenzinger, which is considered a breakthrough in aggressive sexual fantasies stemming from the perpetrator's childhood.

== Bibliography ==
- Michael Newton, Jaques Buval (2002): The Encyclopedia of Serial Killers. Graz: Verlag für Collectors
- Dizionario dei serial killer: una panoramica senza precedenti sugli omicidi seriali dall'antica Roma ai giorni nostri. Newton & Compton, 2004 (in Italian)
- The Encyclopedia of Serial Killers. Infobase Publishing, 2006

== See also ==
- List of German serial killers
