= Execution of the Gloeden family =

Event in Nazi Germany (1944)

Elisabeth "Lilo" Charlotte Gloeden (1903–1944) and her husband Erich Gloeden (1888–1944), though not involved in the failed 20 July plot to assassinate Adolf Hitler, sheltered General Fritz Lindemann, one of the plotters. They were eventually betrayed to the Gestapo, tried and, along with her mother Elisabeth Kuznitzky (1878–1944), executed by guillotine on 30 November 1944; their fate was publicized as a warning.

== Biography ==
"Lilo" Gloeden (born Elisabeth Kuznitsky) was a lawyer who married architect Erich Gloeden. Erich was the son of Siegfried Loevy (died 1936), a Jew who had married a Christian. Brothers Siegfried and Albert Loevy established a successful and important bronze foundry, SA Loevy, and became purveyors to the royal court in 1910. Erich and his sister Ursula (1897–1972) were adopted by family friend and high school teacher Bernhard Gloeden in 1918, with the consent of their parents, simply to mask their Jewish background with a non-Jewish surname, and Erich was baptized.

After the start of World War II, Erich Gloeden worked for the Organisation Todt as an architect. Living in Berlin, the Gloedens secretly opposed the Nazi movement and provided temporary accommodation to Jewish people fleeing persecution. In July 1944, the Gloedens became aware of a plot against Hitler, and five days after the failed assassination attempt, took in General Fritz Lindemann, who was hiding from the manhunt for the plotters. They passed him off as a retired major and journalist named Exner. On 3 September, the Gestapo raided the Gloedens' home, capturing Lindemann and taking Lilo, Erich and Lilo's mother, Elisabeth, into custody. Lindemann was shot in the stomach and leg during the raid, dying of his wounds on 22 September.

On 27 November, the Gloedens and Elisabeth Kuznitsky were brought before the People's Court (Volksgerichtshof) in a widely publicized trial for treason. Erich Gloeden claimed the others had not known who Lindemann was. He was sentenced to death, while the women received long prison sentences. However, his wife stated she had known Lindemann's identity. Her mother then made the same admission. As a result, all three were put to death by beheading three days later on 30 November at Plötzensee Prison.

== Legacy ==
Lilo and Erich Gloeden, and Elisabeth Kuznitzky, are memorialized by three bronze plaques, stolpersteine, installed outside the location of their apartment. President of the Bundestag Norbert Lammert has noted that the national history of each country is the sum of the many, personal stories of people who usually remain unobserved or quickly forgotten like those of the Gloedens, whose story is an example of how in Germany a few generations ago people were excluded from the nation whose self-evident members they were.

The plaques
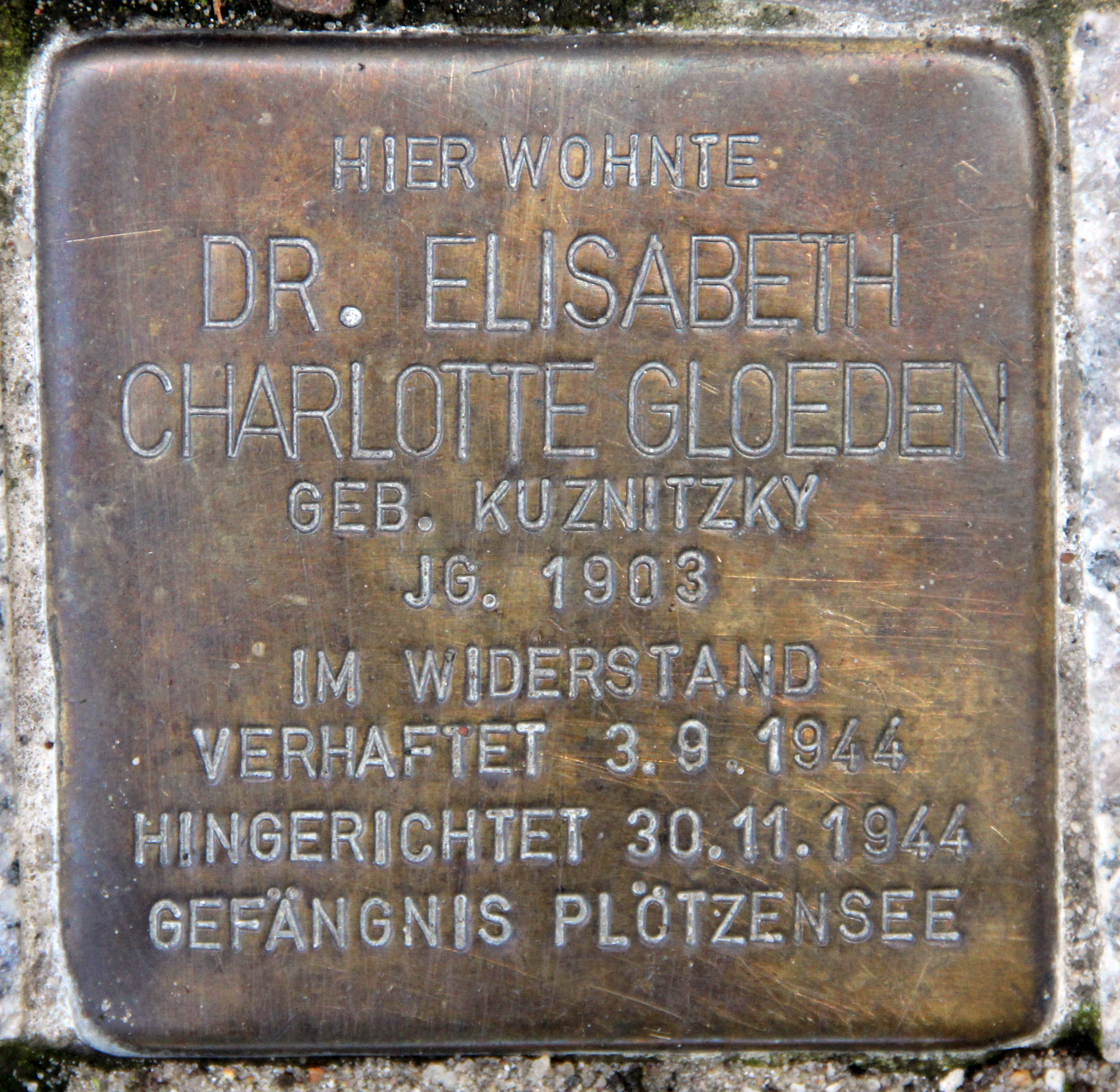

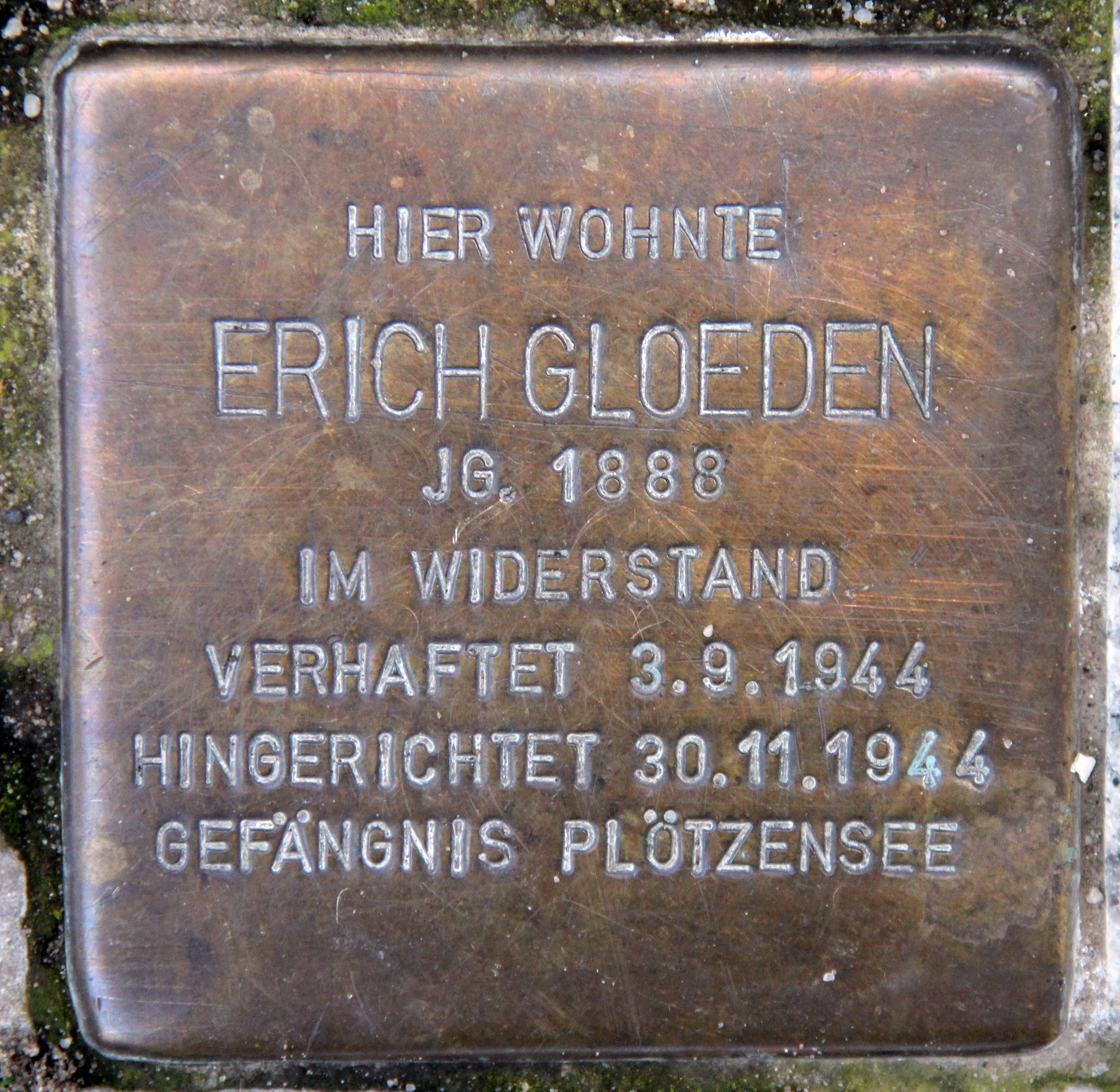

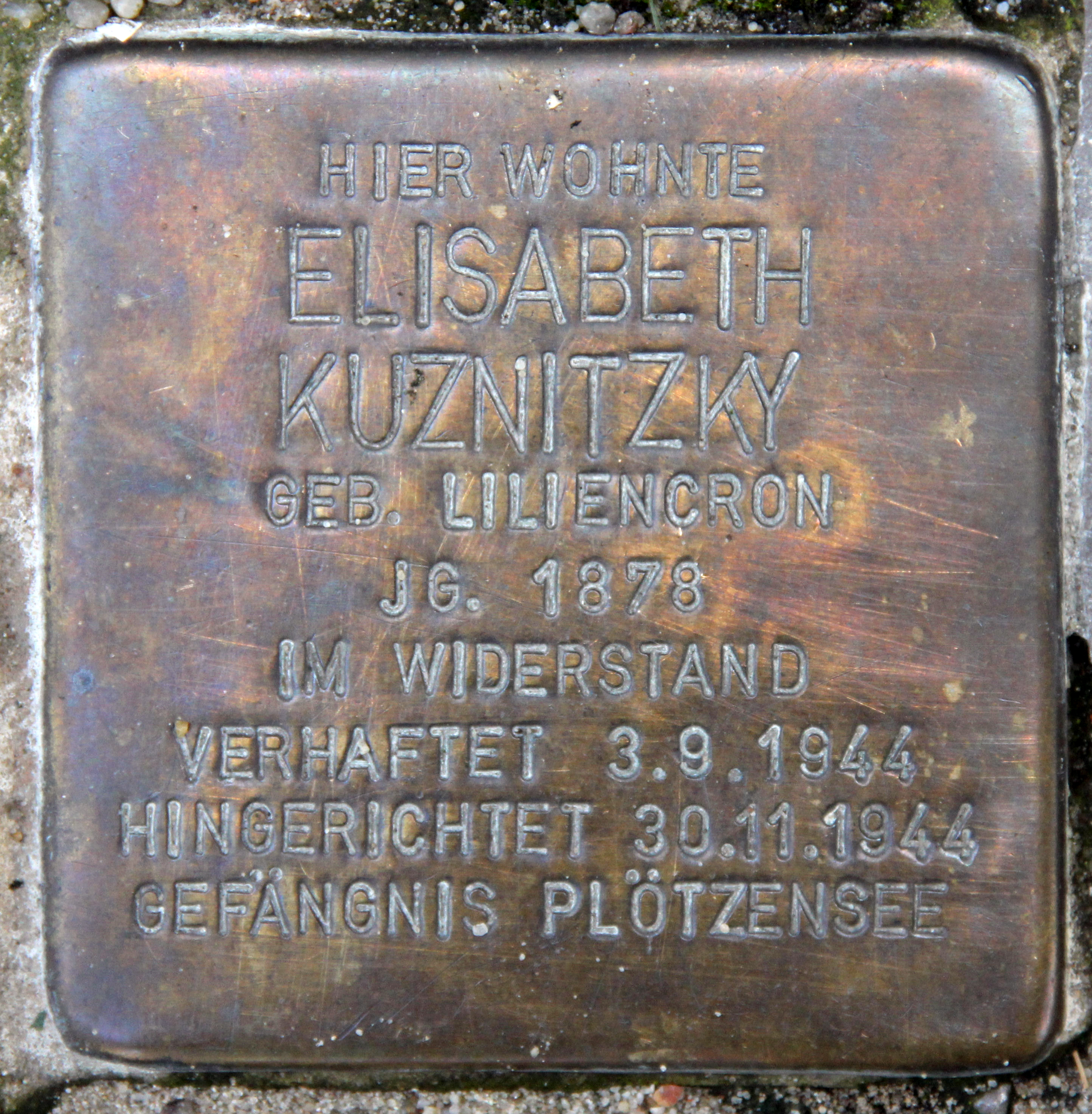
