= Roman Czerniawski =

Polish Air Force Captain and Allied double agent (1910–1985)

Roman Garby-Czerniawski
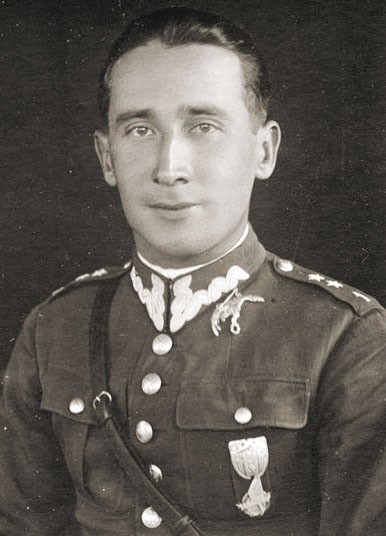
- Born: 6 February 1910
- Died: 26 April 1985 (aged 75); London, United Kingdom
- Espionage activity
- Allegiance: Poland
- Service branch: Polish Air Force
- Codename: Brutus

Roman Garby-Czerniawski (6 February 1910 – 26 April 1985) was a Polish Air Force captain and Allied double agent during World War II who used the code name Brutus.

== Early life ==
Czerniawski graduated in the late 1930s from the Wyższa Szkoła Wojenna (WSWoj), a military academy at Warsaw in Poland.

== World War II ==
As a former officer of the Polish Air Force, he volunteered to create an Allied espionage network in France in 1940. He set it up with Mathilde Carré who recruited the agents since some French declined to work for a Pole. The network was codenamed Interallie.

Czerniawski was evacuated to Britain to be examined by Polish intelligence, and met General Władysław Sikorski and was presented with the Virtuti Militari. He was returned to France by parachute in November 1941.

On 17 November 1941, the Abwehr group of Hugo Bleicher arrested Czerniawski and then Carré. The network had been uncovered because of the lack of proper operational security within the organisation, and many other members of the Interallie were picked up after Carré had agreed to co-operate with the Germans in return for her life. Czerniawski and others were imprisoned.

He was sent to England as an agent after the Germans offered him safety, but he revealed himself to the British authorities. He was debriefed by the British MI6 and Polish authorities about the security lapses of his organisation in France. He was then employed as a double agent by MI5 and was given the codename "Brutus" (after Marcus Junius Brutus the Younger, Julius Caesar's friend and assassin) under their Double Cross System.

His strong anti-Soviet attitude, manifested in his denouncing in a pamphlet that he authored of a Polish officer who attended an official reception at the Soviet embassy, led to doubts about his suitability. For that act of mutiny against the Polish authorities, he was arrested and imprisoned. MI5 produced a cover story that he had been detained in a sweep of "anti-Bolshevik" Poles.

A Polish court-martial found him guilty of gross insubordination, but to keep the matter quiet, it sentenced him to only two months imprisonment. After his release from prison, Czerniawski was unrepentant to his handlers.

MI5 doubted his reliability and thought him to be fickle and liable to meddle, and MI5 also harboured concerns that the Germans would be suspicious about his arrest and swift release. He was no longer permitted to operate the radio himself, and he was used only for the distribution of low-grade information ("chicken feed").

Initial German suspicions faded, and in December 1943, the British decided to use Brutus for distribution of important deception information.

Therefore, he played a major part in the Allied deception prior to the D-Day (6 June 1944) landings in Normandy as one of the primary agents passing false information as part of Fortitude South, the deception plan aimed at convincing Germany that the Allies would invade Europe in the Pas-de-Calais area across the English Channel from southeast England.

Hitler steadfastly believed that 'Brutus' was one of his own men. Brutus reported huge troop movements on the English coast opposite Calais after the invasion had begun. Three days after D-Day, Colonel Alexis von Roenne, an intelligence officer (department Fremde Heere West), reported from Paris: ‘It would therefore be suicidal madness to deploy our infantry and tanks from the Pas de Calais and Belgium at this very moment in order to strengthen the front in Normandy.’ Hitler shared this assessment and categorically forbade sending reinforcements from the Channel coast.

== Postwar ==
After the war, he stayed in the United Kingdom and wrote The Big Network, which was published in 1961.

Czerniawski died in London on 26 April 1985 at the age of 75. He was buried in Newark-on-Trent in the area of Newark Cemetery for RAF burials.

== Sources ==
- Andrzej Pepłoński, Wywiad Polskich Sił Zbrojnych na Zachodzie, 1939–1945 (Polish Armed Forces Intelligence in the West, 1939–1945), Warsaw, 1995.
- Stanisław Żochowski, Wywiad polski we Francji 1940–1945 (Polish Intelligence in France, 1940–1945), Lublin, 1994, ISBN 8390234858.
- John Cecil Masterman, The Double-Cross System in the War of 1939–1945, Yale University Press, 1972.
- Macintyre, Ben (2013). Double Cross: The True Story of the D-Day Spies. Broadway Books. ISBN 978-0307888778.
- Garby-Czerniawski, Roman (1961). The Big Network. London: George Ronald.
