= Alfred Buntru =

German academic and member of the Nazi Party (1887–1974)

- Born: 15 January 1887; Sankt Blasien, Grand Duchy of Baden, German Empire
- Died: 23 January 1974 (aged 87); Aachen, West Germany
- Occupations: Academic and SS officer

Alfred Buntru (15 January 1887 – 23 January 1974) was a German academic and member of the Nazi Party. Born in Sankt Blasien in the Waldshut district of the Grand Duchy of Baden, he was educated at the Karlsruhe Institute of Technology. Buntru later became a professor of hydraulic engineering and a deputy Reichsdozentenführer (English: "Reich lecturer leader"). He joined the Nazi Party in 1937 and the Schutzstaffel (SS) in 1938, attaining the SS rank of Oberführer. As part of his SS membership, he was involved in the Spitzeldienste, the network of political informants set up by the Nazi Party's intelligence organization, the Sicherheitsdienst (SD). Buntru survived the Second World War, and died in Aachen in 1974 at the age of 87.
