= 132nd Infantry Division (Wehrmacht) =

- 132. Infanterie-Division
- Active: 1940–45
- Country: Nazi Germany
- Branch: Army
- Type: Infantry
- Size: Division 15,000 Soldiers
- Colors: Red and Yellow
- Engagements: World War II

The 132nd Infantry Division (German: 132. Infanterie-Division) was a German division in World War II. It was formed on 5 October 1940 in Landshut, as part of the 11th Wave of Wehrmacht mobilization, and was destroyed in the Courland Pocket in 1945.

In May 1941 the units of this division participated in the suppression of the Serb uprising in Sanski Most in the Independent State of Croatia, a fascist puppet state created from Yugoslav territory. Following operations in the Balkans, the division participated in Operation Barbarossa as part of Army Group South. The division was held in reserve and did not see combat in the Soviet Union until July 27, 1941, near Koziatyn in Ukraine. The division was then involved in operations south of Kiev along the Dnieper River and later was diverted to the Crimea, where it served on the Isthmus of Perekop, Kerch Peninsula and Sevastopol front. During the Siege of Sevastopol the division captured the Fortress of Maxim Gorky. Subsequently the division was transferred to Army Group North to assault the fortified city of Leningrad due to its experience in assaulting Sevastopol. Before the attack on Leningrad could commence, called Operation Nordlicht, the division became involved in repulsing the Soviet Sinyavino offensive in August 1942. The division then spent most of the year of 1943 defending the environs around the "bottleneck": a thin strip of land located along the southern coast of Lake Ladoga that was crucial to maintaining the Siege of Leningrad. In November 1943, the division was transported by rail to the extreme southern flank of Army Group North. While stationed there it witnessed the Destruction of Army Group Center with the commencement of the Russian summer offensive, called Operation Bagration. The division then became responsible for maintaining the link between Army Group North and what remained of Army Group Center, and to prevent the Russians from outflanking Army Group North from the south. Eventually the division was cut off from the rest of the German army in the Courland Pocket before surrendering to the Russians on 10 May, 1945.

A personal memoir of service in the division was written by Gottlob Herbert Bidermann, in his book:In Deadly Combat: A German Soldier's Memoir of the Eastern Front Biderman was with the division for four years on the Russian Front and served in 132nd Tank Destroyer Battalion as an NCO and later as an officer in the 437th Infantry Regiment. After surrendering, he spent almost three years in Soviet captivity, as a prisoner of war.

== Organization ==
Structure of the division:

- Headquarters
- 132nd Reconnaissance Battalion
- 436th Infantry Regiment
- 437th Infantry Regiment
- 438th Infantry Regiment
- 132nd Engineer Battalion
- 132nd Artillery Regiment
- 132nd Tank Destroyer Battalion
- 132nd Signal Battalion
- 132nd Divisional Supply Group

== Commanding officers ==
- Generalleutnant Rudolf Sintzenich, 5 October 1940 – 11 January 1942
- General der Artillerie Fritz Lindemann, 11 January 1942 – 12 August 1943
- Generalleutnant Herbert Wagner, 12 August 1943 – 8 January 1945
- Generalmajor Rudolf Demme, 8 January – 8 May 1945
