= Alfred Kranzfelder =

German naval officer and a member of the German resistance (1908–1944)

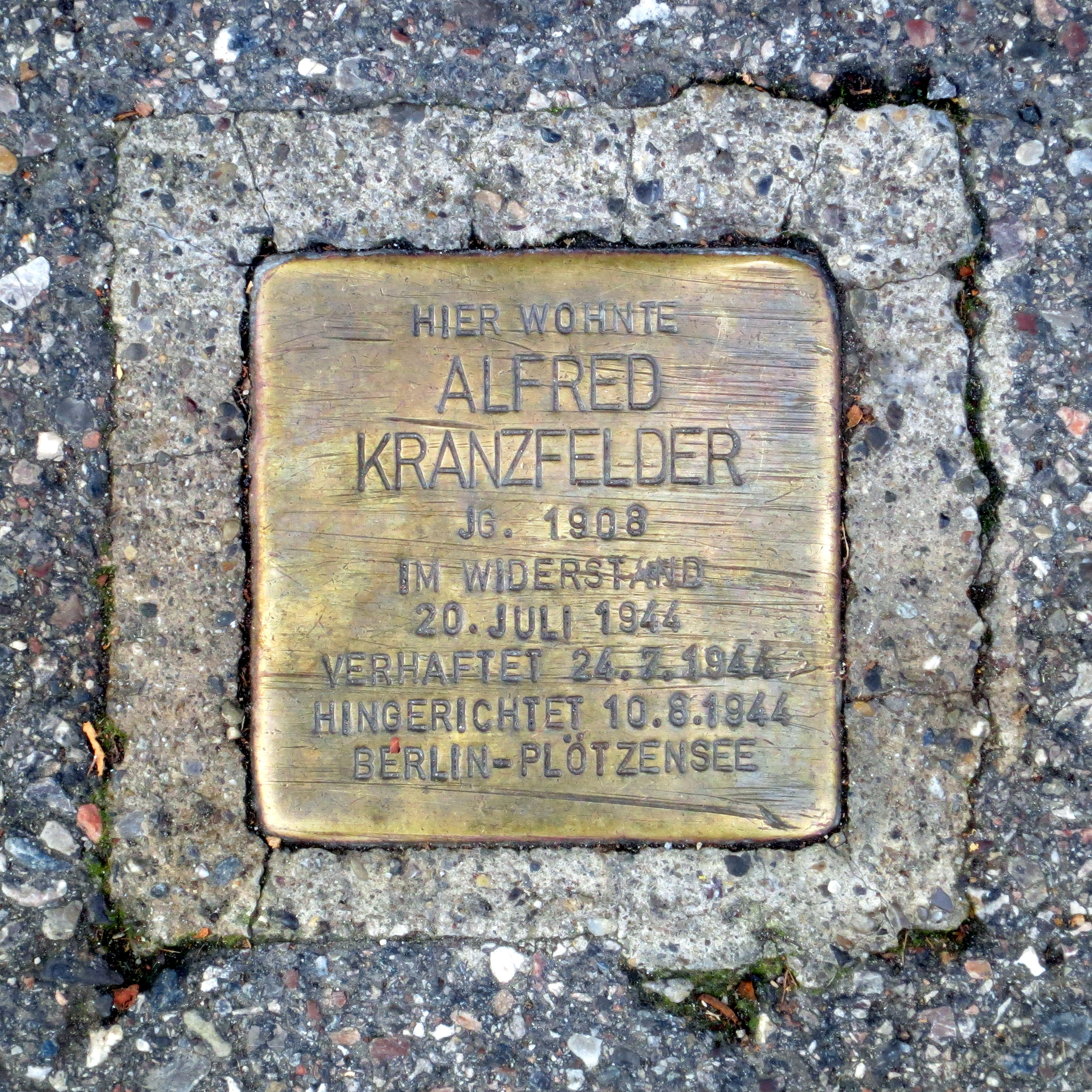
Stolperstein of Alfred Kranzfelder, Beethovenstraße 7 in Kempten (Allgäu)

Alfred Kranzfelder (10 February 1908 – 10 August 1944) was a German naval officer and a member of the German resistance against Adolf Hitler's Nazi regime.

He was born in Kempten im Allgäu, Bavaria and joined the Reichsmarine in 1927. In 1933 he was promoted to Leutnant zur See and in 1937 as a member of the Kriegsmarine he served on the pocket battleship Admiral Scheer. He was transferred to Berlin for health reasons in February 1940, where he worked in the Operations Department of the 1st Sea War Branch of the Naval High Command as liaison officer to the Foreign Ministry.

He met fellow naval officer Berthold Schenk Graf von Stauffenberg in 1943 and became active in the resistance against the Nazi regime. His opportunities to actively participate in the 20 July plot were limited but he was asked to find further potential resistance members in the navy.

He was arrested shortly after Berthold von Stauffenburg on 24 July 1944 and tried by the People's Court on 10 August 1944 with Erich Fellgiebel, Georg Hansen, Fritz-Dietlof von der Schulenburg and Berthold Schenk Graf von Stauffenberg. He was sentenced to death by Roland Freisler and executed by hanging on 10 August 1944 at Plötzensee Prison, Berlin.

== See also ==
- List of members of the 20 July plot
