= Carl Wentzel =

German 20 July Plot member (1875–1944)

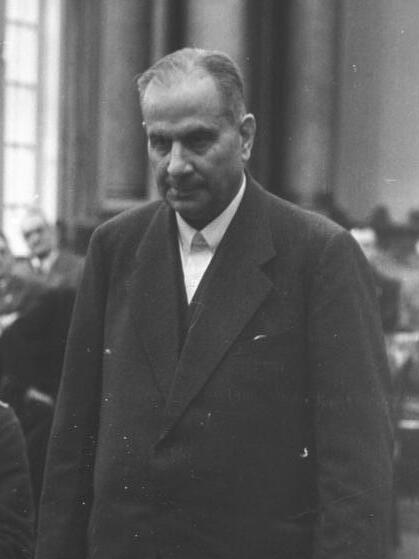
- Carl Wentzel appearing before the Volksgerichtshof
- Born: 9 December 1876; Brachwitz, German Empire
- Died: 20 December 1944 (aged 68); Plötzensee Prison, Berlin, Nazi Germany
- Cause of death: Execution by hanging
- Occupations: Farmer, agricultural contractor

Carl Wentzel-Teutschenthal (9 December 1876 – 20 December 1944) was a German farmer and agricultural contractor. He was executed at Plötzensee Prison in Berlin following the 20 July plot to assassinate Adolf Hitler.

== See also ==
- List of members of the 20 July plot
