= Hermann Winterhalter =

German painter (1808–1891)

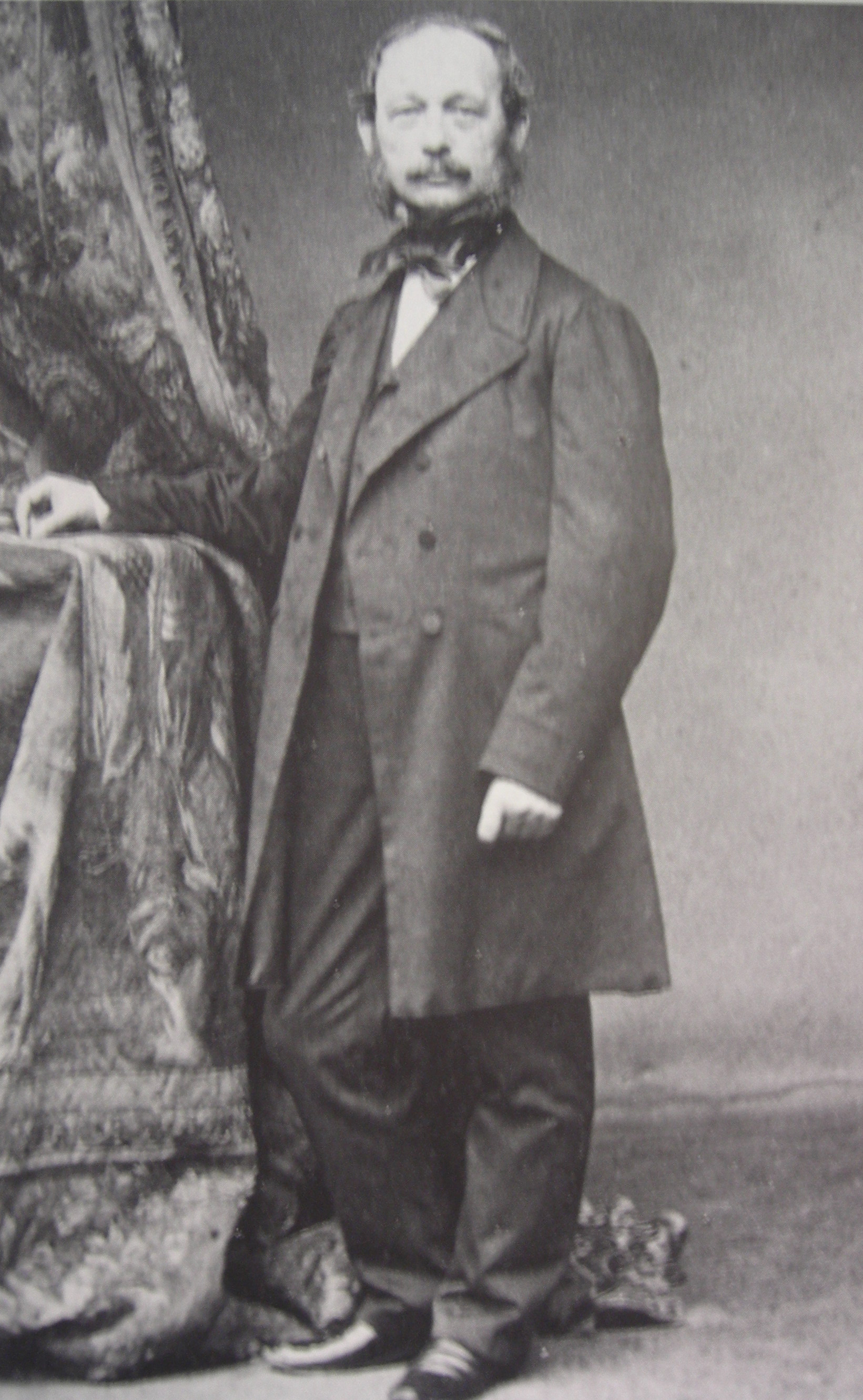
- Born: 23 September 1808; Menzenschwand, Black Forest, Grand Duchy of Baden
- Died: 24 February 1891 (aged 82); Karlsruhe
- Known for: Painting

Hermann Fidel Winterhalter (23 September 1808 – 24 February 1891) was a German painter, younger brother of the portrait painter Franz Xaver Winterhalter (1805–73).

== Life ==
Hermann Fidel Winterhalter was born in the small village of Menzenschwand (now part of Sankt Blasien) in the Black Forest, Grand Duchy of Baden. His father, Fidel Winterhalter, made him follow a career as a painter in the footsteps of his older brother. Hermann Winterhalter was first trained as a lithographer and later went to study painting in Munich and Rome. He settled in Paris where he assisted his brother and exhibited at the Salon 1838-41, 1847 and 1869.

So close was Hermann Winterhalter to his brother that not only his work but also his personality is hard to disassociate from his most famous sibling. There was no professional rivalry or personal friction in the many years they worked together. Hermann was an immense support to Franz Xaver's successful international career, and took charge of the latter's studio in Paris while he was abroad. He lived independently and had his own personality and points of view. In the 1850s, Hermann was more independent and developed a small portrait practice of his own. Among his works are Young Girl from Ariccia and the portrait of his Parisian patron Nicolas-Louis Planat de la Faye that is in the Louvre.

After the fall of the Second Empire, both brothers decided to retire in Baden. Franz Xaver died in 1873; Hermann survived his brother for almost twenty years, dying in Karlsruhe on 24 February 1891.

== Gallery ==
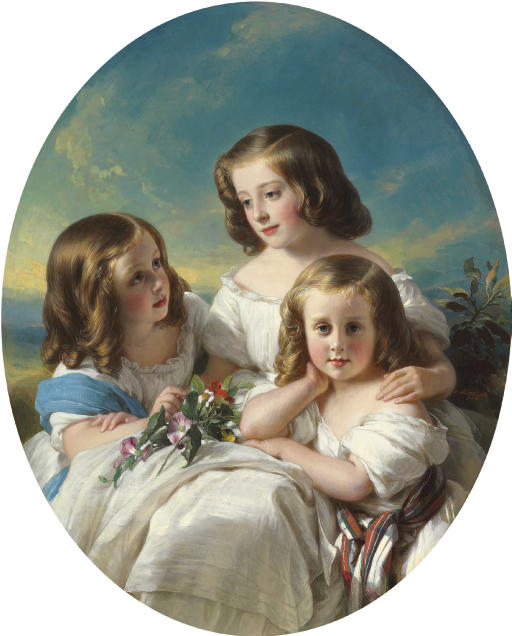
Three demoiselles de la famille de Chateaubourg by Hermann Fidel Winterhalter, oil on canvas, 1850.

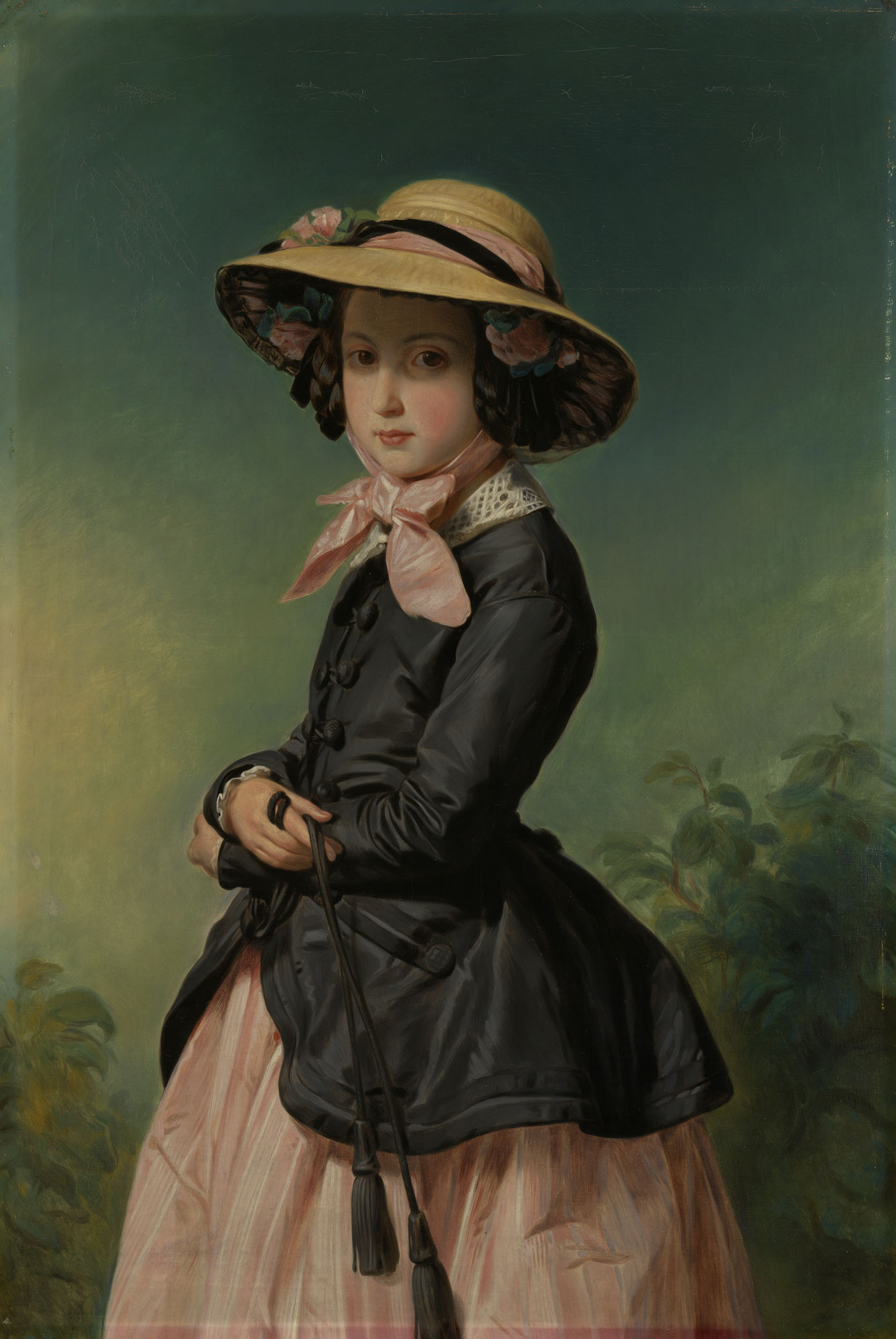
Portrait of Princess Charlotte of Belgium (1840-1927), 1848

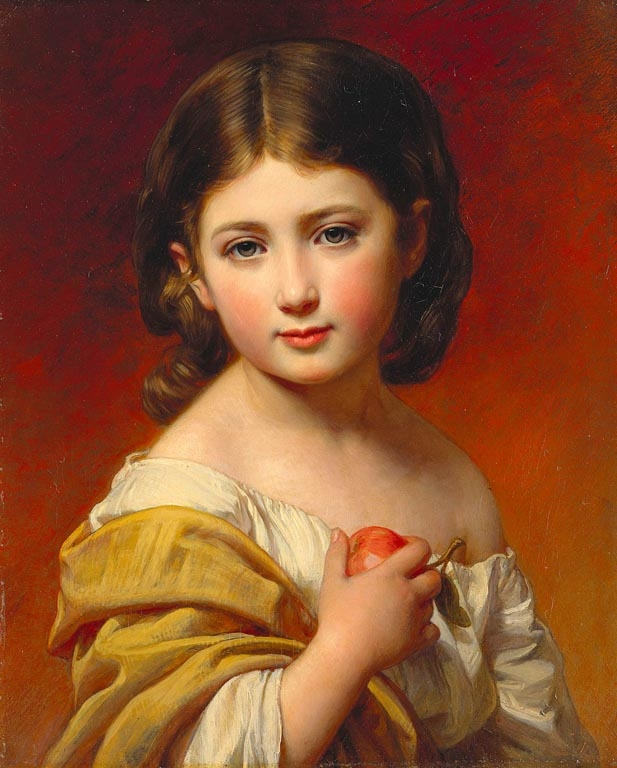
Simplicity, 1843

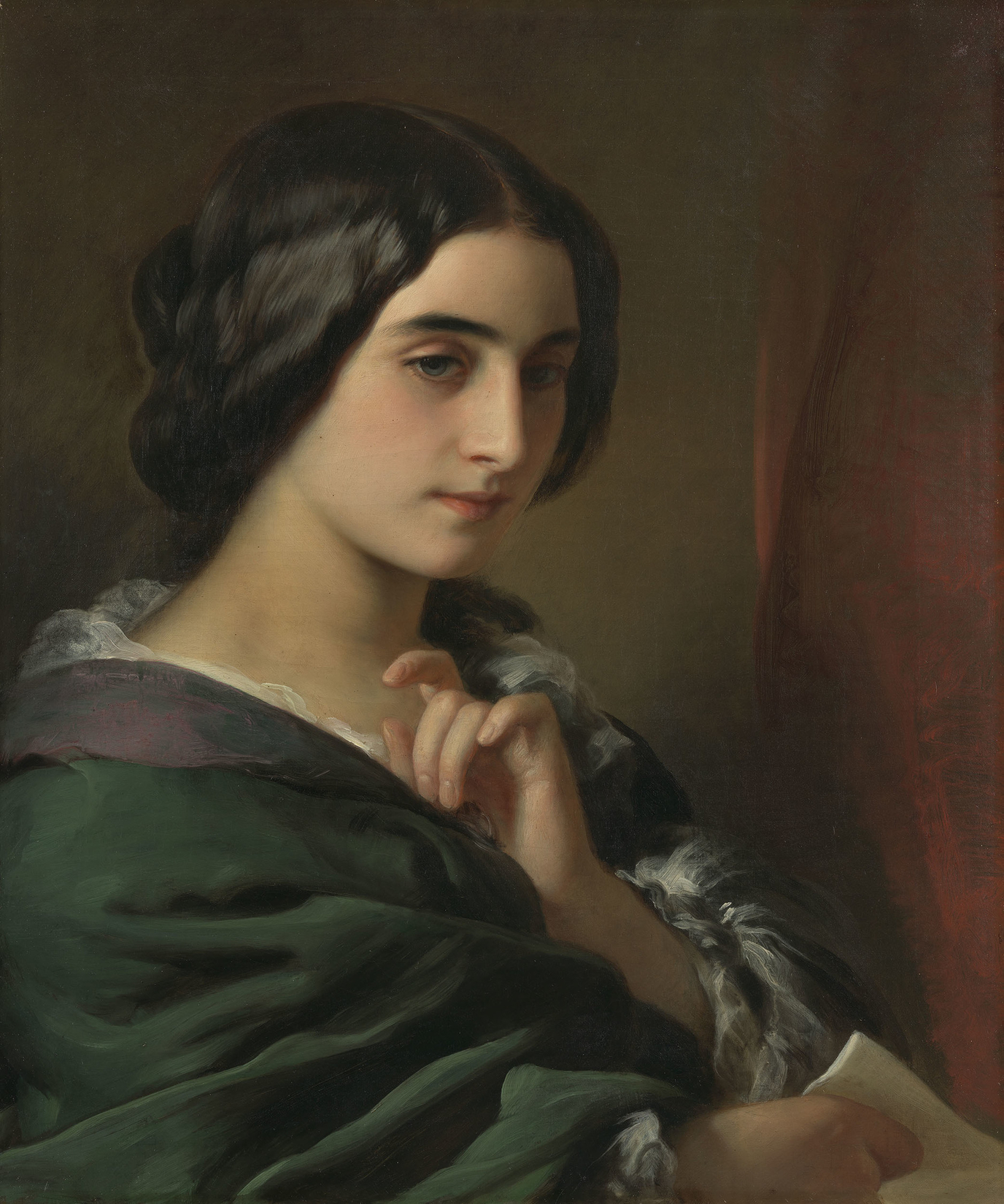
Head of a Young Woman, 1849
