= Cross of Adelheid =

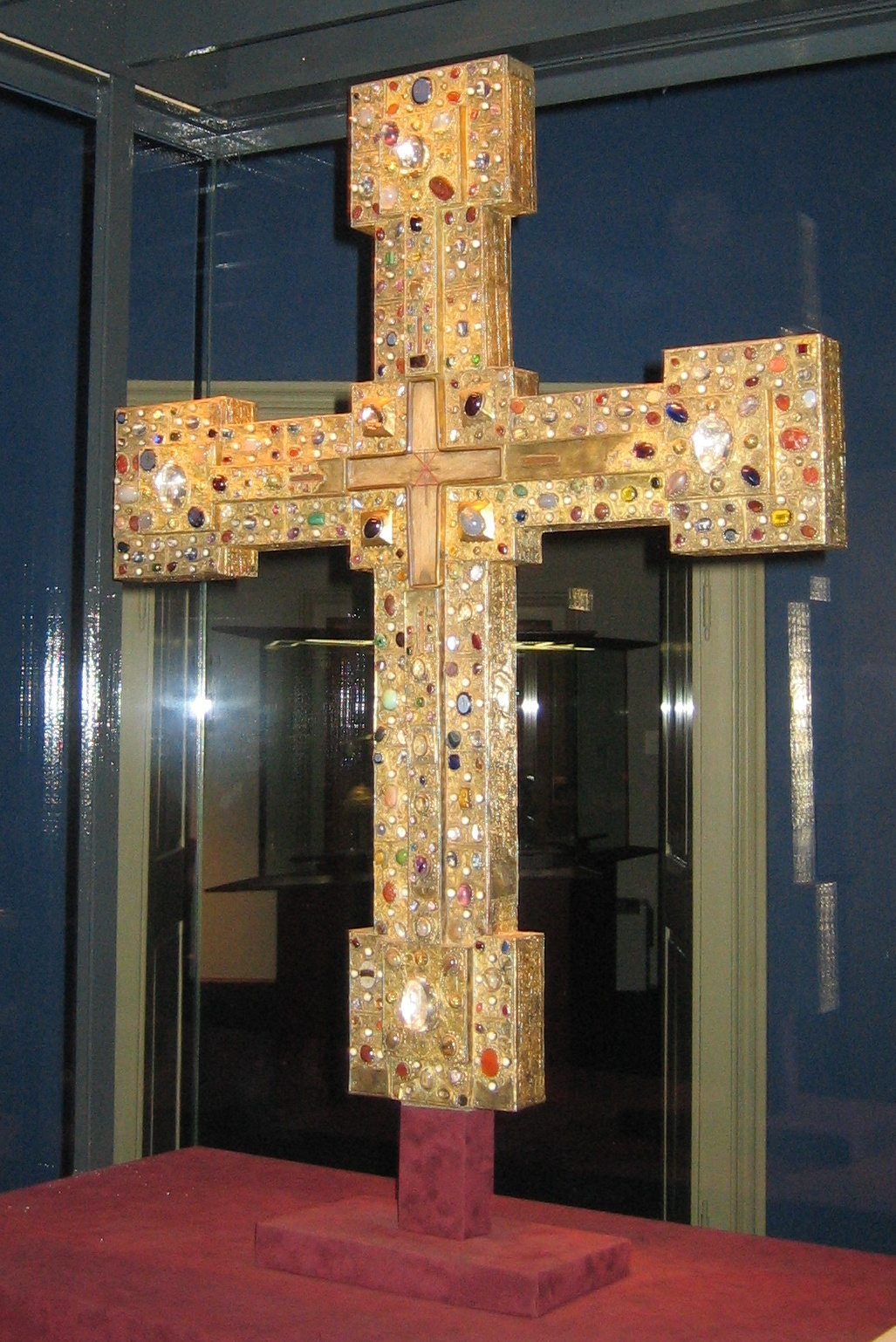
Cross of Adelheid

The Cross of Adelheid is an 11th-12th century reliquary in the form of a crux gemmata. It is held in Saint Paul's Abbey, Lavanttal. It was commissioned by Adelheid, daughter of Rudolf of Rheinfelden, passing to St. Blaise Abbey in the 19th century before coming to its present home. The Cross of Adelheid is known as the largest German reliquary to survive from the High Middle Ages (middle 11th-middle 13th century). It is made of a wooden core covered with gilded silver plate. The four arms of the cross extend from the middle square. The lower arm is the longest and the other three are the same length. Each arm of the Cross ends in a square. On the front are gems, pearls and precious stones. It is 82.9 cm high, 65.4 cm wide and 7.4 to 7.8 cm deep. There are a total of 170 gems on the cross, with only 147 remaining. The remaining gems are: 47 amethysts, 22 carnelians, 17 agates, 13 rock crystals, 7 moonstones, 6 garnets, 5 chalcedonies, 5 onyxes, 4 almandines, 4 heliotropes, 3 turquoises, 2 beryls, 2 serpentines, 1 lapis lazuli, 1 emerald, 1 milk opal and 1 smoky quartz.

The Cross of Adelheid is said to contain fragments of the True Cross, which is said to be the cross that Jesus was crucified on.

== Description ==
The ends of the arms are widened into squares.

On the front, the armholes are divided lengthwise into three sections, with the central section raised by approximately one centimetre, as are the adjacent squares at the ends of the arms. All surfaces are subdivided into smaller panels. Each panel is symmetrically decorated with a large gemstone in the center, four smaller ones in the corner, and either pearls or gilded metal buttons. The spaces between are filled with filigree spirals. The gemstones are no longer fully intact. Of the original 170, 147 remain: among these are 47 amethysts, 22 carnelians, 17 agates, 13 rock crystals, 7 moonstones, 6 garnets, 5 chalcedony, 5 onyx, 4 almandines, 4 heliotropes, 3 turquoises, 2 beryls, 2 serpentines, and one lapis lazuli, emerald, milk opal, and smoky quartz. The central square formerly housed an unusually large fragment of the True Cross. When this was transferred to a new reliquary at the end of the 17th century, a piece of wood in a gilded copper setting was inserted into the Adelheid Cross, into which two small fragments of the True Cross were set in a cross shape. This relic remains in the Adelheid Cross to this day.

The reverse of the cross was created in St. Blasien Abbey under Abbot Gunther von Andlau (1141–1170). It is covered with gold leaf, into which figurative depictions and inscriptions are engraved with a burin. In the central panel, Christ, giving blessing, is enthroned within a mandorla. The squares at the ends of the arms depict the symbols of the four Evangelists, surrounded by scrolls: above, the eagle of John; to the right, the ox of Luke; to the left, the lion of Mark; and below, the winged man of Matthew . The arms show two angels at the top, and two apostles on each side: Peter and John in the center, and probably Paul and Andrew or James on the outside . The lower arm is only partially preserved and shows four figures: directly below Christ, a seated Virgin Mary is presumed to be; below her, the donor of the reverse, Abbot Gunther; and to his side, a clergyman wearing a mitre. At the very bottom are two deacons, one of whom is identifiable as a monk by his tonsure . All three are identified as saints by halos . By analogy with the Gothic high altar of St. Blasien, the saints are believed to be Blasius, Stephen, and Lawrence.

The inscriptions on the reverse side mention the dedication by Adelheid as well as the later one by Abbot Gunther, and the names of the saints whose relics were probably located in the long rectangular openings on the front and in bores of individual gemstones.

The sides are decorated with a woven band pattern, likely dating from the time of Abbot Gunther. The band pattern is two rows long and has four strands.

== History ==
The history of the cross is recorded in two sources: the 12th-century book Liber constructionis monasterii ad S. Blasium (Book on the Construction of St. Blasien Abbey) and the 16th-century Liber Originum Monasterij Sancti Blasij (Book on the Origin of St. Blasien Abbey). According to these sources, the large fragments of the True Cross were presented to St. Blasien Abbey by Queen Adelheid, wife of King Ladislaus I of Hungary and daughter of Rudolf of Rheinfelden, along with 70 gold pieces for a suitable reliquary. The occasion was the burial of her mother in St. Blasien in 1079. Adelheid also stipulated that she herself should be buried there. The relic supposedly came from her brother-in-law, Ceysa. The abbot at the time of the donation was Giselbert (1068–1086). According to the inscription on its now-lost base, the cross was completed under his successor, Uto of Kyburg (1086–1108). Its intended location is therefore assumed to be the tombs or an associated altar. The cross has also often been considered a replacement insignia for Adelheid's father, Rudolf of Rheinfelden (1077–1080, " anti-king"), as a replacement for the imperial cross. Other authors consider this unlikely, partly due to a lack of sources.

The current reverse side was only created later under Abbot Gunther (1141–1170), and Gunther is also named as the patron in the inscription on the reverse. Sources cite doubts about the authenticity of the large fragment of the True Cross as the reason for this late "completion," doubts which were supposedly only resolved by an ordeal under Gunther. This legend is now interpreted as an attempt to "prove" the authenticity of the relic or to legitimize the alterations to the cross, which was hardly incomplete. Swabia is assumed to be the origin of the reverse side. The cross's design—like other crosses in Cologne, Hildesheim, or Osnabrück, for example—is based on the Imperial Cross, the most important reliquary cross of the time . It is the largest reliquary cross from this period and even surpasses the Imperial Cross in height. It shares the square ends of the crossbeams and the square central panel only with the Imperial Cross. The division of the arms into three parts appears several times in medieval gold crosses, such as the Ardennes Cross (now in the Germanisches Nationalmuseum in Nuremberg) or the Cruz de la Victoria (treasure of the Cathedral of Oviedo ), and thus refers to traditions from the first Christian millennium.

What is striking about the cross is the absence of a prominent inscription and a donor portrait. It is assumed that these were removed during the reworking under Abbot Gunther. This reworking coincided with a change in its use: while the cross was initially likely located at Adelheid's grave, it was now used for liturgical purposes. This also corresponds to the intentions of the church reforms of the time, in which St. Blasien played a leading role. The relic of the cross was made removable under Gunther, and here the relic is fully visible. In comparable crosses, the relic is located behind a rock crystal; the four gemstones in the corners of the central panel also suggest the presence of a gemstone in the center.
