= Busso Thoma =

Salesman and a member of the German Resistance (1899–1945)

Busso Thoma (31 October 1899 – 23 January 1945) was a salesman and a member of the German Resistance against Adolf Hitler. He was sentenced to death in connection with the failed 20 July Plot.

Thoma was born in Sankt Blasien-Immeneich, Black Forest and fought in WWI as a lieutenant. In 1939, he became a consultant on the staff of the General Army Office (AHA), where, as a Major, he later became an accessory to the 20 July Plot to assassinate German dictator Adolf Hitler. On 14 September 1944, Thoma was arrested, on 17 January 1945, he was sentenced to death by the People's Court. On 23 January 1945, he was hanged at Plötzensee Prison in Berlin.

== Sources ==
- Plötzensee Prison

== See also ==
- List of members of the 20 July plot
