= Otto Armster =

German intelligence officer (1891–1957)

Otto Armster (11 July 1891 in Preetz – 21 September 1957) was a German military intelligence-officer and a member of the German resistance, involved in the 20 July 1944 attempt to assassinate Adolf Hitler.

== Life ==
Armster was a friend of Admiral Wilhelm Canaris head of the counter-intelligence (Abwehr) and stood in contact with the circuit of resistance since 1939. As a colonel and head of the counter-intelligence station in Vienna since April 1944, he worked closely with Georg Alexander Hansen, Hans Oster and Ludwig Gehre.

In connection with his resistance activities Armster had constant contact to General Friedrich Olbricht and other conspirators of the 20 July plot, through Olbricht’s confidant Hermann Kaiser. Armster has been designated by the conspirators to become liaison officer of defense circle XVIII (Salzburg).

On 23 July 1944 Armster had been arrested by the Gestapo and transported to Berlin, where he was taken into custody at the solitary confinement prison on Lehrter Street until 25 April 1945. By 15 May 1945 the NKVD arrested and consequently abducted him to the Soviet Union, where he was kept imprisoned until 1955.

== See also ==
- List of members of the 20 July plot
