= Herbert Wagner (general) =

- Born: 19 January 1896
- Died: 5 September 1968 (aged 72)
- Military career
- Allegiance: Nazi Germany
- Branch: Army (Wehrmacht)
- Service years: 1914-1945
- Rank: Generalleutnant
- Commands: 132. Infanterie-Division
- Conflicts: World War II
- Awards: Knight's Cross of the Iron Cross

Herbert Wagner (19 January 1896 – 5 September 1968) was a German general during World War II. He was a recipient of the Knight's Cross of the Iron Cross.

== Awards and decorations ==
- Knight's Cross of the Iron Cross on 23 October 1944 as Generalleutnant and commander of 132. Infanterie-Division

Military offices
Preceded by General der Artillerie Fritz Lindemann	Commander of 132. Infanterie-Division; 12 August 1943 – 8 January 1945	Succeeded by Generalmajor Rudolf Demme
