= Günther Smend =

German Army officer and a member of the 20 July Plot (1912–1944)

Günther Smend (29 November 1912 – 8 September 1944) was a German Army officer and a member of the resistance involved in the 20 July Plot to assassinate Adolf Hitler.

== Life ==
Günther Smend was born in Trier to Captain Julius Smend. After being wounded in battle, his father was posted to the War Ministry in Berlin. There, from 1921 to 1924, Günther Smend went to the Berlin-Friedenau Gymnasium. Finally, the family moved to Mülheim an der Ruhr for job reasons.

Günther Smend joined the army as an officer cadet in 1932, and was deployed along with his unit, Infantry Regiment No. 18, in France and on the Eastern Front after the outbreak of the Second World War. In December 1942, Smend was ordered to the General Staff, and as of June 1943 he was adjutant to Army Chief of the General Staff, Colonel General Kurt Zeitzler. He was a lieutenant colonel on the General Staff, winner of the Iron Cross, first and second classes. He was awarded the German Cross in gold on 22 November 1941.

Smend began to work together with the military opposition against Hitler. He shared the plotters' worry that the war would lead to defeat owing to Hitler's incompetence. He tried to get his superior Zeitzler to participate in the plot, but to no avail. After the attempt to assassinate Hitler with a briefcase bomb at the Wolf's Lair in East Prussia on 20 July 1944 failed, Günther Smend was arrested on 1 August 1944 as a consequence of his failed attempt at winning Zeitzler's support. On 30 August 1944 he was sentenced to death by the Volksgerichtshof, with Roland Freisler presiding, as an accessory, and on 8 September 1944 he was hanged at Plötzensee Prison in Berlin.

In March 1939, he wed Renate von Cossel, whom he had met at a ball before the war. They had three children, despite long separations due to wartime service: Henriette, Rudolf and Axel.

== See also ==
- List of members of the 20 July plot
