= Georg Hansen =

German military officer (1904–1944)

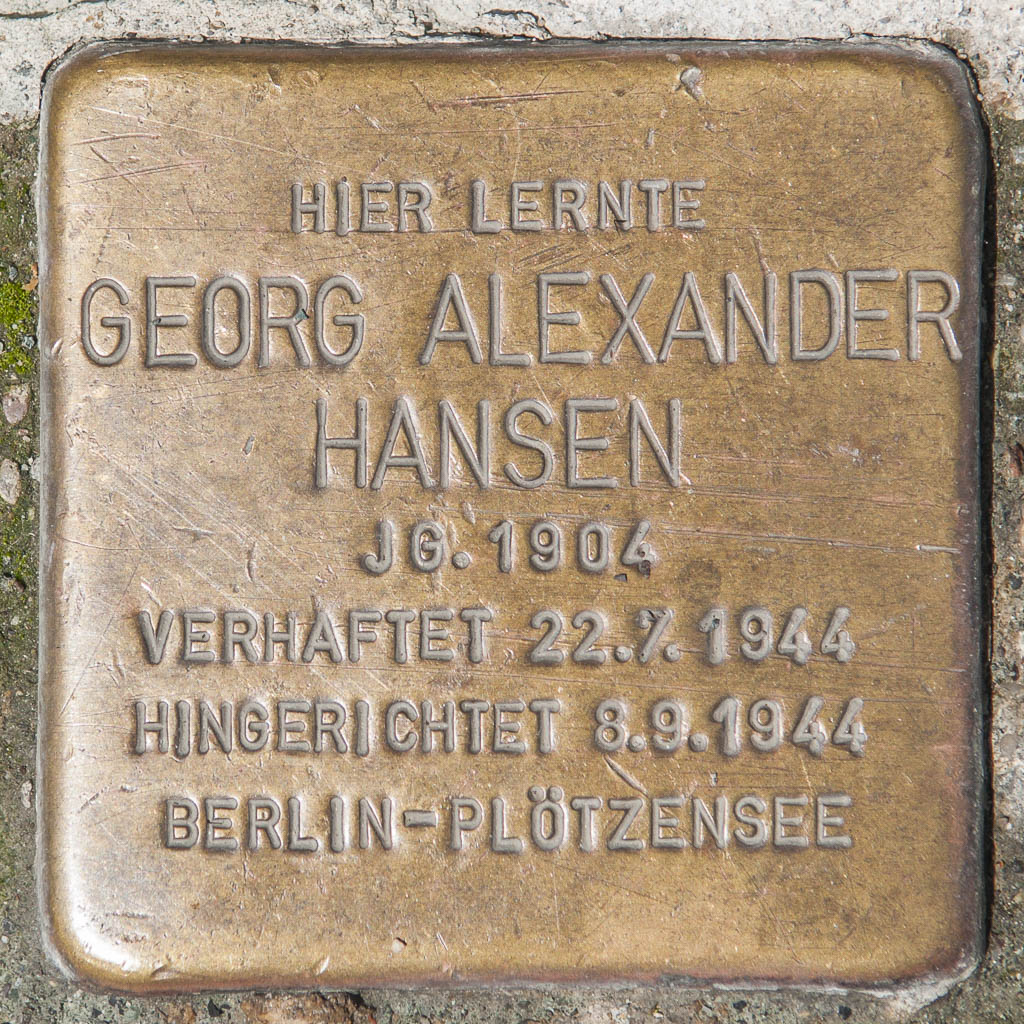
Stolperstein for Hansen in Coburg

Georg Alexander Hansen (5 July 1904 – 8 September 1944) was an Oberst (Colonel) in the Generalstab (General Staff of the German Army) and one of the participants in the German Resistance against the Nazis. Chief of the Abwehr Wilhelm Canaris appointed Colonel Hansen as his successor as head of military counterintelligence before his removal from office in February 1944.

== Life ==
Hansen was born in Sonnefeld, the son of Theodor Hansen, a Oberforstmeister (senior forester) for the Duchy of Saxe-Coburg and Gotha, and his wife Ottilie, née Mardorf. In Coburg, he attended since 1914 the Gymnasium Casimirianum, where he graduated with Abitur in 1923. He then studied law for two semesters at the University of Erlangen. In 1924, he joined the Panzergruppe of the Reichswehr (later the Wehrmacht). He was promoted to Leutnant in 1927, and then Oberleutnant in 1931 at the Bavarian Motor Vehicles Department in Fürth. In the same year, he married Irene Stölzel from Michelau; with her he had five children.

In 1935, Hansen became the commander of the general staff training at the Military Academy (Kriegsakademie) in Berlin-Moabit, where he met the Chief of General Staff Ludwig Beck and Graf Claus von Stauffenberg. In 1937, he was transferred from the training academy to the Department of Foreign Intelligence and Counterintelligence (Department of Foreign Armies of the East) in the War Ministry of the Reich under the command of Konteradmiral Wilhelm Canaris. Beginning in 1939, this department was renamed as Amt Ausland / Abwehr (Office of the Foreign Military Intelligence). There Hansen, as a group leader in Division I, was promoted to major in May 1941 and Oberstleutnant in July 1942. In 1943 he succeeded Hans Piekenbrock as the Chief of the Division I, Secret Intelligence Service. His tasks included military reconnaissance in the foreign countries. Finally, Canaris, before his resignation in February 1944, appointed Georg Hansen to succeed him as Head of Military Intelligence.

In March 1944, Hansen attended a meeting with the Sicherheitsdienst (SD) to set up a unified intelligence service. Two months later, in May 1944, he and most of his staff were transferred to the Reichssicherheitshauptamt (RSHA), where he served as the deputy under his immediate superior, Walther Schellenberg.

=== Assassination attempt on Hitler ===
Probably under the influence of Beck, Hansen's conversion took himself to the opposition by 1938; the official review of the crimes of the Nazi Regime might have led him to finally join the Resistance. He was one of the key informants of the resistance group led by two men, Generalmajor Henning von Tresckow and Oberst Claus Count von Stauffenberg. Hansen worked since 1943 in all plans for the Hitler assassination attempt. In 1944, he took part in the most important meetings about the preparations. Hansen organised the use of cars and airplanes as well as the protection of the co-conspirators. His house in Rangsdorf often served as the meeting place for the conspirators. If the attack succeeded, he would occupy the RSHA and have the SS commanders arrested. In addition, it was planned to have him, on the behalf of Beck, who was assigned as interim Head of State, to negotiate with General Dwight D. Eisenhower for a separate accord of peace with the Western Powers. Because of strong disagreements with Stauffenberg about the political plans after the attack, Hansen decided on short notice against personal participation and drove on 18 July to Michelau for the baptism of his youngest daughter. Although he knew that Hitler had survived the attack and that the coup attempt had failed, and despite the possibility of escape, he returned on 21 July. On 22 July the Gestapo chief, Heinrich Müller, summoned him to the RSHA, where Hansen was arrested in the waiting room. He was put through a prolonged interrogation, during which he broke down and confessed to everything.

On 4 August he was given by the Ehrenhof (Court of Honour), formed two days earlier, a dishonourable discharge from the Wehrmacht, so that the court-martial (Reichskriegsgericht) was no longer responsible for the sentencing.

== Death ==
On the day of the arraignment, 10 August 1944, Georg Hansen, as well as Erich Fellgiebel, Alfred Kranzfelder, Fritz-Dietlof Graf von der Schulenburg and Berthold Schenk Graf von Stauffenberg were, in a show trial at the Volksgerichtshof under President Roland Freisler, sentenced to death. On 8 September 1944, the judgment was execution by hanging at Plötzensee Prison.

== Aftermath ==
The Hansen family was deemed to be guilty by association. Its properties were confiscated, the wife was arrested and the five children were placed in a children's home in Bad Sachsa, where they were not permitted to carry the family name. In the same home were also the children of other conspirators, such as the Stauffenbergs and von Witzlebens. In late September 1944, the children were allowed to return to their mother, who was also released, in Michelau.

The hostility towards the family continued even after the end of the war. Hansen's widow waged a year-long fight against the Federal Republic of Germany in the courts to obtain a pension as a war widow. But the courts denied her because her husband had been dishonourably discharged from the Wehrmacht.

== See also ==
- List of members of the 20 July plot

== Bibliography ==
- (in English) Joachim Fest, Plotting Hitler's Death: The German Resistance to Hitler, 1933–1945 (London: Weidenfeld & Nicolson, 1994), ISBN 0-297-81774-4
- (in German) Rupert Appeltshauser, “Im Konflikt zwischen Pflichterfüllung und Widerstand: Anmerkungen zu Oberst Georg Alexander Hansen und dessen Rolle in der Opposition gegen Hitler [In the Conflict Between Duty and Resistance: Notes on Colonel Georg Alexander Hansen and His Role in the Opposition Against Hitler]”. In: Jahrbuch der Coburger Landesstiftung [Yearbook of the Coburger Land Foundation], Volume 50 (2005), ISSN 0084-8808, pp. 221–228.
- (in German) Jürgen Erdmann, “Mein Platz ist in Berlin – Georg Hansen [My Place is in Berlin – George Hansen]”. In: Stefan Nöth (ed.), Coburg 1056–2006. Ein Streifzug durch 950 Jahre Geschichte von Stadt und Land [Coburg 1056–2006. A Journey Through 950 Years of History of the City and Land] (Stegaurach: Wikomm-Verlag, 2006), ISBN 3-86652-082-4.
