= Sankt Blasien =

Town in Waldshut, Germany

- Town
- Coat of arms

- Location of Sankt Blasien within Waldshut district
- Interactive map of Sankt Blasien
- Location within Germany Location within Baden-Württemberg
- Coordinates: 47°45′43″N 8°7′42″E
- Country: Germany
- State: Baden-Württemberg
- Admin. region: Freiburg
- District: Waldshut

Government
  - Mayor (2017–25): Adrian Probst

Area
  - Total: 54.41 km^{2} (21.01 sq mi)
- Elevation: 770 m (2,530 ft)

Population (2025-12-31)
  - Total: 3,832
  - Density: 70.43/km^{2} (182.4/sq mi)
- Time zone: UTC+01:00 (CET)
  - Summer (DST): UTC+02:00 (CEST)
- Postal codes: 79837
- Dialling codes: 07672
- Vehicle registration: WT
- Website: www.st-blasien.de

St. Blasien (German pronunciation: [zaŋkt ˈblaːziən]; sometimes spelled in full as Sankt Blasien) is a small town located in the Waldshut district in Baden-Württemberg, Germany. It is situated in the Southern Black Forest, 17 km northeast of Waldshut-Tiengen.

St. Blaise's Abbey in the Black Forest is located in St. Blasien. The town is twinned with Laténa in Switzerland. It is home to the Jesuit college-preparatory school, Kolleg St. Blasien.

== History ==
=== Abbey history ===
The benedictine abbey, or St. Blaise's Abbey, in what is today known as St. Blasien was first mentioned in 858. The history of the city is closely tied to that of the abbey, which reached its heyday under the leadership of prince-abbot Martin Gerbert from 1764 to 1793. In 1771, Gerbert ordered the construction of the abbey's striking, classicism-style dome church based on plans by architects Pierre Michel d’Ixnard and Nicolas de Pigage and under the leadership of project manager Franz Josef Salzmann. St. Blasien abbey was secularized in 1806. The last remaining monks relocated to the St. Paul diocese in the Lavant Valley in the Alp-city Carinthia, taking with them art treasures such as the remains of 12 Habsburgs and the Cross of Adelheid. On September 26, 1808, Baden's new Grand Duke Charles Frederick ordered a review to determine whether the expensive maintenance of the dome still made sense or if the money should instead be used to build a more modest but less costly parish church.

In 1809, Zurich native mechanic and inventor Johann Georg Bodmer began to establish one of the first engineering works in Germany using the former abbey buildings. After Baden found a potent financial backer in David von Eichthal, it granted the Societé St. Blaise the right to use the premises (which were now hosting a mechanical spinning factory) for the next 10 years. The company manufactured handguns, whose rawly forged components could now for the first time be processed further using specialized machines and even be produced in series. It also manufactured coining machines for the mint in Mannheim. Bodmer also ran tests with the then completely unheard of rear loading system for canons and an early version of the conveyor belt. In 1816, the factory employed 809 people and was therefore one of the focal points of early industrialism in Baden. In 1821, after Bodmer had left the company, the investor Baron David von Eichthal bought the building complex. He ordered Frenchman Benoît Fourneyron to install what was then the most powerful reaction turbine (40 PS) in Europe and further expanded the cotton spinning factory. In 1853, 28.000 spindles were in use at the factory, which accounted for roughly a quarter of production in all of Baden. The company was nevertheless commercially unsuccessful. As a result of the financial crisis in Frankfurt and Karlsruhe as well as the revolution of 1848/1849 the company was shut down. The abbey buildings were sold to the textile fabricator Carl Wilhelm Grether and the banker Obermaier in 1852.

Under the direction of Grether's son-in-law, Ernst Friedrich Krafft, the cotton-spinning factory was reopened and evolved into a business that would prosper many decades. After the big fire of the abbey in 1874, Krafft was also able to reconstruct the spinning factory and rule it successfully. By October 1931, however, it went bankrupt because of the global economy crisis.

Between 1934 and 1939 and from 1946 onwards, the abbey housed the Jesuit-led boarding school Kolleg St. Blasien. During World War II, the building was used as a military hospital.

=== The health resort – St. Blasien’s rise to a spa town with international reputation ===
In 1882 the businessman Otto Hüglin began the construction of the health resort, which comprised a central building as well as others, which Hüglin throughout its first decade developed into a prestigious, colossal establishment with all modern conveniences. Roughly 200 rooms accommodate 300 people. Hüglin convinced Hermann Determann to oversee the spa's medical direction; he converted the resort into a highly efficient, water-based sanatorium. In 2014, after considerable research, it became known that from the middle of the 1880s to World War I, celebrities from all over the world frequently visited the spa of St. Blasien for treatments lasting several weeks. Among them were the pianist and founder of the Berlin Philharmonic Orchestra, Hans von Bülow (1893), to whom the famous first piano concerto of Tschaikovsky is dedicated; the then world-renowned Polish pianist Józef Hofmann, who as a ten-year-old child made his legendary debut in New York in 1867; 15-year-old Prince Gawriil Konstantinowitsch Romanow of St. Petersburg (1902); Hermann Sudermann, the most performed dramatist of his time (1903); Otto Brahm, the head of German theater in Berlin (1903); Hugo Stinnes, an industrialist and the then-richest man in Germany (1903); the explorer Eugen Wolf (1903); the painter Fritz Mackensen (1905); the Grand Duke of Luxembourg, William IV, with his wife (1906); the writer Stefan Zweig of Vienna (1909); Paul Warburg from New York, son of the banker's family of Hamburg and co-founder of the US-Federal Reserve Bank (1910); the wife and son of Leon Sidelsky of Vladivostok, co-builder of the trans-Siberian railway (1913); Konrad Adenauer, then Lord Mayor of Cologne (1917); and many other famous names of politics, science, literature and art from Germany as well as the rest of the world.

The health resort was expanded and in parallel with it St. Blasien's health resort became one of Europe's best-known medical institutes. Due to that, many famous people such as author Heinrich Mann (1892) and Russian revolutionary Maxim Gorki (1921) took the cure there. The latter visited St. Blasien based on a recommendation by Lenin who had stayed in Zürich before WWI. Because of its modern spa facilities, metropolitan flair, seclusion and romantic location in the Black Forest, St. Blasien was favored by the Grand Duke of Baden Frederick I (German: Friedrich I.) and his wife Luise. Between 1870 and 1906, they often stayed in the Friedrich-Luise-Ruhe building, which was named after them, during their curative stays. During that time, St. Blasien received its town charter and obtained the approval to complete the renovation on the domed church. In September 1918, Prince Max of Baden, the last Reich Chancellor of the German Empire, stayed in St. Blasien. Only weeks later he arbitrarily announced Wilhelm II’s abdication in Berlin.

The first famous personalities to come to St. Blasien in the 19th century were liberal journalist and literary critic Ludwig Börne (1832), composer Felix Mendelssohn Bartholdy with his wife Cécile on their honeymoon in 1837, and Franklin Delano Roosevelt, later president of the U.S. Roosevelt visited St. Blasien each year until he turned 14 with his parents for hiking and cycling. In 1905 he spent a part of his honeymoon there as well. One of the last well-known people to come to St. Blasien was the world-famous opera singer Heinrich Schulnus with his wife in 1945 during the end of WWII. After the health resort was sold and the health resort St. Blasien AG was dissolved by Otto Hüglin and his son Albert Hüglin in 1925, the town's level of renown gradually decreased.

== Notable people ==
- Franz Xaver Winterhalter (1805–1873), lithographer and painter of flattering portraits of royalty
- Hermann Winterhalter (1808–1891), painter, younger brother of the Franz Xaver Winterhalter.
- Alfred Buntru (1887–1974), water engineer, academic and rector of the RWTH Aachen University.
- Josef Glaser (1887–1969), national football (soccer) player; competed in the 1912 Summer Olympics
- Busso Thoma (1899–1945) executed by the Nazi regime as a co-conspirator in the 20 July plot to assassinate Hitler.

== See also ==
- List of cities and towns in Germany

== Gallery ==
Sankt Blasien

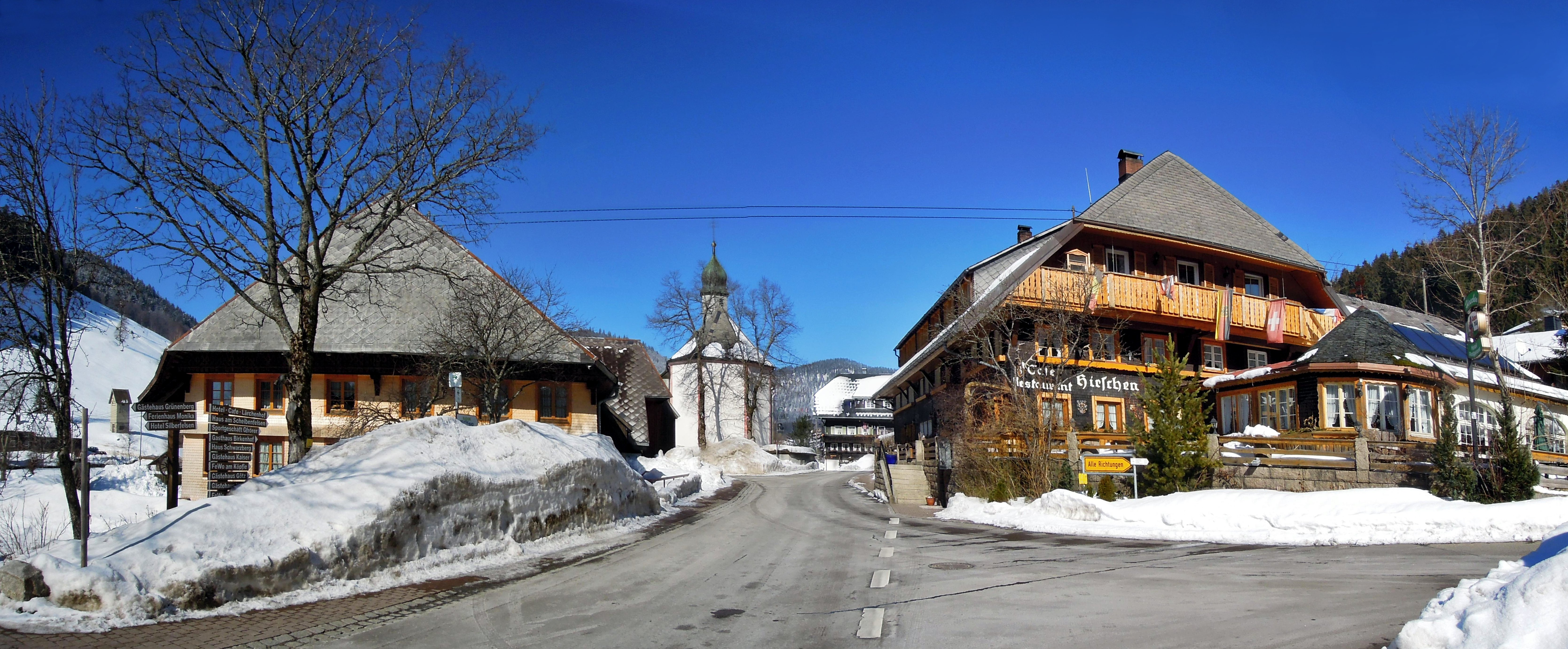
Menzenschwand

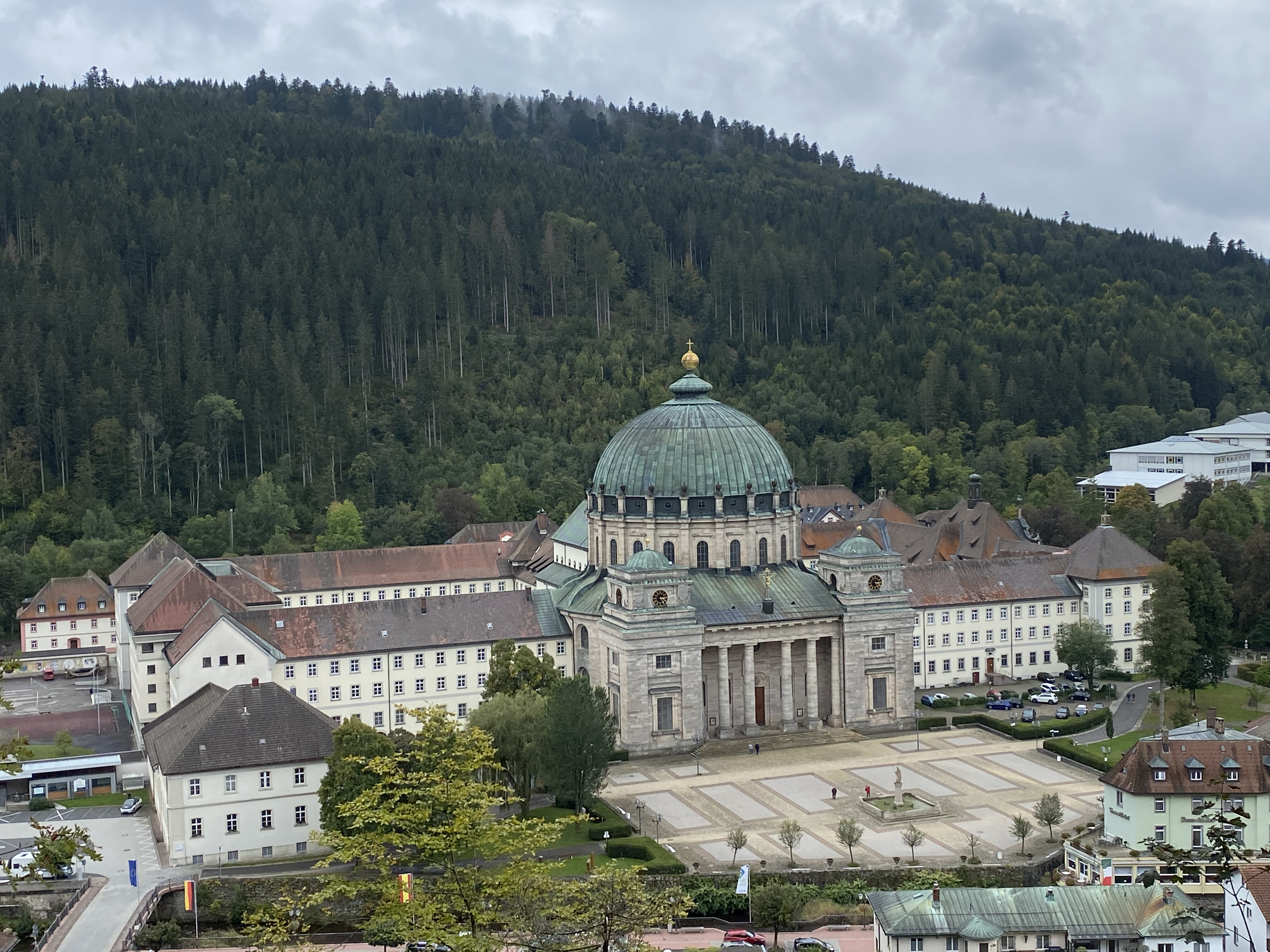
St. Blaise Abbey

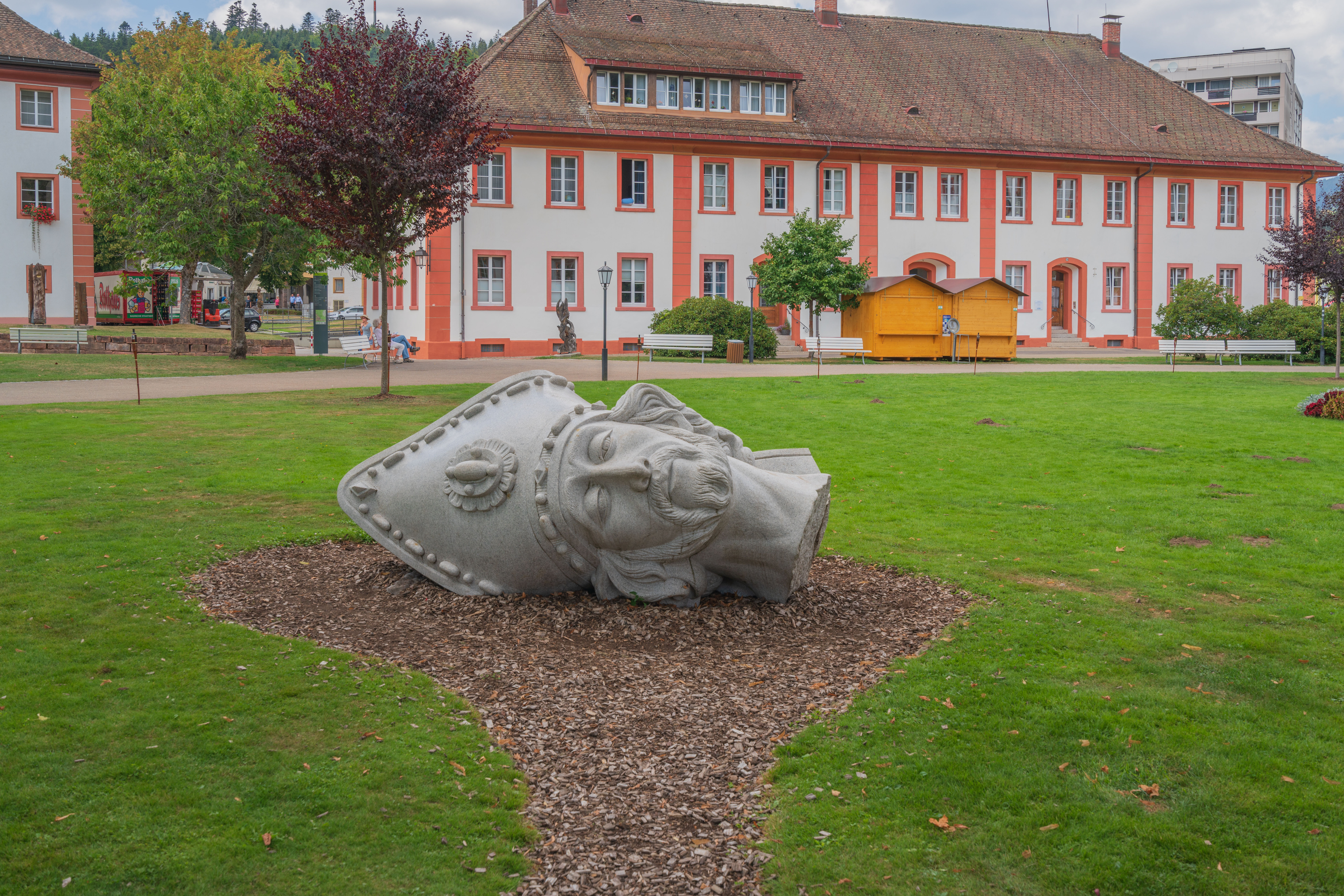
Artwork, 2018
