= Fritz Lindemann =

German general (1894–1944)

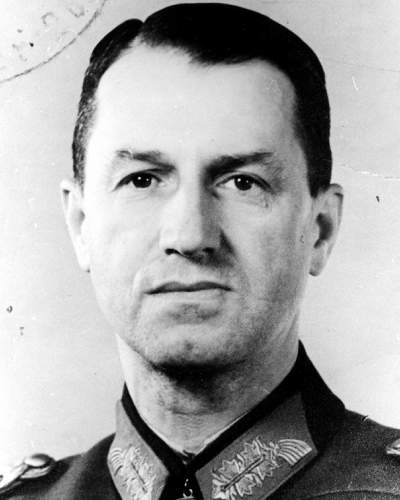
- Lindemann in 1943
- Born: 11 April 1894; Berlin-Charlottenburg, German Empire
- Died: 22 September 1944 (aged 50); Berlin, Nazi Germany
- Military career
- Allegiance: German Empire; Weimar Republic; Nazi Germany
- Branch: Imperial German Army; Reichswehr; German Army
- Rank: General der Artillerie
- Commands: 132nd Infantry Division
- Conflicts: World War I World War II
- Awards: Knight's Cross of the Iron Cross

Fritz Lindemann (11 April 1894 – 22 September 1944) was a General officer in the Wehrmacht and member of the resistance to Adolf Hitler.

== Career ==
Lindeman was born on 11 April 1894 in Berlin-Charlottenburg, a borough of the capital of the German Empire. His father was the son of Friedrich Lindemann, a military officer. In 1912, Lindemann graduated from the Viktoria-Gymnasium in Potsdam, present-day Helmholtz-Gymnasium Potsdam, receiving his Abitur (university entry qualification) at the top of his class.

Lindemann entered the Royal Prussian Army in 1912. He fought in World War I and, at the end of the war, he was an Oberleutnant. He was awarded the Iron Cross, 1st and 2nd class, among other decorations. On request by the Foreign Minister of Germany, Ulrich von Brockdorff-Rantzau, Lindemann was selected as one of six officers providing security for the German delegation during the negotiation of Treaty of Versailles.

Lindemann participated in the suppression of the German Revolution of 1918–1919 as a member of the Freikorps. However, as a member of the Reichswehr and a loyalist to the Weimar Republic, he refused to participate in the Kapp Putsch. Lindemann served as commander of the 132nd Infantry Division from January 1942 to August 1943, before appointment as Chief of Staff of the Artillery in the Oberkommando des Heeres.

Lindemann developed contacts with conspirators against Adolf Hitler including General Helmuth Stieff, and following the assassination of Hitler it was proposed that he would read the conspirators' proclamation to the German people over the radio, but he did not appear at the Bendlerblock on 20 July 1944 in order to do so.

== Arrest and death ==
Lindemann went into hiding after the failure of the plot, and was deprived of his rank, honours and decorations in absentia and dishonourably discharged from the army on 4 August 1944. A reward of 500,000 Reichsmarks was offered for information leading to his capture, and he was sheltered in Berlin by the architect Erich Gloeden and his wife Elisabeth.

On 3 September 1944 security police officials acting under Kriminalrat Sarde entered the apartment on Reichskanzlerplatz where Lindemann was hiding. He locked himself in a room on the uppermost floor and attempted to climb from a window onto the roof; an official forced part of the door and fired two shots, wounding him in the abdomen and thigh. He was admitted to the State Police Hospital in Scharnhorststrasse the same afternoon, and his treatment was classified as secret.

Surgery established that the colon had been penetrated twice. Lindemann was placed under guard in the surgical unit with his hands bound to the bed, an arrangement relaxed only for washing after the night nurse objected that he could not otherwise be cared for. Peritonitis developed into a general abdominal infection. An abscess was drained without anaesthetic on 13 September, and he was interrogated on several occasions, the last on 21 September. He lost consciousness in the early hours of 22 September and died without recovering it. His body was removed by the Gestapo and his burial place is unknown.

The account of Lindemann's final weeks derives from a report by the physician Charlotte Pommer of the Staatskrankenhaus der Polizei in Berlin, which was passed by Lindemann's family to his former subordinate Gottlob Herbert Bidermann, who published it in his memoir. Pommer's own account was published in 2013.

After standing trial for helping Lindemann at the People's Court, Erich and Elisabeth Gloeden, Hans Sierks and Carl Marks were all sentenced to death. They were executed by guillotine at Plötzensee Prison in September 1944.

== Awards and decorations ==
- Iron Cross (1914)
  - 2nd Class
  - 1st Class
- Hanseatic Cross of Hamburg
- Honour Cross of the World War 1914/1918
- Iron Cross (1939)
  - 2nd Class
  - 1st Class
- Knight's Cross of the Iron Cross on 4 September 1941 as Oberst and Artilleriekommandeur 138. (Note: In absence from the proceedings, the fleeing Lindemann was deprived of all honors, ranks and orders and dishonourably discharged from the Heer on 4 August 1944, in connection with the 20 July plot, the failed attempt to assassinate Adolf Hitler. He died before his case was brought before the Volksgerichtshof (People's Court).)
- German Cross in Gold on 23 August 1942 as Generalmajor and commander of the 132. Infanterie-Division

== Notes ==
Military offices
Preceded by Generalleutnant Rudolf Sintzenich	Commander of 132. Infanterie-Division; 11 January 1942 – 12 August 1943	Succeeded by Generalleutnant Herbert Wagner
