= Gottlob Herbert Bidermann =

German soldier and memoirist (1920–2010)

- Born: 28 August 1920; Stuttgart, Württemberg, Germany
- Died: 1 September 2010 (aged 90); Dornstetten, Freudenstadt, Germany
- Military career
- Allegiance: Nazi Germany
- Branch: German Army
- Service years: 1940–1945
- Rank: Leutnant der Reserve
- Unit: Infantry Regiment 437, 132nd Infantry Division
- Conflicts: World War II; Eastern Front; Crimea campaign; Siege of Sevastopol; Courland Pocket
- Awards: German Cross in Gold; Wound Badge in Gold
- Other work: Memoirist; textile industry

Gottlob Herbert Bidermann (28 August 1920 – 1 September 2010) was a German soldier and memoirist. He served with Infantry Regiment 437 of the 132nd Infantry Division on the Eastern Front from 1941 to 1945, rising from private to lieutenant of reserves, and was decorated with the German Cross in Gold and the Wound Badge in Gold. According to his memoir, he was held roughly 1,000 days in Soviet captivity before returning to Germany in 1948. His memoir appeared in German in 1964 as Krim-Kurland: Mit der 132. Infanterie-Division, 1941–1945 and in English translation in 2000 as In Deadly Combat: A German Soldier's Memoir of the Eastern Front, published by the University Press of Kansas and a main selection of the History Book Club.

== Early life ==
Bidermann was born on 28 August 1920 in Stuttgart, in Württemberg.

== Military service ==
Bidermann served with Infantry Regiment 437—later redesignated Grenadier Regiment 437—of the 132nd Infantry Division in the Soviet Union from 1941 until the end of the war, initially with the regiment's 14th (Anti-Tank) Company and later on battalion staff. He saw action in the Crimea and at the siege of Sevastopol, in the forested fighting south of Leningrad, and finally in the Courland Pocket. According to his memoir, he was wounded five times, on 12 November 1941 and on four occasions in 1944. He rose from Gefreiter through Unteroffizier to Leutnant der Reserve.

== Decorations ==
Bidermann's decorations, in order of award, included:

- Wound Badge in Black – November 1941
- Iron Cross 2nd Class – 30 December 1941
- Iron Cross 1st Class – 31 December 1941
- Infantry Assault Badge – 31 December 1941
- Eastern Front Medal – 1942
- Crimea Shield – 16 December 1942
- Romanian Crusade Against Communism Medal – 1943
- German Cross in Gold – 21 February 1944
- Close Combat Clasp in Bronze – 2 March 1944
- Wound Badge in Silver – 14 April 1944
- Certificate of Recognition of the Commander-in-Chief of the Army – 16 September 1944
- Honour Roll Clasp of the Army – 16 September 1944
- Wound Badge in Gold – 31 October 1944
- Close Combat Clasp in Silver – 25 November 1944
- Tank Destruction Badge in Silver – 2 January 1945, for destroying a T-34 with a Panzerfaust on 12 December 1944
- Courland Cuff Title – 1945

== Captivity and return ==
At the war's end Bidermann entered Soviet captivity. According to his memoir, he was held roughly 1,000 days before returning to his native Württemberg in 1948. His account of the captivity forms the epilogue of his memoir.

== Later life ==
Bidermann later worked in the textile industry. At the time of the English edition of his memoir in 2000 he was retired and living in southern Germany. He died on 1 September 2010 at Dornstetten, in the district of Freudenstadt.

== In Deadly Combat ==
Bidermann's memoir was first published privately in German in 1964 as Krim-Kurland: Mit der 132. Infanterie-Division, 1941–1945. An English edition, translated and edited by Derek S. Zumbro, appeared in 2000 in the University Press of Kansas "Modern War Studies" series under the title In Deadly Combat: A German Soldier's Memoir of the Eastern Front. Zumbro obtained the manuscript from Bidermann directly and expanded the English text with material drawn from interviews with him. The edition carries a preface by Zumbro and an introduction by the military historian Dennis Showalter, and is organised into eleven chronological chapters. It was a main selection of the History Book Club.

== Reception ==
The English edition was well received as a first-person account of the German infantry experience in the East, and was praised for the detail of its battle descriptions and for its portrayal of an ordinary soldier's war.

Scholarly assessment has placed the memoir within the wider historiographical debate over the complicity of the regular German army in wartime atrocities. In his introduction to the English edition, Showalter notes that the memoir does not discuss the role of National Socialism in sustaining German morale in the East, and characterises that silence as unremarkable for an ordinary soldier recalling events decades later. Reviewing the book for H-German in 2004, Oliver Griffin took up the same point at greater length, observing that Bidermann acknowledges atrocities were committed by both sides while professing ignorance of specific German examples, and setting this against the scholarship—notably Omer Bartov’s Hitler's Army—documenting the Wehrmacht's active role in the mass killing of Soviet prisoners and civilians. Griffin nonetheless credited Bidermann's account of Soviet troops with an absence of any assumption of German racial superiority, and concluded that the memoir offers valuable vignettes but should be read alongside scholarly operational and analytical works on the Soviet–German war. Reviewing the book on its release, Publishers Weekly described the translation as "direct and generally graceful, sometimes lyrical," and noted Showalter's observation that firsthand perspectives of German infantrymen are rare; it also remarked that Bidermann describes the "compulsively professional" Wehrmacht subculture without connecting it to the regime's atrocities. The US Army War College journal Parameters called the memoir "a welcome reality check" against the mythologising of Germany's war in the East.
