= Alexis von Roenne =

German Army colonel (1903–1944)

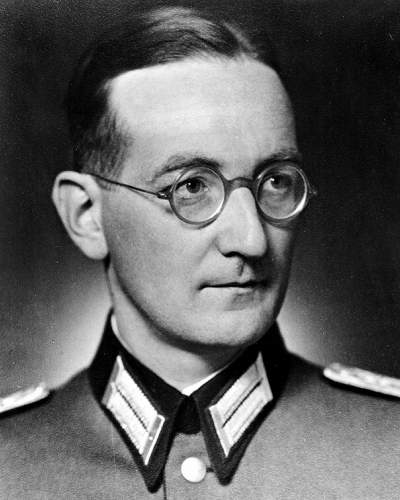
- Born: Alexis von Roenne; 22 February 1903; Tukkum, Courland Governorate, Russian Empire
- Died: 12 October 1944 (aged 41); Plötzensee Prison, Berlin, Nazi Germany
- Cause of death: Execution by hanging
- Spouse: Ursula von Bülow
- Military career
- Allegiance: Nazi Germany; German resistance
- Branch: Wehrmacht
- Service years: 1939–1944
- Rank: Oberst

Alexis Freiherr von Rönne (22 February 1903 – 12 October 1944) was a German Army colonel and senior intelligence analyst. He became one of Hitler's favoured officers in the Abwehr (German military intelligence), despite secretly being of anti-Nazi persuasion.

Later, in the aftermath of the 20 July Plot to assassinate Adolf Hitler, von Roenne was arrested and interrogated by the Gestapo on account of his links with many of the conspirators. Although not directly involved in the plot, he was nonetheless tried and executed.

== Life ==
Von Roenne, who has been referred to by modern historians as 'Hitler's favourite intelligence analyst', rose through German intelligence to head Foreign Armies West (Fremde Heere West), the branch of the Abwehr tasked with espionage on the Western Front.

However, von Roenne was a staunch Christian with beliefs at odds with the Nazi Party. Historians believe that he led a double life by deliberately misleading Hitler and the German general staff. Von Roenne promoted as valid secret intelligence that he clearly suspected to have been planted through Allied deception. In particular, he persuaded Hitler to accept intelligence gained from British campaigns like Operation Mincemeat, the deception plan for the Allied invasion of Sicily (see below), and Operation Bodyguard, disguising the intended target of the Normandy landings. Von Roenne's actions would have helped to save thousands of Allied lives by diverting Axis and Nazi forces away from the true sites of the planned beach landings.

== Death ==
Arrested in the immediate aftermath of the 20 July plot, because of his connection with several of those responsible, but released shortly afterwards, von Roenne was rearrested on 9 August and tried before Roland Freisler's People's Court on 5 October. Declaring that Nazi race policies were inconsistent with his Christian values, he was found guilty in a show trial and hanged on a meat hook at Plötzensee Prison on 12 October 1944. His final epitaph to his wife, Ursula von Bülow, reflected his faith, stating "in a moment now I shall be going home to our Lord in complete calm and in the certainty of salvation".

== Operation Mincemeat ==
Author Ben Macintyre's 2010 book Operation Mincemeat, provides additional specifics about the involvement of von Roenne in the ruse played on the Germans during the Second World War by the British. Forged documents claimed that the Allies would invade Greece and Sardinia before the invasion of Sicily, leading Germany to divert important assets to that area. The Baron was said to have vouched for the authenticity of the documents and also accepted other hoaxes used by the Allies during the war.

According to Macintyre,

he faithfully passed on every deception ruse fed to him, accepted the existence of every bogus unit regardless of evidence, and inflated forty-four divisions in Britain to an astonishing eighty-nine.

Macintyre would suggest the view that von Roenne was not actually "duped", saying:

Von Roenne ... may have chosen to believe the fake documents for an entirely different reason: because he loathed Hitler, wanted to undermine the Nazi war effort, and was intent on passing false information to the high command in the certain knowledge that it was wholly false and extremely damaging.

A report published by The Independent adds additional perspective on von Roenne's work during the war.

Colonel Baron Alexis von Roenne, in charge of Fremde Heere West (FHW), the western intelligence arm, who had built his reputation on predicting Allied behaviour early in the war, was wrong on almost every important count other than to discount an invasion of Norway. He was fooled by the fantasy invasion of the Pas-de-Calais and was convinced that the fictitious British Fourth Army in Scotland existed and was about to be redeployed to Kent.

== See also ==
- German resistance to Nazism
- List of members of the 20 July plot
