= Elisabeth Charlotte Gloeden =

German resistance fighter (1875–1962)

Rose Schlösinger
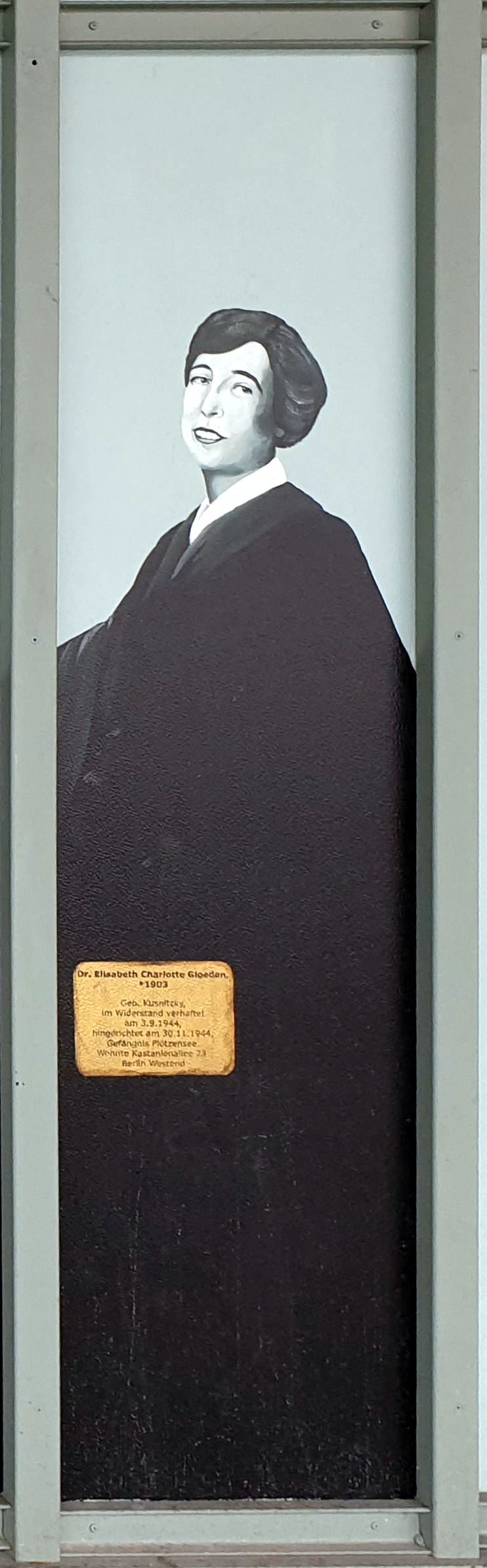
- A 2022 painting of Gloeden by Ulrike Pusch
- Born: Elisabeth Charlotte Kuznitzky; 9 December 1903; Cologne, Germany
- Died: 30 November 1944 (aged 40); Plötzensee Prison; Berlin, Nazi Germany
- Cause of death: Decapitation
- Monuments: Several Stolperstein placed in her honour
- Education: University of Cologne
- Occupations: Resistance member, lawyer
- Known for: Participation in the failed 20 July 1944 plot to assassinate Hitler
- Spouse: Erich Gloeden (m. 1938)

Elisabeth Charlotte Gloeden (December 9, 1903 - November 30, 1944), also known as "Lilo" or Liselotte, was a German lawyer and resistance fighter during the Nazi regime.

== Early life ==
Born Elisabeth Charlotte Kuznitzky in Cologne, Gloeden studied law at the Ludwig-Maximilians-Universität München (LMU) in Munich. She earned her doctorate in 1928 from the University of Cologne, specializing in German nobility law. Gloeden worked as a court clerk and married architect Erich Gloeden in 1938.

== Resistance activities ==
During World War II, the Gloedens secretly opposed the Nazi regime and provided shelter to Jewish people fleeing persecution. They helped many Jewish acquaintances and relatives survive in hiding. After the failed 20 July 1944 plot to assassinate Hitler, the Gloedens took in General Fritz Lindemann, who was being hunted by the Gestapo for his involvement in the conspiracy. They hid him in their Berlin-Westend apartment, passing him off as a retired major and journalist named Exner.

== Arrest and execution ==
On September 3, 1944, the Gestapo raided the Gloedens' home, capturing Lindemann and arresting Lilo, Erich, and Lilo's mother, Elisabeth Kuznitzky. The three were brought before the People's Court on November 27, 1944, in a widely publicized trial for treason. Despite Erich's attempts to protect his wife and mother-in-law by claiming sole responsibility, both women confessed to knowing Lindemann's identity. As a result, all three were sentenced to death and executed by guillotine on November 30, 1944, at Plötzensee Prison in Berlin.

== Legacy ==
The Gloedens and Elisabeth Kuznitzky are memorialized by three bronze Stolpersteine (stumbling stones) installed outside their former apartment in Berlin.

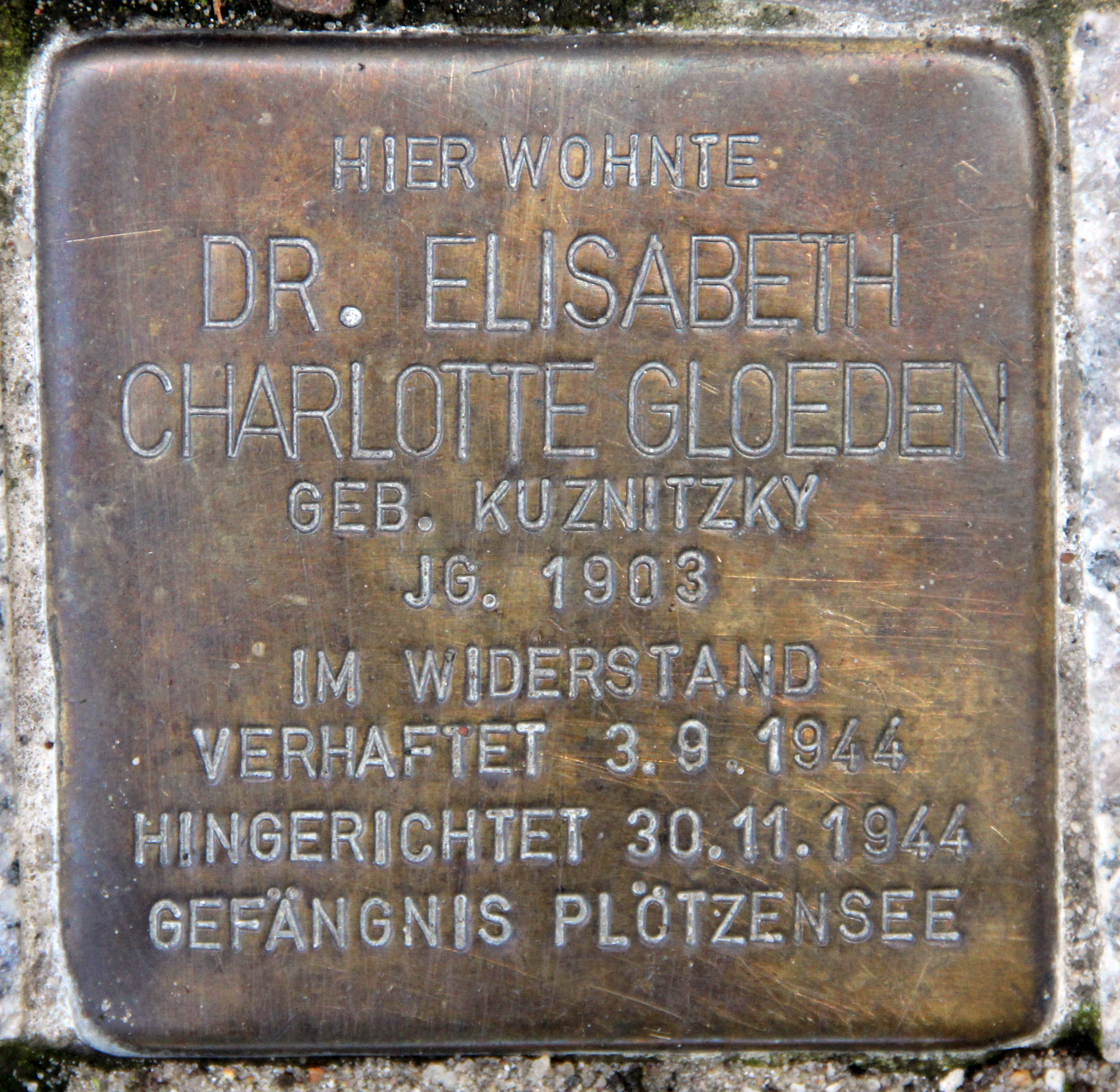
Stumbling stone of Elisabeth Charlotte Gloeden, Kastanienallee 23, Berlin-Westend

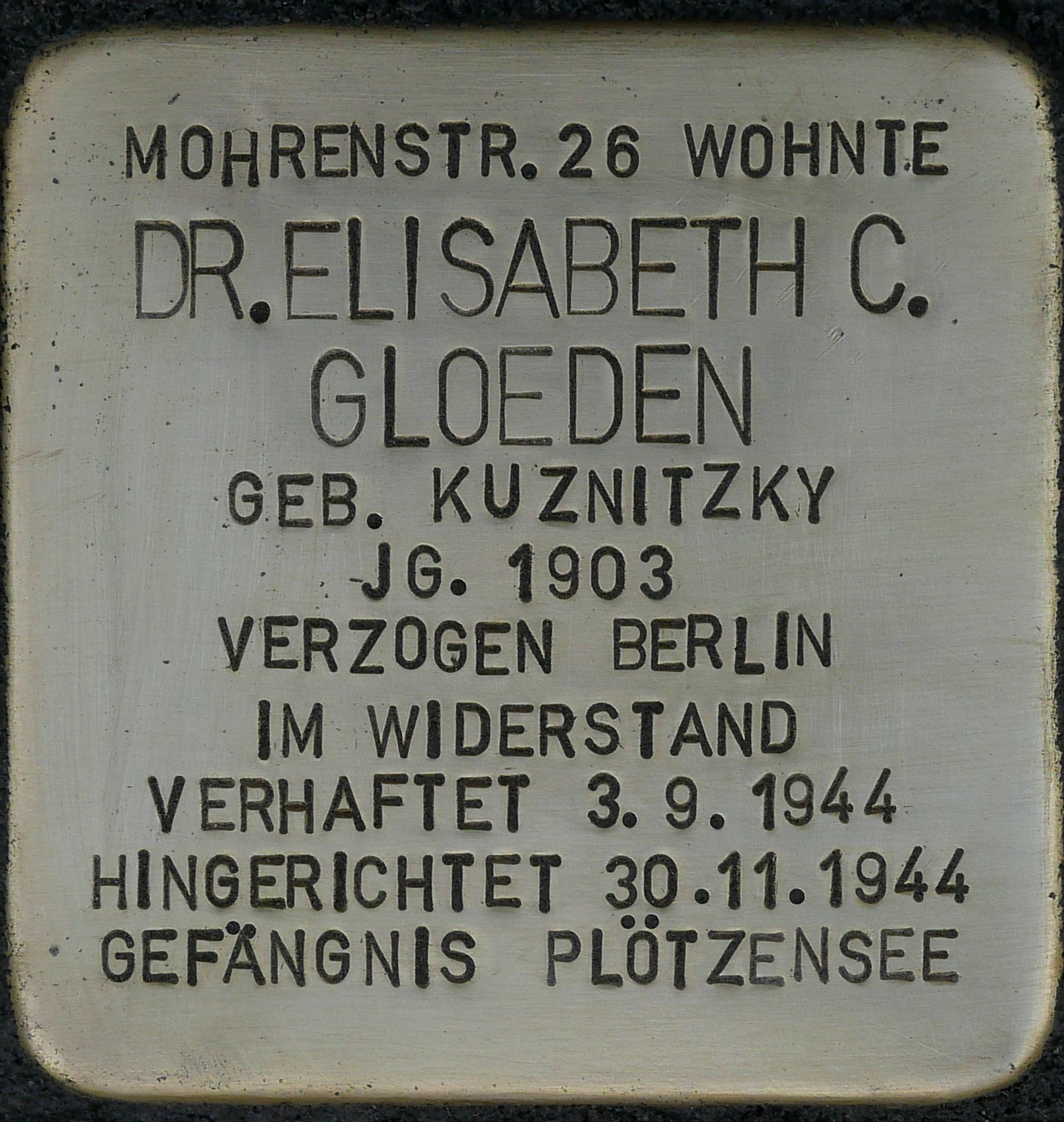
Stumbling stone of Elisabeth Charlotte Gloeden, Mohrenstraße 26 Köln-Altstadt-Nord

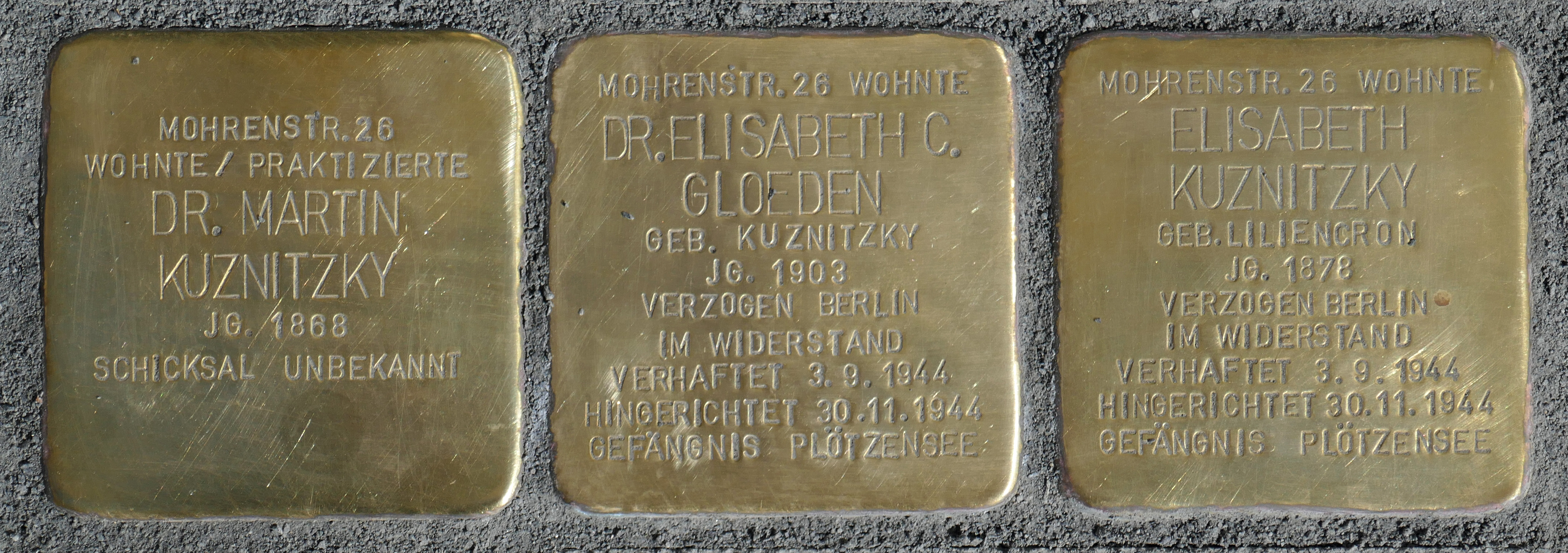
Stumbling stones of the Kuznitzky family, Mohrenstraße 26 Köln-Altstadt-Nord

== See also ==
- 20 July plot
- Resistance during World War II
