= Kevin Li =

Kevin Li may refer to:

- Kevin Li (badminton) (born 1986), Canadian badminton player
- Kevin K. Li (born 1978), Canadian television producer
- Li Zhenning (born 1995), or Kevin Li Zhenning, Chinese singer and actor
- Kris Wu (born 1990), formerly known as Kevin Li, Canadian rapper

== See also ==
- Kevin Lee (disambiguation)
