= Dusky Peril =

Anti-Indian slur

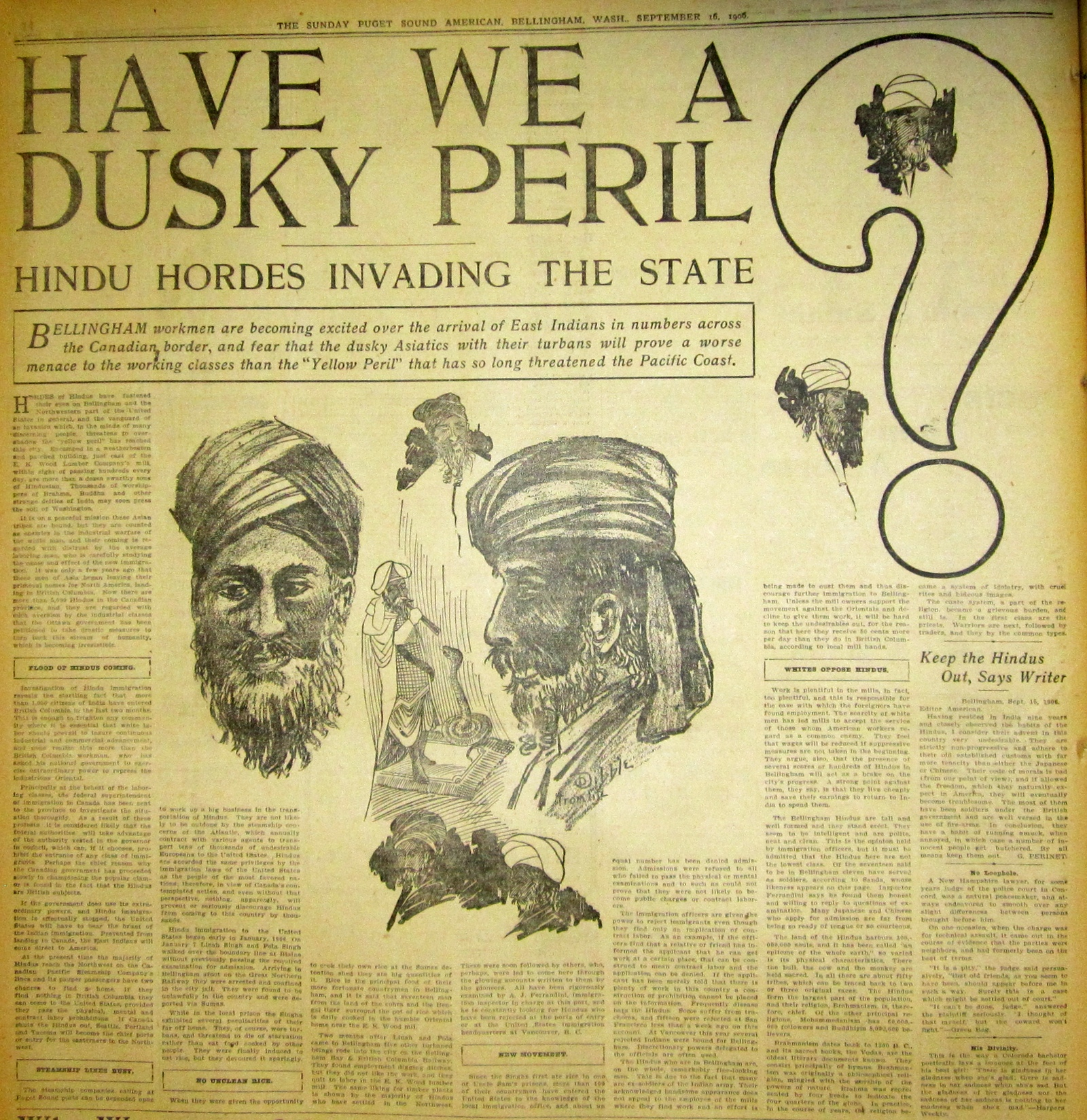
An article from the September 16, 1906, Puget Sound American describing recent "Hindu" immigration to Bellingham, Washington.

Dusky Peril was a term used in a full page article in the Puget Sound American, a daily newspaper from Bellingham, Washington, in its 16 September 1906 issue. The term was used to describe the immigration of what it described as "Hindus" to the area,

At the time, it was considered similar to the term Yellow Peril, an expression which was used by advocates of the ethnocentrism, racism and xenophobia which were all practiced in white and non-white countries across the globe. The term is analysed to have both an ethnic and a religious dimension. In fact, most of the immigrants from Punjab, India were Sikhs. The article is in response to the immigration of 17 individuals to the town. The article's headline is "Have we a Dusky Peril: Hindu hordes invading the state" with the byline, "Bellingham workmen are becoming excited over the arrival of East Indians in numbers across the Canadian border and fear that the dusky Asiatics with their turbans will prove a worse menace to the working classes than the 'Yellow Peril' that has so long threatened the Pacific Coast."

== South Asian-American reaction ==
Shefali Chandan writing in Jano conjectures that the emotions behind the circumstances that led to the ethnic cleansing of Bellingham in 1907, in which white mobs went door to door to locate East Indian immigrants and forced their expulsion, resulting in the entire community numbering about 200 or 300 leaving the town for good, found expression in the feature article written a year before. Similarly, Rajan Gill discusses how the fear of the immigrants and racial prejudice depicted in the 1906 article culminated in the mob violence that occurred in Bellingham and throughout the Pacific Northwest. The New York Times connected the anti-Sikh "hysteria" in the early 1900s exemplified by the views in the "dusky peril" article with the 2012 killing of six people in a Sikh temple in Wisconsin, and noted that prejudice continues to be faced by Sikhs serving as elected officials.
