= HBICtv: Ultra Rich Asian Girls =

- Also known as: Ultra Rich Asian Girls
- Genre: Reality television
- Created by: Kevin K. Li
- Country of origin: Canada

Production
- Production company: HBICtv

HBICtv: Ultra Rich Asian Girls (Chinese: 公主我最大; pinyin: Gōngzhǔ wǒ zuìdà) was a Canadian reality television web series created in 2014, featuring daughters of Chinese Canadians living in Vancouver, British Columbia, Canada. It ran for 3 seasons on YouTube, broadcast in Mandarin and English for a Chinese-speaking audience.

Promoted as akin to Keeping Up with the Kardashians, Crazy Rich Asians, and The Real Housewives, the show follows ultra-wealthy Chinese immigrants in Vancouver, travelling with them across various cities.

The show averaged a 4.6/10 rating on IMDb, and was criticised for its heavy promotion and "flaunting of wealth", with critics stating its premise promotes misogyny, interracial tensions, and racial stereotypes.

== Premise ==
Desmond Chen served as an executive producer and co-producer of the series.Li, creator and producer, was born and raised in Vancouver's working-class Eastside. He stated his reason for creating the show was witnessing the demographic shift of the city's 400,000 Chinese community.

The show's cast was promoted as "having fun, spending daddy's money... enjoying life and funding an economy", following them in their daily lives. The show examines the new-money class of fuerdai, Chinese "rich second generation", who provoke reactions of both "envy and censure" for their patterns of conspicuous consumption.

== Reviews & Criticism ==
Peter Guy of the South China Morning Post called the show a "case study in how not to flaunt wealth," citing the anonymous quote "You show me a highly unequal society and I'll show you a revolution or a police state."

The show Ultra Rich Asian Girls features a cultural drama, examining Chinese identity amongst second-generation immigrants, and how this relates to wealth, gender, and social relations.

Additionally, the show touches on Sinophobic sentiments towards Chinese immigrants in North America, and issues regarding extreme capital concentration in a communist nation like China.

The show averaged a 4.6/10 rating on IMDb, with public reactions regarding the cast as "Chinese version of trailer park trash," asking to "take their money somewhere else". Additionally, the web series was criticised as "boring and unoriginal", alongside heavy promotion and "flaunting of wealth", with critics stating its premise promotes misogyny, interracial tensions, and racial stereotypes.

The show also resulted in the 're-launch' of Ultra Hard Working and Not Rich Asians of Vancouver, a documentary also produced by Li, focusing on impoverished Asian immigrants.

== Casting ==
=== Season 1 ===
==== Chelsea Jiang ====
Chelsea was born in Ottawa, Ontario, Canada. She studied in private schools in Beijing from the time she was seven years old until she was fourteen, and graduated from the Honour Math program at the University of British Columbia. She wants to enter fashion and run her own business: a clothing line called "C3", standing for "Choice, Change and Challenge".

==== Flo.Z (Florence) ====
Florence, a graduate in of fashion design at the Istituto Marangoni in Milan, wished to be an entrepreneur and runs her own fashion line, "Flo.Z".

==== Coco Paris ====
Nineteen-year-old Coco is Taiwanese and aspires to become an entertainer. Studying musical instruments since seven; she can play the guzheng, flute, drum, and violin.

==== Joy ====
Joy is an international student focusing on fashion marketing. She walked her first runway show in September 2014 and showed up during the Opening Gala of Vancouver Fashion Week in Summer 2015. Her goal is to become a model.

=== Season 2 ===
==== Chelsea Jiang ====
Chelsea returned for season 2, with the show focusing on her pregnancy and subsequent new lifestyle.

==== Weymi ====
Weymi has since graduated from Blanche Macdonald with a Fashion Marketing degree. Her parents gave her half a million dollars, and she plans to launch a bilingual luxury-lifestyle magazine.

==== Pam ====
Pam is the Founder of PLY Talent Management, a local modelling agency. She also started a flower business, Concept Floral Vancouver.

==== Ray ====
Ray holds a degree in Finance and Marketing from the Sauder School of Business at the University of British Columbia. She has started Rono Marketing Group Ltd.

==== Diana ====
Diana is a student at the University of British Columbia and speaks English, Chinese, Korean, and Japanese. She seeks to create and roll out a real estate app.

== Series list ==
=== Season 1 ===
Episode	Title	Airing Date	Location
1	Ultra Rich Asian Girls	Oct.26, 2014	Vancouver
2	Opium War	Nov.2, 2014	Victoria
3	Sleeping with Frenemy 1	Nov.9, 2014	Flo's private island
4	Sleeping with Frenemy 2	Nov.16, 2014	Flo's private island
5	Italy Shoppiccino	Nov.23, 2014	Venice
6	Italy - Tiramisu	Nov.30, 2014	Milan
7	Coco's Way	Dec.7, 2014	Italy; Vancouver
8	Finale	Dec.14, 2014	Nerves della Battaglia; Vancouver
Bonus	URAG Bonus	Aug.30, 2015	Vancouver

=== Season 2 ===
Episode	Title	Airing Date	Location
1	Growing Pains	Sep.13, 2015	Vancouver
2	Regulated	Sep.20, 2015	Los Angeles
3	Startup	Sep.27, 2015	Vancouver
4	Business Card Girls	Oct.4, 2015	New Mexico
5	$8 Baller	Oct.11, 2015	Vancouver
6	Elephant in the Room	Oct.18, 2015	Vancouver

=== Season 3 ===
Episode	Title	Airing Date	Location
