= Kevin Lee (disambiguation) =

Kevin Lee is an American mixed martial artist.

Kevin Lee may also refer to:

- Kevin Lee (American football) (born 1971), American football player
- Kevin Lee (swimmer) (born 1961), British swimmer
- Kevin Lee (badminton) (born 1998), Canadian badminton player
- Kevin Lee (political aide), British political aide

== See also ==
- Kevin Ridger, English actor formerly known as Kevin Lee
- Kevin Li (disambiguation)
