= Red Chinese Battle Plan =

- Produced by: United States Department of Defense
- Release date: 1967
- Running time: 28 minutes
- Country: United States
- Language: English

Red Chinese Battle Plan is a 28-minute black-and-white propaganda short produced by the United States Department of Defense in 1967. Presented as a documentary film on Chinese history to military servicemen, the propaganda short describes the People's Republic of China as plotting to "conquer and enslave" the world.

== Overview ==
Produced five years before the beginning of the United States' rapprochement with Mao Zedong in 1972, Red Chinese Battle Plan was made during the Vietnam War under the Lyndon Johnson administration. Despite the widening rift between the China and the Soviet Union, both powers supported the Vietnamese communists during the Indochina conflict, while the Western Bloc cultivated a myth of Chinese expansionism throughout the decade.

The film traces the political philosophy of Mao Zedong to the time of the building of the Great Wall, a period described in the film as an era of "slave labor and thought control." The film's anonymous narrator accuses the People's Republic of China of trying to "conquer and enslave" the planet.

== See also ==
- Yellow Peril
- List of American films of 1967
