= Kevin K. Li =

Kevin K. Li (born June 2, 1978, in Vancouver, British Columbia), is of Chinese descent. Li is a television producer who created HBICtv: Ultra Rich Asian Girls, Brotherhoods Clans and Secret Societies of Vancouver's Chinatown, Azn Lifestyles TV and TV Fusion.

== Early career and education ==
Li attended BCIT in 1996, majoring in television broadcasting. In 1997, Li volunteered as a camera assistant at Daytime, Rogers Community Channel. The first interview he shot was with Michael Bublé at Babulu's, before Bublé became famous. In 1998, Li worked for Fairchild Television as a news producer in the News and Current Affairs department, where it won a Jack Webster Award for "Best Chinese Reporting" for their documentary series, Above and Beyond.

== Identities ==
A big part of Li’s life is Chinese Canadian culture and history. He produced Brotherhoods, Clans, and Secret Societies of Vancouver's Chinatown in 2011, an hour-long documentary fully funded by the Roger's Independent Producers Initiative.

In 2015, after producing Season 2 of HBICtv: Ultra Rich Asian Girls, Li moved on to produce House My Style, a 13-episode docu-reality series that aired on Omni TV in Canada.

Li experienced racism while attending high school in Vancouver. It is with this experience that he began to embrace his heritage rather than hiding it. Li learned martial arts, lion dancing, and Chinese-Canadian history at Hon Hsing Athletic Association. Li also learned Mandarin at Beijing Language and Culture University.

From 2000 to 2010, Kevin witnessed the demographics of the city's 400,000-strong Chinese community shift. He grew up with second-generation Hong Kong immigrants like himself, then noticed another generation of people flowing into Vancouver - ones who were more affluent with much more money to spend. With his curiosity, Li created HBICtv: Ultra Rich Asian Girls in 2014, to fight the model minority stereotype and tackle the renewed yellow peril sentiments in the Mainland Chinese living in North America today. The show features a group of pretty and dazzling Mandarin-speaking girls and show their daily life: shop, dine, and attend social functions. The show offers a unique perspective towards the lives of ultra-rich Asian girls, and provides information for case study about Chinese immigrants into Canadian society - where do they come from, why do they come to North America, what are their lives like, what are they pursuing.

== Career ==
Li has worked for City TV, CTV, and Olympic Broadcasting Services during the Rio de Janeiro, London, Singapore, and Vancouver Olympic Games. Li is currently a Member of the Board of Directors at Vancouver Asian Film Festival.
