= Techno-Orientalism =

Cultural theory

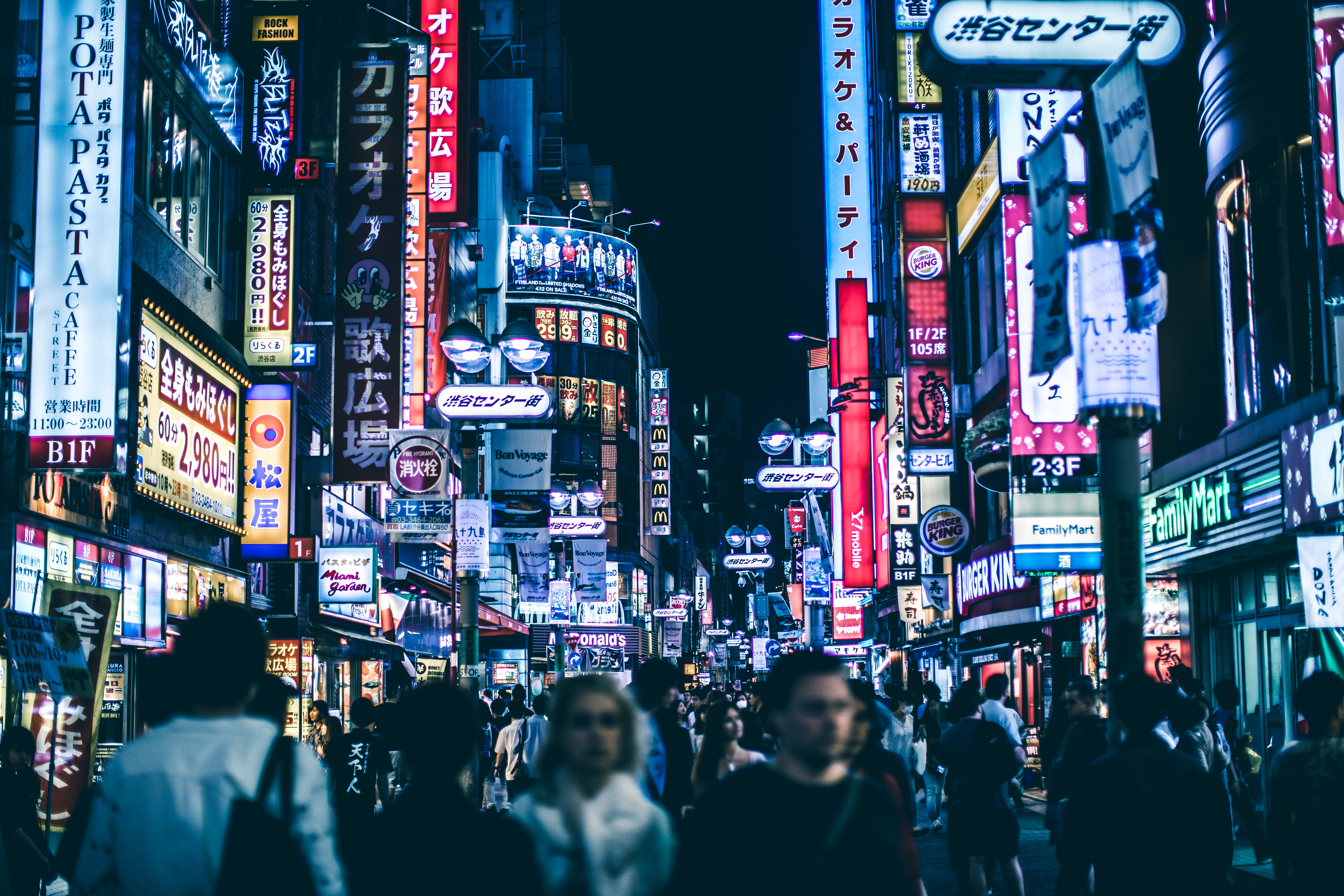
Shibuya in Tokyo, Japan. Tokyo is one of the cities described by the authors of Techno-Orientalism: Imagining Asia in Speculative Fiction, History, and Media (2019) as places where speculative fiction bases its visions of the future while perpetuating "the stereotype of Asians as both technologically advanced and intellectually primitive".

Techno-Orientalism is a cultural theory critiquing the depiction of Asia and Asian culture as hyper-technologized within literature, media, and various cultural work. Films and novels in the genre of cyberpunk are frequently cited for fetishizing Asian aesthetics, setting futuristic fiction in Asian landscapes, and portraying Asia as a place of advanced technology while simultaneously depicting it as cold, dystopian, and dehumanized.

The term 'Techno-Orientalism' was first defined in Morley and Robins's Spaces of Identity: Global Media, Electronic Landscapes, and Cultural Boundaries published in 1995.

While Orientalism perceives the Eastern world as inferior through a primitive and undeveloped lens, Techno-Orientalism represents Asia as a technologically advanced, futuristic entity. However, this depiction of a hyper-technologized Asia is rooted in the Western fear of Eastern modernization as it poses a threat to the West's contention for global dominance.

== Origins ==
Techno-Orientalism is derivative of Edward Said's concept of Orientalism, where the "Orient" exists as the alienation of the East by the West. By combining the Middle East with the Far East as a single description of "Oriental" despite their cultural, linguistic, and religious differences, the West is able to distinguish itself from that region of the world. In this context, the "Orient" becomes synonymous with "other".

The term Techno-Orientalism is first coined in 1995 by Morley and Robins in their book Spaces of Identity: Global Media, Electronic Landscapes, and Cultural Boundaries. In chapter 8, the essay "Techno-Orientalism: Japan Panic", the phrase is used to describe how the expansion of Japanese economics, politics, and cultural influence becomes a source of anxiety for the West in the twentieth century.

Morley argues that American anxieties stem from Japan's increasing technological advancements after World War II. While the West harbors Anti-Japanese sentiments and continued to view Japan through an "exotic" lens, Japan increasingly incorporated patterns and technologies of the West into their culture. Due to globalism, the West sees Japan's cultural and technological absorption as a threat to their authority. Morley describes this as a "panic" over Japan's technological advances, as Western correspondences could no longer simply equate the West as "modern" and the East as "pre-modern". Japan's rise in political and cultural power destabilized the West's perspective of what geographic regions define "modernization" and where the United States stands as a global superpower.

The West, associating Japan with high-technology, creates fantastical narratives of technologies of the future. Morley refers to this as "techno-mythology", where this fictionalized world of highly advanced artificial intelligence, robots, and machines becomes synonymous to the development of Japan. This perception from the West romanticizes and fears Japan as a place of technological innovation.

== Applications in media and culture ==
Techno-Orientalism is prominently depicted in cyberpunk fiction. Notable pieces of science fiction media critiqued for Techno-Orientalism include Ridley Scott's Blade Runner, the Wachowski Sisters' The Matrix, and William Gibson's Neuromancer.
