= Yellow Peril =

Racist color metaphor

The Yellow Peril (also the Yellow Terror, the Yellow Menace, and the Yellow Specter) is a racist color metaphor that depicts the peoples of East Asia as an existential danger to the Western world.

The concept of the Yellow Peril developed during the 19th century as Western imperialist expansion adduced East Asians as the Yellow Peril. In the late 19th century, the Russian sociologist Jacques Novicow coined the term in the essay "Le Péril Jaune" ("The Yellow Peril", 1897), which Kaiser Wilhelm II (r. 1888–1918) used to encourage the European empires to invade, conquer, and colonize China. To that end, using the Yellow Peril ideology, the Kaiser portrayed the Japanese and the Asian victory against the Russians in the Russo-Japanese War (1904–1905) as an Asian racial threat to white Western Europe, and also exposes China and Japan as an alliance to conquer, subjugate, and enslave the Western world.

The sinologist Wing-Fai Leung explained the origins of the term and the racist ideology: "The phrase yellow peril (sometimes yellow terror or yellow specter) ... blends Western anxieties about sex, racist fears of the alien Other, and the Spenglerian belief that the West will become outnumbered and enslaved by the East." The academic Gina Marchetti identified the psycho-cultural fear of East Asians as "rooted in medieval fears of Genghis Khan and the Mongol invasions of Europe [1236–1291], the Yellow Peril combines racist terror of alien cultures, sexual anxieties, and the belief that the West will be overpowered and enveloped, by the irresistible, dark, occult forces of the East"; hence, to oppose Japanese imperial militarism, the West expanded the Yellow Peril ideology to include the Japanese people. Moreover, in the late-19th and early-20th centuries, writers developed the Yellow Peril literary topos into codified, racialist motifs of narration, especially in stories and novels of ethnic conflict in the genres of invasion literature, adventure fiction, and science fiction.

== Origins ==
Europe was used to "peril". Before 1700, according to Edward Said:

Not for nothing did Islam come to symbolize terror, devastation, the demonic, hordes of hated barbarians. For Europe, Islam was a lasting trauma. Until the end of the seventeenth century the "Ottoman peril" lurked alongside Europe to represent for the whole of Christian civilization a constant danger, and in time European civilization incorporated that peril and its lore, its great events.

Although the term "Yellow Peril" originated in French and German in the 1890s, the cultural stereotypes of the Yellow Peril originated in the 1870s when Chinese workers legally immigrated to Australia, Canada, the U.S., and New Zealand. Their work ethic provoked a backlash against Chinese communities, for agreeing to work for lower wages than did the local white populations. In 1870, the French Orientalist and historian Ernest Renan warned Europeans of Eastern danger to the Western world; yet Renan had meant not China but the Russian Empire (1721–1917), a country and nation whom the West perceived as more Asiatic than European.

=== United States ===
In 1854, the famous editor of the New-York Tribune, Horace Greeley published "Chinese Immigration to California." This editorial demanded the exclusion of Chinese workers and people from the new state of California. Without using the term "yellow peril," Greeley compared the arriving "coolies" to the African slaves who survived the Middle Passage. He praised the few Christians among the arriving Chinese and continued:

But of the remainder, what can be said? They are for the most part an industrious people, forbearing and patient of injury, quiet and peaceable in their habits; say this and you have said all good that can be said of them. They are uncivilized, unclean, and filthy beyond all conception, without any of the higher domestic or social relations; lustful and sensual in their dispositions; every female is a prostitute of the basest order; the first words of English that they learn are terms of obscenity or profanity, and beyond this they care to learn no more.

— New York Daily Tribune, Chinese Immigration to California, 29 September 1854, p. 4.

In 1870s California the native white working-class demanded that the U.S. government cease the immigration of "filthy yellow hordes" of Chinese people who took jobs from native-born white-Americans, especially during an economic depression. In Los Angeles, Yellow Peril racism provoked the Chinese massacre of 1871, wherein 500 white men lynched 20 Chinese men in the Chinatown ghetto. Throughout the 1870s and 1880s, the leader of the Workingmen's Party of California, the demagogue Denis Kearney, successfully applied Yellow Peril ideology to his politics against the press, capitalists, politicians, and Chinese workers, and concluded his speeches with the epilogue: "and whatever happens, the Chinese must go!"

The Chinese people also were specifically subjected to moralistic panics about their use of opium, and how their use made opium popular among white people. The mainstream press misrepresented Asian peoples as culturally subversive, whose way of life would diminish republicanism in the U.S.; hence, racist political pressure compelled the U.S. government to legislate the Chinese Exclusion Act (1882), which remained the effective immigration-law until 1943. The act was the first U.S. immigration law to target a specific ethnicity or nationality. Moreover, following the example of Kaiser Wilhelm II's use of the term in 1895, the popular press in the U.S. adopted the phrase "yellow peril" to identify Japan as a military threat, and to warn against emigrants from Asia.

=== Imperial Germany ===
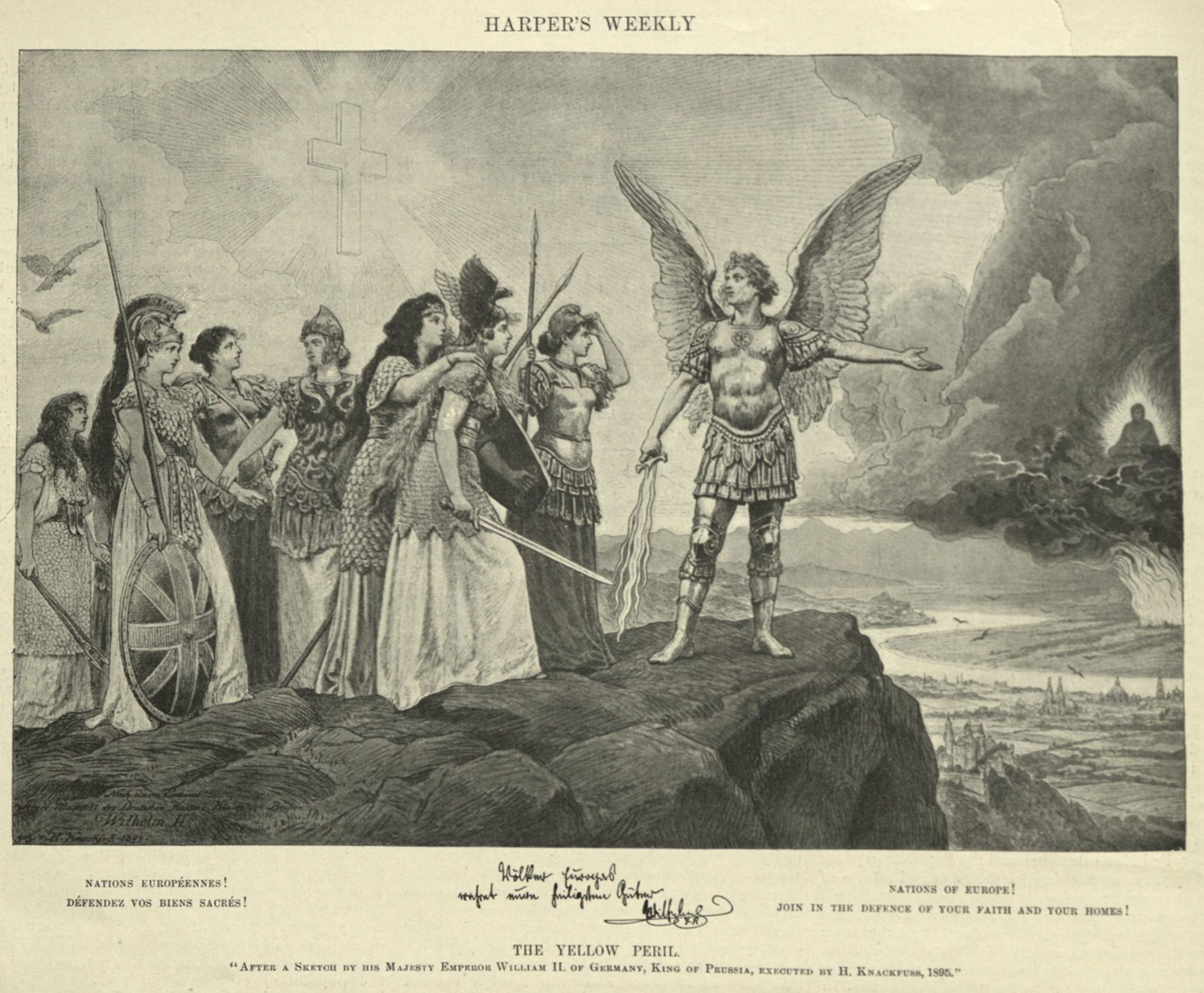
Kaiser Wilhelm II used the allegorical lithograph Peoples of Europe, Guard Your Most Sacred Possessions (1895), by Hermann Knackfuss, to promote Yellow Peril ideology as geopolitical justification for European colonialism in East Asia.

The Yellow Peril ideology gave concrete form to the anti-East Asian racism of Europe, especially Germany and Russia. In central Europe, the Orientalist and diplomat Max von Brandt advised Kaiser Wilhelm II that Imperial Germany had colonial interests to pursue in China. Hence, the Kaiser in 1897 used the phrase die Gelbe Gefahr (The Yellow Peril) to specifically encourage Imperial German interests and justify European colonialism in China.

In 1895, Germany, France, and Russia staged the Triple Intervention to the Treaty of Shimonoseki (17 April 1895), which concluded the First Sino-Japanese War (1894–1895), in order to compel Imperial Japan to surrender their Chinese colonies to the Europeans; that geopolitical gambit became an underlying cause of the Russo-Japanese War (1904–05). The Kaiser justified the Triple Intervention to the Japanese empire with racialist calls-to-arms against nonexistent geopolitical dangers of the yellow race against the white race of Western Europe.

To justify European cultural hegemony, the Kaiser used the allegorical lithograph Peoples of Europe, Guard Your Most Sacred Possessions (1895), by Hermann Knackfuss, to communicate his geopolitics to other European monarchs. The lithograph depicts Germany as the leader of Europe, personified as a "prehistoric warrior-goddesses being led by the Archangel Michael against the 'yellow peril' from the East", which is represented by "dark cloud of smoke [upon] which rests an eerily calm Buddha, wreathed in flame". Politically, the Knackfuss lithograph allowed Kaiser Wilhelm II to believe he prophesied the imminent race war that would decide global hegemony in the 20th century.

=== Imperial Russia ===
In the late 19th century, with the Treaty of Saint Petersburg, the Qing dynasty (1644–1912) China recovered the eastern portion of the Ili River basin (Zhetysu), which Russia had occupied for a decade, since the Dungan Revolt. In that time, the mass communications media of the West misrepresented China as an ascendant military power, and applied Yellow Peril ideology to evoke racist fears that China would conquer Western colonies, such as Australia.

Imperial Russian writers, notably symbolists, expressed fears of a "second Tatar yoke" or a "Mongolian wave" following the lines of "Yellow Peril". Vladimir Solovyov combined Japan and China into supposed "Pan-Mongolians" who would conquer Russia and Europe. A similar idea and fear was expressed by Dmitry Merezhkovskii in Zheltolitsye pozitivisty ("Yellow-Faced Positivists") in 1895 and Griadushchii Kham ("The Coming Boor") in 1906.

The works of explorer Vladimir K. Arsenev also illustrated the ideology of Yellow Peril in Tsarist Russia. The fear continued into the Soviet era where it contributed to the Soviet internal deportation of Koreans. In a 1928 report to the Dalkrai Bureau, Arsenev stated "Our colonization is a type of weak wedge on the edge of the primordial land of the yellow peoples." In the earlier 1914 monograph The Chinese in the Ussuri Region, Arsenev characterized people of three East Asian nationalities (Koreans, Chinese, and Japanese) as a singular 'yellow peril', criticizing immigration to Russia and presenting the Ussuri region as a buffer against "onslaught".

=== Canada ===
The Chinese head tax was a fixed fee charged to each Chinese person entering Canada. The head tax was first levied after the Canadian parliament passed the Chinese Immigration Act of 1885 and was meant to discourage Chinese people from entering Canada after the completion of the Canadian Pacific Railway (CPR). The tax was abolished by the Chinese Immigration Act of 1923, which outright prevented all Chinese immigration except for that of business people, clergy, educators, students, and some others.

== Boxer Rebellion ==
In 1900, the anticolonial Boxer Rebellion (August 1899 – September 1901) reinforced the racist stereotypes of East Asians as a Yellow Peril to white people. The Society of the Righteous and Harmonious Fists (called the Boxers in the West) was an anticolonial martial arts organization who blamed the problems of China on the presence of Western colonies in China proper. The Boxers sought to save China by killing Westerners in China and Chinese Christians or Westernized people. In the early summer of 1900, Prince Zaiyi allowed the Boxers into Beijing to kill Westerners and Chinese Christians in siege to the foreign legations. Afterward, Qing Commander-in-Chief Ronglu and Yikuang (Prince Qing), resisted and expelled the Boxers from Beijing after days of fighting.

=== Western perception ===
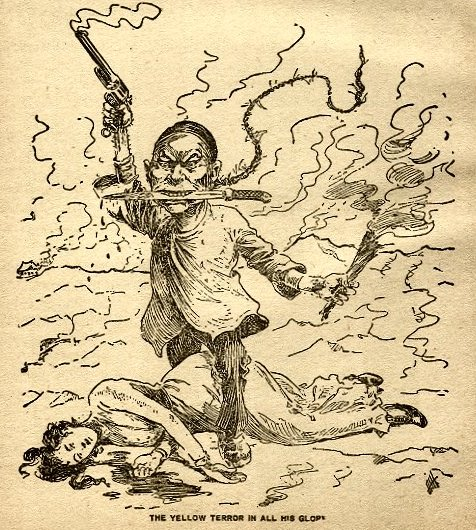
The Yellow Terror in all His Glory, an 1899 British editorial cartoon depicting a Chinese Boxer standing over a fallen white woman. The Chinese man represents the anti-colonial Boxer movement and the woman represents Christian missionaries attacked by Boxers during the Boxer Rebellion.

Most of the victims of the Boxer Rebellion were Chinese Christians, In response to the massacre, United Kingdom, the United States, and Imperial Japan, Imperial France, Imperial Russia, and Imperial Germany, Austria–Hungary and Italy formed the Eight-Nation Alliance and dispatched an international military expeditionary force to end the Siege of the International Legations in Beijing.

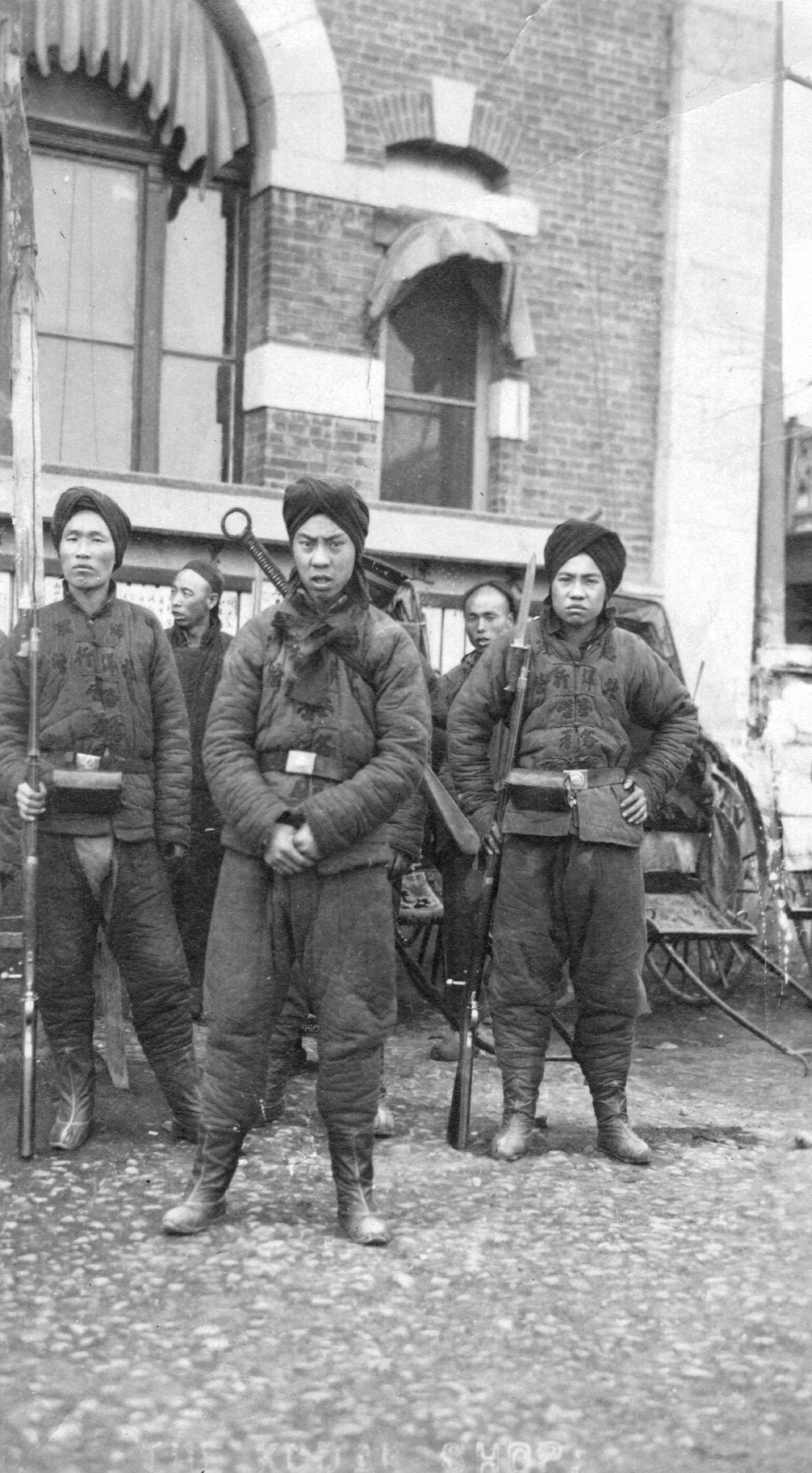
Yellow Peril xenophobia arose from the armed revolt of the Society of the Righteous and Harmonious Fists (the Boxers) to expel all Westerners from China, during the Boxer Rebellion (August 1899 – September 1901)

The Russian press presented the Boxer Rebellion in racialist and religious terms as a cultural war between White Holy Russia and Yellow Pagan China. The press further supported the Yellow Peril apocalypse with quotations from the Sinophobic poems of the philosopher Vladimir Solovyov.

In the Western world, news of Boxer atrocities against Westerners in China provoked Yellow Peril racism in Europe and North America, where the Chinese' rebellion was perceived as a race war between the yellow race and the white race. In that vein, The Economist magazine warned in 1905:

The history of the Boxer movement contains abundant warnings, as to the necessity of an attitude of constant vigilance, on the part of the European Powers, when there are any symptoms that a wave of nationalism is about to sweep over the Celestial Empire.

=== Colonial vengeance ===
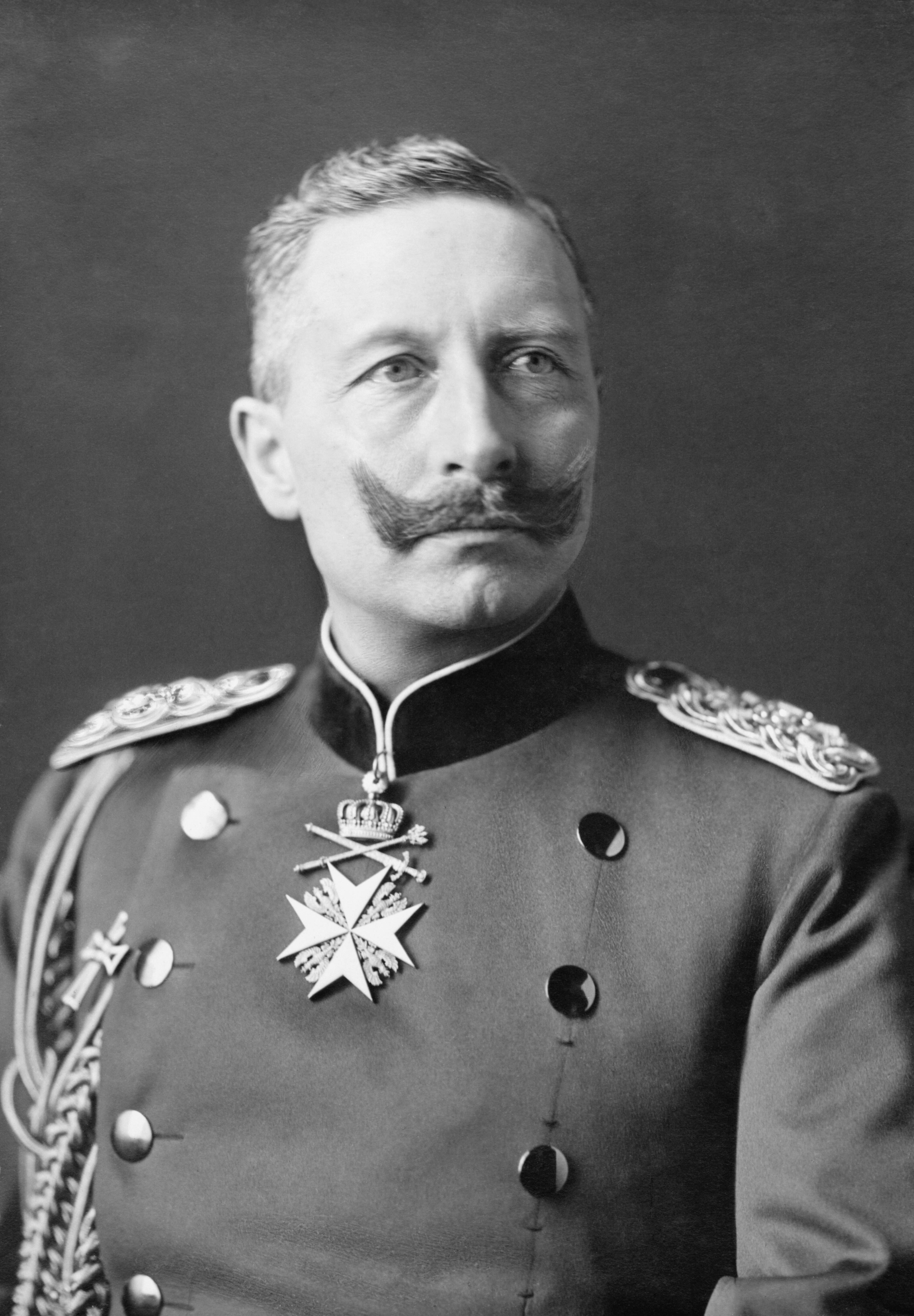
Kaiser Wilhelm II used Yellow Peril ideology as geopolitical justification for German and European imperialism in China.

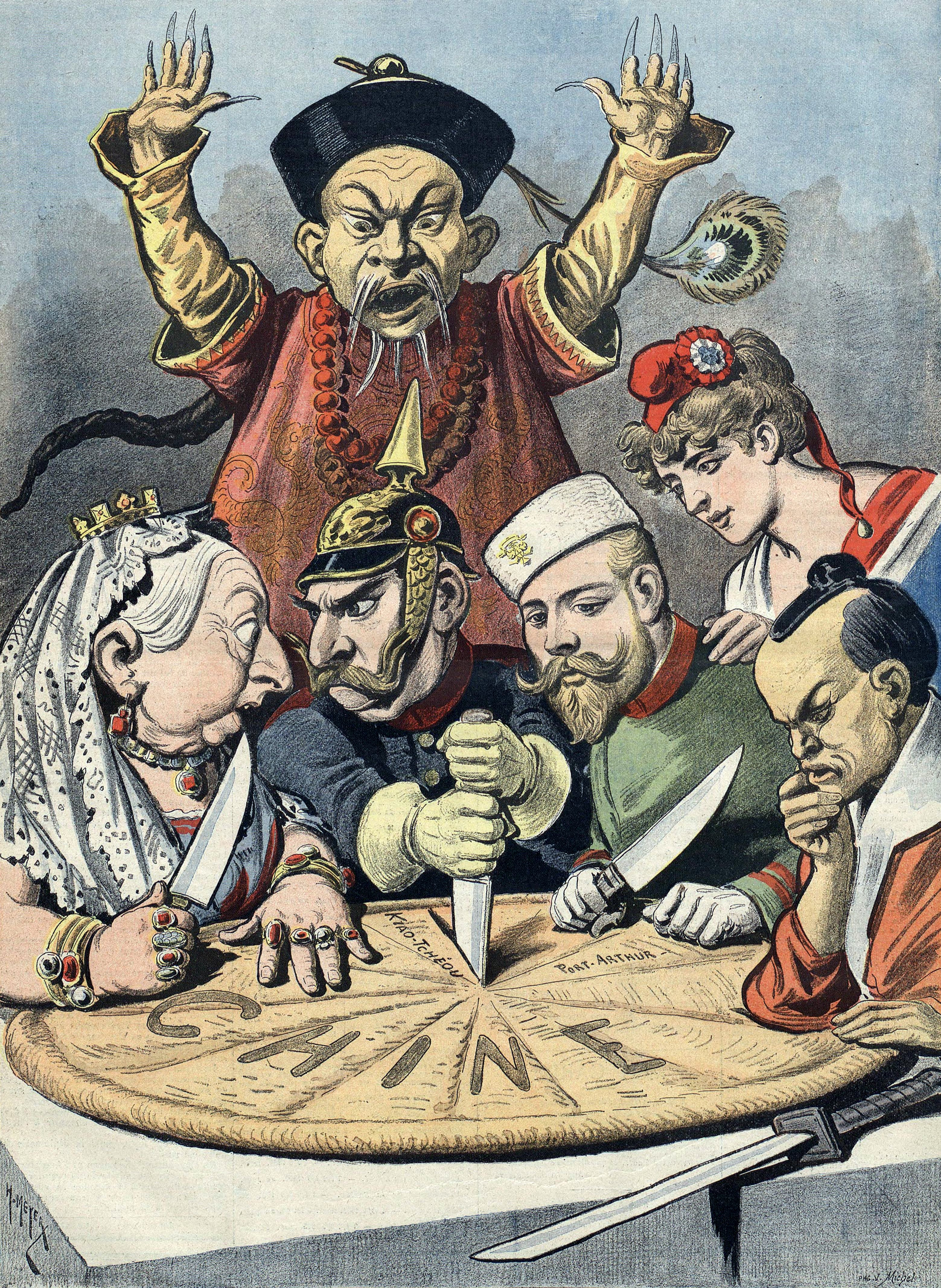
China: The Cake of Kings and ... of Emperors: An angry Mandarin watches Queen Victoria (Britain), Kaiser Wilhelm II (Germany), Tsar Nicholas II (Russia), Marianne (France), and Emperor Meiji (Japan) discuss their partitioning of China.

On 27 July 1900, Kaiser Wilhelm II gave the racist Hunnenrede (Hun speech) exhorting his soldiers to barbarism and that Imperial German soldiers depart Europe for China and suppress the Boxer Rebellion by acting like "Huns" and committing atrocities against the Chinese (Boxer and civilian):

When you come before the enemy, you must defeat him, pardon will not be given, prisoners will not be taken! Whoever falls into your hands will fall to your sword! Just as a thousand years ago the Huns, under their King Attila, made a name for themselves with their ferocity, which tradition still recalls; so may the name of Germany become known in China in such a way that no Chinaman will ever dare look a German in the eye, even with a squint!

Concerned about Germany's international reputation, the Foreign Office released a sanitized version of the speech, removing the Kaiser's calls for "racist barbarism." Annoyed, Wilhelm II published the full, unedited speech. He framed the conflict not as a simple rebellion, but as a "Crusade" and a fundamental clash between the Occident (the West) and the Orient (the East). The speech relied heavily on the "Yellow Peril."

To suppress the Boxers, the Kaiser demanded a policy of extreme brutality. Outraged by the murder of a German diplomat and viewing the Chinese as "cowardly" and "deceitful"—he ordered Field Marshal Alfred von Waldersee to act barbarously. The Eight-Nation Alliance's rejected such barbarism. In August 1900, an international military force of Russian, Japanese, British, French, and American soldiers captured and took full control of Beijing before the German forces arrived.

==== Praxis of barbarism ====
The eight-nation alliance sacked Beijing in vengeance for the Boxer Rebellion; the magnitude of the rape, pillaging and burning indicated "a sense that the Chinese were less than human" to the Western powers. About the sacking of the city, an Australian in China stated: "The future of the Chinese is a fearful problem. Look at the frightful sights one sees in the streets of Peking ... See the filthy, tattered rags they wrap around them. Smell them as they pass. Hear of their nameless immorality. Witness their shameless indecency, and picture them among your own people—Ugh! It makes you shudder!"

British admiral Roger Keyes recalled: "Every Chinaman ... was treated as a Boxer, by the Russian and French troops, and the slaughter of men, women, and children, in retaliation, was revolting". The American missionary Luella Miner reported that "the conduct of the Russian soldiers is atrocious, the French are not much better, and the Japanese are looting and burning without mercy. Women and girls, by the hundreds, have committed suicide to escape a worse fate at the hands of Russian and Japanese brutes."

From contemporary Western observers, German, Russian, and Japanese troops received the greatest criticism for their ruthlessness and willingness to wantonly execute Chinese of all ages and backgrounds, sometimes by burning and killing entire village populations. The Americans and British paid General Yuan Shikai and his army (the Right Division) to help the Eight Nation Alliance suppress the Boxers. Yuan's forces killed tens of thousands of people in their anti-Boxer campaign in Zhili Province and Shandong after the Alliance captured Beijing. The British journalist George Lynch said that "there are things that I must not write, and that may not be printed in England, which would seem to show that this Western civilization of ours is merely a veneer over savagery".

The expedition of German field marshal Waldersee arrived in China on 27 September 1900, after the military defeat of the Boxer Rebellion by the Eight-Nation Alliance, yet he launched 75 punitive raids into northern China to search for and destroy the remaining Boxers. The German soldiers killed more peasants than Boxer guerrillas because by that time, the Society of the Righteous and Harmonious Fists (the Boxers) had posed no threat. On 19 November 1900, at the Reichstag, the German Social Democrat politician August Bebel criticized the Kaiser's attack upon China as shameful to Germany:

No, this is no crusade, no holy war; it is a very ordinary war of conquest ... A campaign of revenge as barbaric as has never been seen in the last centuries, and not often at all in History ... not even with the Huns, not even with the Vandals ... That is not a match for what the German and other troops of foreign powers, together with the Japanese troops, have done in China.

== Cultural fear ==
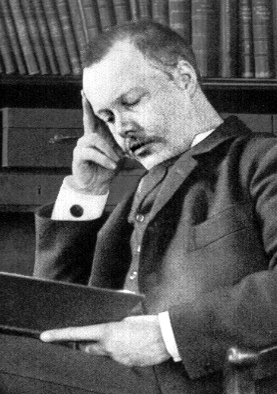
In The Foundations of the Nineteenth Century (1899), Houston Stewart Chamberlain provided racialist ideology for Nazi Germany (1933–1945).

The political praxis of Yellow Peril racism calls for apolitical racial unity among the White peoples of the world. To resolve a contemporary problem (economic, social, political) the racialist politician calls for White unity against the nonwhite Other who threatens Western civilization from distant Asia. Despite the Western powers' military defeat of the anticolonial Boxer Rebellion, Yellow Peril fear of Chinese nationalism became a cultural factor among white people: That "the Chinese race" mean to invade, vanquish, and subjugate Christian civilization in the Western world.

In July 1900, the Völkisch movement intellectual Houston Stewart Chamberlain, the "Evangelist of Race", gave his racialist perspective of the cultural meaning of the Boer War (1899–1902) in relation to the cultural meaning of the Boxer Rebellion: "One thing I can clearly see, that is, that it is criminal for Englishmen and Dutchmen to go on murdering each other, for all sorts of sophisticated reasons, while the Great Yellow Danger overshadows us white men, and threatens destruction." In the book The Foundations of the Nineteenth Century (1899), Chamberlain provided the racist ideology for Pan-Germanism and the Völkisch movements of the early 20th century, which greatly influenced the racial policy of Nazi Germany.

== Racial annihilation ==
=== The Darwinian threat ===
Austrian philosopher Christian von Ehrenfels argued that the Western world and the Eastern world were in a Darwinian racial struggle for domination of the planet, which the yellow race was winning. He said the Chinese were an inferior race and lacked "all potentialities ... determination, initiative, productivity, invention, and organizational talent" he said were innate in the white cultures of the West. Nonetheless, he praised Japan as a first-rate military power whose inevitable conquest of continental China would produce improved breeds of Chinese people. He warned that Asian conquest of the West equaled white racial annihilation.

== Xenophobia and racism ==
=== Germany and Russia ===
From 1895, Kaiser Wilhelm used Yellow Peril ideology to portray Imperial Germany as defender of the West against conquest from the East. In pursuing Weltpolitik policies meant to establish Germany as the dominant empire, the Kaiser manipulated his own government officials, public opinion, and other monarchs. In a letter to Tsar Nicholas II of Russia, the Kaiser said: "It is clearly the great task of the future for Russia to cultivate the Asian continent, and defend Europe from the inroads of the Great Yellow Race". In The Bloody White Baron (2009), the historian James Palmer explains the 19th-century socio-cultural background from which Yellow Peril ideology originated and flourished:

The 1890s had spawned in the West the specter of the "Yellow Peril", the rise to world dominance of the Asian peoples. The evidence cited was Asian population growth, immigration to the West (America and Australia in particular), and increased Chinese settlement along the Russian border. These demographic and political fears were accompanied by a vague and ominous dread of the mysterious powers supposedly possessed by the initiates of Eastern religions. There is a striking German picture of the 1890s, depicting the dream that inspired Kaiser Wilhelm II to coin the term "Yellow Peril", that shows the union of these ideas. It depicts the nations of Europe, personified as heroic, but vulnerable, female figures guarded by the Archangel Michael, gazing apprehensively towards a dark cloud of smoke in the East, in which rests an eerily calm Buddha, wreathed in flame ... Combined with this was a sense of the slow sinking of the Abendland, the "Evening Land" of the West. This would be put most powerfully, by thinkers such as Oswald Spengler in The Decline of the West (1918) and the Prussian philosopher Moeller van den Bruck, a Russophone obsessed with the coming rise of the East. Both called for Germany to join the "young nations" of Asia through the adoption of such supposedly Asiatic practices as collectivism, "inner barbarism", and despotic leadership. The identification of Russia with Asia would eventually overwhelm such sympathies, instead leading to a more-or-less straightforward association of Germany with the values of "The West", against the "Asiatic barbarism" of Russia. That was most obvious during the Nazi era [1933–1945], when virtually every piece of anti–Russian propaganda talked of the "Asiatic millions" or "Mongolian hordes", which threatened to over-run Europe, but the identification of the Russians as Asian, especially as Mongolian, continued well into the Cold War era [1917–1991].

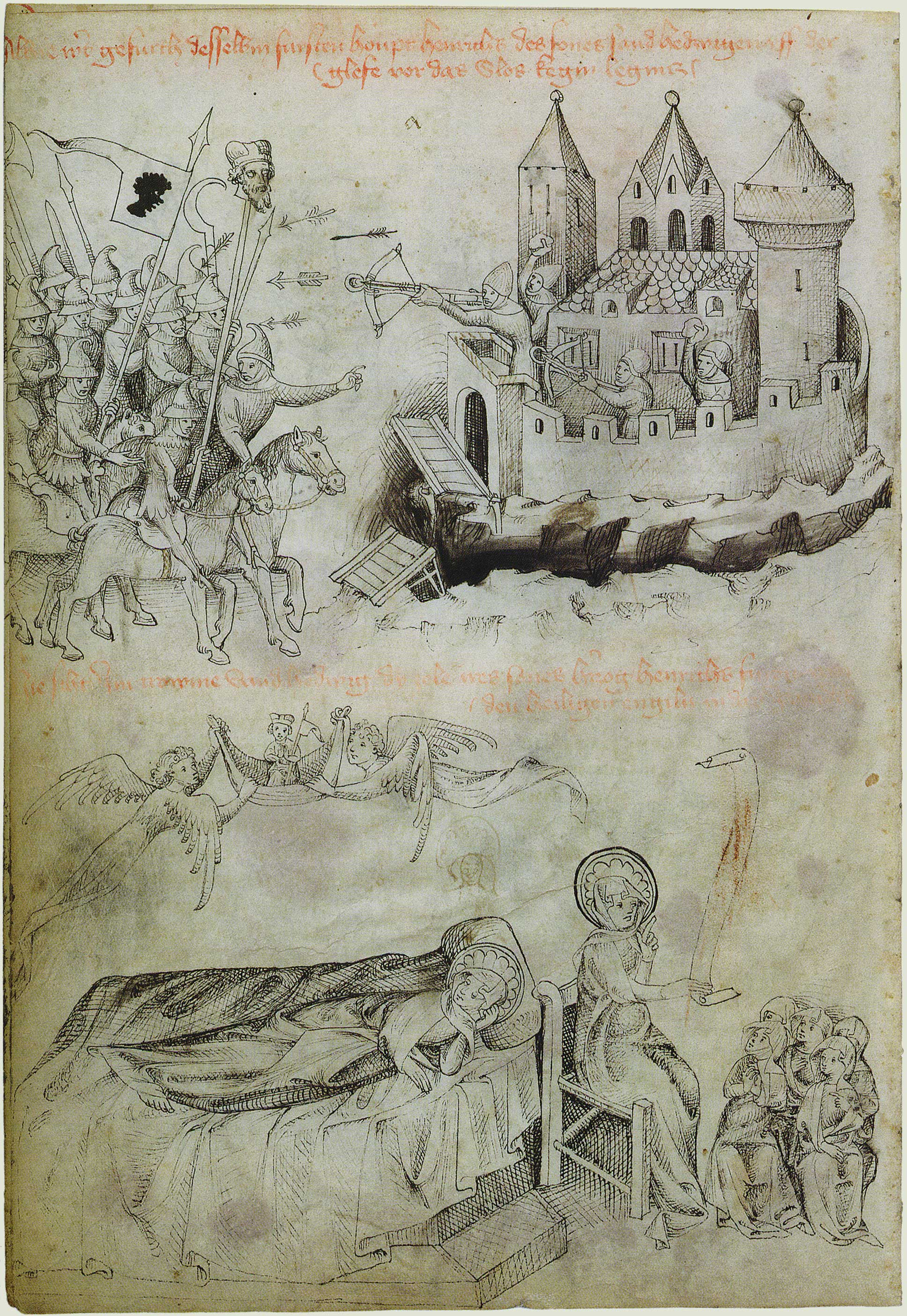
The European collective memory of the Yellow Peril includes the Mongols' display of the severed head of Duke Henry II of Silesia, in Legnica.

As his cousin, Kaiser Wilhelm knew that Tsar Nicholas shared his anti-Asian racism and believed he could persuade the Tsar to abrogate the Franco-Russian Alliance (1894) and then to form a German–Russian alliance against Britain. In manipulative pursuit of Imperial German Weltpolitik "Wilhelm II's deliberate use of the 'yellow peril' slogan was more than a personal idiosyncrasy, and fitted into the general pattern of German foreign policy under his reign, i.e. to encourage Russia's Far Eastern adventures, and later to sow discord, between the United States and Japan. Not the substance, but only the form, of Wilhelm II's 'yellow peril' propaganda disturbed the official policy of the Wilhelmstrasse."

==== Mongols in Europe ====
In the 19th century, the racial and cultural stereotypes of Yellow Peril ideology colored German perceptions of Russia as a nation more Asiatic than European. The European folk memory of the 13th-century Mongol invasion of Europe made the word Mongol a cultural synonym for the "Asian culture of cruelty and insatiable appetite for conquest", which was especially personified by Genghis Khan, leader of the Orda, the Mongol Horde.

Despite that justifying historical background, Yellow Peril racism was not universally accepted in the societies of Europe. French intellectual Anatole France said that Yellow Peril ideology was to be expected from a racist man such as the Kaiser. Inverting the racist premise of Asian invasion, France showed that European imperialism in Asia and Africa indicated that the European White Peril was the true threat to the world. In his essay "The Bogey of the Yellow Peril" (1904), the British journalist Demetrius Charles Boulger said the Yellow Peril was racist hysteria for popular consumption. Asian geopolitical dominance of the world is "the prospect, placed before the uninstructed reading public, is a revival of the Hun and Mongol terrors, and the names of Attila and Genghis are set out in the largest type to create feelings of apprehension. The reader is assured, in the most positive manner, that this is the doing of the enterprising nation of Japan". Throughout the successful imperial intrigues facilitated by Germany's Yellow Peril ideology, the Kaiser's true geopolitical target was Britain.

=== United Kingdom ===
Though Chinese civilization was admired in 18th century Britain, by the 19th century, the Opium Wars led to the creation of racialist stereotypes of the Chinese among the British public, who cast the Chinese "as a threatening, expansionist foe" and a corrupt and depraved people. Still, there were exceptions to popular racism of the Yellow Peril. In May 1890, William Ewart Gladstone criticized anti-Chinese immigration laws in Australia for penalizing their virtues of hard work (diligence, thrift and integrity), instead of penalizing their vices (gambling and opium smoking).

==== Cultural temper ====
In 1904, in a meeting about the Russo-Japanese War, King Edward VII heard the Kaiser complain that the Yellow Peril is "the greatest peril menacing ... Christendom and European civilization. If the Russians went on giving ground, the yellow race would, in twenty years time, be in Moscow and Posen". The Kaiser criticized the British for siding with Japan against Russia, and said that "race treason" was the motive. King Edward said he "could not see it. The Japanese were an intelligent, brave and chivalrous nation, quite as civilized as the Europeans, from whom they only differed by the pigmentation of their skin".

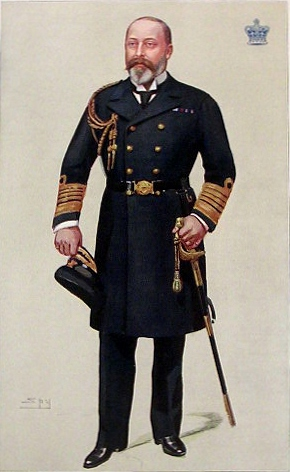
Unlike the Kaiser of Germany, King Edward VII of the United Kingdom did not see the Japanese as the Yellow Peril in the Russo–Japanese War. (1904–05)

The first British usage of the Yellow Peril phrase was in the Daily News (21 July 1900) report describing the Boxer Rebellion as "the yellow peril in its most serious form". In that time, British Sinophobia, the fear of Chinese people, did not include all Asians, because Britain had sided with Japan during the Russo–Japanese War, whilst France and Germany supported Russia; whereas the reports of Captain William Pakenham "tended to depict Russia as his enemy, not just Japan's".

About pervasive Sinophobia in Western culture, in The Yellow Peril: Dr Fu Manchu & the Rise of Chinaphobia (2014), historian Christopher Frayling noted:

In the early decades of the 20th century, Britain buzzed with Sinophobia. Respectable middle-class magazines, tabloids and comics, alike, spread stories of ruthless Chinese ambitions to destroy the West. The Chinese master-criminal (with his "crafty yellow face twisted by a thin-lipped grin", dreaming of world domination) had become a staple of children's publications. In 1911, "The Chinese in England: A Growing National Problem" an article distributed around the Home Office, warned of "a vast and convulsive Armageddon to determine who is to be the master of the world, the white or yellow man." After the First World War, cinemas, theater, novels, and newspapers broadcast visions of the "Yellow Peril" machinating to corrupt white society. In March 1929, the chargé d'affaires, at London's Chinese legation, complained that no fewer than five plays, showing in the West End, depicted Chinese people in "a vicious and objectionable form".

==== Moralistic panic ====
The Limehouse district in London (which had a large Chinese element) was portrayed in the British popular imagination as a center of moral depravity and vice, i.e. sexual prostitution, opium smoking, and gambling. According to historian Anne Witchard, many Londoners believed the British Chinese community, including Triad gangsters, "were abducting young English women to sell into white slavery", a fate "worse than death" in Western popular culture. In 1914, at the start of the First World War, the Defense of the Realm Act was amended to include the smoking of opium as proof of "moral depravity" that merited deportation, a legal pretext for deporting members of the Chinese community to China. This anti-Chinese moral panic derived in part from the social reality that British women were becoming more financially independent by way of war-production jobs, which allowed them (among other things) greater sexual freedom, a cultural threat to Britain's patriarchal society. Witchard noted that stories of "working-class girls consorting with "Chinamen" in Limehouse" and "debutantes leading officers astray in Soho drinking dens" contributed to the anti-Chinese moral panic.

=== United States ===
==== 19th century ====
In the U.S., Yellow Peril xenophobia was legalized with the Page Act of 1875, the Chinese Exclusion Act of 1882, and the Geary Act of 1892. The Chinese Exclusion Act replaced the Burlingame Treaty (1868), which had encouraged Chinese migration, and provided that "citizens of the United States in China, of every religious persuasion, and Chinese subjects, in the United States, shall enjoy entire liberty of conscience, and shall be exempt from all disability or persecution, on account of their religious faith or worship, in either country", withholding only the right of naturalized citizenship.

In Tombstone, Arizona, sheriff Johnny Behan and mayor John Clum organized the "Anti-Chinese League" in 1880, which was reorganized into the "Anti-Chinese Secret Society of Cochise County" in 1886. In 1880, the Yellow Peril pogrom of Denver featured the lynching of a Chinese man and the destruction of Denver's Chinatown ghetto. In 1885, the Rock Springs massacre of 28 miners destroyed a Wyoming Chinese community. In Washington Territory, Yellow Peril fear provoked the Attack on Squak Valley Chinese laborers, 1885; the arson of the Seattle Chinatown; and the Tacoma riot of 1885, by which the local white inhabitants expelled the Chinese community from their towns. In Seattle, the Knights of Labor expelled 200 Chinese people with the Seattle riot of 1886. In Oregon, 34 Chinese gold miners were ambushed, robbed, and killed in the Hells Canyon Massacre (1887). Moreover, concerning the experience of being Chinese in the 19th-century U.S., in the essay "A Chinese View of the Statue of Liberty" (1885), Sauum Song Bo said:

Seeing that the heading is an appeal to American citizens, to their love of country and liberty, I feel my countrymen, and myself, are honored in being thus appealed to, as citizens in the cause of liberty. But the word liberty makes me think of the fact that this country is a land of liberty for men of all nations, except the Chinese. I consider it an insult to us Chinese to call on us to contribute towards building, in this land, a pedestal for a statue of liberty. That statue represents Liberty holding a torch, which lights the passage of those of all nations who come into this country. But are Chinese allowed to come? As for the Chinese who are here, are they allowed to enjoy liberty as men of all other nationalities enjoy it? Are they allowed to go about everywhere free from insults, abuse, assaults, wrongs and injuries from which men of other nationalities are free?

==== 20th century ====
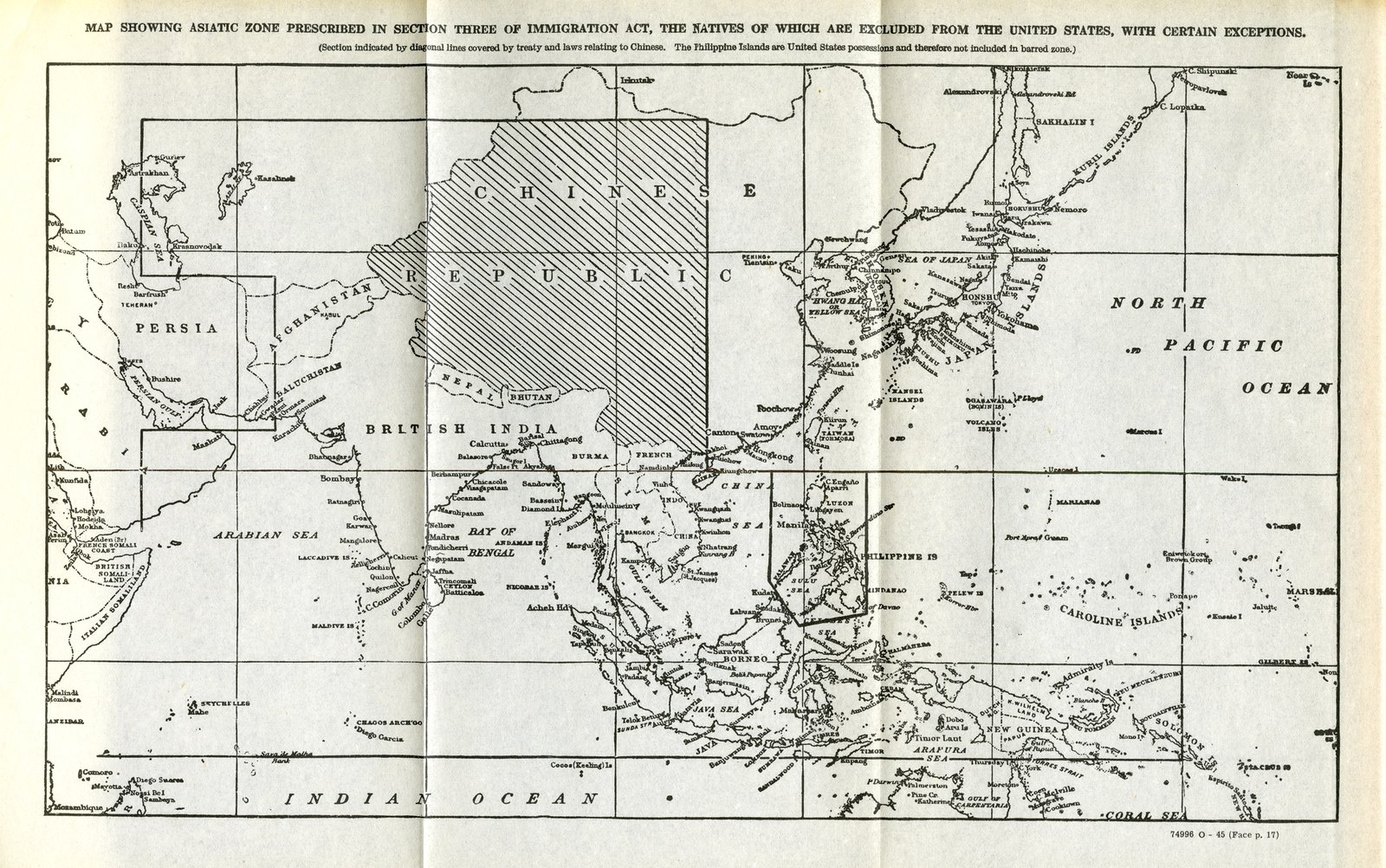
To contain the Yellow Peril, the Immigration Act of 1917 established the Asiatic Barred Zone from which the U.S. admitted no immigrants.

Under nativist political pressure, the Immigration Act of 1917 established an Asian Barred Zone of countries from which immigration to the U.S. was forbidden. The Cable Act of 1922 (Married Women's Independent Nationality Act) guaranteed citizenship to independent women unless they were married to a nonwhite alien ineligible for naturalization. Asian men and women were excluded from American citizenship except for natural born citizens.

In practice, the Cable Act of 1922 reversed some racial exclusions, and granted independent woman citizenship exclusively to women married to white men. Analogously, the Cable Act allowed the government to revoke the citizenship of an American white woman married an Asian man. The law was formally challenged before the Supreme Court, with the case of Takao Ozawa v. United States (1922), whereby a Japanese American man tried to demonstrate that the Japanese people are a white race eligible for naturalized American citizenship. The Court ruled that the Japanese are not white people; two years later, the National Origins Quota of 1924 specifically excluded the Japanese from entering the US and from American citizenship.

==== Ethnic national character ====
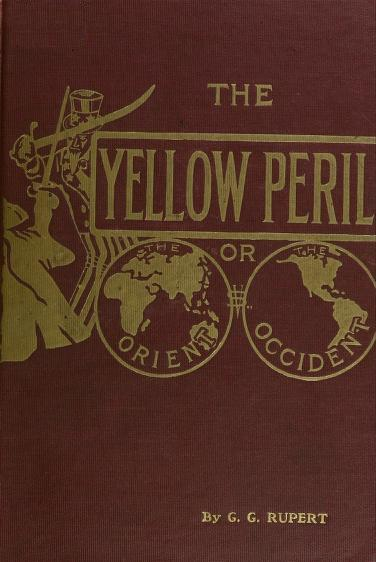
The religious racialism of The Yellow Peril (1911, 3rd ed.), by G. G. Rupert, proposed that Russia would unite the Oriental races to invade, conquer, and subjugate Christian civilization in the Western world.

To "preserve the ideal of American homogeneity", the Emergency Quota Act of 1921 (numeric limits) and the Immigration Act of 1924 (fewer southern and eastern Europeans) restricted admission to the United States according to the skin color and the race of the immigrant. In practice, the Emergency Quota Act used outdated census data to determine the number of colored immigrants to admit to the U.S. To protect WASP ethnic supremacy (social, economic, political) in the 20th century, the Immigration Act of 1924 used the twenty-year-old census of 1890, because its 19th-century demographic-group percentages favored more admissions of WASP immigrants from western and northern Europe, and fewer admissions of colored immigrants from Asia and southern and eastern Europe.

To ensure that the immigration of colored peoples did not change the WASP national character of the United States, the National Origins Formula (1921–1965) meant to maintain the status quo percentages of "ethnic populations" in lesser proportion to the existing white populations; thus, the yearly quota allowed only 150,000 People of Color into the U.S.A. In the event, the national-origins Formula was voided and repealed with the Immigration and Nationality Act of 1965.

==== Eugenic apocalypse ====
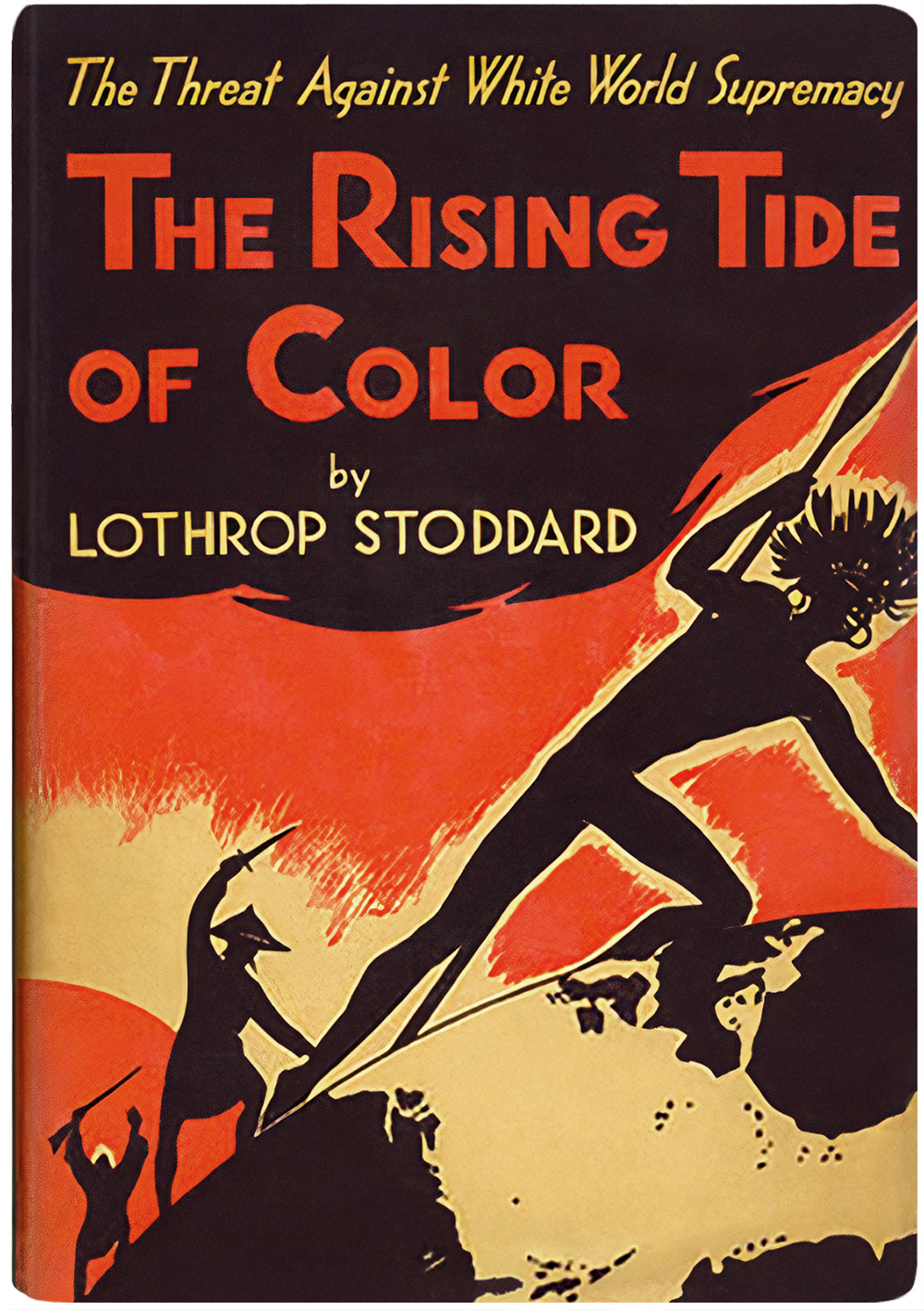
The eugenic racialism proposed in The Rising Tide of Color Against White World-Supremacy (1920), by Lothrop Stoddard, presents either China or Japan as uniting the Oriental races to invade, conquer, and subjugate the white civilizations of the Western world.

Eugenicists used the Yellow Peril to misrepresent the U.S. as an exclusively WASP nation threatened by miscegenation with the Asian Other by expressing their racism with biological language (infection, disease, decay) and imagery of penetration (wounds and sores) of the white body. In The Yellow Peril; or, Orient vs. Occident (1911), the end time evangelist G. G. Rupert said that Russia would unite the colored races to facilitate the Oriental invasion, conquest, and subjugation of the West; said white supremacy is in the Christian eschatology of verse 16:12 in the Book of Revelation: "Then the sixth angel poured out his bowl on the great Euphrates River, and it dried up so that the kings from the east could march their armies toward the west without hindrance". As an Old-Testament Christian, Rupert believed the racialist doctrine of British Israelism, and said that the Yellow Peril from China, India, Japan, and Korea, were attacking Britain and the US, but that the Christian God himself would halt the Asian conquest of the Western world.

In The Rising Tide of Color Against White World-Supremacy (1920), the eugenicist Lothrop Stoddard said that either China or Japan would unite the colored peoples of Asia and lead them to destroy white supremacy in the Western world, and that the Asian conquest of the world began with the Japanese victory in the Russo–Japanese War (1905). As a white supremacist, Stoddard presented his racism with Biblical language and catastrophic imagery depicting a rising tide of colored people meaning to invade, conquer, and subjugate the white race.

==== Political opposition ====
In that cultural vein, the phrase "yellow peril" was common editorial usage in the newspapers of publisher William Randolph Hearst. In the 1930s, Hearst's newspapers conducted a campaign of vilification (personal and political) against Elaine Black, an American communist, whom he denounced as a libertine "Tiger Woman" for her interracial cohabitation with the Japanese American communist Karl Yoneda. In 1931, interracial marriage was illegal in California, but, in 1935, Black and Yoneda married in Seattle, Washington, where such marriages were legal.

==== Socially acceptable Asian ====
In the 1930s, Yellow Peril stereotypes were common to US culture, exemplified by the cinematic versions of the Asian detectives Charlie Chan (Warner Oland) and Mr. Moto (Peter Lorre), originally literary detectives in novels and comic strips. White actors portrayed the Asian men and made the fictional characters socially acceptable in mainstream American cinema, especially when the villains were secret agents of Imperial Japan.

American proponents of the Japanese Yellow Peril were the military-industrial interests of the China Lobby (right-wing intellectuals, businessmen, Christian missionaries) who advocated financing and supporting the warlord Generalissimo Chiang Kai-shek, a Methodist convert whom they represented as the Christian Chinese savior of China, then embroiled in the Chinese Civil War (1927–1937, 1946–1950). After the Japanese invaded China in 1937, the China Lobby successfully pressured the U.S. government to aid Chiang Kai-shek's faction. The news media's reportage (print, radio, cinema) of the Second Sino-Japanese War (1937–45) favored China, which politically facilitated the American financing and equipping of the anticommunist Kuomintang, the Chiang Kai-shek faction in the civil war against the Communist faction led by Mao Tse-tung.

Madame Chiang Kai-shek (Soong Mei-ling) wife of Chiang Kai-shek (President of the Republic of China), Is credited for her role in reducing anti-Chinese sentiment and influencing the repeal of the Chinese Exclusion Act. She gained respect from the US administration, working closely in partnership with her husband, particularly in his Chinese foreign relations due to her excellent English. To the administration she was a sign of hope, representing the success of the US cultural exchange with China, her father having been converted to Christianity by a US missionary, and became a symbol of the US-Chinese alliance against Japan. Her popularity amongst the US population, drawing crowds of up to 30,000 on her 1943 nationwide speaking tour, changed the image of Chinese women. She was not only idolised for being glamorous, appearing on the cover of TIME magazine numerous times, but also represented a relatability due to her Christian faith and having received a good American education. The Citizens Committee to repeal Chinese Exclusion utilised her public popularity and good reputation to push for change in immigration laws. Further she influenced opinion congression on Chinese citizenship; representative Walter Judd proclaiming on national radio,

"Our exclusion of the Chinese on a racial basis also violates the finest traditions and the moral sense of the American people. Under our present laws, Hitler is admissible to our country and eligible for citizenship—Madame Chiang Kai-shek is not!"

Madame Chiang was a symbol of the modern Chinese population and changed the US perception of China. She showed the potential for modernising China to become a democratic nation.

==== Pragmatic racialism ====
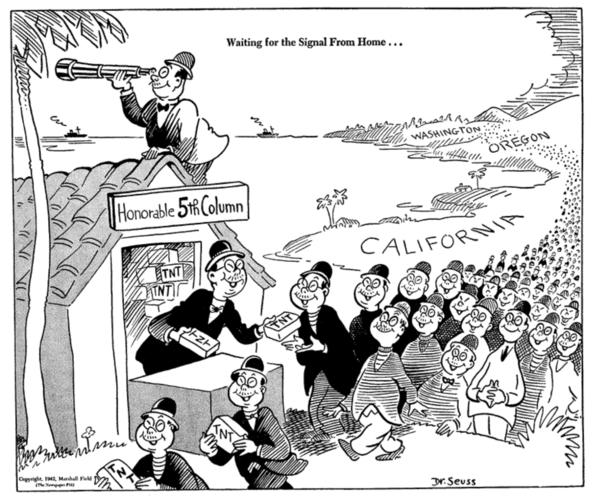
1942 editorial propaganda cartoon in the New York newspaper PM by Dr. Seuss depicting Japanese Americans in California, Oregon, and Washington—states with the largest population of Japanese Americans—as prepared to conduct sabotage against the U.S.

In 1941, after the Japanese attack on Pearl Harbor, the Roosevelt administration formally declared China an ally of the U.S., and news media modified their use of Yellow Peril ideology to include China to the West, criticizing contemporary anti-Chinese laws as counterproductive to the war effort against Imperial Japan. The wartime zeitgeist and the geopolitics of the U.S. government presumed that defeat of the Imperial Japan would be followed by postwar China developing into a capitalist economy under the strongman leadership of the Christian Generalissimo Chiang Kai-shek and the Kuomintang (Chinese Nationalist Party).

In his relations with the American government and his China Lobby sponsors, Chiang requested the repeal of American anti-Chinese laws; to achieve the repeals, Chiang threatened to exclude the American business community from the "China Market", the economic fantasy that the China Lobby promised to the American business community. In 1943, the Chinese Exclusion Act of 1882 was repealed, but, because the National Origins Act of 1924 was contemporary law, the repeal was a symbolic gesture of American solidarity with the people of China.

Science fiction writer William F. Wu said that American adventure, crime, and detective pulp magazines in the 1930s had many Yellow Peril characters, loosely based on Fu Manchu; although "most [Yellow Peril characters] were of Chinese descent", the geopolitics of the time led white people to see Japan as a threat to the United States. In The Yellow Peril: Chinese Americans in American fiction, 1850–1940 (1982), Wu said that fear of Asians dates from the European Middle Ages, from the 13th-century Mongol invasion of Europe. Most Europeans had never seen an Asian man or woman, and the great differences in language, custom, and physique accounted for European paranoia about the nonwhite peoples from the Eastern world.

==== 21st century ====
The American academic Frank H. Wu said that anti-Chinese sentiment incited by people such as Steve Bannon and Peter Thiel is recycling anti-Asian hatred from the 19th century into a "new Yellow Peril" that is common to White populist politics that do not distinguish between Asian foreigners and Asian American U.S. citizens. That American cultural anxiety about the geopolitical ascent of the People's Republic of China originates in the fact that, the West, led by the U.S., is challenged by a people whom Westerners viewed as culturally backward and racially inferior only a generation earlier. That the U.S. perceives China as "the enemy", because their economic success voids the myth of white supremacy upon which the West claims cultural superiority over the East. Moreover, the COVID-19 pandemic has facilitated and increased the occurrence of xenophobia and anti-Chinese racism, which the academic Chantal Chung said has "deep roots in yellow peril ideology". Additionally, Chinese American scientists have been attacked via their removal from research institutions in the United States (Siu & Chun, 2020, p. 429). The targeted investigations on Chinese scientists were due to America's fear that "China was using the TTP and other funding programs to acquire intellectual property via U.S.-based scientists" (Siu & Chun, 2020, p. 429). As a result, "many Chinese American scientists have been removed from their tenured positions, often without due process or even an opportunity to respond to the allegations" (Siu & Chun, 2020, p. 429).

=== Australia ===
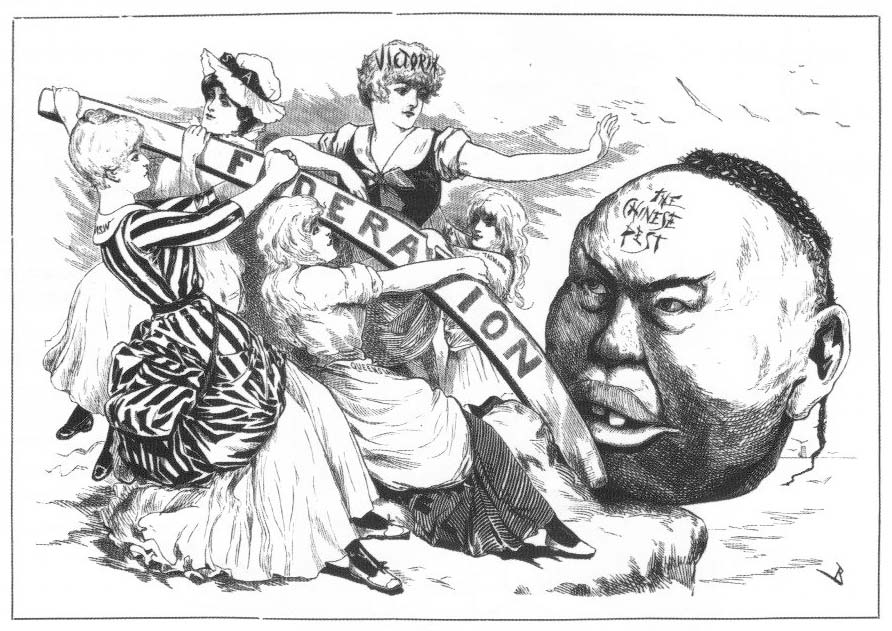
The White Australia policy arose from the growth of anti-Asian (particularly Chinese) sentiments that peaked in the late 19th and early 20th centuries. Pictured: The Melbourne Punch (c. May 1888)

In the late 19th and early 20th centuries, fear of the Yellow Peril was a cultural feature of the white peoples who sought to establish a country and a society in the Australian continent. The racialist fear of the nonwhite Asian Other was a thematic preoccupation common to invasion literature novels, such as The Yellow Wave: A Romance of the Asiatic Invasion of Australia (1895), The Colored Conquest (1904), The Awakening to China (1909), and the Fools' Harvest (1939). Such fantasy literature featured an Asian invasion of "the empty north" of Australia, which was populated by the Aboriginal Australians, the nonwhite, native Other with whom the white emigrants competed for living space. In the novel White or Yellow?: A Story of the Race War of A.D. 1908 (1887), the journalist and labor leader William Lane said that a horde of Chinese people legally arrived in Australia and overran white society and monopolized the industries for exploiting the natural resources of the Australian "empty north".

==== White nation ====
As Australian invasion literature of the 19th-century, the future history novel White or Yellow? (1887) presents William Lane's nationalist racialism and left-wing politics that portrayed Australia under threat by the Yellow Peril. In the near future, British capitalists manipulate the Australian legal system and then legislate the mass immigration of Chinese workers to Australia, regardless of the socioeconomic consequences to white Australian society. Consequent to the British manipulation of Australia's economy, the resulting social conflicts (racial, financial, cultural, sexual) escalate into a race war for control of Australia.

The Yellow Peril racism in the narrative of the novel White or Yellow? justifies White Australians' killing Chinese workers as a defensive, existential response for control of Australia. Lang's story of White racial replacement appeals to the fears that labor and trade union leaders exploited to oppose the legal immigration of Chinese workers, whom they misrepresented as racial, economic, and moral threats to White Australia. That Asian libertinism threatens White Christian civilization, which theme Lang represents with miscegenation (mixing of the races). The fear of racial replacement was presented as an apolitical call to white racial unity in among Australians.

Culturally, Yellow Peril invasion novels expressed themes of the white man's sexual fear of the supposed voracious sexuality of Asian men and women. The stories feature Western women in sexual peril, usually rape-by-seduction facilitated with the sensual and moral release of smoked opium. In the patriarchal world of invasion literature, interracial sexual relations were "a fate worse than death" for a white woman, afterward, she was a sexual untouchable to white men. In the 1890s, that moralistic theme was the anti-Chinese message of the feminist and labor organizer Rose Summerfield who voiced the white woman's sexual fear of the Yellow Peril, by warning society of the Chinese man's unnaturally lustful gaze upon the pulchritude of Australian women.

==== Opposition to the racial equality proposal ====
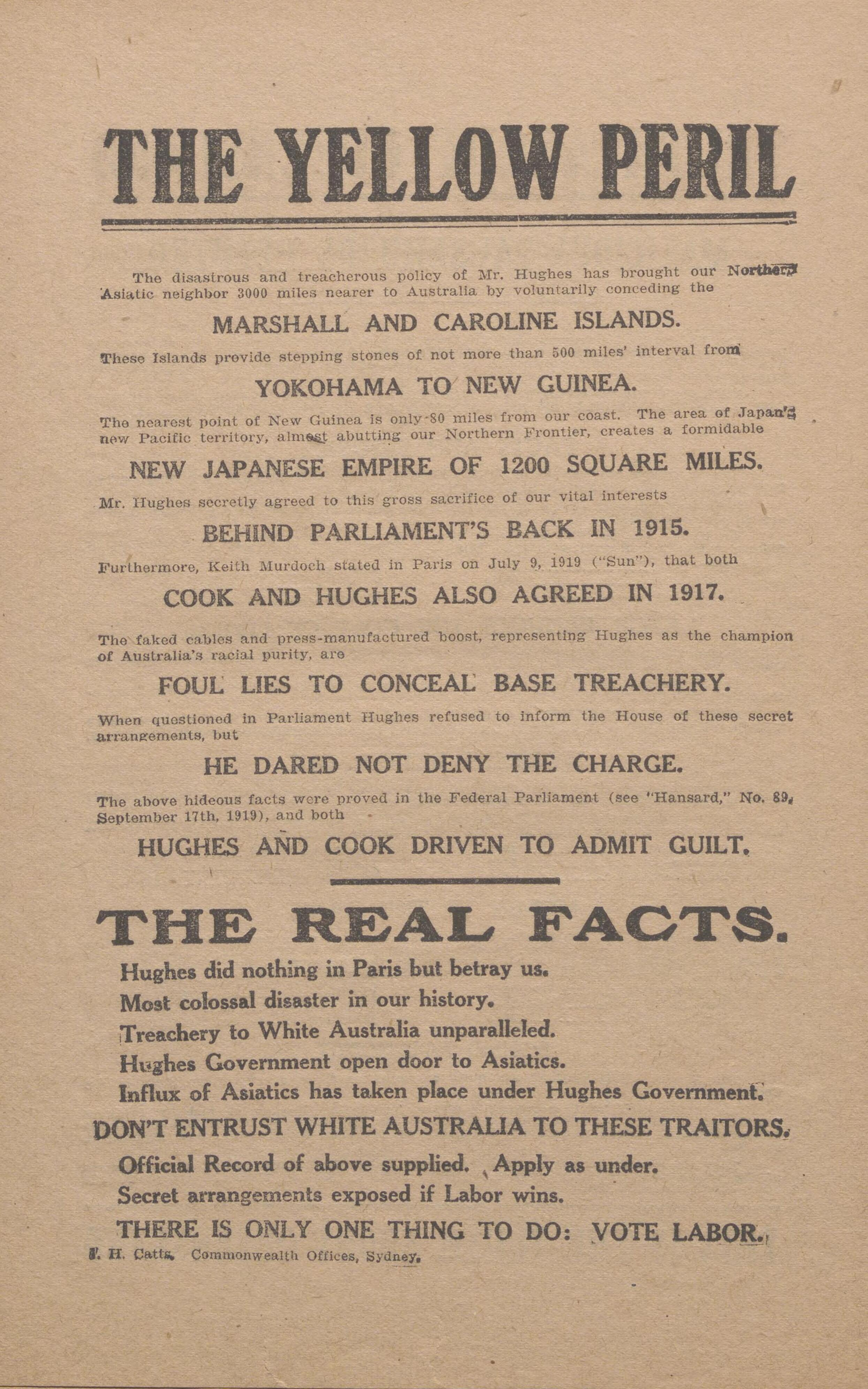
"Yellow Peril" poster used by the Australian Labor Party during the 1919 Australian federal election

In 1901, the Australian federal government adopted the White Australia policy that had been informally initiated with the Immigration Restriction Act 1901, which generally excluded Asians, but in particular excluded the Chinese and the Melanesian peoples. Historian C. E. W. Bean said that the White Australia policy was "a vehement effort to maintain a high, Western standard of economy, society, and culture (necessitating, at that stage, however it might be camouflaged, the rigid exclusion of Oriental peoples)" from Australia. In 1913, appealing to the irrational fear of the Yellow Peril, the film Australia Calls (1913) depicted a "Mongolian" invasion of Australia, which eventually is defeated by ordinary Australians with underground, political resistance and guerrilla warfare, and not by the army of the Australian federal government.

In 1919, at the Paris Peace Conference, Australian Prime Minister Billy Hughes vehemently opposed the Japanese delegation's request for the inclusion of the Racial Equality Proposal to Article 21 of the Covenant of the League of Nations:

The equality of nations being a basic principle of the League of Nations, the High Contracting Parties agree to accord, as soon as possible, to all alien nationals of states, members of the League, equal and just treatment in every respect, making no distinction, either in law or in fact, on account of their race or nationality.

Hughes stated in response to the proposal that "ninety-five out of one hundred Australians rejected the very idea of equality"; he had entered politics as a trade unionist and, like the majority of the white Australian population, was strongly opposed to Asian immigration into Australia. Hughes believed that accepting the clause would mean the end of the White Australia policy and wrote: "No Gov't could live for a day in Australia if it tampered with a White Australia." Though UK officials in the British delegation (which Australia was a part of) found the proposal compatible with Britain's stance of nominal equality for all British subjects as a principle for maintaining imperial unity, they ultimately succumbed to pressure from politicians in Britain's dominions, including Hughes, and signalled their opposition to the clause.

Though conference chairman, U.S. President Woodrow Wilson, was indifferent to the clause, he eventually sided with the British delegation and stipulated that a unilateral requirement of a unanimous vote by the countries in the League of Nations was required for the clause to be included. On 11 April 1919, after protracted and heated debate, a final vote was called; from a quorum of 17, the proposal secured 11 votes in favor, with no delegate from any nation voting no, though there were 6 abstentions, including all 4 from the British and American delegations; it did not pass.

=== France ===
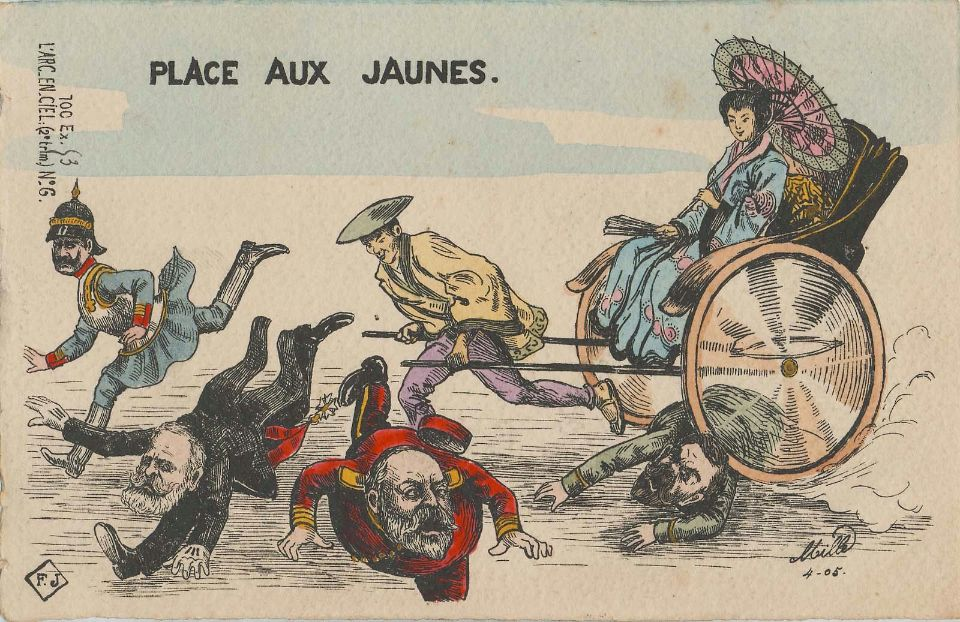
French postcard captioned "Make way for the yellows" shows Japanese imperialism running over four great nations of Europe—Russia, Britain, France, and Germany

==== Colonial empire ====
In the late 19th century, French imperialist politicians invoked the Péril jaune (Yellow Peril) in their negative comparisons of France's low birth-rate and the high birth-rates of Asian countries. From that racist claim arose an artificial, cultural fear among the French population that immigrant-worker Asians soon would "flood" France, which could be successfully countered only by increased fecundity of French women. Then, France would possess enough soldiers to thwart the eventual flood of immigrants from Asia. From that racialist perspective, the French press sided with Imperial Russia during the Russo-Japanese War (1904–1905), by representing the Russians as heroes defending the white race against the Japanese Yellow Peril.

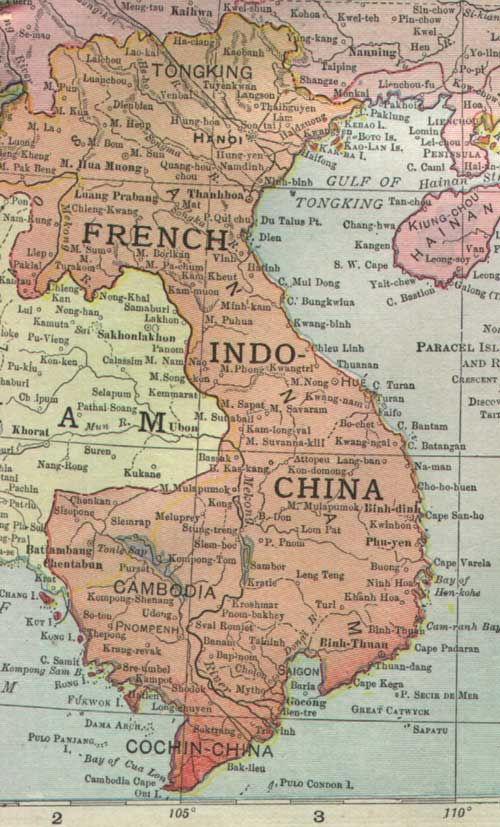
French Indochina: In the oriental French Empire, the country and people of Vietnam were renamed French Indochina. (1913)

In the early 20th century, in 1904, the French journalist René Pinon reported that the Yellow Peril were a cultural, geopolitical, and existential threat to white civilization in the Western world:

The "Yellow Peril" has entered already into the imagination of the people, just as represented in the famous drawing [Peoples of Europe, Guard Your Most Sacred Possessions,1895] of the Emperor Wilhelm II: In a setting of conflagration and carnage, Japanese and Chinese hordes spread out over all Europe, crushing under their feet the ruins of our capital cities and destroying our civilizations, grown anemic due to the enjoyment of luxuries, and corrupted by the vanity of spirit.

Hence, little by little, there emerges the idea that even if a day must come (and that day does not seem near) the European peoples will cease to be their own enemies and even economic rivals, there will be a struggle ahead to face and there will rise a new peril, the yellow man.

The civilized world has always organized itself before and against a common adversary: for the Roman world, it was the barbarian; for the Christian world, it was Islam; for the world of tomorrow, it may well be the yellow man. And so we have the reappearance of this necessary concept, without which peoples do not know themselves, just as the "Me" only takes conscience of itself in opposition to the "non-Me": The Enemy.

Despite the claimed Christian idealism of the civilizing mission, from the start of colonization in 1858, the French exploited the natural resources of Vietnam as inexhaustible and the Vietnamese people as beasts of burden. In the aftermath of the Second World War, the First Indochina War (1946–1954) justified recolonization of Vietnam as a defense of the white West against the péril jaune—specifically that the Communist Party of Vietnam were puppets of the People's Republic of China, which is part of the "international communist conspiracy" to conquer the world. Therefore, French anticommunism utilized orientalism to dehumanize the Vietnamese into "the nonwhite Other"; which yellow-peril racism allowed atrocities against Viet Minh prisoners of war during la sale guerre ("dirty war"). In that time, yellow-peril racism remained one of the ideological bases for the existence of French Indochina, thus the French news media's racialist misrepresentations of Viet Minh guerrillas being part of the innombrables masses jaunes (innumerable yellow hordes); being one of many vagues hurlantes (roaring waves) of masses fanatisées (fanatical hordes).

==== Contemporary France ====
In Behind the Bamboo Hedge: The Impact of Homeland Politics in the Parisian Vietnamese Community (1991) Gisèle Luce Bousquet said that the péril jaune, which traditionally colored French perceptions of Asians, especially of Vietnamese people, remains a cultural prejudice of contemporary France; hence the French perceive and resent the Vietnamese people of France as academic overachievers who take jobs from "native French" people.

In 2015, the cover of the January issue of Fluide Glacial magazine featured a cartoon, Yellow Peril: Is it Already Too Late?, which depicts a Chinese-occupied Paris where a sad Frenchman is pulling a rickshaw, transporting a Chinese man, in 19th c. French colonial uniform, accompanied by a barely dressed, blonde French woman. The editor of Fluide Glacial, Yan Lindingre, defended the magazine cover and the subject as satire and mockery of French fears of China's economic threat to France. In an editorial addressing the Chinese government's complaint, Lindingre said, "I have just ordered an extra billion copies printed, and will send them to you via chartered flight. This will help us balance our trade deficit, and give you a good laugh".

=== Italy ===
In the 20th century, from their perspective, as nonwhite nations in a world order dominated by the white nations, the geopolitics of Ethiopia–Japan relations allowed Imperial Japan and Ethiopia to avoid imperialist European colonization of their countries and nations. Before the Second Italo-Ethiopian War (1934–1936), Imperial Japan had given diplomatic and military support to Ethiopia against invasion by Fascist Italy, which implied military assistance. In response to that Asian anti-imperialism, Benito Mussolini ordered a Yellow Peril propaganda campaign by the Italian press, which represented Imperial Japan as the military, cultural, and existential threat to the Western world, by way of the dangerous "yellow race–black race" alliance meant to unite Asians and Africans against the white people of the world.

In a report from the Chamber of Deputies on 2 January 1934, Marquis Giacomo Medici del Vascello wrote: "Today Japan is invading China, and inspired by race hatred she is laying plans for tomorrow against the white race." The Chamber of Deputies described Japan's withdrawal from the League of Nations as "significant and threatening."

In 1935, Mussolini warned of the Japanese Yellow Peril, specifically the racial threat of Asia and Africa uniting against Europe. In the summer of 1935, the National Fascist Party often staged anti–Japanese political protests throughout Italy. Nonetheless, as right-wing imperial powers, Japan and Italy pragmatically agreed to disagree; in exchange for Italian diplomatic recognition of Manchukuo (1932–45), the Japanese puppet state in China, Imperial Japan would not aid Ethiopia against Italian invasion and so Italy would end the anti–Japanese Yellow Peril propaganda in the national press of Italy.

=== Mexico ===
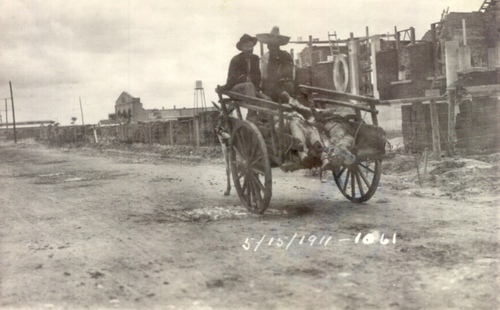
In revolutionary Mexico (1910–1920), a wagonload of Asian corpses is en route to a common grave after fear of the Yellow Peril provoked a three-day massacre (11–15 May 1911) of 308 Asian people (303 Chinese, 5 Japanese) in the city of Torreón, Coahuila, in northern Mexico.

During the Mexican Revolution (1910–1920), Chinese-Mexicans were subjected to racist abuse before the revolt: for not being Christians, (specifically Roman Catholic); for not being racially Mexican; and for not soldiering and fighting in the Revolution against the thirty-five-year dictatorship (1876–1911) of General Porfirio Díaz.

The notable atrocity against Asian people was the three-day Torreón massacre (13–15 May 1911) in northern Mexico, wherein the military forces of Francisco I. Madero killed 308 Asian people (303 Chinese, 5 Japanese), because they were deemed a cultural threat to the Mexican way of life. In 2021, 110 years later, then-president of Mexico López Obrador apologized for his country's role in massacre. The massacre of Chinese and Japanese Mexicans at the city of Torreón, Coahuila, was not the only such atrocity perpetrated in the Revolution. Elsewhere, in 1913, after the Constitutional Army captured the city of Tamasopo, San Luis Potosí state, the soldiers and the town-folk expelled the Chinese community by sacking and burning the Chinatown.

During and after the Mexican Revolution, the Roman Catholic prejudices of Yellow Peril ideology facilitated racial discrimination and violence against Chinese Mexicans, usually for "stealing jobs" from native Mexicans. Anti–Chinese nativist propaganda misrepresented the Chinese people as unhygienic, prone to immorality (miscegenation, gambling, opium-smoking) and spreading diseases that would biologically corrupt and degenerate La Raza (the Mexican race) and generally undermining the Mexican patriarchy. In the first year alone, rebels and other Mexican citizens contributed to the deaths of some 324 Chinese. By 1919, another 129 had been killed in Mexico City, and 373 in Piedras Negras.

Moreover, from the racialist perspective, besides stealing work from Mexican men, Chinese men were stealing Mexican women from the native Mexican men who were away fighting the Revolution to overthrow and expel the dictator Porfirio Díaz and his foreign sponsors from Mexico. The persecution and violence against the Chinese in Mexico finally culminated in 1931, with the expulsion of the remaining Chinese from Sonora; approximately 70 per cent of the Chinese and the Chinese–Mexican population was expelled from the Mexican United States by the bureaucratic ethnic culling of the Mexican population.

=== Turkey ===
In 1908, at the end of the Ottoman Empire (1299–1922) the Young Turk Revolution ascended the Committee of Union and Progress (CUP) to power, which the 1913 Ottoman coup d'état reinforced with the Raid on the Sublime Porte. In admiration and emulation that the modernization of Japan during the Meiji Restoration (1868) was achieved without the Japanese people losing their national identity, the CUP intended to modernize Turkey into the "Japan of the Near East". To that end, the CUP considered allying Turkey with Japan in a geopolitical effort to unite the peoples of the Eastern world to fight a racial war of extermination against the White colonial empires of the West. Politically, the cultural, nationalist, and geopolitical affinities of Turkey and Japan were possible because, in Turkish culture, the "yellow" color of "Eastern gold" symbolizes the innate moral superiority of the East over the West.

Fear of the Yellow Peril occurs against the Chinese communities of Turkey, usually as political retaliation against the PRC government's repressions and human-rights abuses against the Muslim Uighur people in the Xinjiang province of China. At an anti–PRC political protest in Istanbul, a South Korean woman tourist faced violence, despite identifying herself: "I am not Chinese, I am Korean". In response that Yellow Peril racism in Turkey, Devlet Bahçeli, leader of the extreme right-wing Nationalist Movement Party, rhetorically asked: "How does one distinguish, between Chinese and Koreans? Both have slanted eyes".

=== South Africa ===
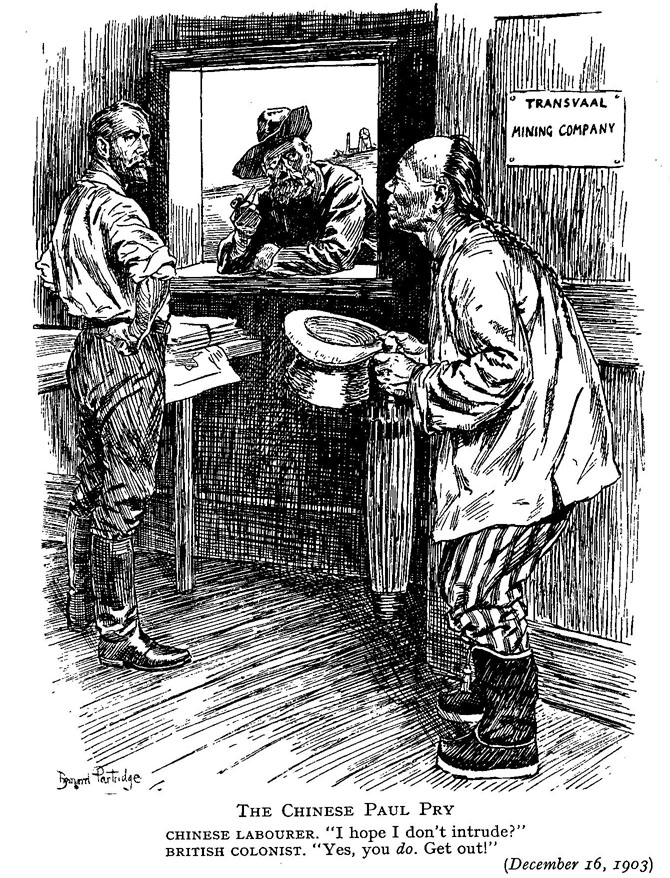
The Randlord's (mine owners') exploitive employment of Chinese labor contributed to the Liberal Party victory in the 1906 elections. (Punch magazine, 1903)

In 1904, after the conclusion of the Second Boer War, the Unionist Government of the Britain authorized the immigration to South Africa of approximately 63,000 Chinese laborers to work the gold mines in the Witwatersrand basin.

On 26 March 1904, approximately 80,000 people attended a social protest against the use of Chinese laborers in the Transvaal held in Hyde Park, London, to publicize the exploitation of Chinese South Africans. The Parliamentary Committee of the Trade Union Congress then passed a resolution declaring:

That this meeting, consisting of all classes of citizens of London, emphatically protests against the action of the Government in granting permission to import into South Africa indentured Chinese labor under conditions of slavery, and calls upon them to protect this new colony from the greed of capitalists and the Empire from degradation.

The mass immigration of indentured Chinese laborers to mine South African gold for wages lower than acceptable to the native white men, contributed to the 1906 electoral loss of the financially conservative British Unionist government that then governed South Africa.

After 1910, most Chinese miners were repatriated to China because of the great opposition to them, as "colored people" in white South Africa, analogous to anti-Chinese laws in the US during the early 20th century. Despite the racial violence between white South African miners and Chinese miners, the Unionist government achieved the economic recovery of South Africa after the Second Boer War by rendering the gold mines of the Witwatersrand Basin the most productive in the world.

=== New Zealand ===
In the late 19th and the early 20th centuries, populist Prime Minister Richard Seddon compared the Chinese people to monkeys, and so used the Yellow Peril to promote racialist politics in New Zealand. In 1879, in his first political speech, Seddon said that New Zealand did not wish her shores "deluged with Asiatic Tartars. I would sooner address white men than these Chinese. You can't talk to them, you can't reason with them. All you can get from them is 'No savvy'".

Moreover, in 1905, in the city of Wellington, the white supremacist Lionel Terry murdered Joe Kum Yung, an old Chinese man, in protest against Asian immigration to New Zealand. Laws promulgated to limit Chinese immigration included a heavy poll tax, introduced in 1881 and lowered in 1937, after Imperial Japan's invasion and occupation of China. In 1944, the poll tax was abolished, and in 2002 the New Zealand government formally apologized to the Chinese populace of New Zealand.

== Sexual fears ==
=== Background ===
The core of Yellow Peril ideology is the White man's fear of seduction by the Oriental nonwhite Other; either the sexual voracity of the Dragon Lady and the Lotus Blossom stereotypes, or the sexual voracity of the Seducer. Racist revulsion towards miscegenation—interracial sexual intercourse—by the fear of mixed-race children as a physical, cultural, and existential threat to Whiteness proper. In Queer theory, the term Oriental connotes contradictory sexual associations according to the nationality. A person can be perceived as Japanese and kinky, or as Filipino and available. Sometimes, Oriental could be sexless.

=== The seducer ===
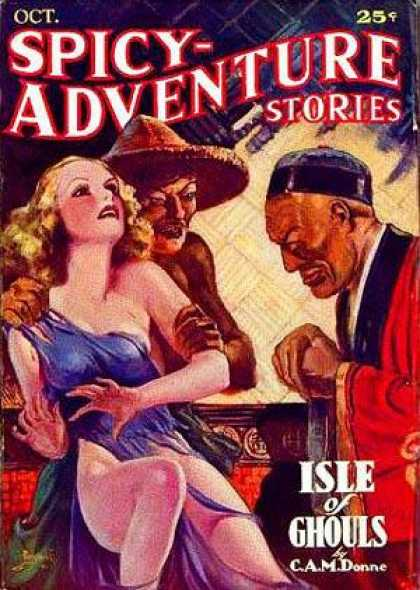
Stories showing Asian men as a threat to white women, such as this issue of Spicy-Adventure Stories, were common in the early 20th century.

The seductive Asian man (wealthy and cultured) was the common White male fear of the Asian sexual "other." The Yellow Peril sexual threat was realized by way of successful sexual competition, usually seduction or rape, which rendered the woman a sexual untouchable. (see: 55 Days at Peking, 1963) In Romance and the "Yellow Peril": Race, Sex, and Discursive Strategies in Hollywood Fiction (1994) the critic Gary Hoppenstand identified interracial sexual-intercourse as a threat to whiteness:

The threat of rape, the rape of white society dominated the yellow formula. The British or American hero, during the course of his battle against the yellow peril, overcomes numerous traps and obstacles in order to save his civilization, and the primary symbol of that civilization: white women. Stories featuring the Yellow Peril were arguments for white purity. Certainly, the potential union of the Oriental and white implied at best, a form of beastly sodomy, and at worse, a Satanic marriage. The Yellow Peril stereotype easily became incorporated into Christian mythology, and the Oriental assumed the role of the devil or demon. The Oriental rape of white woman signified a spiritual damnation for the women, and at the larger level, white society.

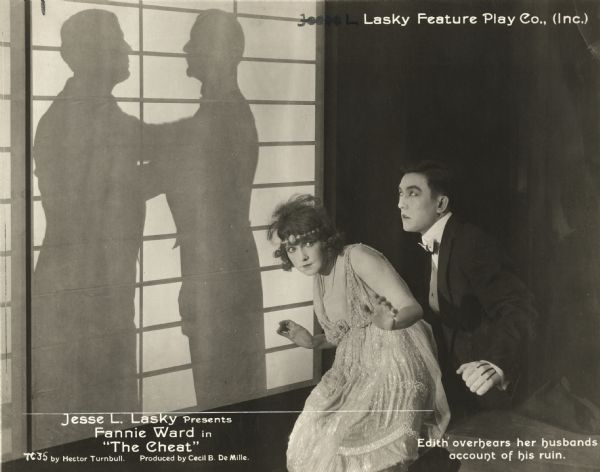
Edith Hardy (Fannie Ward) and Hishuru Tori (Sessue Hayakawa) in The Cheat (1915)

- In The Cheat (1915), Hishuru Tori (Sessue Hayakawa) is a sadistic Japanese sexual predator interested in Edith Hardy (Fannie Ward), an American housewife. Although superficially Westernized, Tori's sexual sadism reflects his true identity as an Asian. In being "brutal and cultivated, wealthy and base, cultured and barbaric, Tori embodies the contradictory qualities Americans associate with Japan". The story initially presents Tori as an "asexual" man associating among the high society of Long Island. Once Edith is in his private study, decorated with Japanese art, Tori is a man of "brooding, implicitly sadistic sexuality". Before Tori attempts his rape-seduction of Edith, the story implies she corresponds his sexual interest. The commercial success of The Cheat (1915) was ensured by Sessue Hayakawa, a male sex symbol of that time; a sexual threat to the WASP racial hierarchy in 1915.
- In Shanghai Express (1932), General Henry Chang (Warner Oland) is a warlord of Eurasian origin, presented as an asexual man, which excludes him from Western sexual mores and the racialist hierarchy; thus, he is dangerous to the Westerners he holds hostage. Although Eurasian, Chang is prouder of his Chinese heritage, and rejects his American heritage, which rejection confirms his Oriental identity. In 1931, the Chinese Civil War has rendered trapped a group of Westerners into traverse China by train, from Beijing to Shanghai, which is hijacked by Chang's soldiers. The story implies that Gen. Chang is a bisexual man who desires to rape both the heroine and the hero, Shanghai Lily (Marlene Dietrich) and Captain Donald "Doc" Harvey (Clive Brook). At the story's climax, Hui Fei kills Gen. Chang to save Harvey from being blinded; she explains that killing Chang restored the self-respect he took from her. Throughout the story, the narrative indicates that Shanghai Lily and Hui Fei are more attracted to each other than to Capt. Harvey, which was daring drama in 1932, because Western mores considered bisexuality an unnatural sexual orientation.

=== The Dragon Lady ===
As a cultural representation of voracious Asian sexuality, the Dragon Lady is a beautiful, charming woman who readily and easily dominates men. For the White man, the Dragon Lady is the sexual Other who represents morally degrading sexual desire. In the cinematic genre of the Western, the cowboy town usually features a scheming Asian prostitute who uses her prettiness, sex appeal, and charisma to beguile and dominate the White man. In the U.S. television program Ally McBeal (1997–2002), the Ling Woo character was a Dragon Lady whose Chinese identity includes sexual skills that no white woman possess. In the late 20th century, such a sexual representation of the Yellow Peril, which was introduced in the comic strip Terry and the Pirates (1936), indicates that in the Western imagination, Asia remains the land of the sexual nonwhite Other. To the Westerner, the seductiveness of the Orient implies spiritual threat and hidden danger to white sexual identity.

=== The Lotus Blossom ===
A variant Yellow Peril seductress is presented in the white savior romance between a "White Knight" from the West and a "Lotus Blossom" from the East; each redeems the other by way of mutual romantic love. Despite being a threat to the passive sexuality of white women, the romantic narrative favorably portrays the Lotus Blossom character as a woman who needs the love of a white man to rescue her from objectification by a flawed Asian culture. As a heroine, the Lotus Blossom woman is an ultra-feminine model of Asian pulchritude, social grace, and culture, whose own people trapped her in an inferior, gender-determined social-class. Only a white man can rescue her from such a cultural impasse, thereby, the narrative reaffirms the moral superiority of the Western world.

==== Suzie Wong ====
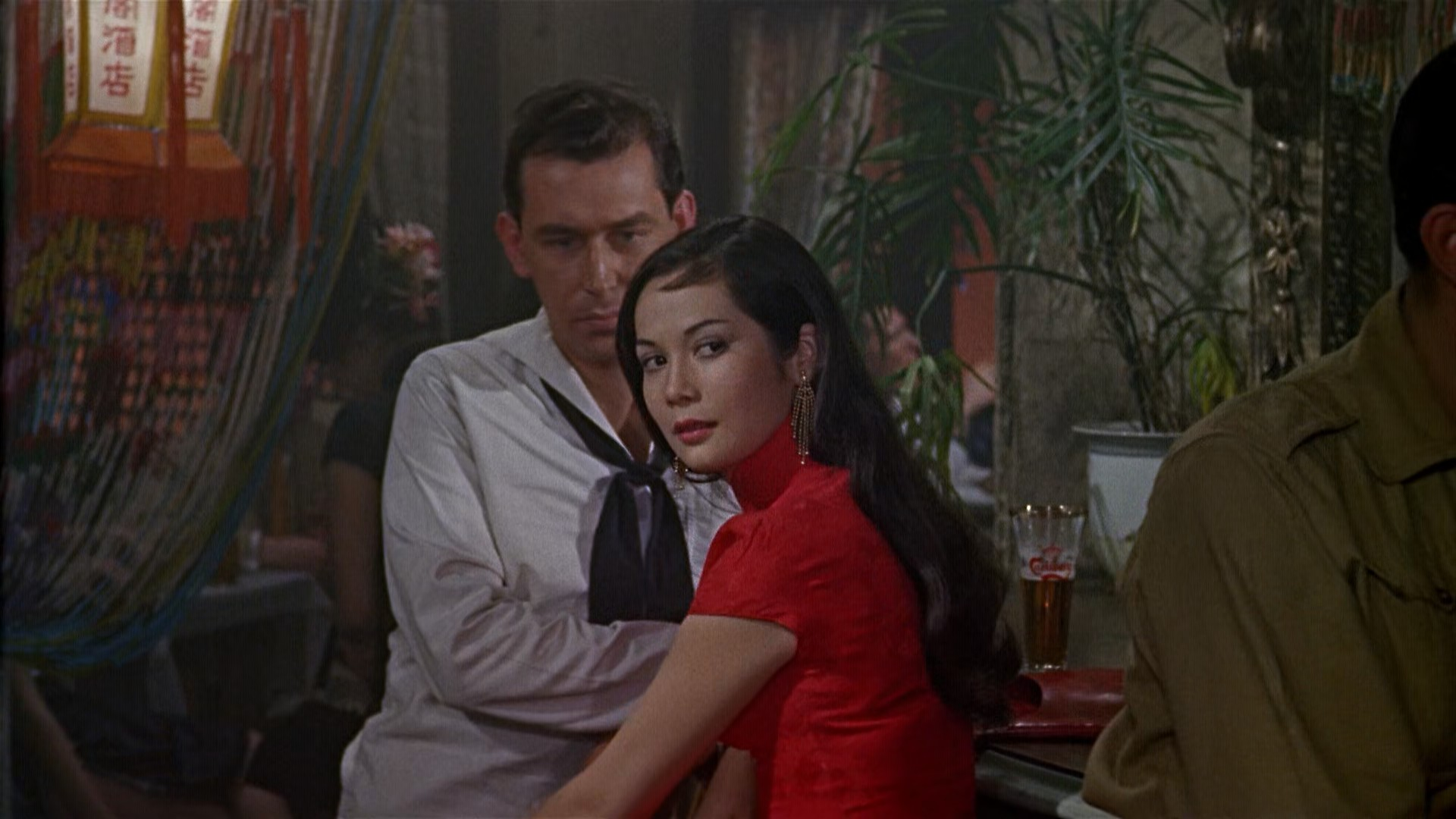
The prostitute Suzie Wong (Nancy Kwan) working a sailor to earn her keep. (The World of Suzie Wong, 1960)

In The World of Suzie Wong (1960), the eponymous antiheroine is a prostitute saved by the love of Robert Lomax (William Holden), an American painter living in Hong Kong. The East–West sexual differences available to Lomax are two: (i) the educated British woman Kay O'Neill (Sylvia Syms) who is independent and career-minded; and (ii) the poor Chinese woman Suzie Wong (Nancy Kwan), a sexual prostitute who is conventionally pretty, feminine, and submissive. The cultural contrast of the representations of Suzie Wong and Kay O'Neill imply that to win the love of a white man, a Western woman should emulate the sexually passive prostitute rather than an independent career-woman. As an Oriental stereotype, the submissive Lotus -Blossom (Wong) "proudly displays signs of a beating, to her fellow hookers, and uses it as evidence that her man loves her", which further increases Lomax's white savior desire to rescue Suzy.

Psychologically, the painter Lomax needs the prostitute Wong as the muse who inspires the self-discipline necessary for commercial success. Suzie Wong is an illiterate orphan who was sexually abused as a girl; thus her toleration of abuse by most of her Chinese clients. Unlike the Chinese and British men for whom Suzy Wong is a sexual object, Lomax is portrayed as enlightened, which implies the moral superiority of American culture, and thus that U.S. hegemony (geopolitical and cultural) shall be better than British hegemony. When a British sailor attempts to rape the prostitute Suzy Wong, the chivalrous American Lomax rescues her and beats up the sailor, whilst Chinese men are indifferent to the rape of a prostitute. As a Lotus Blossom stereotype, the prostitute Suzie Wong is a single mother. In contrast to the British and Chinese mistreatment (emotional and physical) of Wong, the white savior Lomax idealizes her as a child–woman, and saves her with the Lotus Blossom social identity, a sexually passive woman who is psychologically submissive to paternalism. Yet Lomax's love is conditional; throughout the story, Wong wears a Cheongsam dress, but when she wears Western clothes, Lomax orders her to only wear Chinese clothes, because Suzie Wong is acceptable only as a Lotus Blossom stereotype.

==== Kim ====
The musical Miss Saigon (1989), portrays Vietnam as a Third World country in need of a white savior. The opening chorus of the first song, "The Heat's on Saigon", begins thus: "The heat's on Saigon / The girls are hotter 'n hell / Tonight one of these slits will be Miss Saigon / God, the tension is high / Not to mention the smell". In Saigon City, presents the adolescent prostitute Kim as a stereotypical "Lotus Blossom" whose human identity is defined by her loving the white man Chris Scoyy, who is a marine. The story of Miss Saigon portrays Vietnamese women as two stereotypes, the sexually aggressive Dragon Lady and the sexually passive Lotus Blossom. In Thailand, Miss Saigon misrepresents most every Thai women as a prostitute. At the Dreamland brothel, the Vietnamese woman Kim is the only prostitute to not present herself in a bikini swimsuit to the clients.

== Literary Yellow Peril ==
=== Novels ===
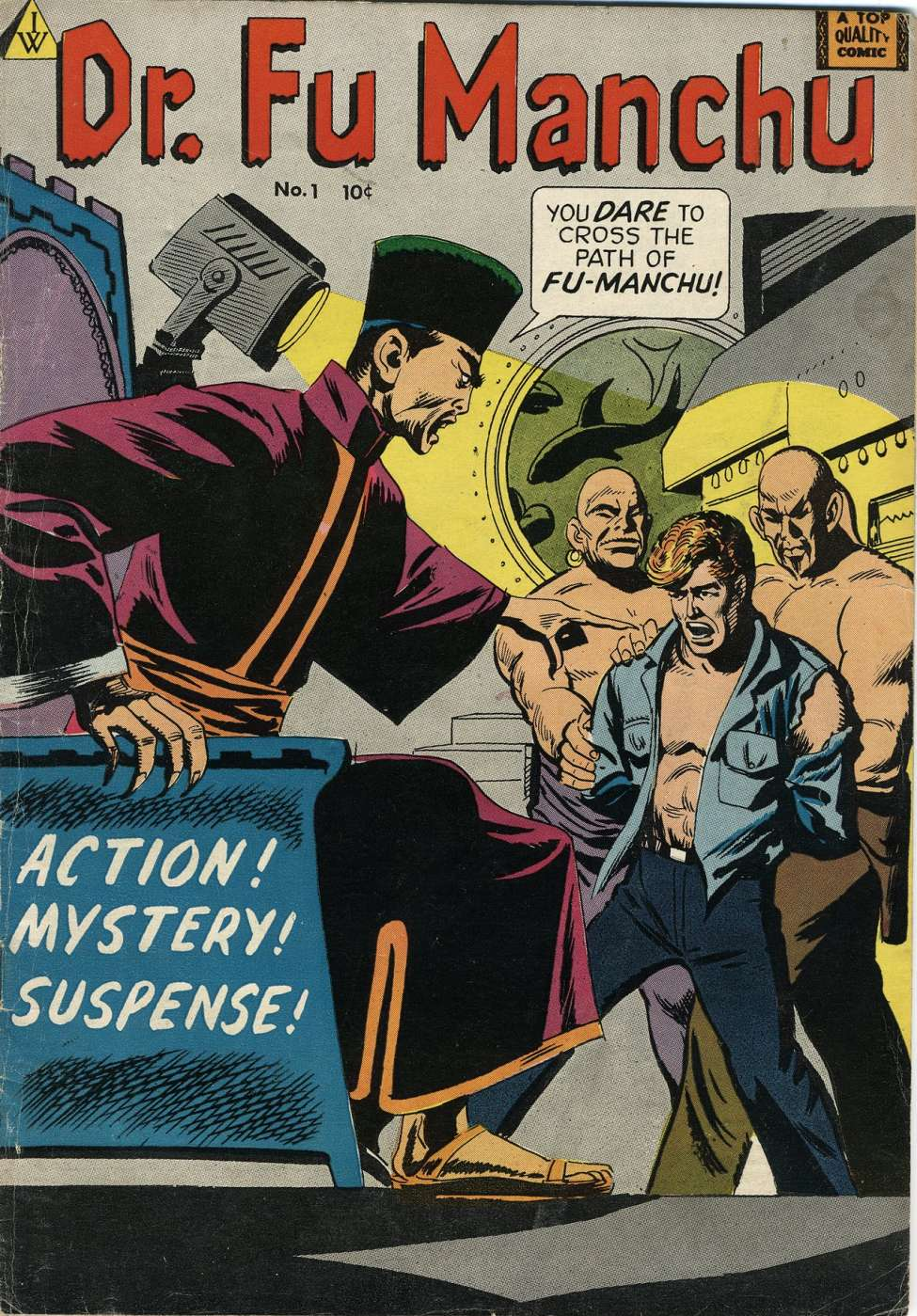
Dr. Fu Manchu (1958) is an example of Yellow Peril ideology for children. (art by Carl Burgos)

The Yellow Peril was a common subject for 19th-century adventure fiction, of which Dr. Fu Manchu is the representative villain, created in the likeness of the villain in the novel The Yellow Danger; Or, what Might Happen in the Division of the Chinese Empire Should Estrange all European Countries (1898), by M. P. Shiel. The Chinese gangster Fu Manchu is a mad scientist intent upon conquering the world, but is continually foiled by the British policeman Sir Denis Nayland Smith and his companion Dr. Petrie, in thirteen novels (1913–59), by Sax Rohmer.

Fu Manchu heads the Si-Fan, an international criminal organization and a pan-Asian gang of murderers recruited from the "darkest places of the East". The plots of the novels feature the recurring scene of Fu Manchu dispatching assassins (usually Chinese or Indian) to kill Nayland Smith and Dr. Petrie. In the course of adventure, Nayland-Smith and Petrie are surrounded by murderous colored men, Rohmer's Yellow Peril metaphor for Western trespass against the East. In the context of the Fu Manchu series, and Shiel's influence, reviewer Jack Adrian described Sax Rohmer as a

shameless inflater of a peril that was no peril at all ... into an absurd global conspiracy. He had not even the excuse ... of his predecessor in this shabby lie, M.P. Shiel, who was a vigorous racist, sometimes exhibiting a hatred and horror of Jews and Far Eastern races. Rohmer's own racism was careless and casual, a mere symptom of the times.

Yellow Peril: The Adventures of Sir John Weymouth–Smythe (1978), by Richard Jaccoma, is a pastiche of the Fu Manchu novels. Set in the 1930s, the story is a distillation of the Dragon Lady seductress stereotype and of the ruthless Mongols who threaten the West. The first-person narrative is by Sir John Weymouth–Smythe, an antihero who is a lecher and a prude, continually torn between sensual desire and Victorian prudery. The plot is the quest for the Spear of Destiny, a relic with supernatural power, which gives the possessor control of the world. Throughout the story, Weymouth–Smythe spends much time battling the villain, Chou en Shu, for possession of the Spear of Destiny. Thematic developments reveal that true villain are but the (Nazi). ostensible allies of Weymouth–Smythe. The Nazis leaders is Clara Schicksal, a Teutonic blonde woman who sacrifices Myanma boys to ancient German gods, whilst fellating them; later, in punishment, Weymouth–Symthe sodomizes Clara.

The Yellow Peril (1989), by Bao Mi (Wang Lixiong) presents a civil war in the People's Republic of China that escalates to internal nuclear warfare, which then escalates into the Third World War. Published after the Tiananmen Square protests of 1989, the political narrative of Yellow Peril presents the dissident politics of anti–Communist Chinese, and consequently was suppressed by the Chinese government.

=== Short stories ===
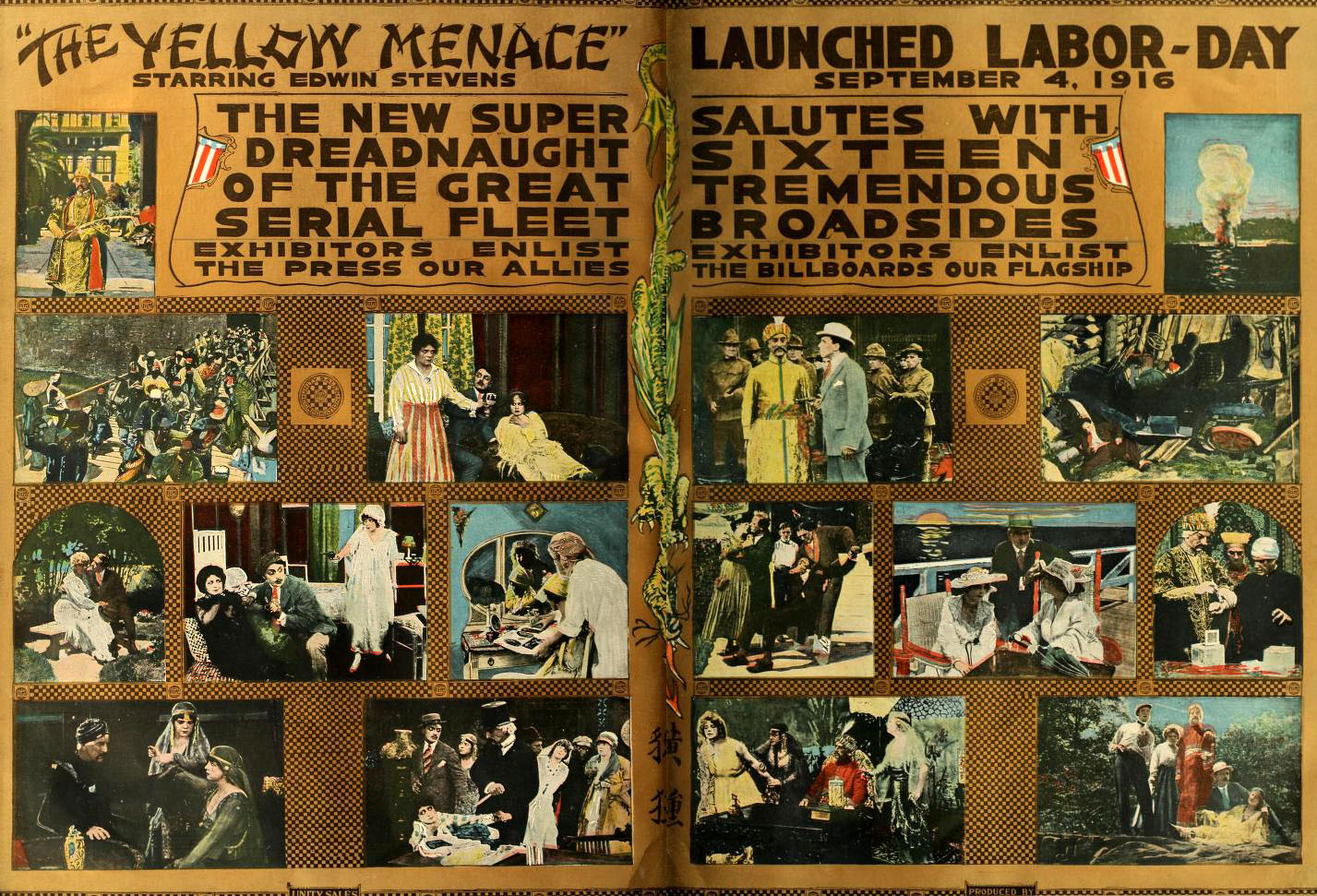
In The Yellow Menace film serial, Asian villains threaten the white heroine. (September 1916)

- The Infernal War (La Guerre infernale, 1908), by Pierre Giffard, illustrated by Albert Robida, is a science fiction story that depicts a War as a fight among the empires of the White man, which distraction allows China to invade Russia, and Japan to invade the U.S. In support of Yellow Peril racism, Robida's illustrations depict the cruelties and tortures that Asians inflict upon the White man, Russian and American.
- In "Under the Ban of Li Shoon" (1916) and "Li Shoon's Deadliest Mission" (1916), H. Irving Hancock introduced the villain Li Shoon, a "tall and stout" man with "a round, moon-like yellow face" with "bulging eyebrows" above "sunken eyes". Personally, Li Shoon is "an amazing compound of evil" and intellect, which makes him "a wonder at everything wicked" and "a marvel of satanic cunning."
- The Peril of the Pacific (1916), by J. Allan Dunn, describes a fantastical, 1920 Japanese invasion of the U.S. mainland realized by an alliance between treasonous Japanese-Americans and the Imperial Japanese Navy. The racist language of J. Allan Dunn's narrative communicates the irrational, Yellow Peril fear of and about Japanese-American citizens in California, who were exempt from arbitrary deportation by the Gentlemen's Agreement of 1907.
- "The Unparalleled Invasion" (1910), by Jack London, set between 1976 and 1987, shows China conquering and colonizing neighboring countries. In self-defense, the Western World retaliate with biological warfare. Western armies and navies kill the Chinese refugees at the border, and punitive expeditions kill the survivors in China. London describes this war of extermination as necessary to the white settler colonialism of China, in accordance with "the democratic American program".
- In "He" (1926), by H. P. Lovecraft, the protagonist white-man is allowed to see the future of planet Earth, and sees "yellow men" triumphantly dancing among the ruins of the White man's world. In "The Horror at Red Hook" (1927), features Red Hook, New York, as a place were "slant-eyed immigrants practice nameless rites in honor of heathen gods by the light of the moon."

== Cinema ==
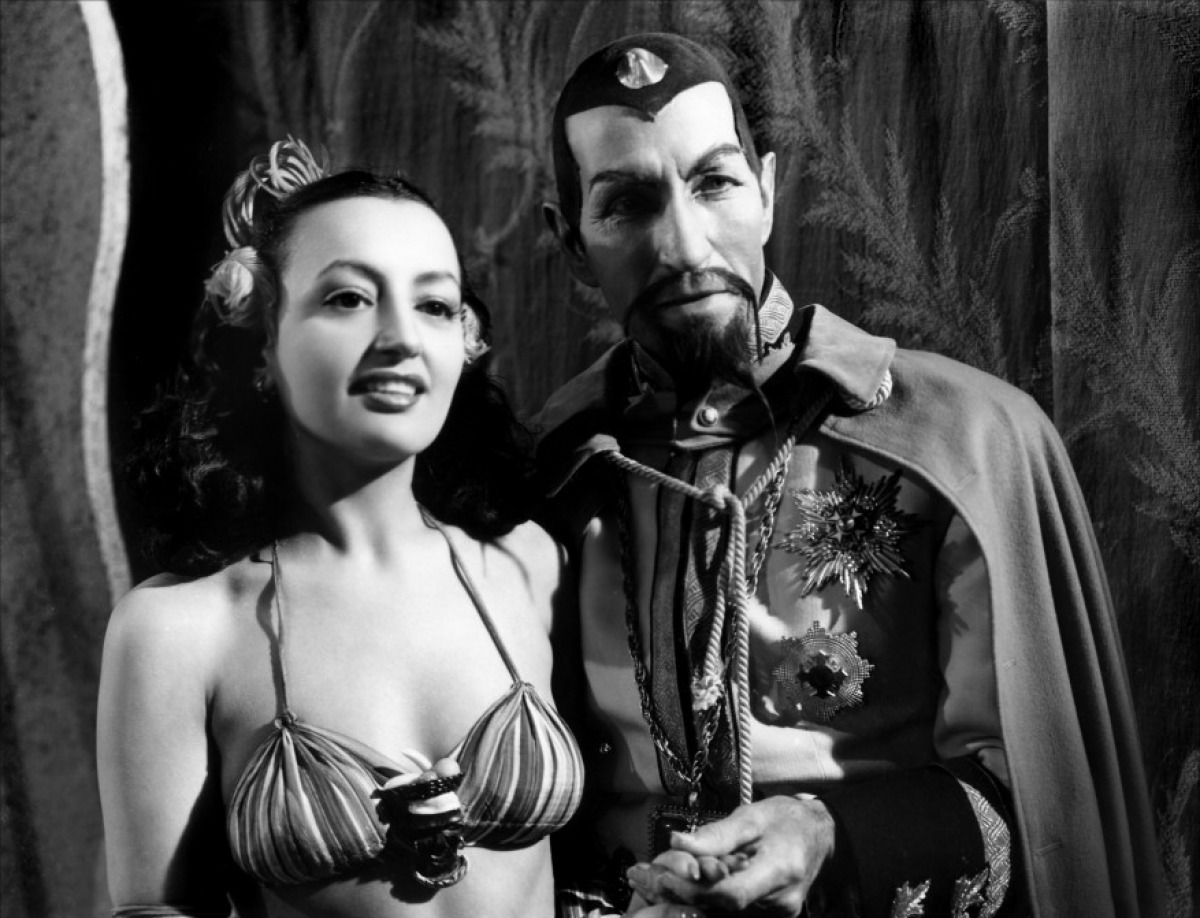
The Yellow Peril Future: In Flash Gordon Conquers the Universe (1940), Ming the Merciless (Charles Middleton) and a concubine (Carmen D'Antonio).

In the 1930s, American cinema (Hollywood) presented contradictory images of East Asian men: (i) The malevolent master-criminal, Dr. Fu Manchu; and (ii) The benevolent master-detective, Charlie Chan. Fu Manchu is "[Sax] Rohmer's concoction of cunning Asian villainy [that] connects with the irrational fears of proliferation and incursion: Racist myths often carried by the water imagery of flood, deluge, the tidal waves of immigrants, rivers of blood."

The Mask of Fu Manchu (1932) shows that the white man's sexual-anxiety is one of the bases of Yellow Peril fear, especially when Fu Manchu (Boris Karloff) urges his Asian army to "Kill the white man and take his women!" Moreover, as an example of "unnatural" sexual relations among Asians, father–daughter incest is a recurrent, narrative theme of The Mask of Fu Manchu, communicated by the ambiguous relations between Fu Manchu and Fah Lo See (Myrna Loy), his daughter.

In 1936, when the Nazis banned the novels of Sax Rohmer in Germany, because they believed him Jewish, Rohmer denied being racist and published a letter declaring himself "a good Irishman", yet was disingenuous about the why of the Nazi book-ban, because "my stories are not inimical to Nazi ideals." In science fiction cinema, the "futuristic Yellow Peril" is embodied by Emperor Ming the Merciless is an iteration of the Fu Manchu trope who is the nemesis of the Flash Gordon; likewise, Buck Rogers fights against the Mongol Reds, a Yellow Peril who conquered the U.S. in the 25th century.

== Comic books ==
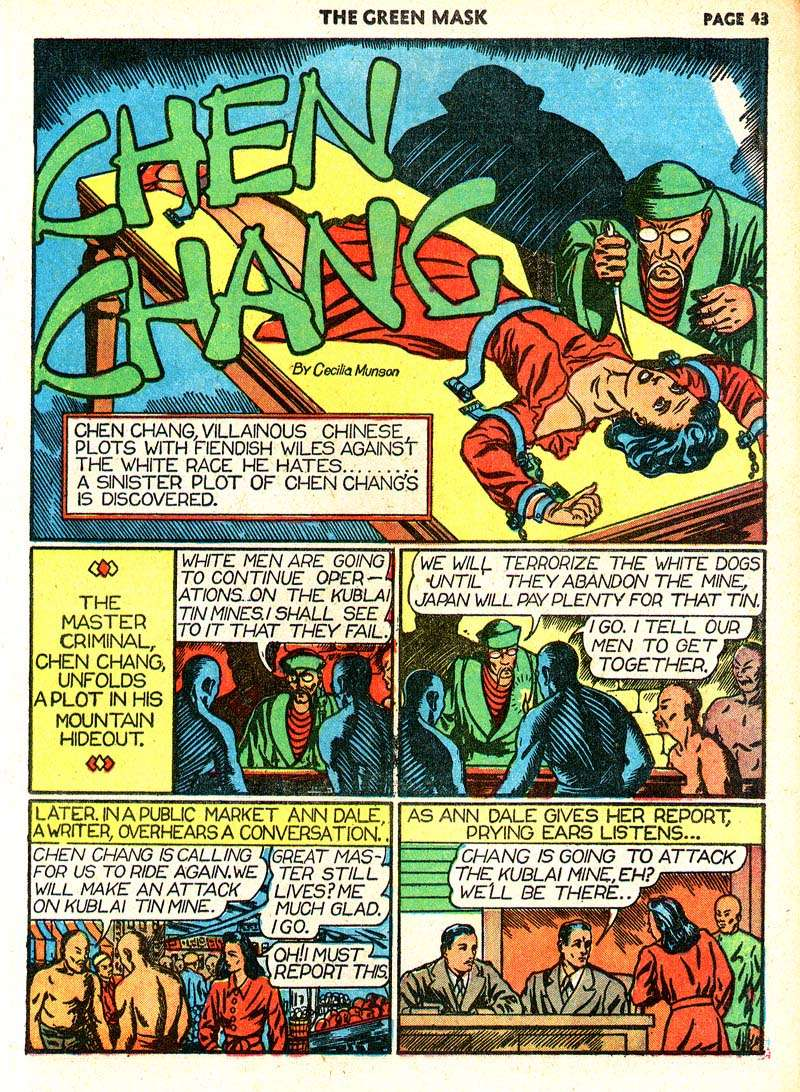
The Green Mask#6 p. 43, August 1941, Fox Feature Syndicate, art by Munson Paddock

In 1937, the publisher DC Comics featured "Ching Lung" on the cover and in the first issue of Detective Comics (March 1937). Years later, the character would be revisited in New Super-Man (June 2017), where his true identity is revealed to be All-Yang, the villainous twin brother of I-Ching, who deliberately cultivated the Yellow Peril image of Ching Lung to show Super-Man how the West caricaturized and vilified the Chinese.

In the late 1950s, Atlas Comics (Marvel Comics) published Yellow Claw, a pastiche of the Fu Manchu stories. Unusually for the time, the racist imagery was counterbalanced by the Asian-American FBI agent, Jimmy Woo, as his principal opponent.

In 1964, Stan Lee and Don Heck introduced, in Tales of Suspense, the Mandarin, a Yellow Peril-inspired supervillain and archenemy of Marvel Comics superhero Iron Man. In Iron Man 3 (2013), set in the Marvel Cinematic Universe, the Mandarin appears as the leader of the Ten Rings terrorist organization. Hero Tony Stark (played by Robert Downey, Jr.) discovers that the Mandarin is an English actor, Trevor Slattery (Ben Kingsley), who was hired by Aldrich Killian (Guy Pearce) as a cover for his own criminal activities. According to director Shane Black and screenwriter Drew Pearce, making the Mandarin an impostor avoided Yellow Peril stereotyping while modernizing it with a message about the use of fear by the military industrial complex.

In the 1970s, DC Comics introduced a clear Fu Manchu analogue in supervillain Ra's al Ghul, created by Dennis O'Neil, Neal Adams and Julius Schwartz. While maintaining a level of racial ambiguity, the character's signature Fu Manchu beard and "Chinaman" clothing made him an instance of Yellow Peril stereotyping. When adapting the character for Batman Begins, screenwriter David Koepp and director Christopher Nolan had Ken Watanabe play an imposter Ra's al Ghul to distract from his true persona, played by Liam Neeson. As with Iron Man 3, this was done to avoid the problematic origins of the character, making them a deliberate fake rather than a true portrayal of a different culture's insidious designs.

Marvel Comics used Fu Manchu as the principal foe of his son, Shang-Chi, Master of Kung Fu. As the result of Marvel Comics later losing the rights to the Fu Manchu name, his later appearances give him the real name of Zheng Zu. The Marvel Cinematic Universe film Shang-Chi and the Legend of the Ten Rings (2021) replaces Fu Manchu with Xu Wenwu (Tony Leung), an original character partially inspired by Zheng Zu and the Mandarin; thus downplaying yellow peril implications as Wenwu is opposed by an Asian superhero, his son Shang-Chi (Simu Liu), rather than Tony Stark, while omitting references to the Fu Manchu character.

== See also ==
- Alien land laws
- Anti-Asian racism in the United States
- Chinese head tax
- Anti-Chinese sentiment
- China threat theory
- Chinese virus (politics)
- Dusky Peril
- Examples of Yellowface
- Japanese Problem
- Le Péril jaune
- Model minority
- Red Chinese Battle Plan
- Sinophobia
- Stereotypes of East Asians in the United States
- Techno-Orientalism
- The White Man's Burden
- White Australia policy
- Xenophobia and racism related to the COVID-19 pandemic
