= Konstanze von Schulthess =

German author (born 1945)

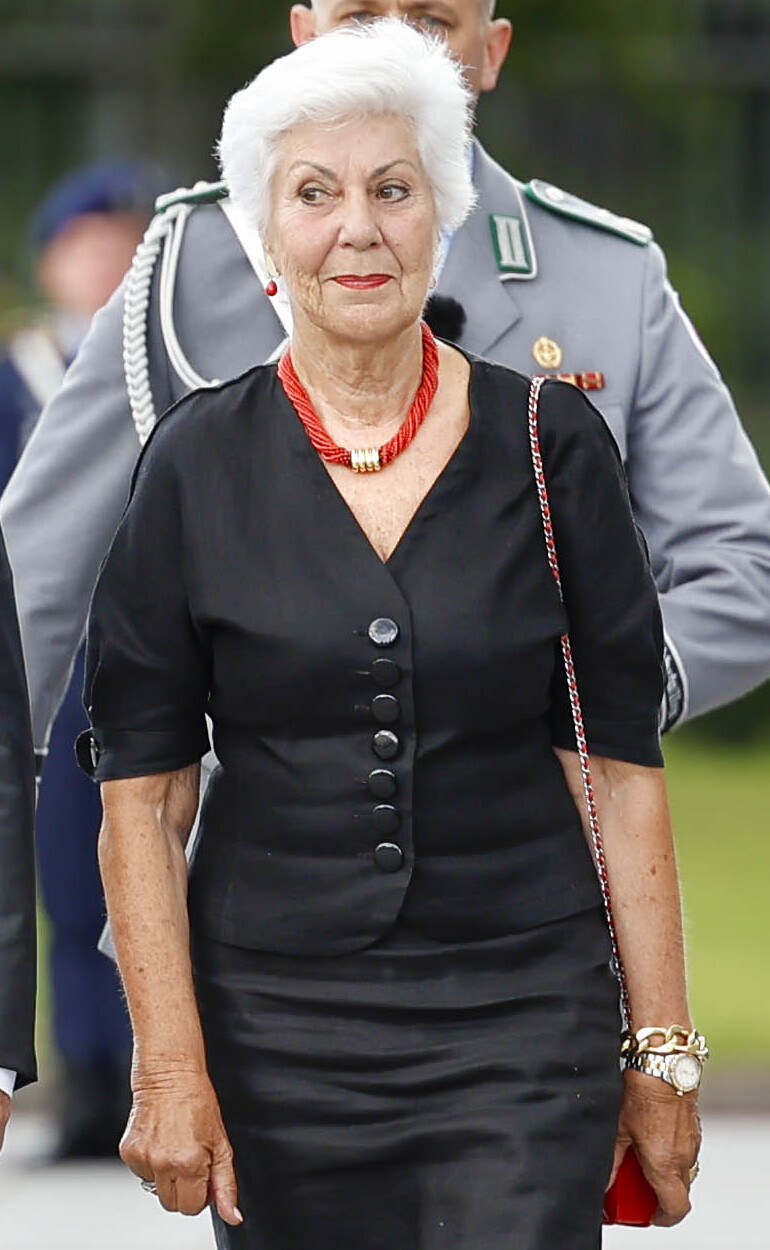
Von Schulthess-Rechberh in 2023

Konstanze von Schulthess-Rechberg (born 27 January 1945) is a German author. She is the daughter of World War II colonel and resistance member Claus von Stauffenberg.

== Early life ==
Konstanze von Schulthess-Rechberg, born Konstanze Schenk Gräfin von Stauffenberg on 27 January 1945, is the youngest child of Operation Valkyrie leader Colonel Claus Schenk Graf von Stauffenberg (1907–1944), a member of the traditional German nobility, and his wife, Baroness "Nina" von Lerchenfeld (1913–2006). She was born in a Nazi maternity center in Frankfurt an der Oder, Brandenburg, where her mother had been transferred for childbirth from the Ravensbrück concentration camp. Countess Nina, who was pregnant with her fifth child at the time of the failed plot to assassinate Adolf Hitler and remove the Nazi Party from power on 20 July 1944, for which her husband was summarily executed, had been arrested and imprisoned in the aftermath of the assassination attempt. Konstanze was born seven months after her father was executed.

== Biography ==
After the war, Konstanze and her four older siblings – Berthold (1934), Heimeran (1936–2020), Franz-Ludwig (1938), and Valerie (1940–1966), who had been placed in an orphanage in Bad Sachsa, Lower Saxony, under the surname of Meister, upon their mother’s arrest by the Gestapo – were reunited with their mother at the Stauffenberg family seat in Lautlingen in Baden-Württemberg. Together, they returned to their mother’s hometown of Bamberg, Bavaria.

Konstanze, who has lived in Switzerland since 1965, trained as a maternity nurse. She wrote a biography of her mother, Nina Schenk Gräfin von Stauffenberg: ein Porträt, that was published in 2008 (in German).

Married since 1967, Konstanze and her husband Dietrich von Schulthess-Rechberg (1937) have four children. Their son, Philipp von Schulthess (born 1973), is an actor who played a supporting role in the 2008 film Valkyrie: a depiction of the failed plot in which Philipp's grandfather was involved. When it was announced that the film would feature US actor Tom Cruise as Claus von Stauffenberg, Konstanze's brother Berthold, the eldest of the Stauffenbergs, expressed an apprehension that the film might become "horrible kitsch".

== Works ==
- Schulthess, Konstanze von (2008). Nina Schenk Gräfin von Stauffenberg: ein Porträt (in German). Munich: Pendo. ISBN 978-3-858-42652-9. OCLC 226355136.
