= A Rumor of War =

A Rumor of War may refer to:

- A Rumor of War (book)
- A Rumor of War (miniseries)
