= The Plot to Kill Hitler =

1990 American television film

- Title card
- Written by: Steven Elkins
- Directed by: Lawrence Schiller
- Starring: Brad Davis; Ian Richardson; Michael Byrne; Rupert Graves; Helmut Griem
- Music by: Laurence Rosenthal
- Country of origin: United States
- Original language: English

Production
- Producers: Alfred R. Kelman; Bernard Sofronski
- Cinematography: Freddie Francis
- Editor: Bernard Gribble
- Running time: 93 minutes

Original release
- Release: January 30, 1990

The Plot to Kill Hitler is a 1990 television film based on the July 20 plot by German High Command to kill Adolf Hitler in 1944. Brad Davis stars as Colonel Claus Schenk Graf von Stauffenberg, who plants a bomb in the conference room of the Führer's headquarters in East Prussia.

== Plot summary ==
Led by Army Colonel Claus von Stauffenberg, several German High Command officers plan to assassinate Adolf Hitler and take control of the German government, with the ultimate intention of surrendering their country to the Allies. Stauffenberg manages to plant a bomb, hidden in his briefcase, in Hitler's battlefield headquarters. By sheer luck, Heinz Brandt unwittingly moves the briefcase slightly, and Hitler survives the subsequent blast. In the final hours of July 20, 1944, Stauffenberg, Lieutenant Werner von Haeften, General Friedrich Olbricht, Ludwig Beck, and Colonel Albrecht Mertz von Quirnheim are arrested and tried. Beck commits suicide, and the rest are taken to be executed. Stauffenberg declares "Long live the sacred Germany!" before being killed, and the others are also killed beside him within seconds. The film ends when Hitler announces his survival with Nina and her son Berthold hearing of the news.

== Cast ==
- Brad Davis as Colonel Claus von Stauffenberg
- Madolyn Smith as Nina von Stauffenberg
- Ian Richardson as General Ludwig Beck
- Kenneth Colley as Field Marshal Wilhelm Keitel
- Michael Byrne as General Friedrich Olbricht
- Helmuth Lohner as General Friedrich Fromm
- Jonathan Hyde as Dr. Joseph Goebbels
- Rupert Graves as Axel von dem Bussche
- Helmut Griem as Field Marshal Erwin Rommel
- Mike Gwilym as Adolf Hitler
- Vernon Dobtcheff as General Erich Fellgiebel
- Christoph Eichhorn as General Helmuth Stieff
- Michael Fitzegerald as Major Ernst John von Freyend
- Jack Hedley as General Adolf Heusinger
- Heather Chasen as The Baroness
- Burkhard Heyl as Colonel Albrecht Mertz von Quirnheim
- Timothy Watson as Major Ernst Remer

== Production ==
The movie was filmed in the United States and Zagreb, Yugoslavia.

== Reception ==
The Courier-News said the movie "had authentic-looking period costumes and American and British actors painfully attempting to deliver German accents". They also complained that the "movie is bogged down with lengthy strategy meetings and the lack of chemistry between Davis and Madolyn Smith adds sluggish moments".
