= Nina Schenk Gräfin von Stauffenberg =

German noble (1913–2006)

- Born: Baroness Elisabeth Magdalena von Lerchenfeld; Elisabeth Magdalena Freiin von Lerchenfeld; 27 August 1913; Kowno, Russian Empire (now Kaunas, Lithuania)
- Died: 2 April 2006 (aged 92); Kirchlauter, near Bamberg, Bavaria, Germany
- Known for: Wife of Claus Schenk Graf von Stauffenberg, sister-in-law of Nazi test pilot and resistance supporter
- Title: Gräfin
- Children: 5, including Berthold, Franz-Ludwig and Konstanze

Elisabeth Magdalena (Nina) Schenk Gräfin von Stauffenberg (27 August 1913 – 2 April 2006) was the wife of Oberst Claus Schenk Graf von Stauffenberg, the leader of the failed plot to assassinate Adolf Hitler on 20 July 1944. Following the plot's failure and her husband's execution, she was arrested and imprisoned, during which time she delivered her youngest child.

== Biography ==
Born Elisabeth Magdalena Freiin von Lerchenfeld in Kowno, Imperial Russia (now Kaunas, Lithuania), in 1913, she was known by her nickname "Nina". She was the only child of Bavarian nobleman and politician General Consul Gustav Freiherr von Lerchenfeld (1871–1944) and his wife, Anna Elfriede Louise Freiin von Stackelberg (1879–1945). Her mother was a Baltic German noblewoman, great-granddaughter of Johan Mauritz Graf von Hauke, which made Nina a third cousin of Prince Philip, Duke of Edinburgh, consort of Queen Elizabeth II.

Nina von Lerchenfeld and Claus Schenk Graf von Stauffenberg were married on 26 September 1933 in Bamberg, Bavaria, making Nina the Countess (Gräfin) von Stauffenberg. Count Claus belonged to the House of Stauffenberg, an ancient Bavarian noble family. Although Nina's and Claus von Stauffenberg's mothers were both Lutherans, the couple's children were raised as Roman Catholics, in accordance with the wishes of Stauffenberg's father.

The marriage produced five children:

- Berthold Maria Schenk Graf von Stauffenberg (born 3 July 1934).
- Heimeran Schenk Graf von Stauffenberg (born 9 July 1936 in Bamberg, Bavaria – died 20 October 2020 in Zurich), unmarried and without issue.
- Franz-Ludwig Schenk Graf von Stauffenberg (born 4 May 1938).
- Valerie Ida Huberta Karoline Anna Maria Schenk Gräfin von Stauffenberg (born 15 November 1940 in Bamberg; died 4 June 1966 in Munich, Bavaria of leukemia), married Heino von L'Estocq (born 6 April 1935 in Potsdam, Brandenburg) on 4 April 1964.
- Konstanze Schenk Gräfin von Stauffenberg (born 27 January 1945 in Frankfurt an der Oder, Brandenburg), married Dietrich von Schulthess-Rechberg (born 13 October 1937 in Zurich, Switzerland) on 8 April 1967.

After her husband's failed attempt to assassinate Hitler (he was summarily executed the following evening), the Countess von Stauffenberg was arrested by the Gestapo and taken into custody under the ancient Sippenhaft law reinstated by the Nazi government. Her five children were placed in an orphanage in Bad Sachsa, Lower Saxony, under the surname of Meister. At the time of her husband's death, Stauffenberg was pregnant and gave birth while imprisoned in a Nazi maternity center in Frankfurt an der Oder. That same year, her own mother, Anna, died in a Soviet detention camp.

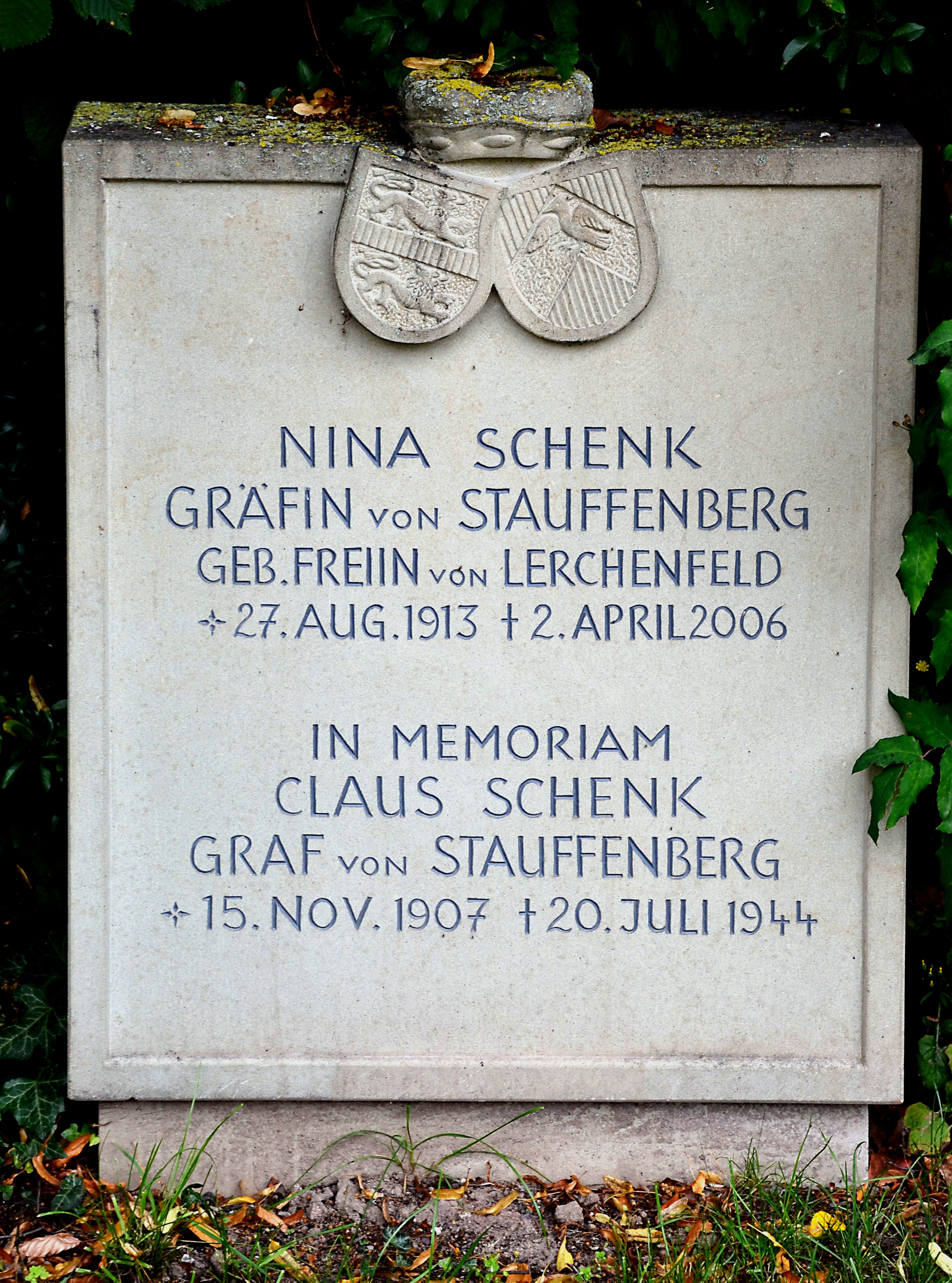
Nina Gräfin von Stauffenberg's grave.

By the end of the Second World War, Stauffenberg had been moved to the Italian province of South Tyrol. There she was held as a hostage in return for the redemption of Nazi property. After the war, she was reunited with her family at the Stauffenberg family seat in Lautlingen, Baden-Württemberg. She died in Kirchlauter, near Bamberg, Bavaria, on 2 April 2006 at the age of 92. The biography Nina Schenk Gräfin von Stauffenberg – Ein Porträt by Konstanze von Schulthess-Rechberg, Stauffenberg's youngest daughter, was published in 2008 (Munich: Pendo Verlag, ISBN 3-85842-652-0 / ISBN 978-3-85842-652-9).

== Sources ==
- (in German) Zeller, Eberhard (1994). Oberst Claus Graf Stauffenberg. Ein Lebensbild. Paderborn: Ferdinand Schöningh. ISBN 3-506-79770-0.
- (in German) Steffahn, Harald (2002). Stauffenberg. Hamburg: Rowohlt Taschenbuch Verlag Reinbek. ISBN 3-499-50520-7.
- (in German) Ueberschär, Gerd R. (2004). Stauffenberg. Der 20. Juli 1944. Frankfurt am Main: S. Fischer Verlag. ISBN 3-10-086003-9.
- (in German) Hassel, Fey von, "Niemals sich beugen". dtv.
- (in German) Meding, Dorothee von (1997). Mit dem Mut des Herzens – Die Frauen des 20. Juli. btb Verlag. ISBN 3-442-72171-7.
