= Berthold von Stauffenberg =

Berthold von Stauffenberg may refer to:

- Berthold Schenk Graf von Stauffenberg (1905-1944), German lawyer, conspirator in the 20 July Plot and brother to Claus Schenk Graf von Stauffenberg
- Berthold Maria Schenk Graf von Stauffenberg (born 1934), retired German military officer and oldest son of Claus Schenk Graf von Stauffenberg.
