= Claus von Stauffenberg =

German army officer (1907–1944)

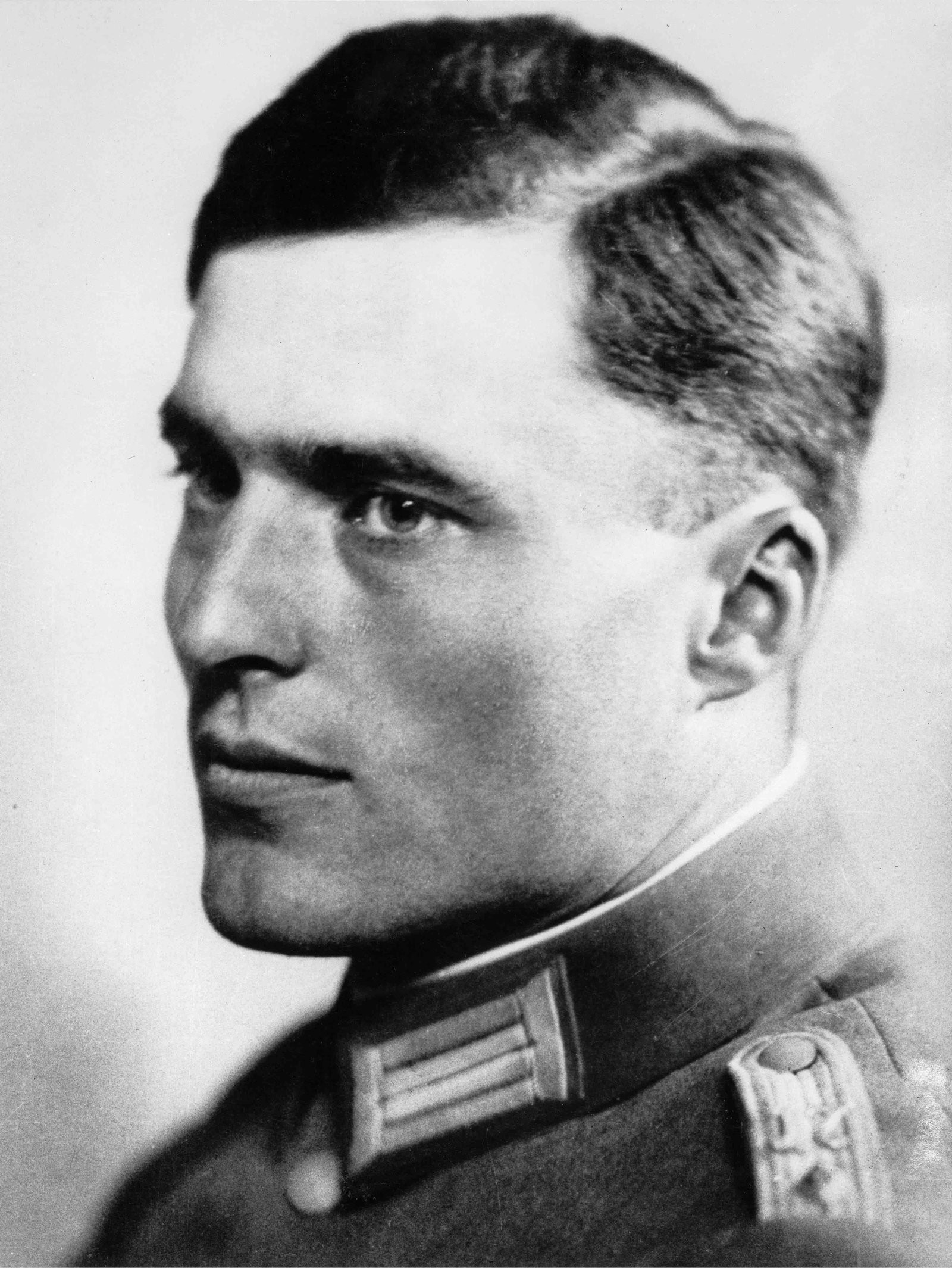
- 1934 portrait of Stauffenberg
- Born: Claus Philipp Maria Justinian Schenk Graf von Stauffenberg; 15 November 1907; Jettingen, Kingdom of Bavaria, German Empire
- Died: 21 July 1944 (aged 36); Berlin, Gau Berlin, Nazi Germany
- Cause of death: Execution by firing squad
- Spouse: Magdalena Freiin von Lerchenfeld (m. 1933)
- Children: 5, including Berthold, Franz-Ludwig and Konstanze
- Relatives: Stauffenberg family
- Military career
- Allegiance: Germany
- Branch: Reichswehr; German Army
- Years: 1926–1944
- Rank: Oberst
- Known for: 20 July plot
- Battles: World War II; Invasion of Poland; Battle of France; Operation Barbarossa; Tunisian campaign (WIA)

Claus Philipp Maria Justinian Schenk Graf von Stauffenberg (German: [ˈklaʊs fɔn ˈʃtaʊfn̩bɛʁk]; 15 November 1907 – 21 July 1944) was a German army officer who is best known for his failed attempt on 20 July 1944 to assassinate Adolf Hitler at the Wolf's Lair, part of Operation Valkyrie.

Born into the ancient House of Stauffenberg in the Kingdom of Bavaria, Stauffenberg took part in the invasion of Poland, the 1941–42 invasion of the Soviet Union in Operation Barbarossa and the Tunisian campaign, during which he was severely wounded, losing his left eye, right hand, and two fingers from his left hand. Alongside Major Generals Henning von Tresckow and Hans Oster, he became a key figure in the German resistance to Nazism within the Wehrmacht. Stauffenberg was central to the 20 July plot to assassinate Hitler and Operation Valkyrie, a plan to arrest the Nazi leadership following Hitler's death and negotiate an end to the Second World War.

On 20 July 1944, Stauffenberg's assassination attempt failed; the explosive he had placed only dealt Hitler minor injuries. The conspirators were arrested, and many of them executed, including Stauffenberg on the day after the attempt. His wife Nina was also arrested, giving birth to their fifth child Konstanze while imprisoned. Their children also included Berthold, who followed in his father's footsteps as a military man, and politician Franz-Ludwig.

== Early life and education ==
Stauffenberg was born in Stauffenberg Castle, Jettingen, on 15 November 1907 and baptised as Claus Philipp Maria Justinian. Born into the ancient House of Stauffenberg, he was the third of four sons of Alfred Schenk Graf (Count) von Stauffenberg (1860–1936), the last Oberhofmarschall of the Kingdom of Württemberg, and his wife, Caroline Gräfin (Countess) von Üxküll-Gyllenband (1875–1956), the daughter of Alfred Richard August Graf von Üxküll-Gyllenband (1838–1877) and Valerie von Hohenthal (1841–1878).

From birth, Stauffenberg inherited the hereditary titles of Graf and Schenk, leaving him referred to by his first name and Schenk Graf von Stauffenberg until the 1919 Weimar Constitutional Law abolished privileges of nobility. His maternal ancestors included Generalfeldmarschall August Graf von Gneisenau.

Stauffenberg grew up in Bavaria, where he and his brothers were members of the Neupfadfinder, a German Scout association and part of the German Youth movement.

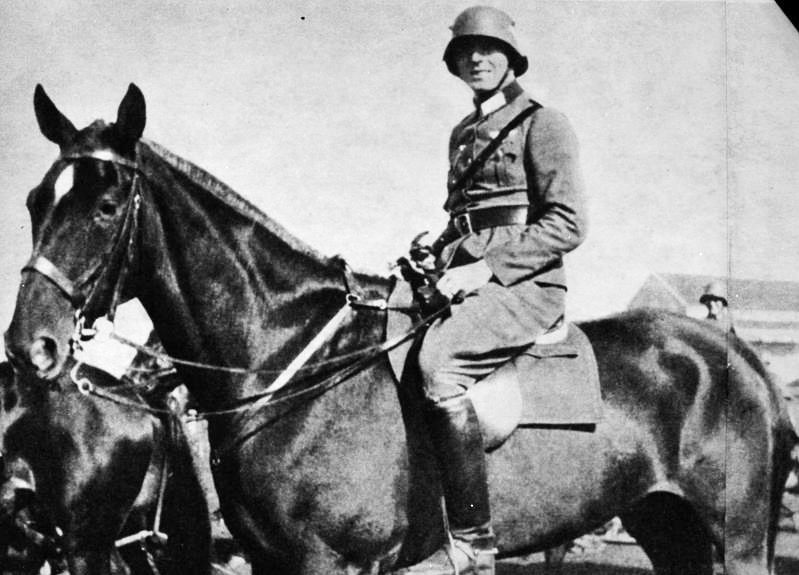
Stauffenberg with the 17th Cavalry Regiment in Bamberg

In 1926, Stauffenberg joined the family's traditional regiment, the Reiterregiment 17 (17th Cavalry Regiment) in Bamberg. Around the beginning of his time there, Albrecht von Blumenthal introduced the three brothers to the poet Stefan George's influential circle, Georgekreis, from which many notable members of the German resistance later emerged. George dedicated Das neue Reich ("the new Empire") in 1928, including the Geheimes Deutschland ("secret Germany") written in 1922, to Berthold.

By 1930, Stauffenberg had been commissioned as a leutnant (second lieutenant), studying modern weapons at the Kriegsakademie in Berlin, but remaining focused on the use of horses – which continued to carry out a large part of transportation duties throughout World War II—in modern warfare. His regiment became part of the German 1st Light Division under General Erich Hoepner, another later member of the covert German Resistance, and the unit was among the Wehrmacht troops that moved into Sudetenland following its annexation to the Reich as per the Munich Agreement.

=== Early views on Nazism ===
Though Stauffenberg had supported the German colonization of Poland and had made extremist remarks regarding Polish Jews, he refrained from joining the Nazi Party. However, during the 1932 German presidential election, he voiced tentative support for Hitler:

The idea of the Führer principle [...] bound together with a Volksgemeinschaft, the principle "The community good before the individual good," and the fight against corruption, the fight against the spirit of the large urban cities, the racial thought (Rassengedanke), and the will towards a new German-formed legal order appears to us healthy and auspicious.

Stauffenberg's views of Hitler were conflicted during this period. He vacillated between a strong dislike of Hitler's policies and a respect for what he perceived to be Hitler's military acumen, before becoming more disassociated with the party after The Night of the Long Knives and Kristallnacht which he saw as proof Hitler had no intentions to pursue justice. As a practising Catholic, it was noted that the growing systematic ill-treatment of Jews and suppression of religion had offended Stauffenberg's strong sense of Catholic morality and justice.

Even though Stauffenberg joined the covert resistance movement within the Wehrmacht, like many members of the Nazi Party, he displayed a tentative opposition to parliamentary democracy.

== World War II (1939–1944) ==
=== Activities in 1939–1940 ===
Following the outbreak of war in 1939, Stauffenberg and his regiment took part in the Invasion of Poland. During this time, he was a strong supporter of Poland's occupation, and the Nazi Party's colonisation, exploitation and use of Pole slave workers to bring about German prosperity. Stauffenberg himself noted, "It is essential that we begin a systemic colonisation in Poland. But I have no fear that this will not occur". After the Invasion, Stauffenberg's unit was reorganised into the 6th Panzer Division, and he served as an officer on its General Staff in the Battle of France, for which he was awarded the Iron Cross First Class.

While his uncle, Nikolaus Graf von Üxküll-Gyllenband, together with Fritz-Dietlof von der Schulenburg, had approached Stauffenberg to join the resistance movement against the Hitler regime, it was only after the Polish campaign that Stauffenberg began to consider the offer. Peter Yorck von Wartenburg and Ulrich Schwerin von Schwanenfeld had urged him to become the adjutant of Walther von Brauchitsch, then Supreme Commander of the Army, to facilitate a coup against Hitler. Though, Stauffenberg declined at the time, reasoning that all German soldiers had pledged allegiance not to the institution of the presidency of the German Reich, but to the person of Adolf Hitler, due to the Führereid introduced in 1934.

=== Operation Barbarossa, 1941–1942 ===
During the quieter months of 1940 to 1941, Stauffenberg was transferred to the organisational department of the Oberkommando des Heeres ("Army High Command"; OKH), which was directing the German invasion of the Soviet Union and operations on the Eastern Front. Though Stauffenberg did not engage in any coup plotting at this time, his brothers Berthold and Alexander maintained contact with anti-regime figures such as the Kreisau Circle and former commanders such as Hoepner.

Hoffman, in citing Brigadier Oskar Alfred-Berger's letters, noted Stauffenberg had commented openly on the ill-treatment of the Jews when he "expressed outrage and shock on this subject to fellow officers in the General Staff Headquarters in Vinnitsa, Ukraine during the summer of 1942." When Stauffenberg's friend, Major Joachim Kuhn, was captured by the Red Army, during interrogation on 2 September 1944, Kuhn claimed that Stauffenberg had told him in August 1942 that "They are shooting Jews in masses. These crimes must not be allowed to continue."

=== Tunisia, 1943 ===
In November 1942, the Allies landed in French North Africa whilst the 10th Panzer Division occupied Vichy France (Case Anton), consequently being transferred to fight in the Tunisian campaign, as part of the Afrika Korps. In 1943, Stauffenberg was promoted to Oberstleutnant i.G. (lieutenant-colonel of the general staff), and was sent to Africa to join the 10th Panzer Division as its Operations Officer in the General Staff (Ia). On 19 February, Rommel launched his counter-offensive against British, American and French forces in Tunisia. The Axis commanders hoped to rapidly break through either the Sbiba or Kasserine Pass into the rear of the British First Army. The assault at Sbiba was halted, so Rommel concentrated on the Kasserine Pass where primarily the Italian 7th Bersaglieri Regiment and 131st Armoured Division Centauro had defeated the American defenders. During the fighting, Stauffenberg drove up to be with the leading tanks and troops of the 10th Panzer Division. The division, together with the 21st Panzer Division, took up defensive positions near Mezzouna on 8 April.

On 7 April 1943, Stauffenberg was involved in driving from one unit to another, directing their movement. Near Mezzouna, his vehicle was part of a column strafed by P-40 Kittyhawk fighter bombers of the Desert Air Force – most likely from No. 3 Squadron RAAF – and he received multiple severe wounds. Stauffenberg spent three months in a hospital in Munich, where he was treated by Ferdinand Sauerbruch. Stauffenberg lost his left eye, his right hand, and two fingers on his left hand. He jokingly remarked to friends never to have really known what to do with so many fingers when he still had all of them. For his injuries, Stauffenberg was awarded the Wound Badge in Gold on 14 April and for his courage the German Cross in Gold on 8 May.

=== In the resistance, 1943–1944 ===
For rehabilitation, Stauffenberg was sent to his home, Schloss Lautlingen (today a museum), then still one of the Stauffenberg castles in southern Germany. The Torfels near Meßstetten Bueloch had been visited many times. Initially, he felt frustrated not to be in a position to stage a coup himself. But by the beginning of September 1943, after a somewhat slow recovery from his wounds, he was propositioned by the conspirators and was introduced to Henning von Tresckow as a staff officer to the headquarters of the Ersatzheer ("Replacement Army" – charged with training soldiers to reinforce first line divisions at the front), located on the Bendlerstrasse (later Stauffenbergstrasse) in Berlin.

There, one of Stauffenberg's superiors was General Friedrich Olbricht, a committed member of the resistance movement. The Ersatzheer had a unique opportunity to launch a coup, as one of its functions was to have Operation Valkyrie in place. This was a contingency measure to let it assume control of the Reich in the event that internal disturbances blocked communications to the military high command. The Valkyrie plan had been agreed to by Hitler but was secretly changed to sweep the rest of his regime from power in the event of his death. In 1943, Henning von Tresckow was deployed on the Eastern Front, giving Stauffenberg control of the resistance. (Tresckow never returned to Germany, as he committed suicide at Królowy Most, Poland, in 1944, after learning of the plot's failure.)

A detailed military plan was developed not only to occupy Berlin, but also to take the different headquarters of the German army and of Hitler in East Prussia by military force after the suicide assassination attempt by Axel von dem Bussche in late November 1943. Stauffenberg had von dem Bussche transmit these written orders personally to Major Kuhn once he had arrived at Wolfsschanze (Wolf's Lair) near Rastenburg, East Prussia. However, von dem Bussche had left the Wolfsschanze for the eastern front, after the meeting with Hitler was cancelled, and the attempt could not be made.

Kuhn became a prisoner of war of the Soviets after the 20 July plot. He led the Soviets to the hiding place of the documents in February 1945. In 1989, Soviet leader Mikhail Gorbachev presented these documents to German chancellor Dr. Helmut Kohl. The conspirators' motivations have been a matter of discussion for years in Germany since the war. Many thought the plotters wanted to kill Hitler in order to end the war and to avoid the loss of their privileges as professional officers and members of the nobility.

On D-Day, 6 June 1944, the Allies had landed in France. Stauffenberg, like most other German professional military officers, felt certain the war was lost. Only an immediate armistice could avoid more unnecessary bloodshed and further damage to Germany, its people, and other European nations. However, in late 1943, he had written out demands with which he felt the Allies had to comply in order for Germany to agree to an immediate peace. These demands included Germany retaining its 1914 eastern borders, including the Polish territories of Wielkopolska and Poznań.

Other demands included keeping such territorial gains as Austria and the Sudetenland within the Reich, giving autonomy to Alsace-Lorraine and even expansion of the current wartime borders of Germany in the south by annexing Tyrol as far as Bozen and Meran. Non-territorial demands included such points as refusal of any occupation of Germany by the Allies, as well as refusal to hand over war criminals by demanding the right of "nations to deal with its own criminals." These proposals were directed to only the Western Allies – Stauffenberg wanted Germany to retreat from only the western, southern, and northern positions, while demanding the right to continue military occupation of German territorial gains in the east.

=== 20 July plot ===
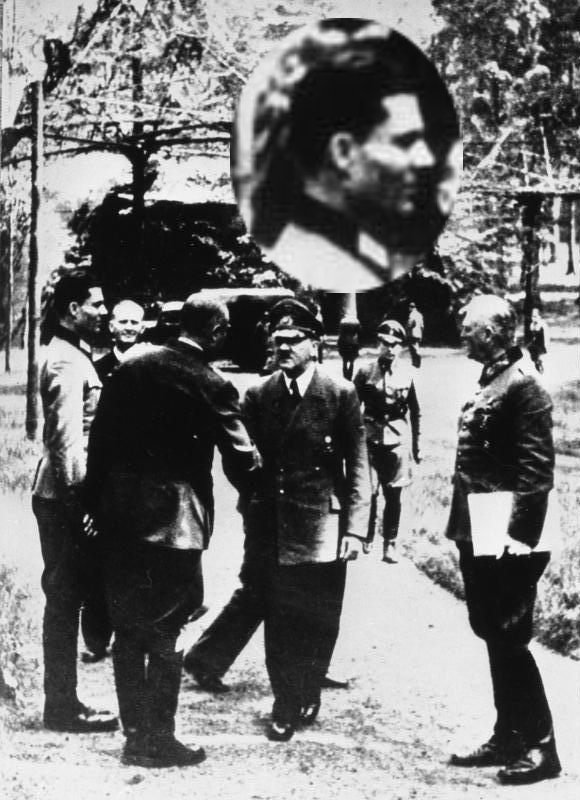
Graf von Stauffenberg, left, with Hitler (centre) and Generalfeldmarschall Wilhelm Keitel, right, in an aborted assassination attempt at Rastenburg on 15 July 1944

As early as September 1942, Stauffenberg was considering Hans Georg Schmidt von Altenstadt, author of Unser Weg zum Meer, as a replacement for Hitler. From the beginning of September 1943 until 20 July 1944, Stauffenberg was the driving force behind the plot to assassinate Hitler and take control of Germany. His resolve, organizational abilities, and radical approach put an end to inactivity caused by doubts and long discussions on whether military virtues had been made obsolete by Hitler's behaviour. With the help of his friend Henning von Tresckow, he united the conspirators and drove them into action.

Graf von Stauffenberg was aware that, under German law, he was committing high treason. He openly told young conspirator Axel von dem Bussche in late 1943, "Ich betreibe mit allen mir zur Verfügung stehenden Mitteln den Hochverrat..." ("I am committing high treason with all means at my disposal..."). He justified himself to Bussche by referring to the right under natural law (Naturrecht) to defend millions of people's lives from the criminal aggressions of Hitler.

Only after the conspirator General Hellmuth Stieff on 7 July 1944 had declared himself unable to assassinate Hitler on a uniforms display at Klessheim castle near Salzburg, did Stauffenberg decide to personally kill Hitler and to run the plot in Berlin. By then, Stauffenberg had great doubts about the possibility of success. Tresckow convinced him to go on with it even if it had no chance of success at all, "The assassination must be attempted. Even if it fails, we must take action in Berlin", as this was the only way to prove to the world that the Hitler regime and Germany were not one and the same and that not all Germans supported the regime.

Stauffenberg's part in the original plan required him to stay at the Bendlerstraße offices in Berlin, so he could phone regular army units all over Europe in an attempt to convince them to arrest leaders of Nazi political organisations such as the Sicherheitsdienst (SD) and the Gestapo. When General Hellmuth Stieff, Chief of Operation at Army High Command, who had regular access to Hitler, backtracked from his earlier commitment to assassinate Hitler, Stauffenberg was forced to take on two critical roles: kill Hitler far from Berlin and trigger the military machine in Berlin during office hours of the very same day. Beside Stieff, he was the only conspirator who had regular access to Hitler (during his briefings) by mid-1944, as well as being the only officer among the conspirators thought to have the resolve and persuasiveness to convince German military leaders to throw in with the coup once Hitler was dead. This requirement, alone, greatly increased the chance of a successful coup.

==== Assassination attempt ====
After several unsuccessful attempts by Stauffenberg to encounter Hitler, Göring, and Himmler at the same time, he went ahead with the attempt at the Wolfsschanze on 20 July 1944. Stauffenberg entered the briefing room carrying a briefcase containing two small bombs. The location had unexpectedly been changed from the Führerbunker to Albert Speer's wooden hut due to the heat on this summer's day. He left the room to arm the first bomb with specially adapted pliers. This was a difficult task for him as he had lost his right hand and had only three fingers on his left hand. A guard knocked and opened the door, urging him to hurry as the meeting was about to begin. As a result, Stauffenberg was able to arm only one of the bombs. He left the second bomb with his aide-de-camp, Werner von Haeften, and returned to the briefing room, where he placed the briefcase under the conference table, as close as he could to Hitler. Some minutes later, he received a planned phone call. He then excused himself and left the room. After his exit, the briefcase was moved by Colonel Heinz Brandt.

When the explosion tore through the hut, Stauffenberg was convinced that no one in the room could have survived. Although four people were killed and almost all survivors were injured, Hitler himself was shielded from the blast by the heavy, solid-oak conference table leg, which Colonel Brandt had placed the briefcase bomb behind, and was only slightly wounded and burned.

Stauffenberg and Haeften quickly left and drove to the nearby airfield. After his return to Berlin, Stauffenberg immediately began to motivate his friends to initiate the second phase: the military coup against the Nazi leaders. Joseph Goebbels announced by radio that Hitler had survived and later, after Hitler spoke on the state radio, the conspirators realised that the coup had failed. They were tracked to their Bendlerstrasse offices and overpowered after a brief shoot-out, during which Stauffenberg was wounded in the shoulder.

== Death ==
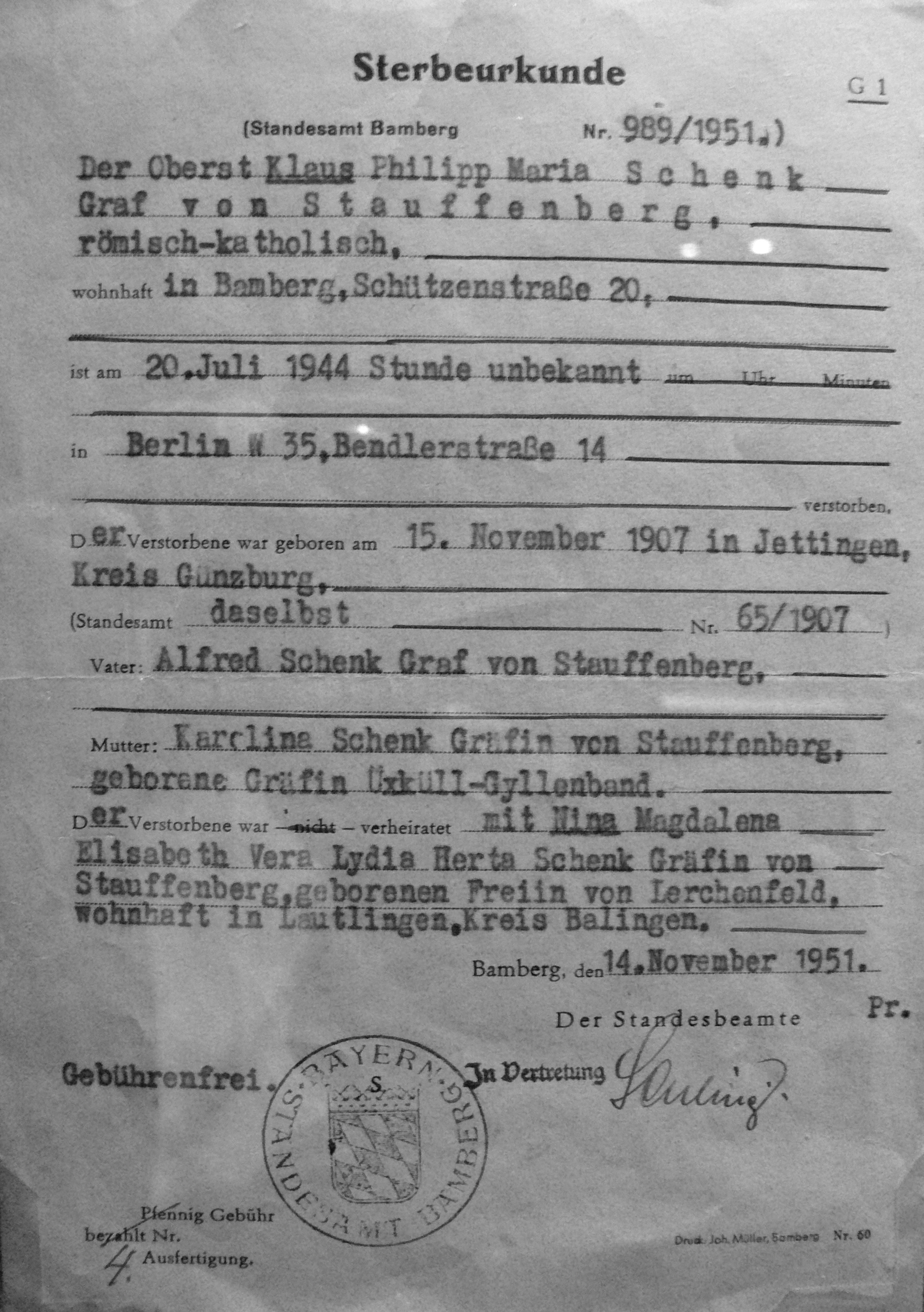
1951 death certificate

In an ultimately failed attempt to save his own life, co-conspirator General Friedrich Fromm, Commander-in-Chief of the Replacement Army present in the Bendlerblock (Headquarters of the Army), charged other conspirators in an impromptu court martial and condemned the ringleaders of the conspiracy to death. Stauffenberg, his aide 1st Lieutenant Werner von Haeften, General Friedrich Olbricht and Colonel Albrecht Mertz von Quirnheim were executed before 1:00 in the morning (21 July 1944) by a makeshift firing squad in the courtyard of the Bendlerblock, which was lit by the headlights of a truck.

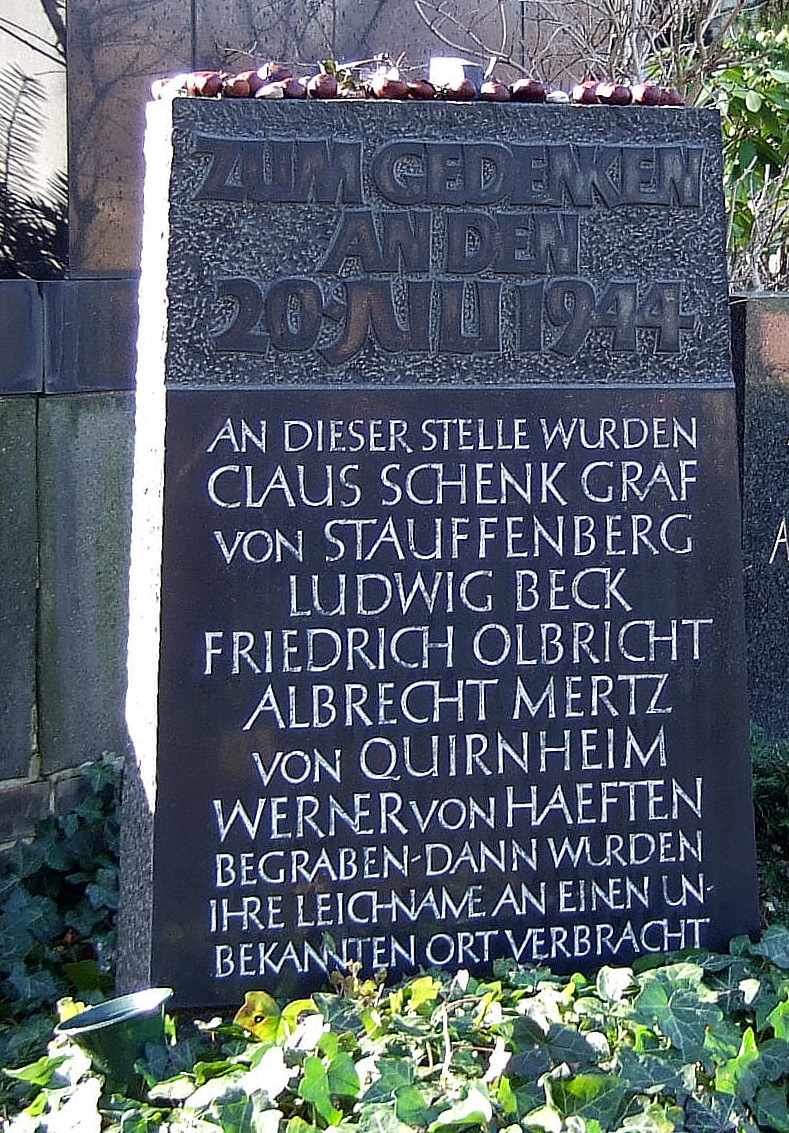
Remembrance stone in Alter St.-Matthäus-Kirchhof cemetery. "Here the corpses were buried and then moved to an unknown place".

Stauffenberg was third in line to be executed, with Lieutenant von Haeften after. However, when it was Stauffenberg's turn, Lieutenant von Haeften placed himself between the firing squad and Stauffenberg, and received the bullets meant for Stauffenberg. When his turn came, Stauffenberg spoke his last words, "Es lebe das heilige Deutschland!" ("Long live sacred Germany!"), or, possibly, "Es lebe das geheime Deutschland!" ("Long live secret Germany!"), in reference to Stefan George and the anti-Nazi circle.

Fromm ordered that the executed officers (his former co-conspirators) receive an immediate burial with military honours in the Alter St.-Matthäus-Kirchhof in Berlin's Schöneberg district. The next day, however, Stauffenberg's body was exhumed by the SS, stripped of his medals and insignia, and cremated.

Another central figure in the plot was Stauffenberg's eldest brother, Berthold Schenk Graf von Stauffenberg. On 10 August 1944, Berthold was tried before Judge-President Roland Freisler in the special "People's Court" (Volksgerichtshof). This court was established by Hitler for political offences. Berthold was one of eight conspirators executed by slow strangulation at Plötzensee Prison, Berlin, later that day. Before he was killed, Berthold was throttled and then revived multiple times. The entire execution and multiple resuscitations were filmed for Hitler to view at his leisure.

More than 200 were condemned in show trials and executed. Hitler used the 20 July plot as an excuse to eliminate anyone he feared would oppose him. The traditional military salute was replaced with the Nazi salute. Eventually, over 20,000 Germans were killed or sent to concentration camps in the purge.

== Legacy ==
=== Assessment ===
One of the few surviving members of the German resistance, Hans Bernd Gisevius, portrayed Colonel Stauffenberg, whom he had met in July 1944, as a man driven by reasons which had little to do with Christian ideals or repugnance of Nazi ideology. In his autobiographical Bis zum bitteren Ende ("To the Bitter End"), Gisevius wrote:

Stauffenberg wanted to retain all the totalitarian, militaristic and socialistic elements of National Socialism (p. 504). What he had in mind was the salvation of Germany by military men who could break with corruption and maladministration, provide an orderly military government and inspire the people to make one last great effort. Reduced to a formula, he wanted the nation to remain soldierly and become socialistic (p. 503).

Stauffenberg was motivated by the impulsive passions of the disillusioned military man whose eyes had been opened by the defeat of German arms (p. 510). Stauffenberg had shifted to the rebel side only after Stalingrad (p. 512).

The difference between Stauffenberg, Helldorf and Schulenburg – all of them counts – was that Helldorf had come to the Nazi Movement as a primitive, I might almost say an unpolitical revolutionary. The other two had been attracted primarily by a political ideology. Therefore, it was possible for Helldorf to throw everything overboard at once: Hitler, the Party, the entire system. Stauffenberg, Schulenberg and their clique wanted to drop no more ballast than was absolutely necessary; then they would paint the ship of state a military gray and set it afloat again (p. 513–514).

Historian Peter Hoffman questions Gisevius's evaluations based on the latter's brief acquaintance with Stauffenberg, misreporting of Stauffenberg's actions, and apparent rivalry with him:

Gisevius met Stauffenberg for the first time in Berlin on July 12, 1944, eight days before the colonel's last assassination attempt against Hitler. ... In view of Gisevius's own record as a transmitter of historical information for which he had displayed strong personal feelings, and in light of what is known about both Gisevius's alleged sources and Stauffenberg himself, Gisevius's account is at best questionable hearsay. Gisevius disliked Stauffenberg. He sensed that this dynamic leader would be an obstacle to his own far-reaching ambitions and intrigues. In his book he mocked Stauffenberg as a presumptuous and ignorant amateur. ... Stauffenberg must have been informed of Gisevius's background and it cannot have inspired his confidence. Gisevius was understandably upset by Stauffenberg's attitude toward him. ... Stauffenberg seemed to regard him merely as an incidental source of background information.

British historian Richard J. Evans, in his books on the Third Reich, covered various aspects of Stauffenberg's beliefs and philosophy. He wrote an article originally published in Süddeutsche Zeitung, 23 January 2009, entitled "Why did Stauffenberg plant the bomb?" which states, "Was it because Hitler was losing the war? Was it to put an end to the mass murder of the Jews? Or was it to save Germany's honour? The overwhelming support, toleration, or silent acquiescence" from the people of his country for Hitler, which was also being heavily censored and constantly fed propaganda, meant any action must be swift and successful. Evans writes, "Had Stauffenberg's bomb succeeded in killing Hitler, it is unlikely that the military coup planned to follow it would have moved the leading conspirators smoothly into power".

However, Karl Heinz Bohrer, a cultural critic, literary scholar, and publisher, criticized Evans' views in an article originally published in the Süddeutsche Zeitung, 30 January 2010. Although agreeing that Evans is historically correct in much of his writing, Bohrer feels that Evans twists time lines and misrepresents certain aspects. He wrote of Evans, "In the course of his problematic argument he walks into two traps: 1. by contesting Stauffenberg's "moral motivation"; 2. by contesting Stauffenberg's suitability as role model." He further writes, "If then, as Evans notes with initial objectivity, Stauffenberg had a strong moral imperative – whether this stemmed from an aristocratic code of honour, Catholic doctrine or Romantic poetry – then this also underpinned his initial affinity for National Socialism which Stauffenberg misinterpreted as 'spiritual renewal'".

=== Commemoration ===
In 1980, the West German government established a memorial for the failed anti-Nazi resistance movement in a part of the Bendlerblock, the remainder of which currently houses the Berlin offices of the German Ministry of Defense (whose main offices remain in Bonn). The Bendlerstrasse was renamed the Stauffenbergstrasse, and the Bendlerblock now houses the Memorial to the German Resistance, a permanent exhibition with more than 5,000 photographs and documents showing the various resistance organisations at work during the Hitler era. The courtyard where the officers were shot on 21 July 1944 is now a memorial site, with a plaque commemorating the events and a bronze figure of a young man with his hands symbolically bound which resembles Graf von Stauffenberg.

After the war, a United States intelligence officer, Ernie Blake, who was involved in interrogation of Nazi officers, went on to establish a ski area in Taos, New Mexico. He named a ski run on the West Basin Ridge "Stauffenberg", after Stauffenberg (as well as three other runs after the names of other German officers who took part in the assassination attempt: Oster, von Tresckow, and Fabian).

== Personal life ==
=== Family ===
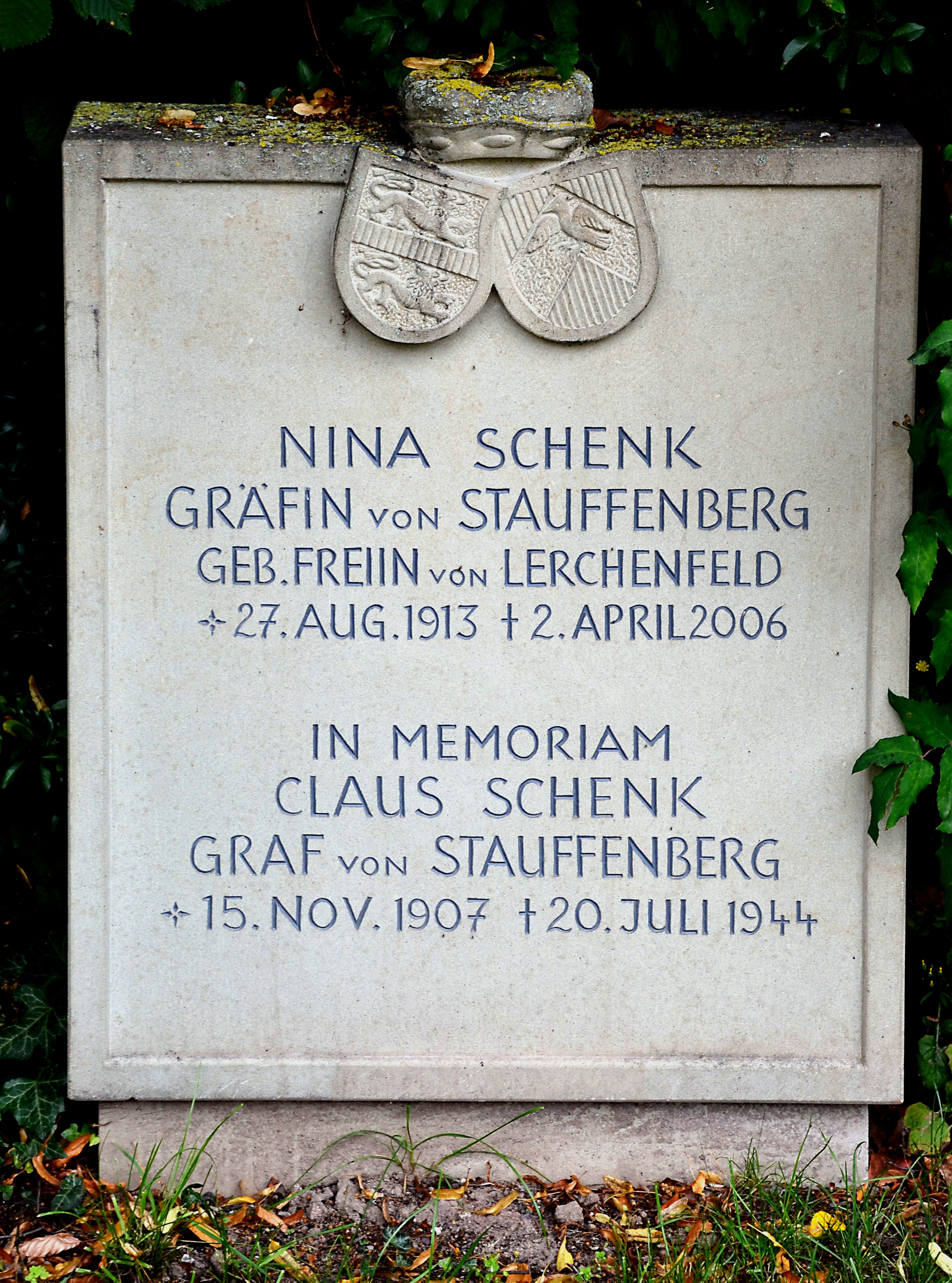
The grave of Nina Schenk Gräfin von Stauffenberg and the memorial to her husband, Oberst Claus Schenk Graf von Stauffenberg, at Kirchlauter

Stauffenberg married Elisabeth Magdalena 'Nina' Freiin von Lerchenfeld on 26 September 1933 in Bamberg. Born into the House of Lerchenfeld, part of the old Bavarian nobility, she was a third cousin of Prince Philip, Duke of Edinburgh, consort of Queen Elizabeth II. They had five children: Berthold, Heimeran, Franz-Ludwig, Valerie, and Konstanze, who was born in Frankfurt on the Oder seven months after Stauffenberg's execution. Stauffenberg lived with his family in Berlin-Wannsee. Berthold, Heimeran, Franz-Ludwig, Valerie and Kostanze, who were not told of their father's deed, were placed in a foster home for the remainder of the war and were forced to use new surnames, as Stauffenberg was considered taboo.

Nina died at the age of 92 on 2 April 2006 at Kirchlauter near Bamberg and was buried there on 8 April. Berthold Schenk Graf von Stauffenberg went on to become a Generalmajor in West Germany's post-war Bundeswehr. Franz-Ludwig became a member of both the German and European parliaments, representing the Christian Social Union in Bavaria. In 2008, her youngest daughter, Konstanze Alexandra Ruth Maria von Schulthess-Rechberg (b. 1945), wrote a best-selling book about her mother, Nina Schenk Gräfin von Stauffenberg.

He let things come to him, and then he made up his mind ... one of his characteristics was that he really enjoyed playing the devil's advocate. Conservatives were convinced that he was a ferocious Nazi, and ferocious Nazis were convinced he was an unreconstructed conservative. He was neither.

== In popular culture ==
Dramas with portrayals of Stauffenberg include: The Desert Fox: The Story of Rommel (1951; Eduard Franz); The Night of the Generals (1967; Gérard Buhr); the Russian film series Liberation (Освобождение), released in 1970 and 1971, directed by Yuri Ozerov and with East German actors, with Alfred Struwe played Stauffenberg, the third film, Part 2 (Direction of the Main Blow), depicts the plot; War and Remembrance (1988, Sky du Mont); The Plot to Kill Hitler (1990, Brad Davis); Stauffenberg (2004, Sebastian Koch); and Valkyrie (2008, Tom Cruise).

== See also ==
- Assassination attempts on Adolf Hitler
- Melitta Schenk Gräfin von Stauffenberg

== Bibliography ==
- Baigent, M.; Leigh, R. (1994). Secret Germany: Claus von Stauffenberg and the Mystical Crusade Against Hitler. London: Jonathan Cape. ISBN 9780224035255.
- Burleigh, M. (2012). The Third Reich: A New History. London: Pan Macmillan. ISBN 9780330475501.
- Fest, J. (1997). Plotting Hitler's Death: The Story of German Resistance. New York: Henry Holt and Company. ISBN 9780805056488.
- Gill, Anton (1994). An Honourable Defeat: A History of German Resistance to Hitler, 1933-1945. Henry Holt & Co. ISBN 978-0805035148.
- Hoffmann, P. (2013) [1992]. "The Second World War, German Society, and Internal Resistance to Hitler". In Large, D.C. (ed.). Contending with Hitler. Contending with Hitler: Varieties of German Resistance in the Third Reich. Cambridge University Press. pp. 119–128. doi:10.1017/CBO9781139052597.009. ISBN 9781139052597.
- Hoffmann, P. (1998). Stauffenberg und der 20. Juli 1944 (in German). Munich: C.H. Beck. ISBN 9783406433023.
- Hoffmann, P. (2003). Stauffenberg: A Family History, 1905–1944. Montreal: McGill-Queen's Press. ISBN 9780773525955.
- Jones, N.H. (2008). Countdown to Valkyrie: The July Plot to Assassinate Hitler. Philadelphia: Casemate. ISBN 9781848325081.
- Mitcham, S.W. (2006). The Panzer Legions: A Guide to the German Army Tank Divisions of World War II. Mechanicsburg: Stackpole. ISBN 9780811733533.
- Moorhouse, R. (2006). Killing Hitler: The Third Reich and the Plots Against the Führer. London: Jonathan Cape. ISBN 9780224071215.
- Müller, C. (2003) [1970]. Stauffenberg: eine Biographie (in German). Düsseldorf: Droste. ISBN 9783770040643.
- Noll, G. (24 April 2025). "Killing Hitler Word by Word: The Oath as Apocalyptic Lawmaking". Jus Cogens. A Critical Journal of Philosophy of Law and Politics. 7. doi:10.1007/s42439-025-00106-w – via Springer Nature.
- Tyson, Joseph Howard (September 2010). The Surreal Reich. iUniverse. ISBN 978-1450240192.
- Venohr, Wolfgang (2019). Stauffenberg. Symbol of Resistance: The Man Who Almost Killed Hitler. Frontline Books. ISBN 978-1473856837.
- Wheeler-Bennett, J.; Overly, R. (2005). The Nemesis of Power: The German Army in Politics 1918–1945. London: Palgrave Macmillan. ISBN 9781403918123.
