= Susan Bluestein =

American casting director

- Born: May 27, 1946 (age 80); New York, New York, U.S.
- Occupation: American casting director
- Years active: 1980–1997
- Spouse: Brad Davis (m. 1976; died 1991)
- Children: 1

Susan Bluestein (born May 27, 1946) is an American casting director and the widow of actor Brad Davis.

== Biography ==
Born in Manhattan and raised in Queens, New York, Bluestein has spent much of her career casting television movies, including The People vs. Jean Harris, A Piano for Mrs. Cimino, Casualties of Love: The "Long Island Lolita" Story, and Oldest Living Confederate Widow Tells All. She cast multiple episodes of the series Punky Brewster, Providence and JAG and has cast every episode of NCIS and NCIS: Los Angeles since their premieres.

Bluestein's casting credits for feature films include Crimes of the Heart, Who's Harry Crumb?, and Homeward Bound: The Incredible Journey. Her other projects include the 2008 BBC/HBO docudrama House of Saddam and Dehli-6.

== Awards ==
In 1995, Bluestein won the Emmy Award for Outstanding Casting for her work on NYPD Blue.

In 2014, NCIS star Pauley Perrette presented Bluestein and her casting partner, Jason Kennedy, the Media Access Casting Society of America Award for their work promoting awareness of the disability experience, accessibility for people with disabilities, and the accurate depiction of characters with disabilities.

== Family ==
Bluestein and Davis were married in 1976 and had one child, actor Alex Blue Davis, who is a transgender man. In 1985, Davis was diagnosed HIV-positive, a condition he and Bluestein kept secret until just before his death in 1991, by assisted suicide. Bluestein co-authored a biographical memoir in 1997.

== Casting filmography ==
Project Title	Project Type	Year	Other details
NCIS: Los Angeles	TV series	2009–2022	
NCIS	TV series	2003–2022	
NCIS: New Orleans	TV series	2014–2017	
The Dresden Files	TV series	2008	original casting
House of Saddam	TV mini-series	2008	U.S. casting
Spellbound	TV pilot	2007	
Pu-239	Film	2007	U.S. casting
A Little Thing Called Murder	TV movie	2006	Artios Award nomination for Outstanding Achievement in Casting for a Television Movie
Mermaid	TV pilot	2005	
JAG	TV series	2003–2005	
Vegas Dick	TV pilot	2003	
Providence	TV series	1999–2002	
The Learning Curve	Film	2001	
Murder on the Orient Express	TV movie	2001	
Voyage of the Unicorn	TV movie	2001	
Chestnut Hill	TV pilot	2001	
A Vision of Murder: The Story of Donielle	TV movie	2000	
Aftershock: Earthquake in New York	TV mini-series	1999	
Creature	TV movie	1998	
The Price of Heaven	TV movie	1997	
A Face to Die For	TV movie	1996	
Sweet Temptation	Film	1996	
Riders of the Purple Sage	TV movie	1996	
Ink	TV series	1996–1997	
Kidnapped: In the Line of Duty	TV movie	1995	
Children of the Dust	TV mini-series	1995	
The Haunting of Seacliff Inn	TV movie	1994	
Shadows of Desire	TV movie	1994	
Menendez: A Killing in Beverly Hills	TV movie	1994	Artios Award nomination for Outstanding Achievement in Casting for a Television Movie
Oldest Living Confederate Widow Tells All	TV movie	1994	Artios Award nomination for Outstanding Achievement in Casting for a Television Movie
NYPD Blue	TV series	1995	Emmy Award win & Artios Award nomination for Outstanding Achievement in Casting for a Drama Series
Homeward Bound: The Incredible Journey	Film	1993	
The Last Hit	TV movie	1993	
Casualties of Love: The Long Island Lolita Story	TV movie	1993	
Alex Haley's Queen	TV mini-series	1993	Artios Award nomination for Outstanding Achievement in Casting for a Mini-Series
Double Edge	TV movie	1992	
Heart of Darkness	Film	1993	Los Angeles casting
Angel Falls	TV series	1993	
We're Talking Serious Money	Film	1992	
Saturday's	TV pilot	1991	
Dillinger	TV movie	1991	
When You Remember Me	TV movie	1990	
Tripwire	Film	1990	
Rock Hudson	TV movie	1990	
The Final Days	TV movie	1989	Artios Award nomination for Outstanding Achievement in Casting for a Television Movie
Who's Harry Crumb?	Film	1989	
The Edge	TV mini-series	1989	
Dream Breakers	TV movie	1989	
Red Earth, White Earth	TV movie	1989	
Dance 'Til Dawn	TV movie	1988	
Something Is Out There	TV mini-series	1988	
My Two Dads	TV series	1987–1990	
Daddy	TV movie	1987	
A Different World	TV series	1983	original casting
Thompson's Last Run	TV movie	1986	
Crimes of the Heart	Film	1986	
Our Family Honor	TV series	1985–1986	
Anatomy of an Illness	TV movie	1984	
Punky Brewster	TV series	1984–1988	
Choices of the Heart	TV movie	1983	
Casablanca	TV series	1983	
Private School	Film	1983	
Another Woman's Child	TV movie	1983	
Coming Out of the Ice	TV movie	1982	
A Piano for Mrs. Cimino	TV movie	1982	
The Nashville Grab	TV movie	1981	
The People vs. Jean Harris	TV movie	1981	
The Killing of Randy Webster	TV movie	1981	
Mark, I Love You	TV movie	1980	
A Christmas Without Snow	TV movie	1980	
