= Heart (1987 film) =

1987 film directed by James Lemmo

- Theatrical release poster
- Directed by: James Lemmo
- Written by: James Lemmo; Randy Jurgensen
- Produced by: Randy Jurgensen
- Starring: Brad Davis; Jesse Doran; Steve Buscemi; Frank Adu; Sam Gray; Billy Costello; Frances Fisher
- Cinematography: Jacek Laskus
- Edited by: Larry Marinelli
- Music by: Geoff Levin; Chris Many
- Production company: Trans Atlantic Entertainment
- Distributed by: New World Pictures
- Release date: November 1987
- Running time: 90 minutes
- Country: United States
- Language: English

Heart is a 1987 American sports drama film directed by James Lemmo (in his directorial debut), from a screenplay by Lemmo and Randy Jurgensen, who also produced the film. It stars Brad Davis, Jesse Doran, Steve Buscemi, Frank Adu, Sam Gray, Billy Costello, and Frances Fisher.

== Plot ==
A punch-drunk boxer is set up as an easy win for an up-and-coming young boxer in this melodrama. The highlight of the film is the performance of Steve Buscemi as the oily, mob-connected fight promoter Nicky. Eddie (Brad Davis) is the addle-brained boxer Nicky hangs out to dry for quick money.

== Cast ==
- Brad Davis as Eddie
- Frances Fisher as Jeannie
- Steve Buscemi as Nicky
- Frank Adu as Buddy
- Jesse Doran as Diddy
- Sam Gray as Leo
- Billy Costello as Manuella
- Saoul Mamby as First Opponent
- Daniel O'Shea as Joey
- Joseph Dolphin as Ames
- F.L. Schmidlapp as Freddie
- Robert Mathias as Tino
- Lance Davis as Jerry
- Peter Carew as Matty
- Anthony Bishop as Mr. Arturo
- Lisa Ellex as Rosa
- Tony Lip as Max
- Lynn Weaver as Peach

== See also ==
- List of boxing films
