= From Noon till Three =

1976 film by Frank D. Gilroy

- Theatrical release poster
- Directed by: Frank D. Gilroy
- Written by: Frank D. Gilroy
- Based on: novel by Frank D. Gilroy
- Produced by: M.J. Frankovich; William Self
- Starring: Charles Bronson; Jill Ireland
- Cinematography: Lucien Ballard
- Edited by: Maury Winetrobe
- Music by: Elmer Bernstein
- Distributed by: United Artists
- Release date: 1976
- Running time: 99 minutes
- Country: United States
- Language: English

From Noon till Three is a 1976 American Western film released by United Artists. It stars Charles Bronson and his wife, Jill Ireland. It was written and directed by Frank D. Gilroy, based on his novel.

== Plot ==
In the late 19th century American West, a gang of bank robbers, including Graham Dorsey (Charles Bronson), is off to rob a small-town bank, but Graham is having second thoughts: he's had a nightmare in which the gang was wiped out during the robbery attempt. Worse, Graham's horse broke a leg and the gang members have to get another. They try to steal a horse at the ranch of the widow Amanda Starbuck (Jill Ireland). Amanda, suspicious of the men, denies having a horse. Graham checks out the barn and finds a horse, but still afraid of disaster, he lies to his men and agrees to wait three hours at the ranch for their return. It turns out he has another reason for wanting to stay behind though: he wants to force himself on Mrs. Starbuck. Amanda resists rather inventively; simply lies still, fully clothed. This frustrates Graham, who decides on a ruse. He pretends he is impotent, hoping to play on Amanda's sympathy. The deception works, and they have sex three times.

As time passes, Graham and Amanda have a long, thoughtful discussion talking of their past lives, as well as their hopes and ambitions - Graham even wants to go straight and work in a bank. They even dance to Amanda's music box, with Graham wearing Mr. Starbuck's old tuxedo. A neighbor boy stops by to tell Amanda about an attempted bank robbery. The bank robbers from Graham's gang were caught and were going to be hanged in town that afternoon. She thinks Graham should ride out and help them. Graham thinks this is a way for him to be able to stay with her and get away from the gang. After much coercing he decides to play along and rides out, intending only to have a long nap. But this is shattered when the posse rides into sight, spotting Graham and giving chase. Graham eludes them when he comes upon a traveling dentist, exchanges clothes with him at gunpoint, and steals his horse and wagon. The unfortunate Dr. Finger is taken for Graham and shot dead. The posse, recognizing Mr. Starbuck's horse and tux, bring the body back to the Starbuck ranch. Amanda, seeing what she thinks is Graham's body faints. But Graham does not get away clean: it turns out Dr. Finger was a quack, and the first person Graham encounters after his escape was one of Dr. Finger's dissatisfied customers. He is put into prison on a year-long sentence for Dr. Finger's crimes.

At first Amanda is ostracized by the townspeople. But an impassioned speech proclaiming her true love for Graham does a remarkable trick: the townspeople not only forgive her, they see a remarkable story in that of Graham and Amanda. This story forms the basis of a legend, one that spawns a popular book, From Noon Till Three, dime novels, a stage play, and even a popular song, "Hello and Goodbye," set to the tune of Amanda's music box. The legend of Graham and Amanda becomes bigger than the reality of the two, and with her book a worldwide best seller it makes Amanda a wealthy woman. Graham, who reads the book while in prison, is amused by the distortions: Graham is described as being 6'3" (1.90 m), Southern, and very handsome; he is, in fact, none of these. After serving his time he is eager to renew his relationship with Amanda.

A disguised Graham takes one of Amanda's guided tours of her ranch, and stays behind, intending to reveal himself. When he does so, Amanda does not recognize him and becomes frightened. When he mentions details of their time together, she keeps noting, "It's in the book." It is only when Graham shows her "something that's not in the book" that Amanda believes him. But instead of joy, Amanda is confused and worried. If word got out that Graham was alive, the legend of Graham and Amanda would be done for. Even Graham's suggestion that he live with her incognito is no good; after all, if Amanda were to live with another man, the legend would still be destroyed. The encounter ends up with Amanda pointing a gun at Graham ... but at the last second she decides to shoot herself.

Graham is heartbroken. Not only has he lost Amanda, the secret of his real identity is lost for good. He tries to forget what has happened, but there are reminders everywhere. He hears "their song" at a local saloon, and walks in on a stage production of From Noon Till Three. Worse, people he knew slightly laugh when he says he is Graham, since he looks nothing like his description in the book. Ultimately he is arrested and put in an insane asylum, where he meets the only people who believe him: his fellow inmates. He seems relieved.

== Cast ==
- Charles Bronson as Graham Dorsey
- Jill Ireland as Amanda Starbuck
- Douglas Fowley as Buck Bowers
- Stan Haze as Ape
- Damon Douglas as Boy
- Bert Williams as Sheriff
- William Lanteau as Rev. Cabot
- Betty Cole as Edna
- Davis Roberts as Sam
- Don "Red" Barry as Red Roxy
- Anne Ramsey as Massive Woman

== Reception ==
The film marked a move from usual Bronson's films, being more centered on comedy and romance than on action. Jerry Vermilye noted: "The film’s critical consensus was nearly unanimous in blaming Gilroy for its inconsistency of tone and style, and for allowing an initially intriguing premise to go wildly astray, ending on a decidedly downbeat note."

=== Accolades ===
The film was nominated for a Golden Globe for Best Original Song.
