= Cold Steel (1987 film) =

1987 film by Dorothy Ann Puzo

- Theatrical release poster
- Directed by: Dorothy Ann Puzo
- Written by: Lisa M. Hansen; Dorothy Ann Puzo; Moe Quigley; Michael Sonye
- Produced by: Lisa M. Hansen
- Starring: Brad Davis; Sharon Stone; Jonathan Banks; Jay Acavone; Adam Ant
- Cinematography: Thomas F. Denove
- Edited by: David Bartlett
- Music by: David A. Jackson
- Distributed by: CineTel Films
- Release date: December 11, 1987
- Running time: 91 minutes
- Country: United States
- Language: English
- Box office: $285,885

Cold Steel is a 1987 American thriller film directed by Dorothy Ann Puzo, and starring Brad Davis, Sharon Stone, Jonathan Banks, and Adam Ant. It was Anthony LaPaglia's film debut.

== Plot ==
It begins when detective Johnny Modine (Brad Davis) gets his Christmas celebration spoiled with the news about his father's death, which is the work of psychopathic junkies who slashed the old man to death while robbing his store. Johnny is determined to find the person responsible and get his revenge, even if it means the end of his police career.

Johnny doesn't know that the murder was actually part of a sinister revenge plot directed against him. Leader of those murderous thugs is his former friend and colleague Isaac (Jonathan Banks) who blames Johnny for the incident that left him crippled many years ago. But before he gets to Isaac, Johnny must overcome many obstacles, including Kathy (Sharon Stone), an attractive but mysterious woman with a hidden agenda.

== Cast ==
- Brad Davis as Detective Johnny Modine
- Sharon Stone as Kathy Connors
- Jonathan Banks as Isaac "Iceman"
- Jay Acovone as "Cookie"
- Adam Ant as Dorian "Mick" Michael Duran
- Eddie Egan as Lieutenant Hill
- Sy Richardson as Rashid
- Anne Haney as Anna Modine
- Ron Karabatsos as Fishman
- William Lanteau as Sam Modine
- Mindy Seeger as Wanda
- Pat Asanti as Sergeant Yancy
- James Scally as O'Reilly
- Michael Warren as Eddie
- John Wheeler as Mahoney
- Peter DeAnello as Tito
- Jesse Aragon as Gang Leader
- Heidi Kozak as Gang Girl
- Robert Cervi as "Tatoo"
- Anthony LaPaglia as "Spooky"
- Nick Savage as "T-Bone"
- Jack Shea as "Spread'Em"

== Home media ==
After the film's theatrical run, the film was released on videocassette in March 1988 by RCA/Columbia Pictures Home Video. On December 2, 2002, Columbia TriStar Home Video released the film on DVD.
