= William Lanteau =

American actor (1922 – 1993)

- William Lanteau in The Andy Griffith Show 1960
- Born: William Lanctot; November 12, 1922; St. Johnsbury, Vermont, U.S.
- Died: November 3, 1993 (aged 70); Los Angeles, California, U.S.
- Years active: 1954–1991
- Known for: Character actor

William Lanteau (born William Lanctot; November 12, 1922 – November 3, 1993) was an American character actor. Among his best known roles are Charlie the mail carrier in On Golden Pond and mayor Chester Wanamaker in Newhart.

== Life and career ==
Lanteau was born in St. Johnsbury, Vermont. During WWII he was in the Army. His first television appearance was in 1954 in an episode of Goodyear Television Playhouse. He appeared in over 80 television shows, among them The Donna Reed Show, The Ghost & Mrs. Muir, The Andy Griffith Show, Here's Lucy, Wonder Woman, No Soap, Radio, Centennial and Amen. He appeared in the first season of Barnaby Jones in an episode titled "To Denise, with Love and Murder" (April 22, 1973). He also appeared in the movies Li'l Abner (1959), The Honeymoon Machine (1961), Sex and the Single Girl (1964), Hotel (1967), From Noon till Three (1976), On Golden Pond (1981), Cold Steel (1987), and Shadow of a Doubt (1991).Other notable appearances on television included The Twilight Zone , Dr. Kildare, Perry Mason, The Man from U.N.C.L.E., The Waltons, CHiPs, Trapper John, M.D., Diff'rent Strokes, Hart to Hart, Cagney & Lacey, Cheers, Murder, She Wrote, The Wonder Years, Newhart, Amen, and Coach

== Death ==
He died of complications from heart surgery on November 3, 1993, at age 70.

== Filmography ==
Year	Title	Role	Notes
1959	Li'l Abner	Available Jones	
1960	The Facts of Life	Airline Clerk	
1961	The Honeymoon Machine	Tommy Dane	
1962	That Touch of Mink	Leonard	Uncredited
1963	The Twilight Zone	Dolan	Season 4, Episode 18: "The Bard"
1964	Sex and the Single Girl	Sylvester	
1967	Hotel	Mason	
1976	From Noon till Three	Reverend Cabot	
1981	On Golden Pond	Charlie Martin	
1987	Cold Steel	Sam Modine	
