= Philip Caputo =

American author and journalist (1941–2026)

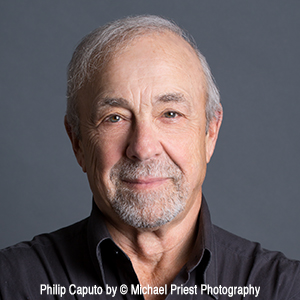
- Caputo in 2016
- Born: Philip Joseph Caputo; June 10, 1941; Chicago, Illinois, U.S.
- Died: May 7, 2026 (aged 84); Norwalk, Connecticut, U.S.
- Education: Loyola University Chicago (BA)
- Occupations: Author; journalist
- Known for: A Rumor of War (1977)
- Spouses: Jill Ongemach; Marcelle Basse; Leslie Ware (m. 1988)
- Children: 2
- Website: philipcaputo.com

Philip Joseph Caputo (June 10, 1941 – May 7, 2026) was an American author and journalist. He was best known for A Rumor of War (1977), a best-selling memoir of his experiences during the Vietnam War. Caputo wrote 19 books, including three memoirs, five books of general nonfiction, nine novels, and two books of short stories. His latest was a collection of short stories Wandering Souls: And Other Stories which was published in 2025 by Arcade Publishing.

== Early life and career ==
Philip Caputo was born in Chicago and raised in suburban Berwyn and Westchester. He attended Fenwick High School and Loyola University Chicago, graduating with a B.A. in English in 1964. From 1965 to 1966 Caputo served in the Republic of Vietnam (RVN) as an infantry lieutenant (platoon commander) in the United States Marine Corps. Caputo served in combat and earned several medals and awards upon completion of his tour of duty.

After serving three years in the Corps, Caputo began a career in journalism, joining the staff of the Chicago Tribune in 1968. In 1973, Caputo was part of a writing team that won the Pulitzer Prize for reporting on election fraud in Chicago. For the next five years, he was a foreign correspondent for the Tribune. He covered the fall of Saigon in 1975, and he worked in Italy, the Soviet Union and the Middle East. In 1975, he was shot and wounded in the ankle by a militiaman with an AK-47 during the Battle of the Hotels in Lebanon.

== Personal life and death ==
Caputo's first two marriages, to Jill Ongemach and Marcelle Basse, ended in divorce. He had two sons from his first marriage. In 1988, he married Consumer Reports editor Leslie Ware. Caputo died from cancer at his home in Norwalk, Connecticut, on May 7, 2026, at the age of 84.

== Books and articles ==
Caputo's memoir of Vietnam, A Rumor of War (1977), has been published in 15 languages, and has sold two million copies since its first publication. It is widely regarded as a classic in the literature of war. The book was adapted as a 1980 two-part TV movie of the same name, starring Brad Davis, Keith Carradine, Brian Dennehy, and Michael O'Keefe. A Fortieth Anniversary Edition of A Rumor of War was published in summer 2017.

Memory and Desire (2023), Caputo's 18th book, is a novel set in south Florida about love and the persistence of love, about desire and desire remembered, and the reunion of a fifty-year-old man with a son he fathered out of wedlock in his youth.

Wandering Souls: And Other Stories (2025), Caputo's final book, is a collection of short stories that explore war, love, nature, life, and death.

In addition to books, Caputo published dozens of major magazine articles, reviews, and op-ed pieces in publications ranging from The New York Times, The Boston Globe, and The Washington Post to Esquire, National Geographic, and the Virginia Quarterly Review.

== Lecturing and television ==
Caputo lectured at approximately 20 universities and prep schools around the country, and was a featured speaker for the National Book Committee, the American Library Association, and the American Publishers Association. He has participated in the Key West Literary Seminar, Tennessee Williams Literary Festival, Chicago Humanities Festival, and the Cheltenham Literary Festival in Cheltenham, England.

He also worked as a screenwriter for Paramount Pictures and Michael Douglas Productions. Caputo was a guest on the Charlie Rose Show and the Today Show. He narrated or appeared in several TV documentaries on the Vietnam War, the Cold War, and other subjects.

== Bibliography ==
=== Fiction ===
- Horn of Africa. 1980.
- Delcorso's Gallery (1983)
- Indian Country (1987)
- Equation for Evil (1996)
- Exiles (1997)
- The Voyage (1999)
- Acts of Faith (2005) ISBN 0375411666
- Crossers (2009)
- Some Rise by Sin (2017) ISBN 978-1627794749
- Hunter's Moon (2019) ISBN 9781627794763
- Memory and Desire (2023) ISBN 9781956763812
- Wandering Souls: And Other Stories (2025) ISBN 978-1-64821-158-4

=== Nonfiction ===
- Ghosts of Tsavo (2002) ISBN 0792241002
- In the Shadows of the Morning (2002) ISBN 1585745200
- 13 Seconds: A Look Back At the Kent State Shootings (2005) ISBN 1596090804
- Ten Thousand Days of Thunder (2005) ISBN 0689862318
- "The border of madness". The Atlantic. 304 (5): 62–69. December 2009.

Memoir

- A Rumor of War (1977) ISBN 003017631X OCLC 2974701
- Means of Escape (1991) ISBN 0060183128 OCLC 23732376
- The Longest Road (2013) ISBN 978-1250048745

== Filmography ==
- A Rumor of War: Miniseries
- The Vietnam War
