= Franz-Ludwig Schenk Graf von Stauffenberg =

German attorney and politician (born 1938)

Count Franz-Ludwig Schenk von Stauffenberg

Member of the European Parliament; for Germany
- In office 24 July 1984 – 30 November 1992
- Preceded by: Multi-member district
- Succeeded by: Günther Müller

Member of the Bundestag
- In office 13 December 1972 – 20 November 1984
- Preceded by: Franz Gleissner
- Succeeded by: Simon Wittmann
- Constituency: Miesbach (1972–1976); Munich Land (1976–1980); Starnberg (1980–1984)

Personal details
- Born: 4 May 1938 (age 88) Bamberg, Germany
- Party: Christian Social Union; European People's Party (EP)
- Spouse: Elisabeth Freiin von und zu Guttenberg (m. 1965)
- Children: 4
- Parent(s): Claus von Stauffenberg; Elisabeth Magdalena von Lerchenfeld
- Relatives: Stauffenberg family Guttenberg family (by marriage)
- Occupation: Lawyer

Franz-Ludwig Gustav Schenk Graf von Stauffenberg (born 4 May 1938) is a German lawyer and politician from the CSU. He was a member of the Bundestag from 1976 to 1987 and of the European Parliament from 1984 to 1992. He is the son of World War II colonel and resistance leader Claus von Stauffenberg.

== Early life ==
After his father's assassination attempt against Adolf Hitler failed on 20 July 1944, Stauffenberg was sent to a foster home in Bad Sachsa and given the new surname of Meister, as the Nazis viewed the name of Stauffenberg unacceptable, due to the prominence of that name in the assassination attempt. Franz-Ludwig's mother, two older brothers, and younger sister Valerie, as well as other relatives, were arrested under Nazi Sippenhaft (blood guilt) laws. He was educated at the Schule Schloss Salem and then qualified as a lawyer after passing his staatsexamen.

== Political career ==
In 1994, in connection with the commemoration of the 50th anniversary of the 20 July plot, he demanded that communists, who had fought in the Red Army in the National Committee for a Free Germany should not be honored together with his father. According to Stauffenberg, Communists desired to replace the Nazi Party with another single-party dictatorship. This demand gained many prominent supporters, including then-Federal Defence Minister Volker Rühe.

== Personal life and family ==
Franz-Ludwig Gustav Schenk Graf von Stauffenberg is the third son of Claus Schenk Graf von Stauffenberg and Nina Schenk Gräfin von Stauffenberg. Through his mother, he is a fourth cousin of King Charles III of the United Kingdom.

He married Elisabeth Freiin von und zu Guttenberg (born in Pähl on 5 July 1944), on 25 May 1965 in Guttenberg.

=== Children ===
The Stauffenbergs have four children:

- Hans Caspar Erwein Claus Maria Schenk, Graf von Stauffenberg (b. München, 3 March 1966), married civilly at Kirchlauter on 16 August 1995 and religiously at Maria-Thann on 2 September 1995 to S.E.H. Maria Josefa Gabriele Philippa Gräfin von Waldburg zu Zeil und Hohenems (b. Ravensburg, 29 August 1964), and has four children.
- Valerie Sofie Schenk, Gräfin von Stauffenberg (b. Munich, 4 June 1968), married at Kirchlauter on 2 September 1990 Marcus Freiherr von Mauchenheim (b. Murnau, 31 October 1958), and has two sons.
- Maximilian Karl Schenk, Graf von Stauffenberg (b. Munich, 27 October 1970), married at Kirchlauter on 19 August 1995 Harriet von Randow (b. München, 27 November 1974), and has two children.
- Maria Nina Michaela Schenk, Gräfin von Stauffenberg (b. Bamberg, 2 September 1982), married at Kirchlauter on 23 September 2014 to Franz Graf von und zu Westerholt und Gysenberg.

== Honours ==
- 1984: Bayerischer Verdienstorden (Bavarian Order of Merit)
- Knight of the Bavarian Royal Order of Saint George for the Defense of the Immaculate Conception
