= L'Estocq =

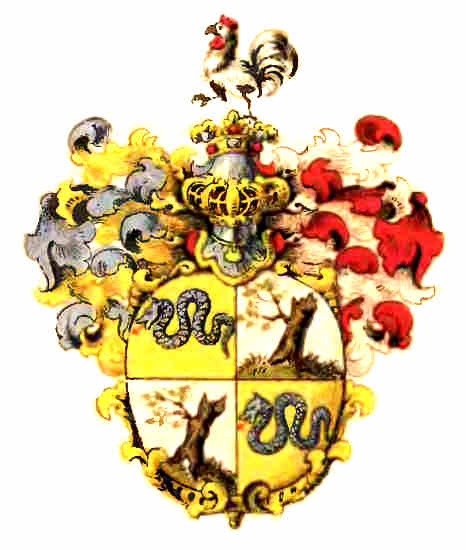
Coat of arms of the L'Estocq family

The L'Estocq family is a German noble family of French-Huguenot origin. Members of the family held significant military positions in the Kingdom of Prussia and Russia.

== Notable members ==
- Jean Armand de L'Estocq (1692–1767), French adventurer
- Anton Wilhelm von L'Estocq (1738–1815), Prussian general
- Johann Ludwig von L'Estocq, brother of Jean
