= Brad Davis (actor) =

American actor (1949–1991)

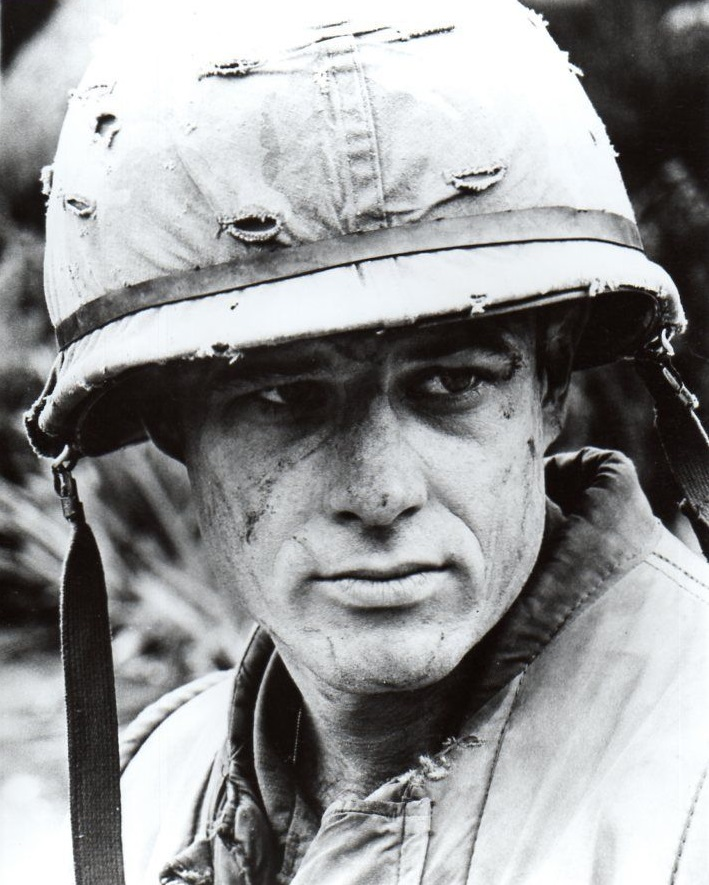
- Davis as Philip Caputo in A Rumor of War (1980)
- Born: Robert Creel Davis; November 6, 1949; Tallahassee, Florida, U.S.
- Died: September 8, 1991 (aged 41); Studio City, California, U.S.
- Resting place: Forest Lawn Memorial Park, Los Angeles, California, U.S.
- Education: American Academy of Dramatic Arts
- Years active: 1974–1991
- Spouse: Susan Bluestein (m. 1976)
- Children: 1

Robert Creel Davis (November 6, 1949 – September 8, 1991), known professionally as Brad Davis, was an American actor. For his debut film role as Billy Hayes in the 1978 film Midnight Express, he won the Golden Globe Award for New Star of the Year – Actor and was nominated for Best Actor – Motion Picture Drama, along with BAFTA Award nominations for Best Actor in a Leading Role and Most Promising Newcomer to Leading Film Roles.

Davis subsequently played the title role in the Rainer Werner Fassbinder film Querelle (1982), and appeared in such films as A Small Circle of Friends (1980), Chariots of Fire (1981), and Cold Steel (1987). He also starred in television films and miniseries.

Davis, who struggled with substance abuse issues throughout his adult life, was diagnosed with HIV in 1985, and died by assisted suicide from a drug overdose in 1991.

== Biography ==
=== Early life ===
He was born in Tallahassee, Florida, to Eugene Davis, a dentist whose career declined due to alcoholism, and his wife, Anne (née Creel) Davis. His brother Gene is also an actor. Davis was known as Bobby during his youth, but took Brad as his stage name in 1973. He attended and graduated from Titusville High School.

According to a 1997 New York Times interview with his widow Susan Bluestein, Davis suffered physical abuse from his father and sexual abuse from his mother. As an adult, Davis was an alcoholic and an intravenous drug user, then became sober in 1981. Davis was bisexual.

=== Early acting roles ===
At 16, after winning a music-talent contest, Davis worked at Theater Atlanta. He later moved to New York City and attended the American Academy of Dramatic Arts, and the American Place Theater where he studied acting. After a role on the soap opera How to Survive a Marriage in 1974, he performed in Off-Broadway plays.

In 1976, he was cast in the television mini-series Roots, then as Sally Field's love interest in the television film Sybil. The same year, he married casting director Susan Bluestein. They would have one child together, Alex Blue Davis (b. 1983), a musician and actor.

In 1977, he was cast as John Rambo in First Blood when John Frankenheimer was scheduled to direct the film before it was cancelled due to Orion Pictures' acquisition of Filmways.

=== Midnight Express and stardom ===
His most successful film role was as the main character Billy Hayes in Midnight Express (1978), for which he won the Golden Globe Award for New Star of the Year – Actor. He was nominated for a similar award at that year's BAFTA Awards, in addition to receiving Best Actor nominations at both ceremonies (Richard Dreyfuss won for The Goodbye Girl).

In 1980, Davis would play US Marine Officer Phil Caputo in the biographical made-for-television film A Rumor of War. The same year, he would be top-billed for his role in the film A Small Circle of Friends.

In 1981, he played American track star Jackson Scholz in the Academy Award-winning film Chariots of Fire.

In 1982, Davis played the title role of Georges Querelle in the film Querelle, Rainer Werner Fassbinder's final film before his death by a drug overdose. That same year, he starred in Steven Berkoff's stage adaptation of The Metamorphosis at the Mark Taper Forum.

=== Supporting roles and television films ===
Davis played the lead role of Ned Weeks in The Normal Heart (1985), Larry Kramer's play about AIDS.

While continuing to play supporting roles in theatrical films, Davis appeared regularly in made-for-television films, including Chiefs, Robert Kennedy & His Times, The Rainbow Warrior Conspiracy, and The Plot to Kill Hitler. He played Queeg in a 1988 television adaptation of The Caine Mutiny Court-Martial, directed by Robert Altman, opposite Eric Bogosian and Jeff Daniels.

== Illness and death ==
Diagnosed with HIV in 1985, Davis kept his condition private until shortly before his death at age 41 on September 8, 1991, in Los Angeles. In 1997, his wife Susan claimed that he probably contracted HIV through intravenous drug use, and that he died by assisted suicide from a drug overdose. It was revealed in a book proposal that Davis had written before his death that he had to keep his HIV-positive status a secret to be able to continue to work and support his family.

He is interred at Forest Lawn Memorial Park in the Hollywood Hills.

== Filmography ==
=== Film ===
Year	Title	Role	Director	Notes
1976	Eat My Dust!	Bit role	Charles B. Griffith	Uncredited
1978	Midnight Express	Billy Hayes	Alan Parker	
1980	A Small Circle of Friends	Leonardo da Vinci Rizzo	Rob Cohen	
1981	Chariots of Fire	Jackson Scholz	Hugh Hudson	
1982	Querelle	Querelle	Rainer Werner Fassbinder	
1987	Heart	Eddie	James Lemmo	
1987	Cold Steel	Johnny Modine	Dorothy Ann Puzo	
1989	Rosalie Goes Shopping	Ray "Liebling" Greenspace	Percy Adlon	
1991	Hangfire	Sheriff Ike Slayton	Peter Maris	
1992	The Player	Himself	Robert Altman	Posthumous release Cameo appearance

=== Television ===
Year	Title	Role	Notes
1974	How to Survive a Marriage	Alexander Kronos	Unknown episodes
1976	The American Parade	Streetcar Conductor / Thomas Nast	Episodes: "Song of Myself", "Stop Thief"
1976	Sybil	Richard J. Loomis	Miniseries
1976	The Secret Life of Ol' John Chapman	Andy	TV movie
1977	Roots	George "Ol' George" Johnson	Miniseries
1977	Baretta	Ray	Episode: "Guns and Brothers"
1980	The Greatest Man in the World	Jimmy Schmurch	TV movie
1980	A Rumor of War	Lieutenant Phil Caputo	TV movie
1981	BBC2 Playhouse	Young American	Episode: "Mrs. Reinhardt"
1983	Chiefs	Sonny Butts	Miniseries
1985	Robert Kennedy & His Times	Robert F. Kennedy	Miniseries
1985	The New Alfred Hitchcock Presents	Arthur	Episode: "Arthur, or the Gigolo"
1986	The Twilight Zone	Arthur Lewis	Episode: "Button, Button"
1986	Blood Ties	Julian Salina	TV movie
1986	Vengeance: The Story of Tony Cimo	Tony Cimo	TV movie
1987	The Hitchhiker	Jerry Rulac	Episode: "Why Are You Here?"
1987	When the Time Comes	Dean	TV movie
1988	The Caine Mutiny Court-Martial	Lieutenant Commander Phillip Francis Queeg	TV movie
1989	The Rainbow Warrior Conspiracy	Neil Travers	TV movie
1989	The Edge	Kenny	TV movie
1990	Unspeakable Acts	Joseph Braga	TV movie
1990	The Plot to Kill Hitler	Colonel Claus von Stauffenberg	TV movie
1991	Child of Darkness, Child of Light	Dr. Phinney	TV movie
1992	The Habitation of Dragons	George Tolliver	Posthumous release TV movie

== Partial stage credits ==
Year	Title	Role	Director	Venue	Notes	Ref.
1975	Four Friends	Mike	Alfred Gingold	Theatre de Lys, New York City		
1981-82	Entertaining Mr Sloane	Mr. Sloane	John Tillinger	Cherry Lane Theatre, New York City	Replacement	
1982	Metamorphosis	Gregor Samsa	Steven Berkoff	Mark Taper Forum, Los Angeles		
1983	Toyer	Peter	Tony Richardson	Kennedy Center, Washington, D.C.		
1985-86	The Normal Heart	Ned Weeks	Michael Lindsay-Hogg	Public Theatre, New York City		

== Awards and nominations ==
Institution	Year	Category	Nominated work	Result	Ref.
British Academy Film Awards	1979	Best Actor in a Leading Role	Midnight Express	Nominated	
British Academy Film Awards	1979	Best Newcomer	Midnight Express	Nominated	
Golden Globe Awards	1979	Best Actor – Motion Picture Drama	Midnight Express	Nominated	
Golden Globe Awards	1979	New Star of the Year – Actor	Midnight Express	Won	
Kansas City Film Critics Circle Awards	1978	Best Actor	Midnight Express	Won	
