= A Rumor of War (miniseries) =

- Genre: Biography; Drama; War
- Based on: Philip Caputo
- Written by: John Sacret Young
- Directed by: Richard T. Heffron
- Starring: Brad Davis; Keith Carradine; Michael O'Keefe; Brian Dennehy; Stacy Keach
- Theme music composer: Charles Gross
- Country of origin: United States
- Original language: English

Production
- Executive producers: Richard Berg; Charles W. Fries
- Producer: David Manson
- Production locations: Marine Corps Air Station, El Toro, California; Marine Corps Base, Camp Pendleton, California; Churubusco Studios, Mexico City, Distrito Federal, Mexico; Puerto Vallarta, Jalisco, Mexico; Villahermosa, Tabasco, Mexico
- Cinematography: Stevan Larner; Jorge Stahl Jr.
- Editors: Michael Eliot; Scott C. Eyler; Thomas Fries
- Running time: 191 min.
- Production companies: Charles Fries Productions; Dick Berg-Stonehenge Productions

Original release
- Network: CBS
- Release: September 24 – September 25, 1980

A Rumor of War is a 1980 American television miniseries, based on the 1977 autobiography by Philip Caputo about his service in the United States Marine Corps in the early years of American involvement in the Vietnam War. The series aired on CBS from September 24 to September 25, 1980.

The miniseries was filmed at Camp Pendleton and Churubusco Studios, Mexico with a cast featuring Brad Davis, Keith Carradine, Brian Dennehy, Richard Bradford, Michael O'Keefe, Stacy Keach, Lane Smith, Christopher Mitchum and Jeff Daniels in one of his earliest on-screen roles. The producers could not find enough Sikorsky HUS-1 helicopters so used UH-1 Huey helicopters instead.

== Synopsis ==
A Rumor of War recounts Philip Caputo's journal of his combat experiences in Indochina during the Vietnam War and follows his transformation from a patriotic college graduate to proud US Marine lieutenant to battle-hardened war veteran.

== Cast ==
- Brad Davis as Lieutenant Philip "Phil" Caputo
- Keith Carradine as Lieutenant Murphy "Murph" McCoy
- Michael O'Keefe as Lieutenant Walter Cohen
- Richard Bradford as General Merle Rupert
- Brian Dennehy as Sergeant Ned Coleman
- John Friedrich as Corporal Pascarella
- Perry Lang as Woodward
- Christopher Mitchum as Captain Peterson
- Dan Shor as "Manhole"
- Lane Smith as Sergeant William Holgren
- Nicholas Woodeson as Corporal Kazmarak
- Gail Youngs as Carol
- Steve Forrest as Colonel Atherton
- Stacy Keach as Major Ball
- Phillip R. Allen as Colonel Perry
- Michael Cavanaugh as Captain Lake
- Bobby Ellerbee as Corporal Mackey
- David Elliott as Sullivan
- Laurence Fishburne as "Lightbulb"
- Redmond Gleeson as Sergeant Furth
- Edward Grover as Coker
- Gavan O'Herlihy as Stanton
- Christopher Allport as Van Cott
- Jeff Daniels as Chaplain
- John Herzfeld as Drill Instructor
- Helaine Lembeck as Lisa Modesta
- Sandy McPeak as Joe Caputo
- Chris Mulkey as Radio Man
- Enrique Novi as Jose Ramirez
- Sean Roche as Hodgkins
- Steven Rotblatt as Zirpoli
- Al Ruscio as Uncle Al
- Koko Tani as Simone
- Shere Thu Thuy as Le Dung's Wife
- Marion Yue as Hoa
- David Chow as The Mayor of Da Nang
- Eunice Christopher as Mrs. Caputo
- Oliver Chung as Le Dung
- Alex Daniels as Stasek
- John Diehl as D.T.
- John Ferrand as Sergeant Whitaker
- Ken Foree as The M.P.
- Karen Kondazian as Mrs. Modesta
- Lynn Kuratomi as Yip Yap
- Joe Lowry as Winslow
- Dani Minnick as Miss Cunningham
- Scott Mulhern as The Priest
- Qui Van Ngo as ARVN Interrogator
- Rodney Saulsberry as Sergeant Wehr
- Robert B. Green as Corporal Beckett
