= General court-martial =

General court-martial may refer to:

- General court-martial in the United States, the highest military court level in the United States
- General court-martial (GCM) in Ireland, the highest class of court-martial in the Irish Defence Forces
