= Bad Sachsa =

Town in Lower Saxony, Germany

- Town
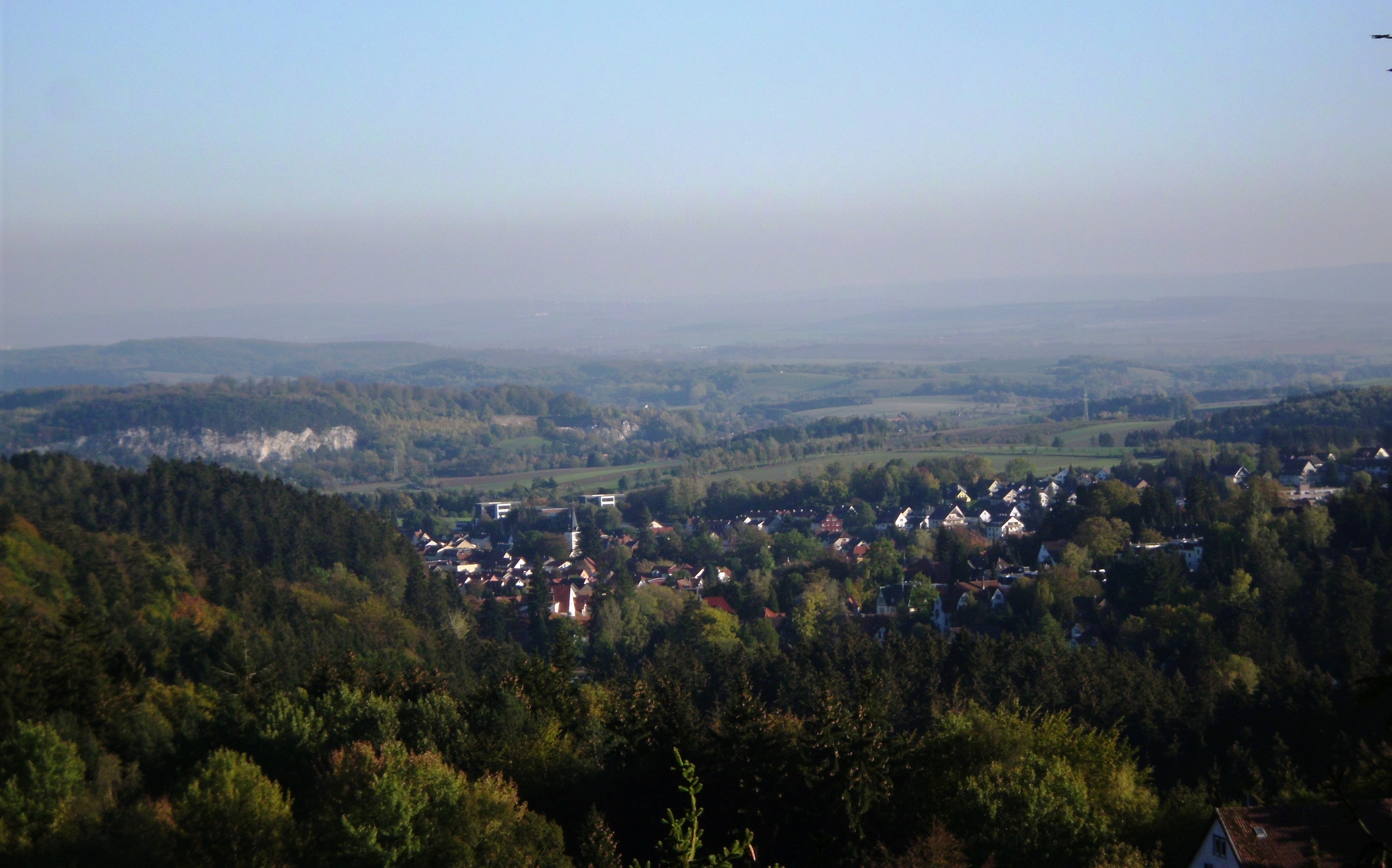
- Bad Sachsa

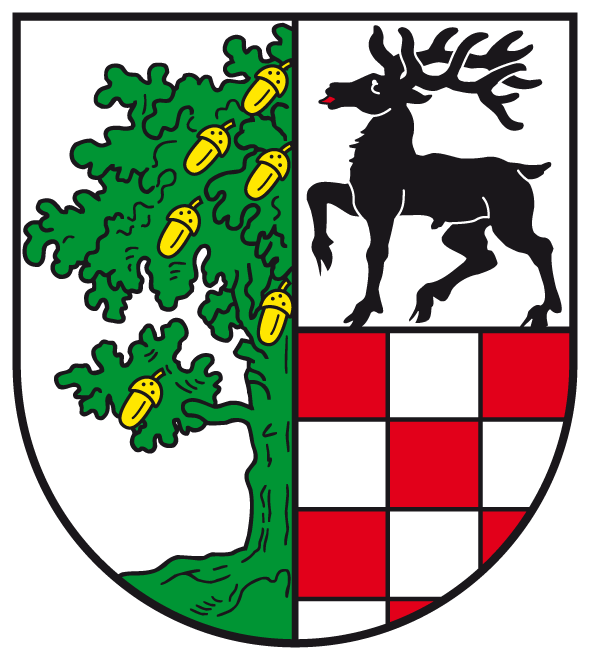
- Coat of arms

- Location of Bad Sachsa within Göttingen district
- Interactive map of Bad Sachsa
- Location within Germany Location within Lower Saxony
- Coordinates: 51°35′49″N 10°33′08″E
- Country: Germany
- State: Lower Saxony
- District: Göttingen

Government
  - Mayor (2020–25): Daniel Quade (FDP)

Area
  - Total: 33.2 km^{2} (12.8 sq mi)
- Elevation: 310 m (1,020 ft)

Population (2025-12-31)
  - Total: 7,180
  - Density: 216/km^{2} (560/sq mi)
- Time zone: UTC+01:00 (CET)
  - Summer (DST): UTC+02:00 (CEST)
- Postal codes: 37441
- Dialling codes: 05523, 05525
- Vehicle registration: GÖ, OHA
- Website: www.bad-sachsa.de

Bad Sachsa (German pronunciation: [baːt ˈzaksa]) is a town in the district of Göttingen, in Lower Saxony, Germany. The town was one of the few municipalities in West Germany that imported electric power from former East Germany. This was done via Neuhof Substation.

== Geography ==
Bad Sachsa is situated in the southern Harz, approximately 15 km south of Braunlage, and 25 km southeast of Osterode am Harz.

== History ==
The oldest existing document in which Sachsa is mentioned was written in 1229. The settlement officially gained town status in 1525. Tourism started around 1860. After the town had been recognized as a health resort by the government in 1905 the name was changed to "Bad Sachsa" with "Bad" meaning spa.

Bad Sachsa is known for being the town where Berthold Maria Schenk Graf von Stauffenberg and his four siblings were sent by the Nazis in 1944, following the failed 20 July plot. Their father was executed and their pregnant mother was interned in a concentration camp with two elders. The Stauffenberg children lived in Bad Sachsa during 1944-45. Other families of the executed officers were imprisoned here. All were left there without their parents and with changed names.

=== Winter Sports ===
Ravensberg Mountain (660 metres) offering a scenic view of the whole Harz is used for various winter sports.

=== Sights ===
- The Town Hall was built in a Jugendstil style which was very popular in Germany at the beginning of the 20th century. It has several oriels, a veranda and a pavilion. The conference hall represents the Jugendstil style in a very typical way. The Town Hall which is surrounded by half-timbered mansions is in a small park.
- St. Nikolai Church

The Protestant church was built on a small hill in the town center offering a scenic view of Marktstrasse, the High Street of Bad Sachsa and the colourful Market Place. The Romanesque clock tower of the church was built in the middle of the 12th century. The nave was added around 1300. The altar dating from 1595 was financed by Hansen Hartmann, the then mayor of Bad Sachsa. In 1691 a half-timbered aisle was added to the church the pulpit of which dates from 1711.

- Römerstein Rocks

Near the suburb of Steina in the southwest of Bad Sachsa the Römerstein Rocks are worth a visit. The coralline rocks were formed about 250 million years ago. Relics of a settlement were found close by. They are estimated to be about 10,000 years old.

- Sachsenburg Ruins

The ruins of Sachsenburg Castle can be visited in the southwest of the town. The castle was built in the 11th century and destroyed in 1074. The most impressive part is a tower with a diameter of more than ten metres. Excavations were carried out here in 1891-93. The castle can only be reached on a walking track starting from Blomberg street in the southeastern part of the town. It is in the forest near a railway track which must not be crossed by pedestrians.

- Grenzland Museum

Grenzland Museum was founded in the suburb of Tettenborn in 1992 and is dedicated to the Inner German border which was less than one mile away from Bad Sachsa.

=== Traffic connections ===
Bad Sachsa is easily accessible by train as it has a railway station on the South Harz Railway. The neighbouring towns and villages can be reached by bus.

=== Sights ===
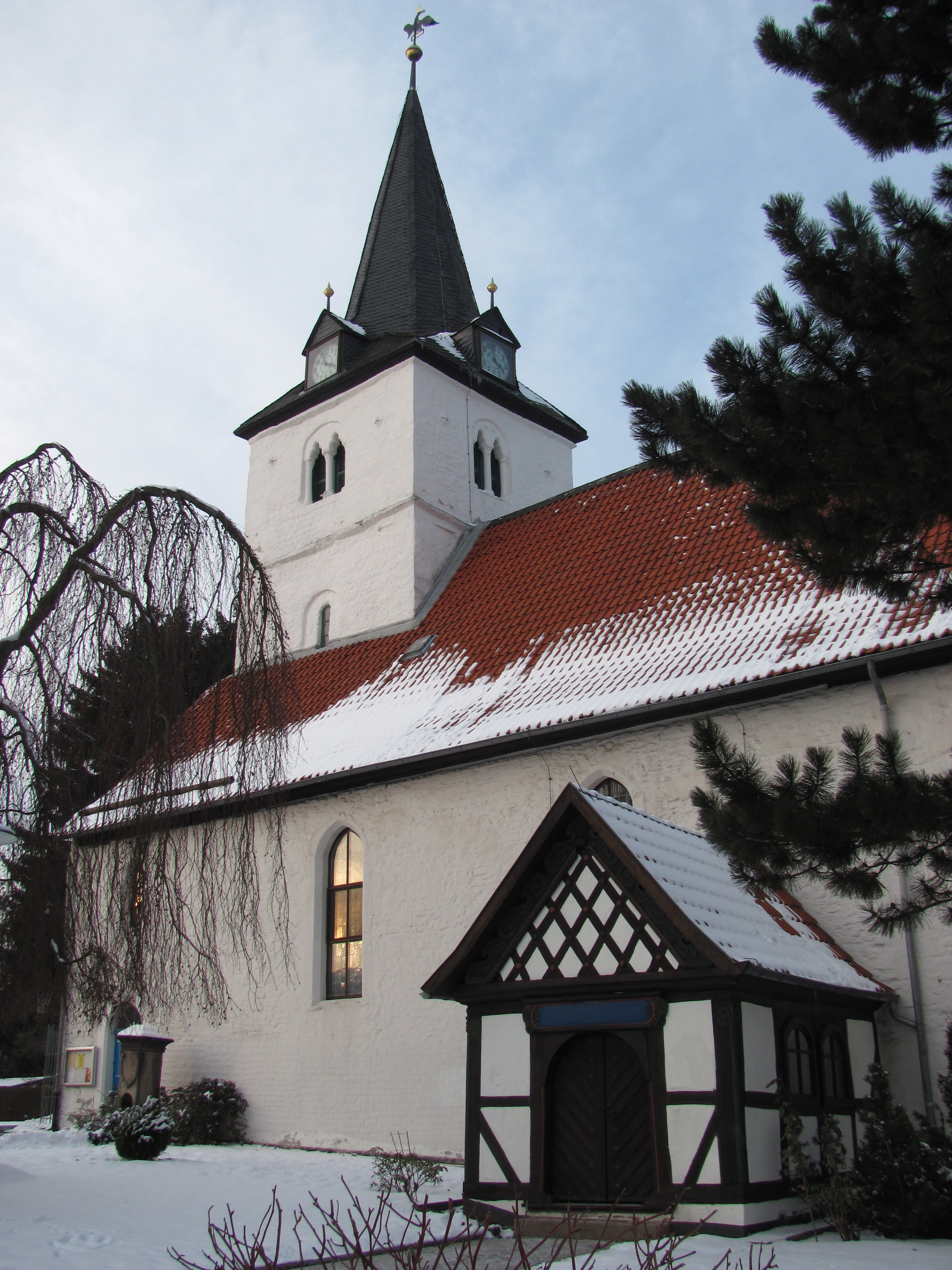
St. Nikolai Church

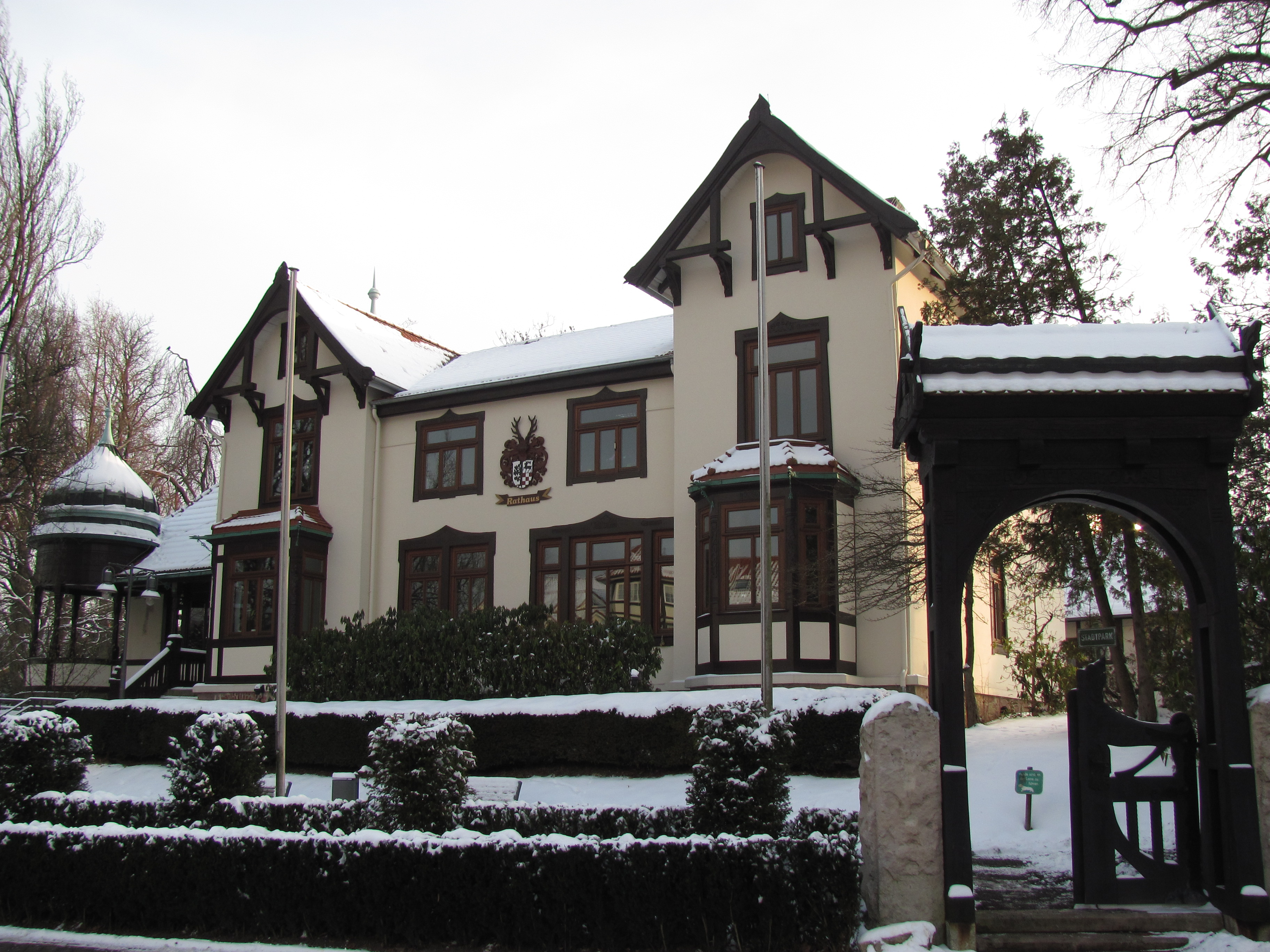
Town Hall

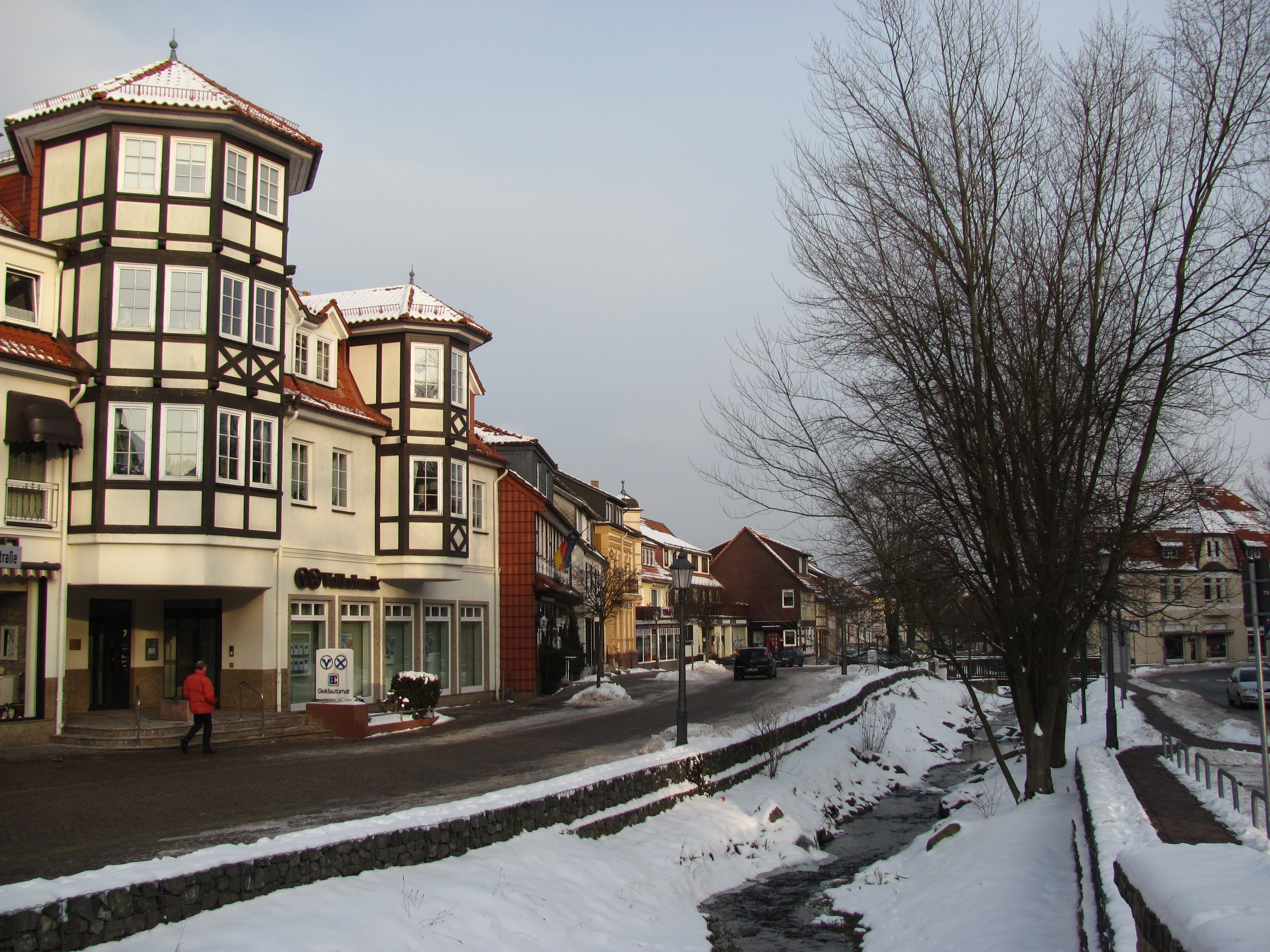
River Uffe opposite the Town Hall

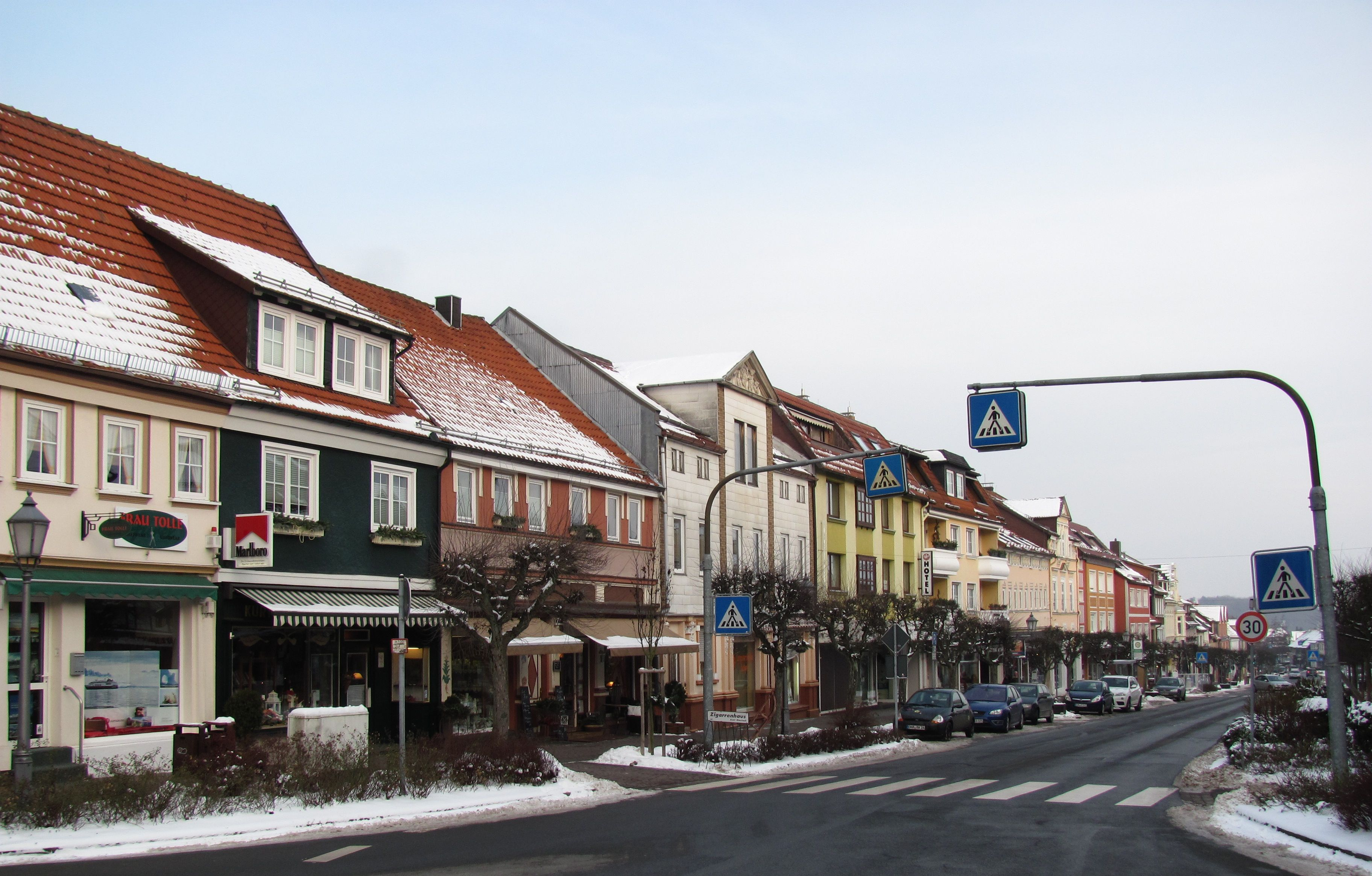
High Street

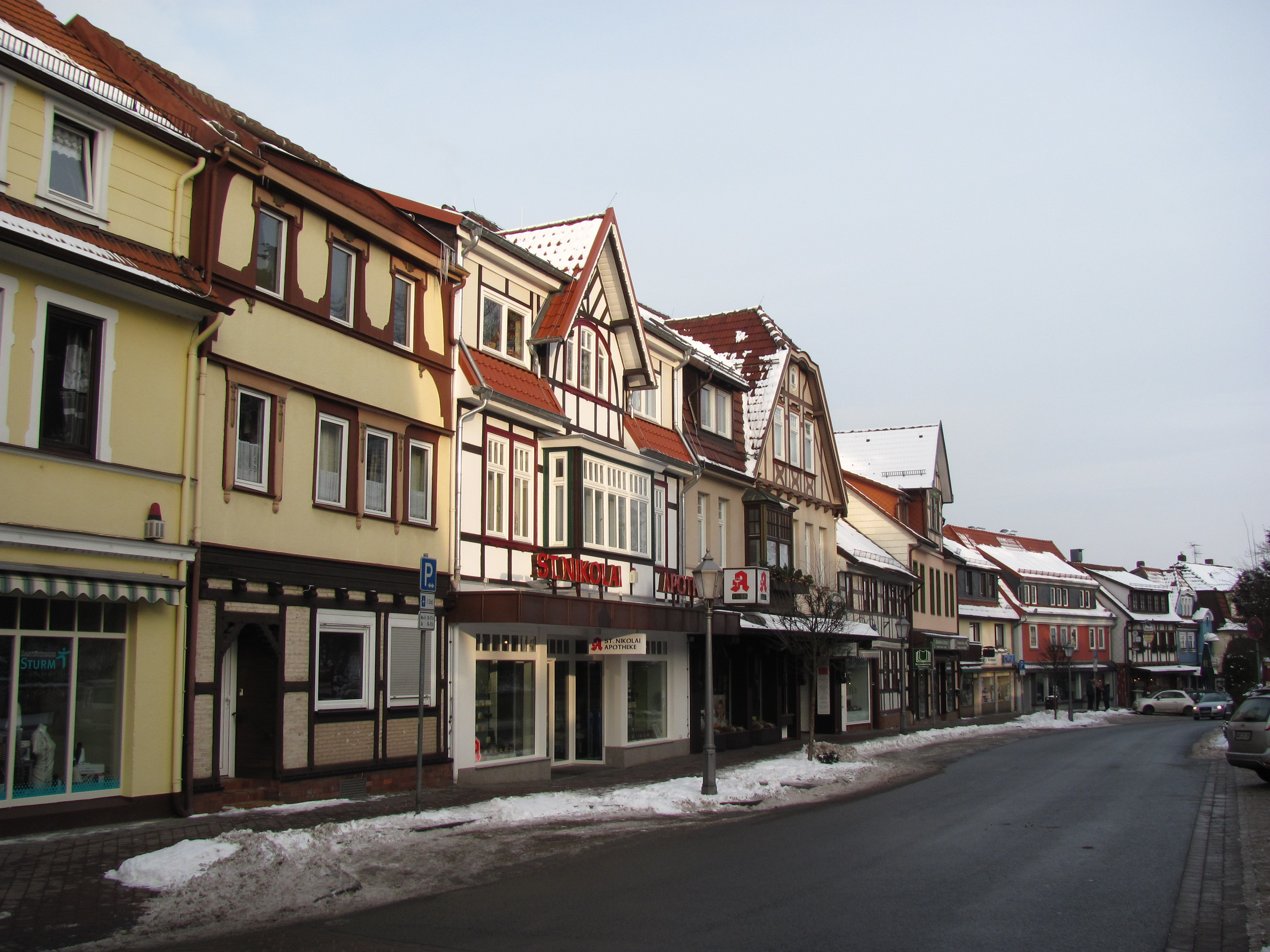
Market Place

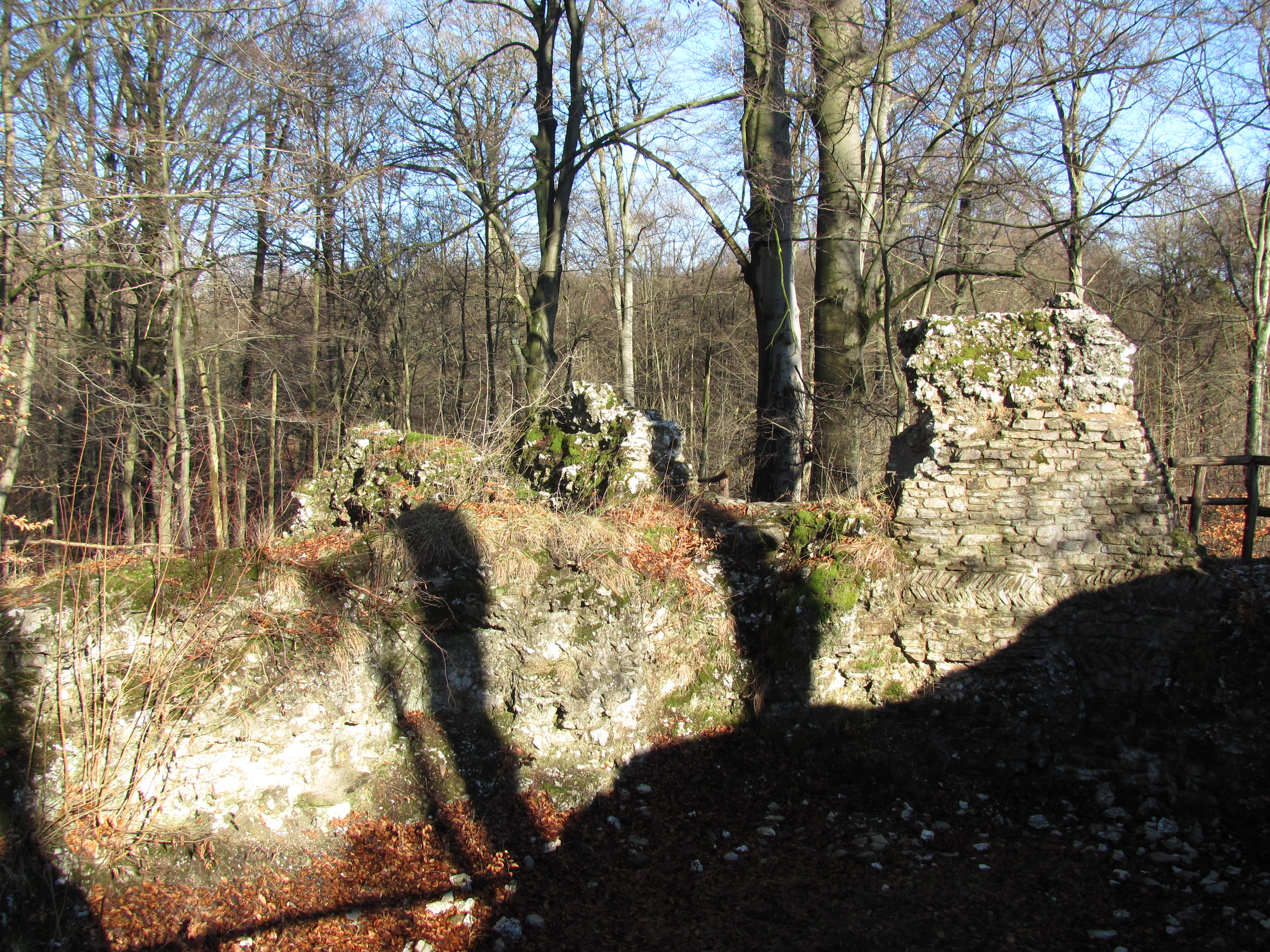
Sachsenburg Ruins

== Notable people ==
- Klaus Bühler (born 1941), politician
- Rolf Kalmuczak (1938–2007), writer, student of Pädagogium Bad Sachsa
- Veruschka von Lehndorff (born 1939), actress, fashion model, painter and photographer; was interned as a child after the failed assassination attempt on 20 July 1944 on Adolf Hitler in Bad Sachsa, because her father was a participant of the plot
- Alexandra (1942–1969), singer, spent often holidays in Bad Sachsa and was inspired by the Wilhelm Bobring song "My Friend the tree" (Mein Freund der Baum)
- Hans-Heinrich Sander (1945–2017), FDP Minister of Environment and Member of Parliament in Lower Saxony
- Lutz Hoffmann (1959–1997), gymnast and teacher
