= Kirchlauter =

- Municipality
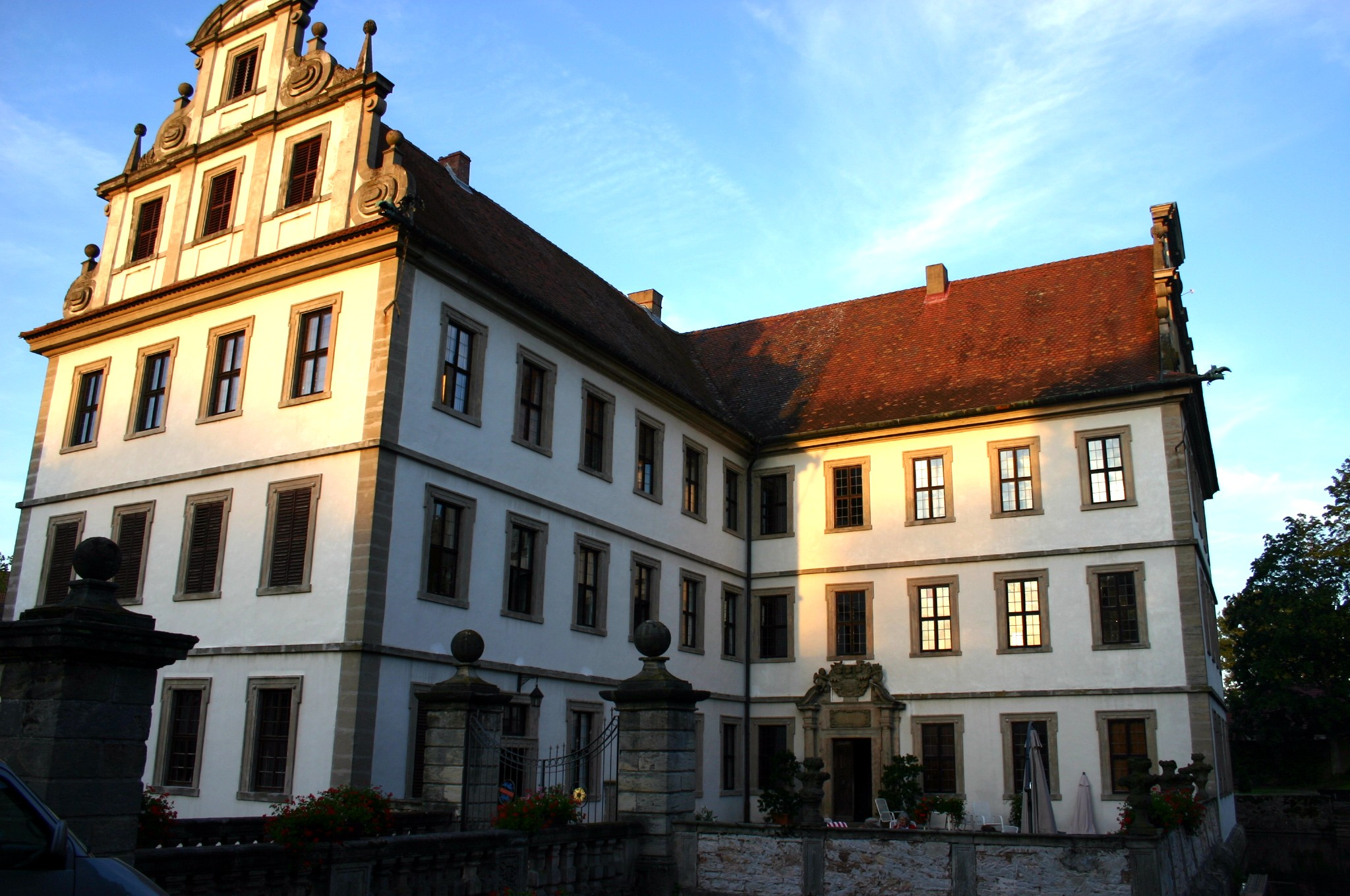
- Kirchlauter Castle, home of Franz-Ludwig Schenk Graf von Stauffenberg

- Coat of arms

- Location of Kirchlauter within Haßberge district
- Interactive map of Kirchlauter
- Location within Germany Location within Bavaria
- Coordinates: 50°2′39″N 10°43′4″E
- Country: Germany
- State: Bavaria
- Admin. region: Unterfranken
- District: Haßberge
- Municipal assoc.: Ebelsbach

Government
  - Mayor (2020–26): Karl-Heinz Kandler (SPD)

Area
  - Total: 16.92 km^{2} (6.53 sq mi)
- Elevation: 344 m (1,129 ft)

Population (2025-12-31)
  - Total: 1,320
  - Density: 78.0/km^{2} (202/sq mi)
- Time zone: UTC+01:00 (CET)
  - Summer (DST): UTC+02:00 (CEST)
- Postal codes: 96166
- Dialling codes: 09536
- Vehicle registration: HAS
- Website: www.vg-ebelsbach.de

Kirchlauter is a municipality in the Bavarian Administrative Region of Lower Franconia in the district of Haßberge in Germany. It is a part of the Verwaltungsgemeinde of Ebelsbach.

== Geography ==
Kirchlauter lies in the Main-Rhön Region (Bavarian Planungsregion 3).

It consists of the following boroughs: Kirchlauter, Neubrunn, and Pettstadt.

== History ==
The municipality was first documented on 30, December, 1145. Kirchlauter belonged to the manor of the Barons (Freiherren) of Guttenberg. Traditionally part of Bavaria, in 1810 it became a part of the Grand Duchy of Würzburg, with which it became part of Bavaria for the final time in 1814.

== Politics ==
The Municipal Council of Kirchlauter is made up of 13 councilmen, including the town's mayor, Jochen Steppert (CSU).

The mandate assignments in the Municipal Council are CSU 7, SPD 4, Junge Liste 1, and Free Voters 1.
