= Berthold Maria Schenk Graf von Stauffenberg =

German retired Bundeswehr general (born 1934)

Generalmajor Berthold Maria Schenk Graf von Stauffenberg
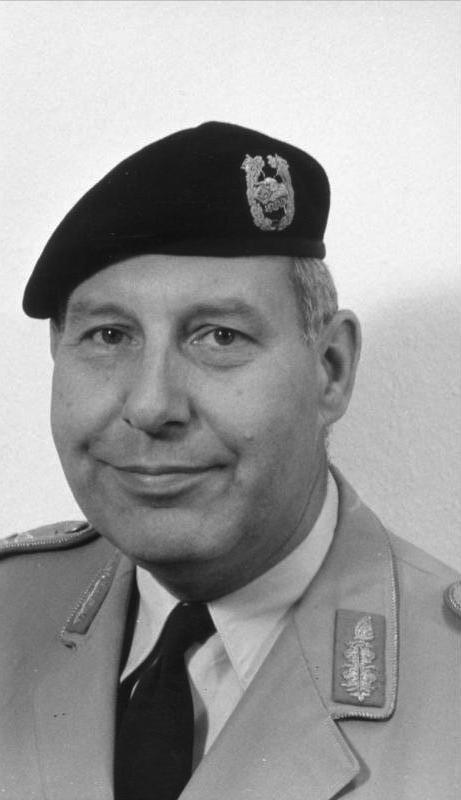
- Graf von Stauffenberg in 1993
- Born: 3 July 1934 (age 92); Bamberg, Germany
- Relatives: Claus Schenk Graf von Stauffenberg (father); Berthold Schenk Graf von Stauffenberg (uncle)
- Military career
- Allegiance: West Germany
- Branch: German Army
- Service years: 1956–1994
- Rank: Generalmajor (Major General)
- Commands: Armoured Reconnaissance Training Battalion 11; Home Defence Brigade 56; Territorial Command South

Generalmajor Berthold Maria Schenk Graf von Stauffenberg (Note: Regarding personal names, Graf von ... is a German title, translated as Count of ..., not a first or middle name. The feminine form is Gräfin.) (born 3 July 1934) is a German retired Bundeswehr general. Early in his career, he commanded Germany's largest military base. At the time of his retirement in 1994 he was Germany's longest serving soldier, having served in the Heer (Army) for thirty-eight years. He is the son of World War II colonel and resistance leader Claus von Stauffenberg.

== Early life ==
Stauffenberg is the oldest of five children of Oberst Claus Schenk Graf von Stauffenberg and a nephew of Berthold Schenk Graf von Stauffenberg, two German noblemen who were active in the 20 July plot to assassinate Adolf Hitler.

After the failed assassination and the subsequent executions, Stauffenberg's pregnant mother Nina Schenk Gräfin von Stauffenberg was interned in a concentration camp and separated from her four children, who were taken to a foster home in Bad Sachsa. Until the end of the war, they were forced to use a different family name, as Schenk von Stauffenberg was not accepted as their name. Berthold Maria Schenk Graf von Stauffenberg was the oldest of the children and had just turned ten at the time of the failed assassination plot.

Through his mother, he is a fourth cousin of King Charles III of the United Kingdom and the Commonwealth realms.

== Military career ==
Stauffenberg was educated at Schule Schloss Salem before studying engineering at Friedrich-Alexander University of Erlangen-Nuremberg and becoming an officer in West Germany's new army as soon as it was established in 1956.

From 1972 to 1974, he commanded Armoured Reconnaissance Training Battalion 11 at Munster, Lower Saxony, Germany's largest military base. His career culminated in promotion to Supreme Commander of Territorial Command South, and he retired in 1994 with the rank of General major. He was Germany's longest serving soldier, after 38 years in the Bundeswehr.

== Family ==
In Thurn on 22 September 1958, he married Mechthild Kunigunde Gräfin Bentzel von Sternau und Hohenau von Sturmfelder-Horneck (born 27 January 1938 in Bamberg), and they established a home in her family's hometown of Oppenweiler in Southern Germany. They have three sons:

- Claus Philipp Schenk Graf von Stauffenberg (born 1 June 1959), married to Iranian-born Maryam Zahedi (born 31 January 1962); they have two children.
- Sebastian Heimrich Schenk Graf von Stauffenberg (b. 2 December 1961), unmarried and without issue
- Gottfried Schenk Graf von Stauffenberg (b. 8 October 1964), unmarried and without issue

In July 2004, for his 70th birthday and for the 60th anniversary of the 20 July plot in which his father took part, Stauffenberg was interviewed by several newspapers and was also invited to a ceremony at the former Wolfsschanze. In 2006, he participated with Richard von Weizsäcker and others in the opening ceremony of the Stauffenberg Memorial in Stuttgart.

In 2007, Stauffenberg voiced concerns about the film Valkyrie, because the actor portraying his father, Tom Cruise, was a member of the Church of Scientology. He feared that the film could become "horrible kitsch".
