= Peoples of Europe, preserve your most sacred goods! =

Picture by Hermann Knackfuß

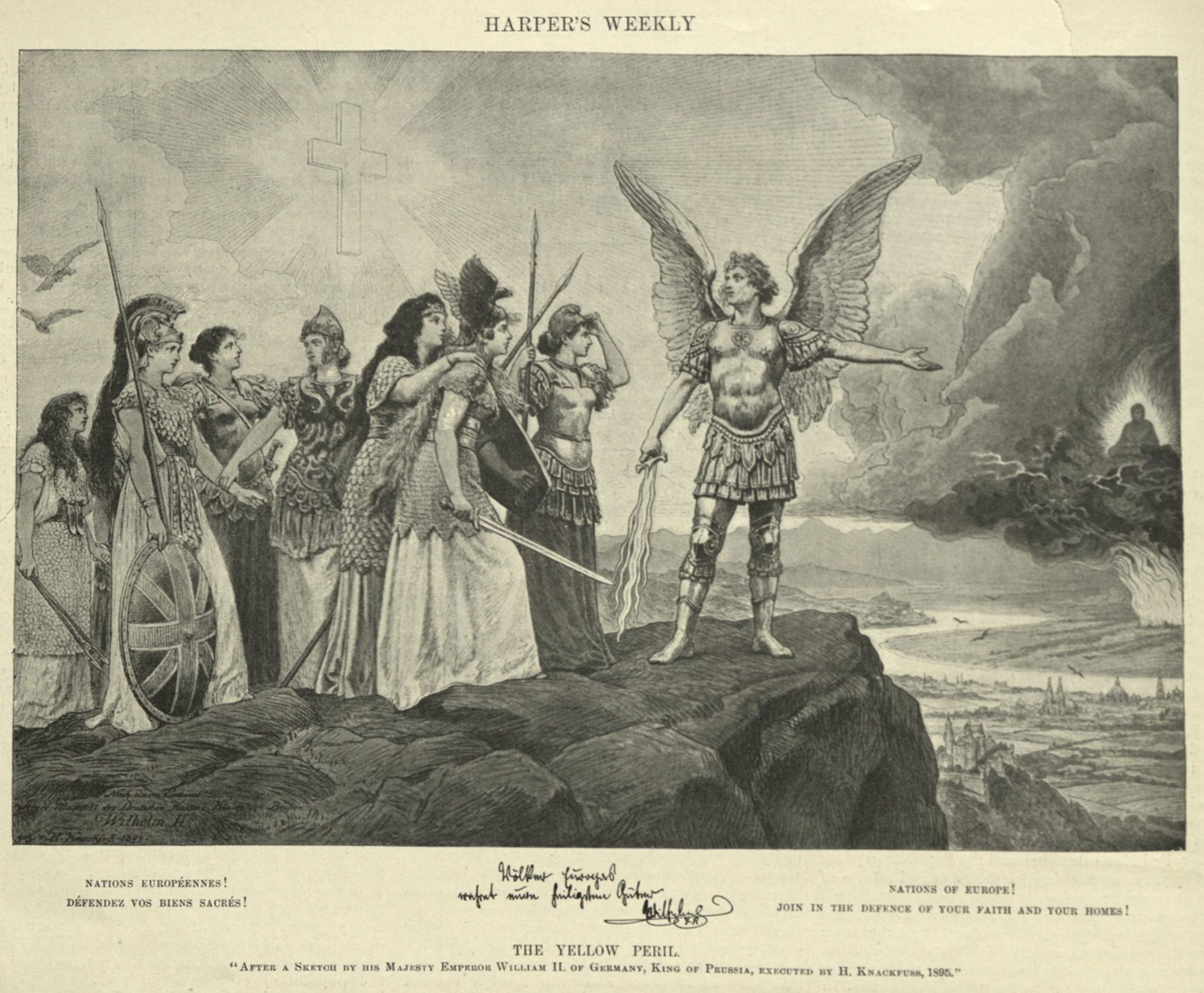
Kaiser Wilhelm II used the allegorical lithograph Peoples of Europe, Preserve your most Sacred Goods! (1895), by Hermann Knackfuss, to promote Yellow Peril ideology as geopolitical justification for European colonialism in China.

Peoples of Europe, preserve your most sacred goods! (German: Völker Europas, wahret eure heiligsten Güter!) is a picture made by the history painter Hermann Knackfuß after a design by Emperor Wilhelm II in 1895, as a gift from the German Emperor to the Russian Tsar Nicholas II

== Description ==
Depicted is Archangel Michael (as patron saint of the Germans), who, surrounded by a number of women symbolising the peoples of Europe as national allegories (Germania, Britannia etc.), points to a Buddha hovering in dark storm clouds over a European landscape from the east.

With this allegorical Wilhelm II wanted to call on European Christendom to fight together against the Yellow Peril or godless Buddhism.

Kaiser Wilhelm presented this painting to the Russian Tsar with the request to keep the influences from the East under control (the imminent danger of a Chinese onslaught mobilised by Japan). The Tsar was so pleased with the work that the Emperor was able to state with satisfaction: "Well, it works, that is very pleasing."

The female figures, seen from right to left, are personifications of France (Marianne), Germany (Germania), Russia (Mother Russia), Austria-Hungary (Austria), Italy (Italia turrita) and Great Britain (Britannia). The last on the far left is not named.

A few years later, on 27 July 1900, Wilhelm delivered the so-called Hun speech. The occasion was the adoption of the German East Asian Expeditionary Corps against the Boxer Rebellion, in which Germans and Christian missionaries were also killed.

== Further ==
The painting was used in Joachim Fest's 1977 documentary film Hitler: A Career and was intended to illustrate the world view of Hitler and some of his contemporaries.
