= Operation Valkyrie =

German plan for putting down civil unrest, repurposed for planned coup, WW2

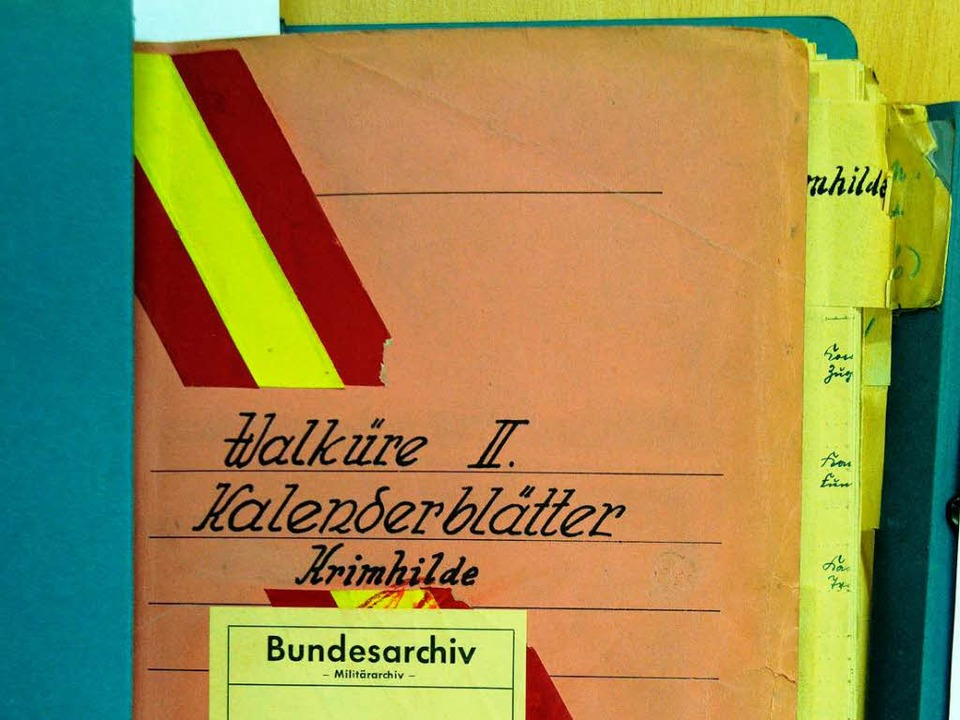
Operation Valkyrie 2 cover in the Bundesarchiv

Operation Valkyrie (German: Unternehmen Walküre) was a German World War II emergency continuity-of-government operations plan issued to the Territorial Reserve Army of Germany to implement in the event of a general breakdown in national civil order due to Allied bombing of German cities, or an uprising of the millions of foreign forced labourers working in German factories.

German Army (Heer) officers, General Friedrich Olbricht, Generalmajor Henning von Tresckow and Oberst Claus von Stauffenberg modified the plan with the intention of using it to take control of German cities, disarm the SS, and arrest the Nazi leadership once Hitler had been assassinated in the 20 July plot. Hitler's death (as opposed to his arrest) was required to free German soldiers from their oath of loyalty to him (Reichswehreid). After lengthy preparation, the plot was activated in 1944, but failed.

== The original operation ==
The original plan, designed to deal with internal disturbances in emergency situations, ensured combat readiness of units among scattered elements of the Reserve Army. It was developed by General Friedrich Olbricht's staff in his capacity as head of General Army Office and was approved by Hitler. However, apart from Hitler himself, only Colonel-General Friedrich Fromm, Chief of the Reserve Army since 1938, could initiate Operation Valkyrie.

== Coup-oriented revisions ==
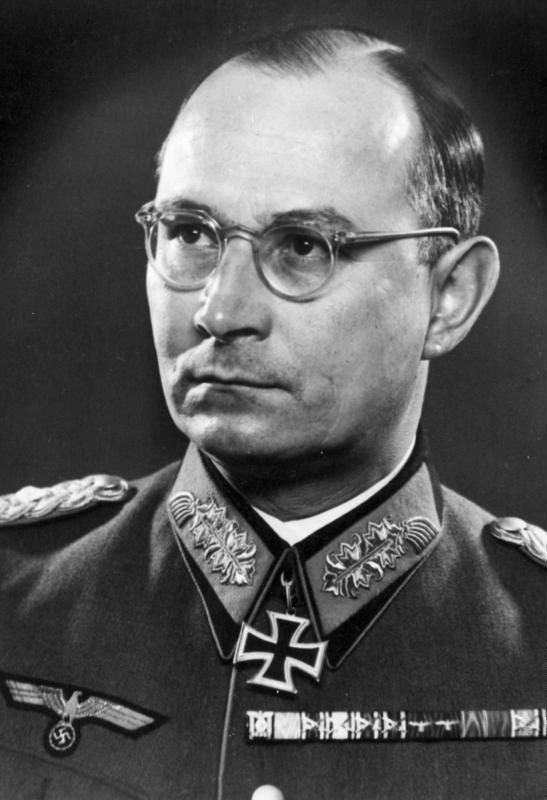
Friedrich Olbricht

The idea of using the Reserve Army in the German homeland to unseat the Nazi regime had existed before, but Fromm's refusal to cooperate in a prospective coup posed a serious obstacle to the conspirators. Nevertheless, after the lessons of a failed assassination attempt on 13 March 1943, Olbricht felt that the original coup plan—which anticipated a more spontaneous uprising—was inadequate and that the Reserve Army should be used even without Fromm's cooperation.

The original Valkyrie order only dealt with combat readiness of Reserve Army units. Olbricht added a second part, 'Valkyrie II', which provided for the swift mustering of these units into battle groups ready for action.

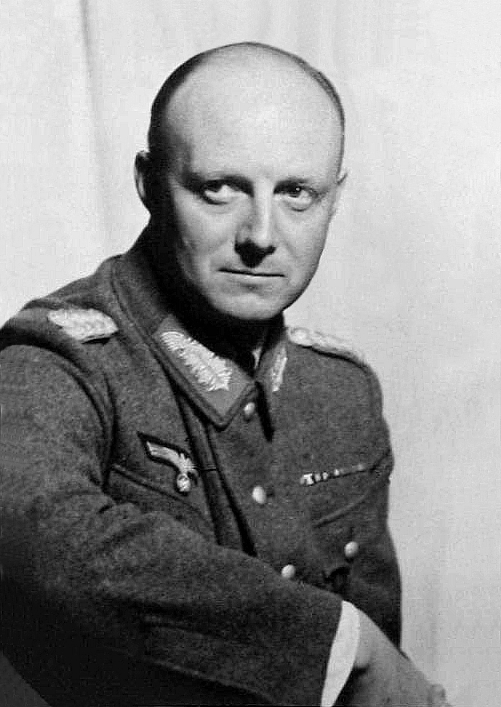
Henning von Tresckow in 1944

In August and September 1943, co-conspirator Major General Henning von Tresckow, finding Olbricht's revision inadequate, greatly expanded the Valkyrie plan by new supplementary orders that undermined the staunchest Nazi institutions by implicating them in Hitler's death. A secretly drafted declaration began with the words: "The Führer Adolf Hitler is dead! A treacherous group of party leaders has attempted to exploit the situation by attacking our embattled soldiers from the rear to seize power for themselves."

With this premise securing the credible motivation for the Reserve Army to seize control of the organs of state, detailed instructions were written for the occupation of government ministries in Berlin, of Himmler's headquarters in East Prussia, of radio stations, of telephone exchanges, of other Nazi infrastructure through military districts and of concentration camps. (Previously, it was believed that Colonel Claus Schenk von Stauffenberg was mainly responsible for the Valkyrie plan, but documents recovered by the Soviet Union after the war and released in 2007 suggest that a detailed plan was developed by Tresckow in autumn 1943.) All documents were handled by Tresckow's wife, Erika, and by Margarete von Oven, his secretary. Both women wore gloves so as to leave no fingerprints.

In essence, the coup plan involved tricking the Reserve Army into the seizure and removal of the civilian government and paramilitary organizations of wartime Germany under the false pretence that the SS had attempted a coup and assassinated Hitler. The conspirators depended on the assumption that the rank-and-file soldiers and junior officers designated to execute Operation Valkyrie would be motivated to do so on the basis of their false belief that the Nazi civilian leadership had behaved with disloyalty and treason against the state and the leader to whom the army has sworn allegiance, and were therefore required to be removed. The conspirators counted on the soldiers to obey their orders so long as they came from a legitimate channel—namely, the Reserve Army High Command—in the emergency situation following Hitler's putative death.

Apart from Hitler, only Colonel-General Friedrich Fromm, as commander of the Reserve Army, could activate Operation Valkyrie. For the planned coup to succeed, therefore, the plotters had either to win Fromm over to the conspiracy or to neutralize him in some way. Fromm, like many senior officers, knew about the military conspiracies against Hitler in general terms, but neither supported them nor reported them to the Gestapo.

The orders, which on July 20 were transmitted but never fully implemented, illustrate the scope and detail of the planning, as well as the dual military and political aims: The disarming of the SS and the SD, as well as the reorientation of governmental and military actions away from what the conspirators considered to be the lawlessness of the Nazi regime.

=== Initial order to the Wehrkreise (Military Districts) ===
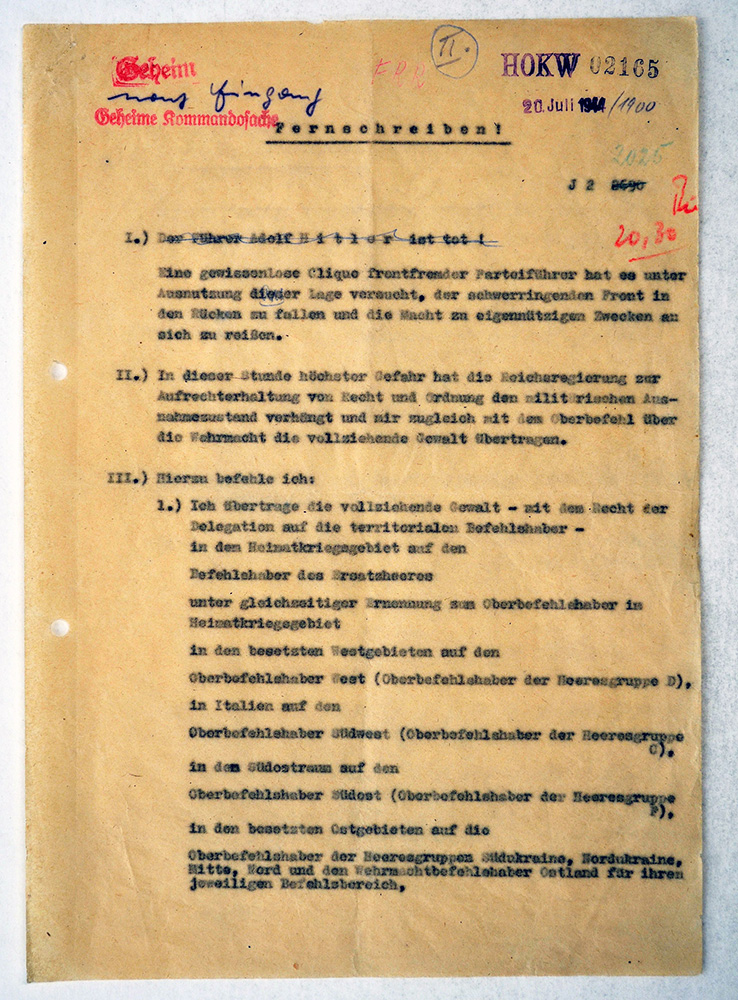
Operation Valkyrie Telex declaring Hitler's death

The Führer Adolf Hitler is dead!

I. An unscrupulous clique of party leaders without frontline service have exploited this situation to stab the fighting front in the back and to seize power for their own selfish ends.

II. In order to maintain law and order in this situation of acute danger the Reich Government has declared a state of martial law and has transferred the executive power to me together with the supreme command of the Wehrmacht.

III. I hereby command:

1. I transfer executive power with the right of delegation to the territorial commanders, in the home territory to the Commander of the Reserve Army, while simultaneously appointing him Supreme Commander in the home territory - in the occupied western territories to the Commander-in-Chief West - in Italy to the Commander-in-Chief Southwest - in the occupied eastern territories to the commanders-in-chief of the army groups and the Wehrmacht commander Ostland for their respective areas of command - in Denmark and Norway to the Wehrmacht commanders.

2. The following are subordinated to the holders of executive power:

a) All Wehrmacht offices and units in their area of command, including the Waffen SS, the RAD, and the OT.
b) All public authorities (of the Reich, the states, and local government), in particular the entire order police, security police, and administrative police.
c) All officials and formations of the NSDAP and its associated leagues.
d) The public transportation services and public utilities.

3. The whole of the Waffen SS is to be integrated in the army with immediate effect.

4. The holders of executive power are responsible for the maintenance of law and order. They are to ensure in particular:

a) The security of the communications networks.
b) The neutralization of the SD.

Any resistance against the military authorities is to be ruthlessly suppressed. In this hour of the greatest peril for the Fatherland the unity of the Wehrmacht and the maintenance of discipline is the most important requirement. I therefore make it the duty of all army, navy, and air force commanders to support the holders of executive power with all means at their disposal and to ensure that their directives are obeyed by the agencies subordinate to them.

The German soldier is faced with an historic task. It will depend on his energy and behavior whether or not Germany will be saved.

The same [task?] have all territorial commanders, the supreme commanders of the sections of the Wehrmacht and the subordinate commanders of the army, navy and air force.

The Commander-in-Chief of the Wehrmacht

Field Marshal von Witzleben

— Telex Message by the Conspiratorial Stauffenberg Group to the Holders of Executive Power (July 20, 1944)

=== Order to General Government of Poland ===
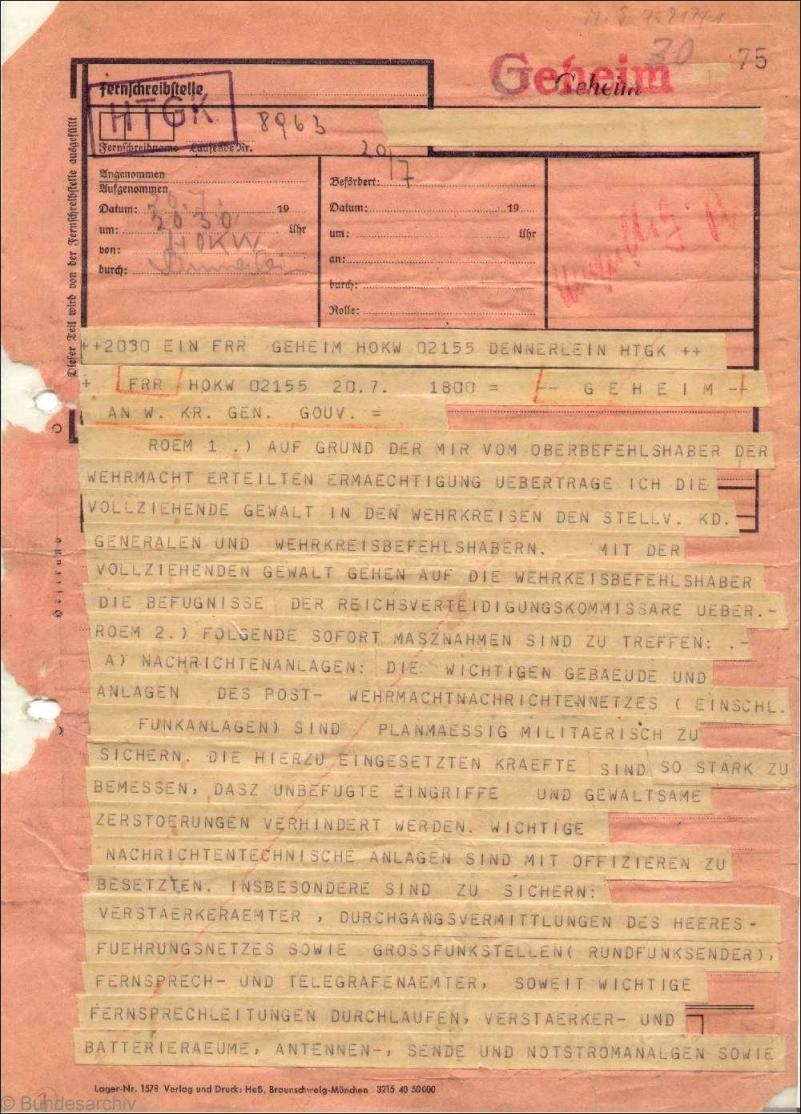
Operation Valkyrie Telex from Col. Stauffenberg to General Government in Poland, page 1 of 3

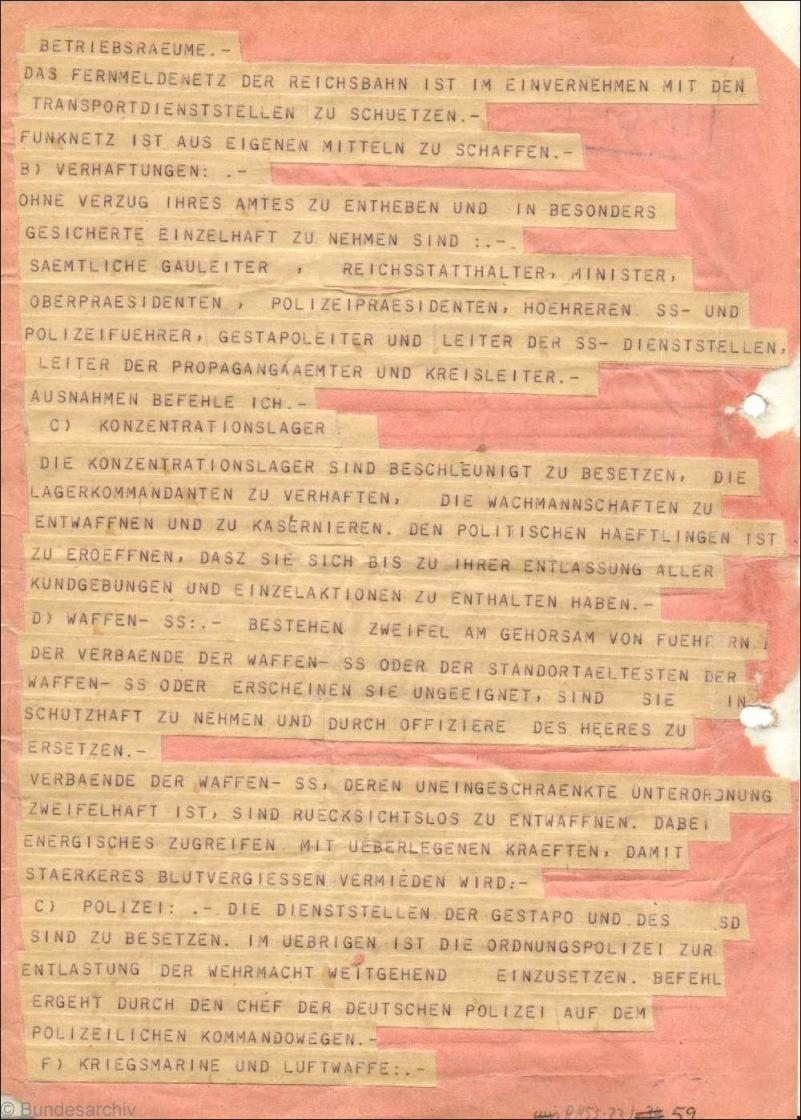
Operation Valkyrie Telex from Col. Stauffenberg to General Government in Poland, page 2 of 3

Particularly notable for its apparent anticipation of the release of "political prisoners" from concentration camps in the General Government of occupied Poland, this telex is preserved in the Bundesarchiv. See source matter.

8:30 p.m. FRR Secret HOKW 02155 Dennerlein HTGK

FRR HOKW 02155 on 20.7, 1800 - Secret – To Military District General Gouvernement –

I. Due to authorization given to me by the supreme commander of the German Armed Forces [Wehrmacht], I hereby transfer the consummate authority to the defense structures and the deputy Commanding Generals and defense structure commanders. With this consummate authority, the powers of the Reich defense commissars is transferred to the commanders of the Military Districts.

II. The following measures must immediately be implemented:

A) Communication Systems: Important buildings and systems of the postal- army communications networks (including radio installations) should be taken militarily according to plan.

Forces used for these take-overs should be strong enough to ensure that unauthorized encroachments and forceful destruction can be prevented.
Important technical communication installations are to be occupied by officers.
Most important objects of attention: repeater stations, telegraph exchanges of the military command, as well as larger radio stations (broadcasting stations), telephone and telegraph offices, in as much as important telephone lines pass through these offices, repeater and battery rooms, antennas, transmitters and emergency power systems as well as mechanical rooms.
The telecommunication network of the Reichsbahn is to be protected under agreement with local transportation offices.
Radio networks should be created from internal resources.

B) Arrests:

Without delay the following persons are to be relieved of duty and secured in solitary confinement:
All Gauleiter, Reichsstatthalter, Ministers, Oberpräsidenten, Police Commissioners, Higher SS and Police Leaders, Gestapo leaders and leaders of SS–Departments, Leaders of the Propaganda Offices and District leaders.

I hereby order the following exceptional cases –

C) Concentration Camps:

The concentration camps should be occupied with accelerated speed.
The camp commanders should be arrested, guard personnel should be disarmed and sent to their barracks.
Political prisoners should be told that they should refrain from demonstrations and individual activities until their release.

D) Waffen-SS:

If there be any doubt as to their obedience to their leaders, the organization of the Waffen-SS, or to their local commander; or if these appear to be unsuitable; they are to be taken into protective custody and replaced with army officers.
Organizations of the Waffen-SS whose absolute subordination is in doubt should be heedlessly disarmed. Energetic action with superior forces is recommended in order to avoid greater bloodshed.

C) [E] Police:

The offices of the Gestapo and the SD are to be occupied.
Furthermore, the Ordnungspolizei is to be widely used to relieve the military [Wehrmacht].
Orders will be enacted by the Chief of German Police through police command structures.

F) Navy and Air Force:

In contract between commanders of the Navy and of the Air Force, joint actions must be ensured.

III. To address all political questions resulting from the military state of emergency, I appoint a political commissioner to every military district commander. This [commissioner] will take over the tasks of the administration chief. Until further notice, he will advise the military district commander on all political questions.

IV. The Homeland Command (home command staff) shall serve as the processing office of the Supreme Commander (Commander in Chief) in the wartime homeland as concerns all matters of executive authority. He shall send a liaison officer to the district commanders for the purpose of reciprocal status and objective briefings.

V. In the exercise of executive power, no arbitrary acts of revenge will be tolerated. The population must be [made] aware of [our] distance from the arbitrary methods of the previous rulers.

Signed,

COMMANDER IN HOME WAR AREA NO. 32 160/44
GEZ. FROMM COL. GENERAL.
GEZ. COUNT STAUFFENBERG.
FOR CORRECTNESS GEZ. V. MERTZ COL. DG

== Execution ==
The key role in its actual implementation was to be played by Colonel Claus Schenk Graf von Stauffenberg, after his assassination attempt on Hitler on 20 July 1944. Stauffenberg had also further improved the Valkyrie plan and made changes to address changing situations.

Stauffenberg's position as Chief of Staff of the Reserve Army gave him access to Hitler for reports and at the same time required his presence at headquarters for implementation of Valkyrie. At first, Tresckow and Stauffenberg sought out other officers with access to Hitler who could carry out the assassination.

General Helmuth Stieff, Chief of Organization in Army High Command, volunteered to be the assassin but later backed down. Tresckow attempted several times to be assigned to Hitler's headquarters without success. Finally, Stauffenberg decided to carry out both the assassination attempt and the Valkyrie operation, which greatly reduced the chance of success. After two abortive attempts, Stauffenberg placed the bomb on 20 July and hurried back to Berlin to assume his pivotal role.

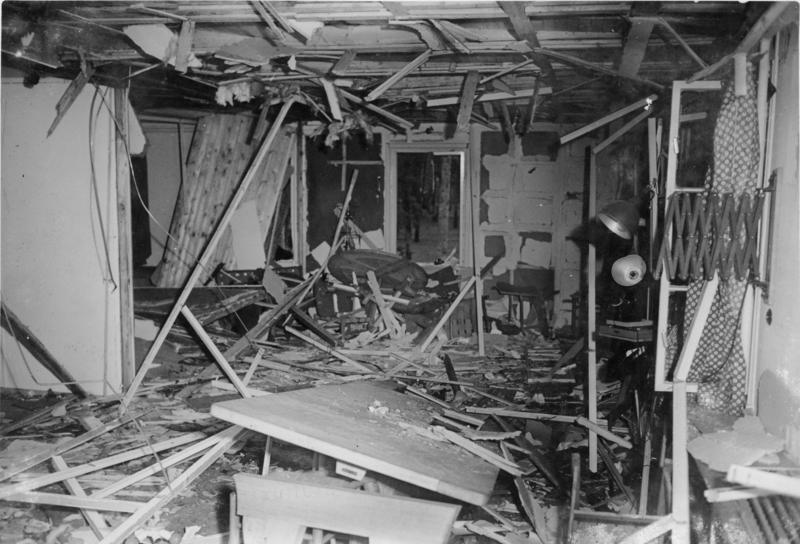
The Wolfsschanze after the bomb explosion

Discovering from Field Marshal Wilhelm Keitel that the bomb had not killed Hitler, Fromm refused to initiate Valkyrie, only to learn that General Friedrich Olbricht had initiated in his name; refusing to co-operate, he was removed and arrested by the conspirators and replaced by General Erich Hoepner. Meanwhile, Carl-Heinrich von Stülpnagel, military governor of occupied France, managed to disarm the SD and SS, and captured most of their leadership. He travelled to Günther von Kluge's headquarters and asked him to contact the Allies, only to be informed that Hitler was alive.

By this time Reichsführer-SS Heinrich Himmler had taken charge of the situation and had issued orders countermanding Olbricht's mobilisation of Operation Valkyrie. This led to the failure of the coup, with most of the commanding officers learning that Hitler was alive and cancelling their operations.

When it was clear that the coup had failed, the less resolute members of the conspiracy in Berlin began to change sides. Fromm was freed from his detention room and, after a brief fight, he managed to regain control of the Bendlerblock. In a desperate attempt to cover his involvement, he ordered the executions of General Friedrich Olbricht, his chief of staff Colonel Albrecht Mertz von Quirnheim, Colonel Claus von Stauffenberg and his adjutant Lieutenant Werner von Haeften. Shortly after midnight, the condemned men were led to a mound of earth back-lit by idling vehicles where each was executed by firing squad in the courtyard of Bendlerstraße headquarters. (The street has since been renamed Stauffenbergstraße in honour of Colonel Stauffenberg.) Further executions were forbidden following the arrival of Waffen-SS personnel under the command of Obersturmbannfüher Otto Skorzeny.

== See also ==
- Assassination attempts on Adolf Hitler
- List of members of the 20 July plot
- Fighter Pilots' Revolt incident

== Bibliography ==
=== English ===
- von Boeselager, Philipp Freiherr (2009). Valkyrie: The Plot to Kill Hitler. Translated by Steven Rendall, Phoenix. Weidenfeld and Nicolson. ISBN 978-0-75382-566-2.
- Fest, Joachim C. (1996). Plotting Hitler's Death: The German Resistance to Hitler, 1933–1945. Macmillan. ISBN 0-8050-5648-3.
- Gisevius, Hans Bernd (2009). Valkyrie: An Insider's Account of the Plot to Kill Hitler |2009 reprint of one volume abridgement of two volume text, To the Bitter End, 1947. Foreword by Allen Welsh Dulles, introduction by Peter Hoffmann (translated by Richard and Clara Winston). Cambridge, MA: Da Capo Press. ISBN 978-0-30681-771-7.
- Hoffman, Peter (1988). German Resistance to Hitler. Harvard University Press. ISBN 978-0674350861.
- Jones, Nigel (2008). Countdown to Valkyrie: The July Plot to Assassinate Hitler. Frontline. ISBN 978-1-84832-508-1.
- Orbach, Danny (2016). The Plots Against Hitler. Houghton Mifflin Harcourt. ISBN 978-0544714434.
- Kurtz, H. (1946). "The July Plot". The Course of German History. By Taylor, A. J. P. Abingdon, Oxfordshire: Methuen Publishing. ISBN 978-1-13452-196-8.

=== German ===
- Hoffmann, Peter (1985). Widerstand, Staatsstreich, Attentat. Der Kampf der Opposition gegen Hitler ((reissue) ed.). Munich: Montserrat.
- Jacobsen, Hans-Adolf (Hrsg.) (1984). Spiegelbild einer Verschwörung. Die Opposition gegen Hitler und der Staatsstreich vom 20. Juli 1944 in der SD-Berichterstattung. Geheime Dokumente aus dem ehemaligen Reichssicherheitshauptamt. Vol. 2. Stuttgart.
- Page, Helena (1993). General Friedrich Olbricht: Ein Mann des 20. Julis. Bonn: Bouvier Verlag. ISBN 3-416-02514-8.
- Rüthers, Bernd (2005). Spiegelbild einer Verschwörung – Zwei Abschiedsbriefe zum 20 July 1944. Juristenzeitung 14. pp. 689–698.
- Ueberschär, Gerd Rolf (2004). "Auf dem Weg zum 20. Juli 1944, Motive und Entwicklung der Militäropposition gegen Hitler". From Politics and Contemporary History (APuZ) (in German). B 27. Juristenzeitung 14: 689–698.
