= Kronberg im Taunus =

- Town
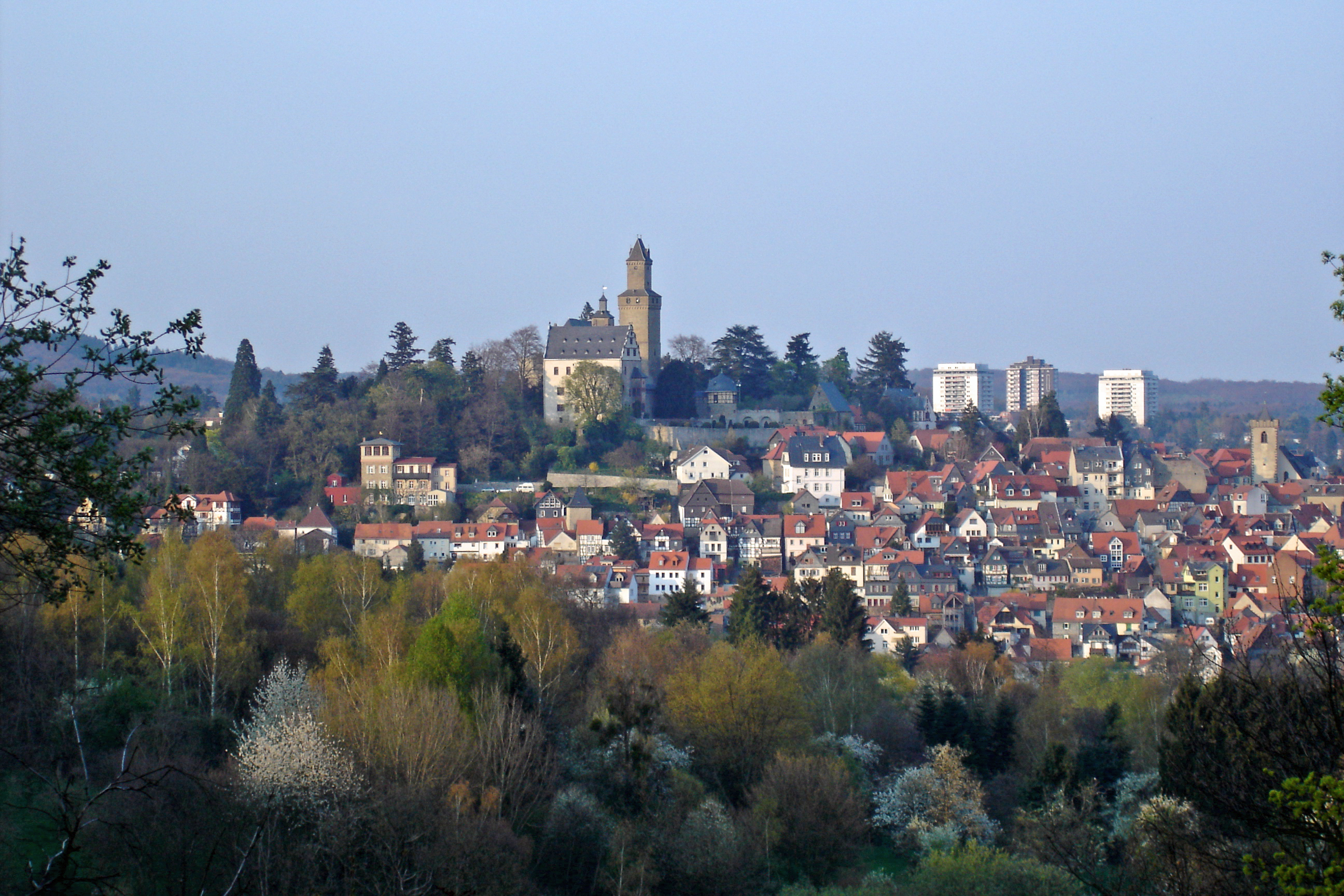
- Old Town of Kronberg with the Kronberg Castle

- Flag Coat of arms

- Location of Kronberg im Taunus within Hochtaunuskreis district
- Interactive map of Kronberg im Taunus
- Location within Germany Location within Hesse
- Coordinates: 50°11′N 8°30′E
- Country: Germany
- State: Hesse
- Admin. region: Darmstadt
- District: Hochtaunuskreis

Government
  - Mayor (2020–26): Christoph König (Ind.)

Area
  - Total: 18.58 km^{2} (7.17 sq mi)
- Elevation: 200–400 m (660–1,310 ft)

Population (2025-12-31)
  - Total: 18,577
  - Density: 999.8/km^{2} (2,590/sq mi)
- Time zone: UTC+01:00 (CET)
  - Summer (DST): UTC+02:00 (CEST)
- Postal codes: 61476
- Dialling codes: 06173
- Vehicle registration: HG, USI
- Website: www.kronberg.de

Kronberg im Taunus (German pronunciation: [ˈkʁoːnˌbɛʁk ʔɪm ˈtaʊnʊs], lit. 'Kronberg in the Taunus') is a town in the Hochtaunuskreis district, Hesse, Germany and part of the Frankfurt Rhein-Main urban area. Before 1866, it was in the Duchy of Nassau; in that year the whole Duchy was absorbed into Prussia. Kronberg lies at the foot of the Taunus, flanked in the north and southwest by forests. A mineral water spring also rises in the town.

== Geography ==
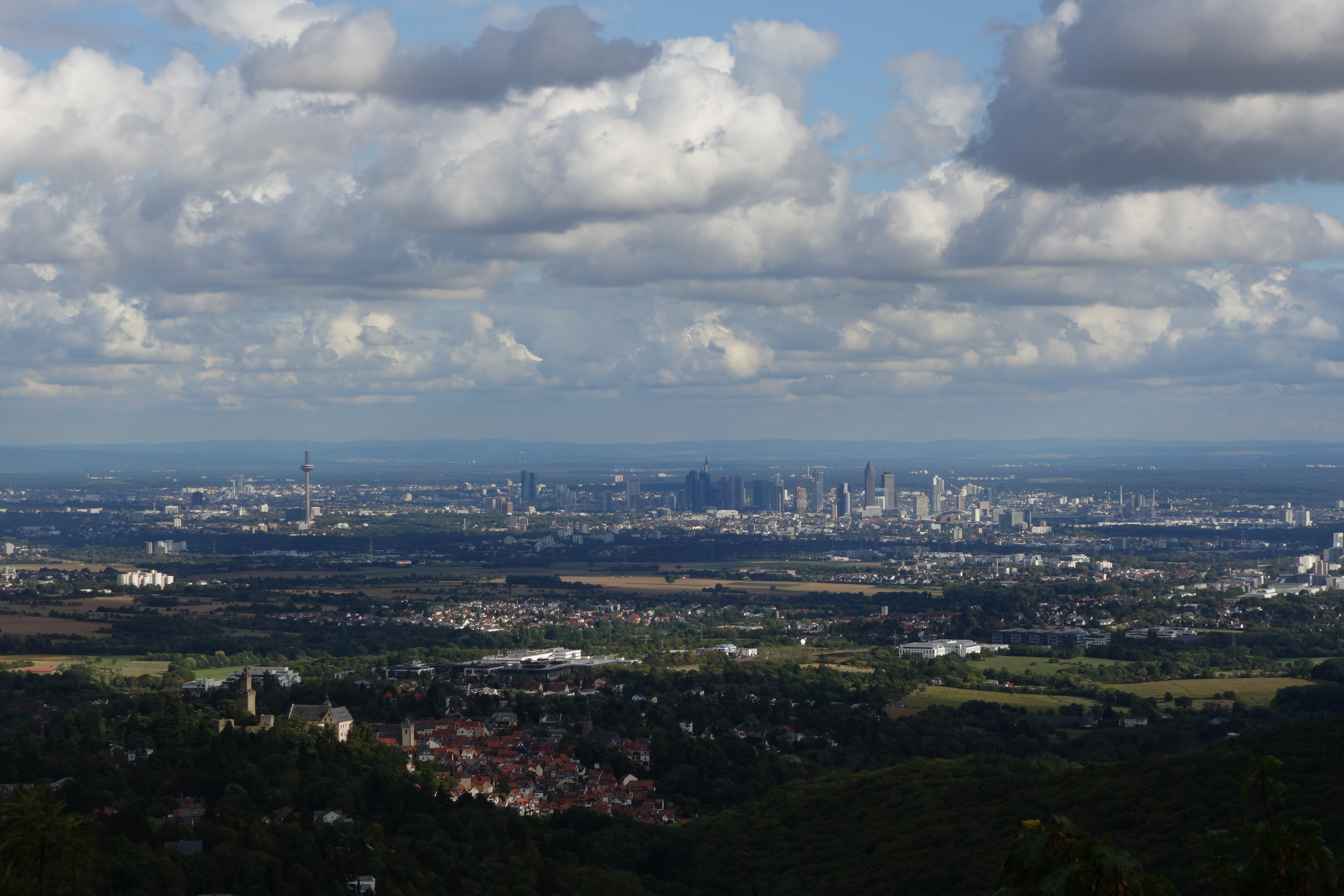
Kronberg as seen from Falkenstein Castle; above Steinbach (left) and Eschborn, in the background Frankfurt

=== Neighbouring communities ===
Kronberg borders in the north and east on the town of Oberursel, in the southeast on the town of Steinbach, in the south on the towns of Eschborn and Schwalbach (both in Main-Taunus-Kreis), and in the west on the town of Königstein.

=== Constituent communities ===
Kronberg consists of the three centres of Kronberg (8,108 inhabitants), Oberhöchstadt (6,363 inhabitants) and Schönberg (3,761 inhabitants).

== History ==
=== 1220-1704 ===
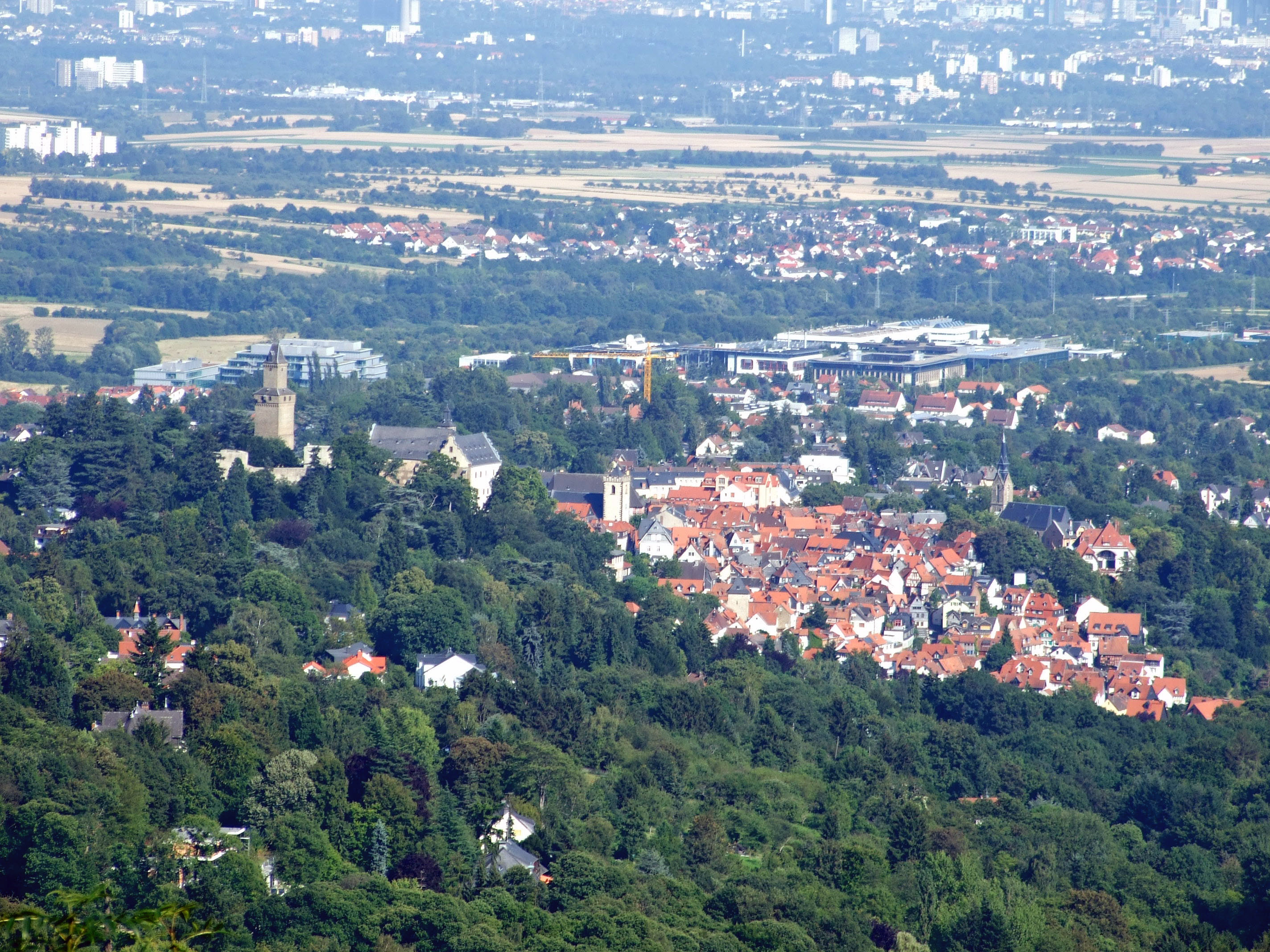
View from Falkenstein castle

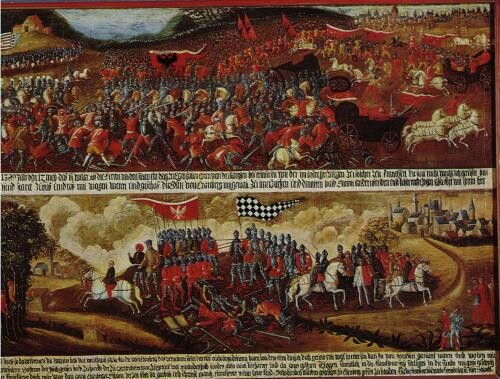
Battle of Eschborn, 1389 (Historical museum, Frankfurt)

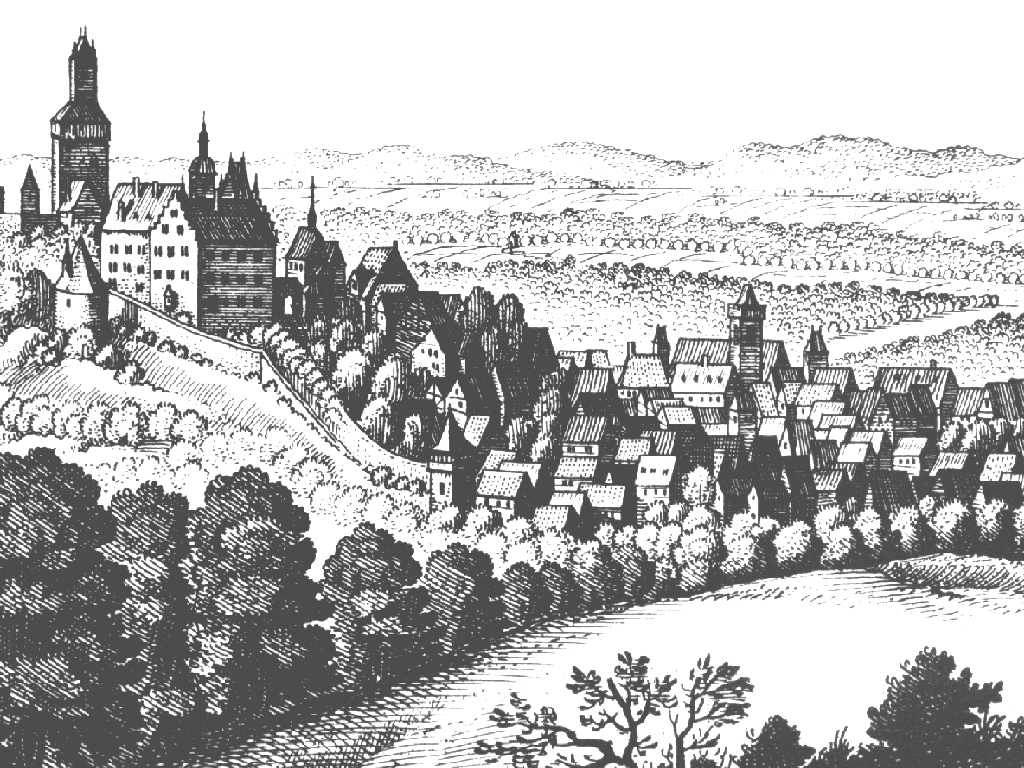
Merian-Stich Cronberg in 1655

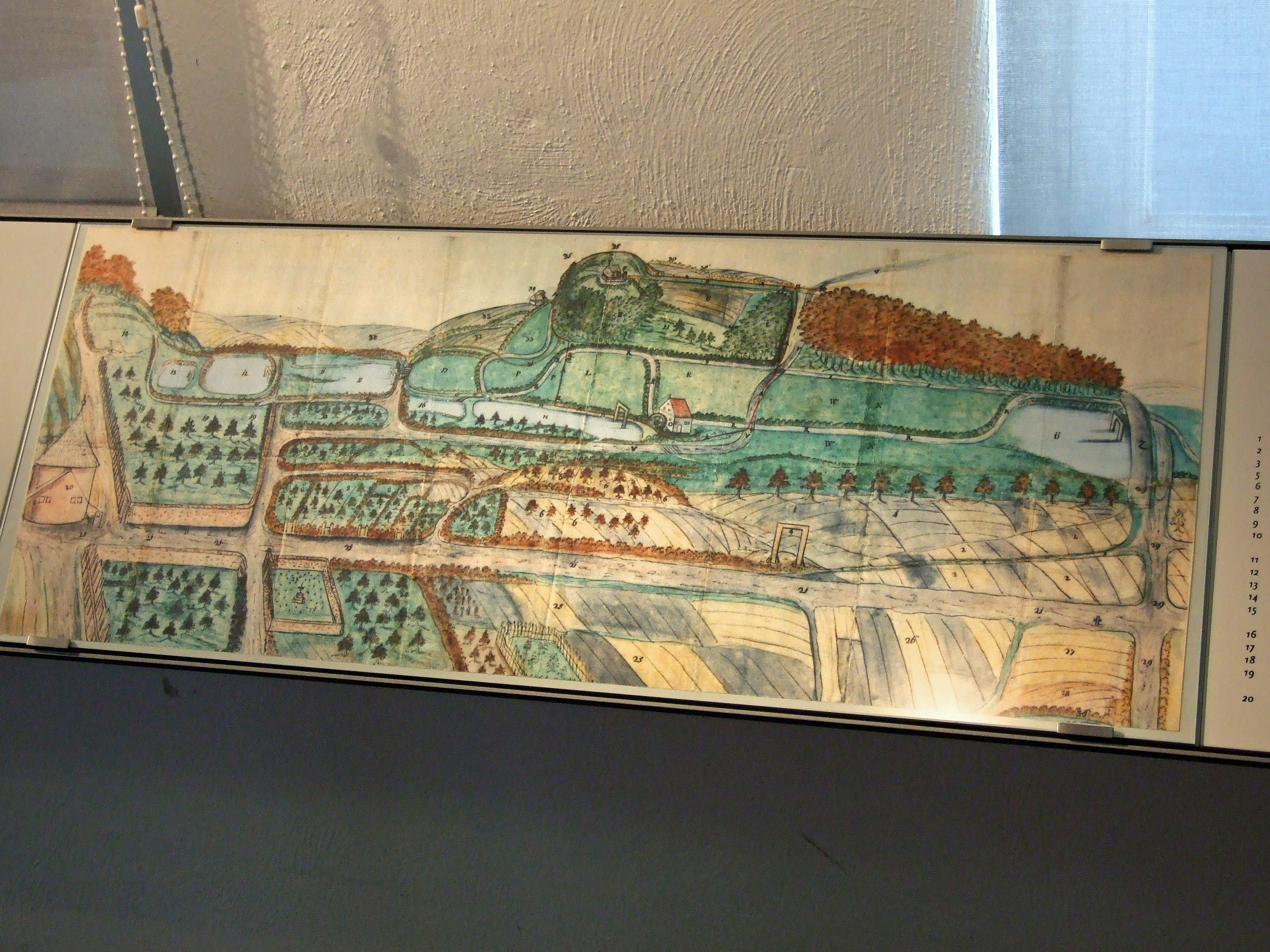
Kronberg, circa 1700

When Kronberg Castle was built (about 1220) it was shared by the Knights of Askenburne (Eschborn), who owned a towered castle there. The Kronenstamm (stamm = stem) moved to Kronberg, giving themselves that name at the time, while the Flügelstamm ("wing stem") followed them there only 30 years later.

Town rights were granted to the small settlement on 25 April 1330 by Louis IV, Holy Roman Emperor. As of 1367, the town also had market rights as well as Blutgerichtsbarkeit (meaning that there was an Imperial court authorized to mete out bodily punishment, including death), granted by Charles IV, Holy Roman Emperor. Together with those from Hattstein Castle and Reifenberg Castle, the Knights of Kronberg entered into a feud with Frankfurt in 1389. When on 13 May a great force from Frankfurt swept to Kronberg Castle, Hanau (Ulrich von Hanau) and the Electorate of the Palatinate (150 of Ruprecht von der Pfalz's cuirassiers) troops rushed to help those being beset, driving the Frankfurt forces off on 14 May in the Battle of Eschborn and taking about 620 prisoners, including leading city officials, a few noble council members and all the town's bakers, butchers, locksmiths and shoemakers.

The story is told in Kronberg that during the battle one of the knights of Kronberg was unhorsed, and because he lacked a replacement mount, he returned to battle on a donkey. Legend has it that it was the unearthly noise the donkey made in battle that made the Frankfurt army run, and this gave birth to the third "Stem", the Ohrenstam (Earstem) - with a pair of donkeys ears on its coat of arms.

Only the huge ransom of 73,000 golden guilders – negotiated on 22 August, the pain of which Frankfurt would feel for 120 years – ended the fight with Frankfurt and laid the groundwork for the Frankfurter Landwehr fortifications. Peace was, however, quickly concluded (1391) and alliance sought with Kronberg. In 1394, the council appointed Hartmuth von Cronberg to a two-year term as Bailiff of Bonames, and in 1395, Johann von Cronberg concluded a detailed treaty of federation with Frankfurt, which the Kronbergers bound the Frankfurters and their masses to protect. Finally, in 1398, the "Schießgesellen zu Cronenberg" ("Journeymen shooters of Kronberg") invited the "Schießgesellen zue Franckenfurd unsern guten frunden" ("Journeymen shooters of Frankfurt, our good friends") to a "Schießen umb eyn Cleynod" ("shoot for a treasure"). The letter bearing this message is said to be Germany's oldest surviving invitation to a shooting event (this refers to early weapons, since firearms were as yet unknown).

Since Hartmut XII of Kronberg, who is said to be the town's Reformer, had earlier stood by his cousin Franz von Sickingen in his attack on Trier and Worms, Archbishop Richard von Greiffenklau zu Vollrads of Trier, Ludwig V of the Electorate of the Palatinate and Philip I, Landgrave of Hesse attacked the town and the castle at Kronberg in 1522 and forced an unconditional surrender. Hartmut fled, and Philip introduced the Reformation throughout Hesse. However, since Kronberg was an Imperial fief, Philip had to give the castle and town back to Hartmut in 1541 under the issuing of property rights for the Lutheran Church. These rights were affirmed by Hesse-Darmstadt in the 17th and 18th centuries, ensuring that Mainz's later attempts at a Counterreformation (1626-1649) and the Simultanisierung (1737-1768) would never enjoy success.

In 1704, the last member of the ruling family, Herr Johann Niclas von und zu Cronberg, died childless at Hohlenfels Castle in Mudershausen. Kronberg, along with the communities of Schönberg, Niederhöchstadt and Eschborn therefore passed to the Electorate of Mainz.

=== 1704-1866 ===
It was under Mainz's rule that the nowadays so-called "Dispute Church" ("Streitkirche") was built, having been planned as a Catholic church in 1758 to be built right next to the Evangelical church. This led to great protests by the town's Evangelical majority, whose plight reached the Eternal Imperial Diet (Immerwährender Reichstag) in Regensburg, where the Evangelicals were granted their wish, and although the building was built anyway, it was never consecrated as a church. Since 1768, the building has had served secular purposes. It housed a pharmacy, was subsequently used as a guesthouse, and was later repurposed as the Kronberg Painters' Colony's museum.

In the Treaty of Lunéville in 1801, the Electorate of Mainz lost its worldly territory, including the Imperial fief of Kronberg, which was confiscated by the Prince of Nassau-Usingen in 1802, and formally awarded to him in 1803. In the Austro-Prussian War of 1866, the Duke of Nassau sided with Austria, thereby losing his land to Prussia.

=== 1866-1945 ===
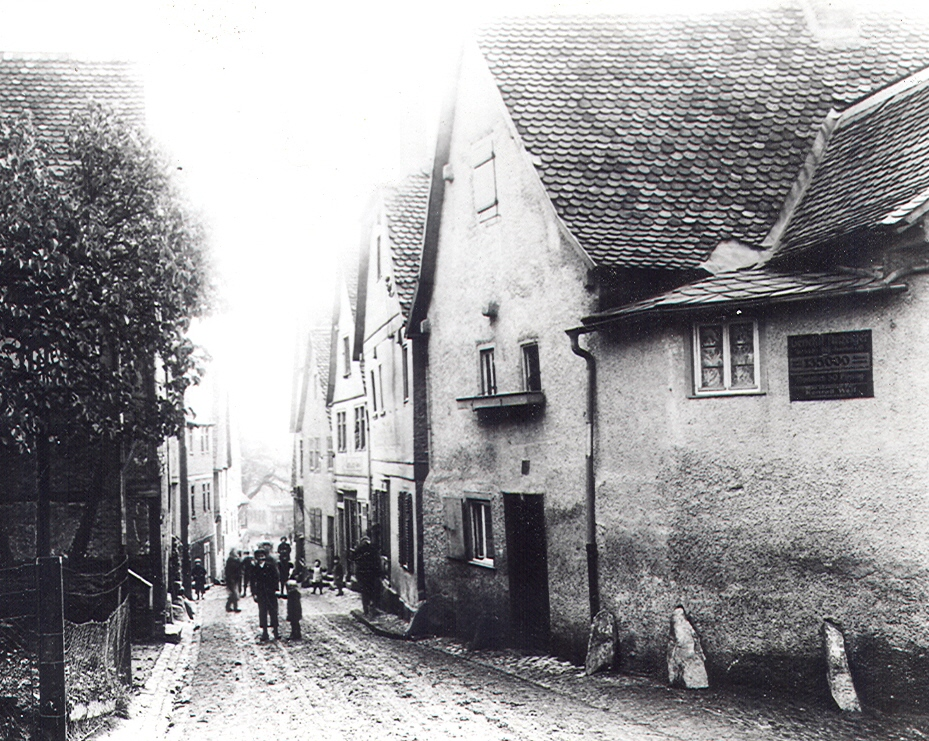
Kronberg circa 1900

Wealthy industrialists, traders and bankers discovered the little Taunus town's idyllic and climatically advantageous setting right near Frankfurt in the middle of the 19th century and built villas and summer homes in Kronberg and Schönberg. Even artists, among them Anton Burger and Jakob Fürchtegott Dielmann, came to Kronberg and founded the Kronberg Painters' Colony, which lasted into the 20th century. The small town experienced an upswing with the construction of the Kronberg-Rödelheim railway in 1874.

Schloss Friedrichshof was constructed between 1889 and 1894 as the residence of Empress Victoria Friedrich.

=== Since 1945 ===
After the Second World War, Kronberg belonged to Gross-Hessen ("Greater Hesse" – a provisional name for the state that was later dropped), and remains in Hesse today.

In 1946, the Papal Mission for Displaced Persons in Germany was moved to Kronberg by Pope Pius XII. The apostolic visitor and leader of the institution was the Bishop of Fargo, North Dakota, USA Aloisius Muench, who was of German heritage. His spiritual guidance mandate included caring for those who had fled or been driven out of Eastern Europe. Until the summer of 1949, he organized from Kronberg the transport of about 950 goods wagons full of Papal aid supplies to Germany. He was also supported by the US Government; before taking his position in Kronberg, he received from US Secretary of War Robert P. Patterson the document of appointment as liaison commissioner for religious affairs to the US military government in Germany. Through his contacts in the USA Muench arranged a formidable flow of donations into destruction-stricken Germany. After the Federal Republic of Germany was founded, the Kronberg Apostolic Mission was dissolved in 1951. Muench afterwards became the first Apostolic Nuncio in the Federal Republic of Germany (West Germany). In 1959, Pope John XXIII made Archbishop Muench a Cardinal.

Since 28 June 1966, Kronberg has been a state-recognized spa town.

As part of Hesse's municipal reforms, on 1 April 1972, Kronberg merged with the formerly independent communities of Oberhöchstadt and Schönberg.

== Main sights ==
- Old Town with Kronberg Castle, or Burg Kronberg, with its keep, which is the town's oldest building
- the Schloss Friedrichshof (a stately home built as a widow's residence for "Empress Frederick" and now home to the Schlosshotel Kronberg)
- the Recepturhof, Mainz Electorate's administration building
- the town park
- Saint John's Protestant Church (Kirche St. Johann, 1440)
- the "Streitkirche" ("Dispute Church", 1758)
- "Hellhof", a noble seat built by the Kronberg Knights (first mentioned in 1424), nowadays partially converted into a gallery.
- Opelzoo, a medium-sized animal park between Kronberg and Königstein. The Opelzoo originally came into being from Opel Works founder Georg von Opel's grandson's private animal reserve. About 1956, the younger Opel brought a pair of endangered Persian fallow deer to Kronberg and through breeding ensured their survival.

=== Museums and galleries ===
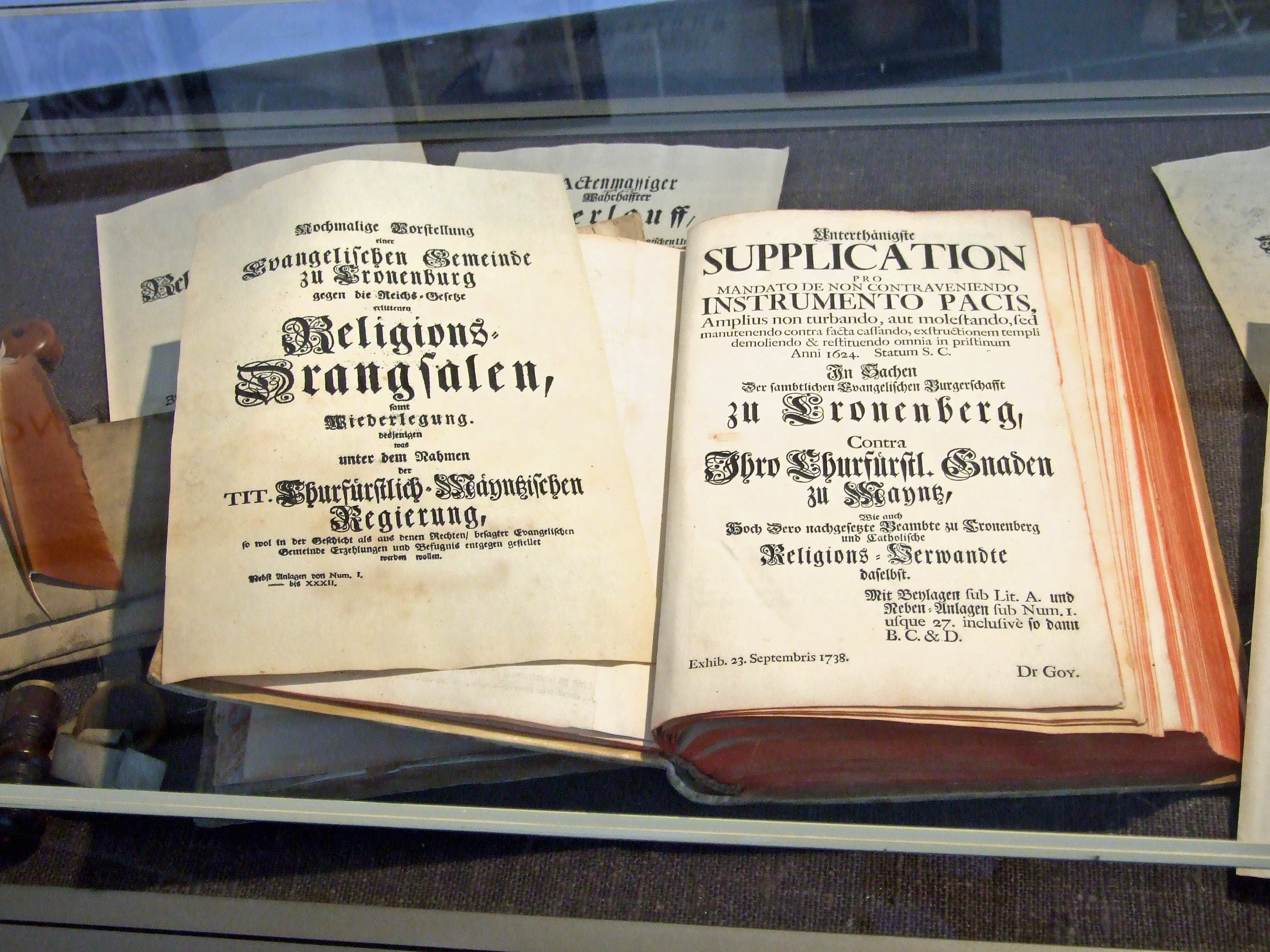
Petition from the Protestant Community, 1738, (Streitkirche)

- Museum at Kronberg Castle
- Kronberg Painters' Colony Museum at the Streitkirche
- Fritz-Best-Museum (closed)
- Braun Collection
- Galerie Opper at the Streitkirche
- Galerie Hellhof
- Galerie Hana
- Galerie Sties
- Galerie Satyra
- ArtXchange

== Politics ==
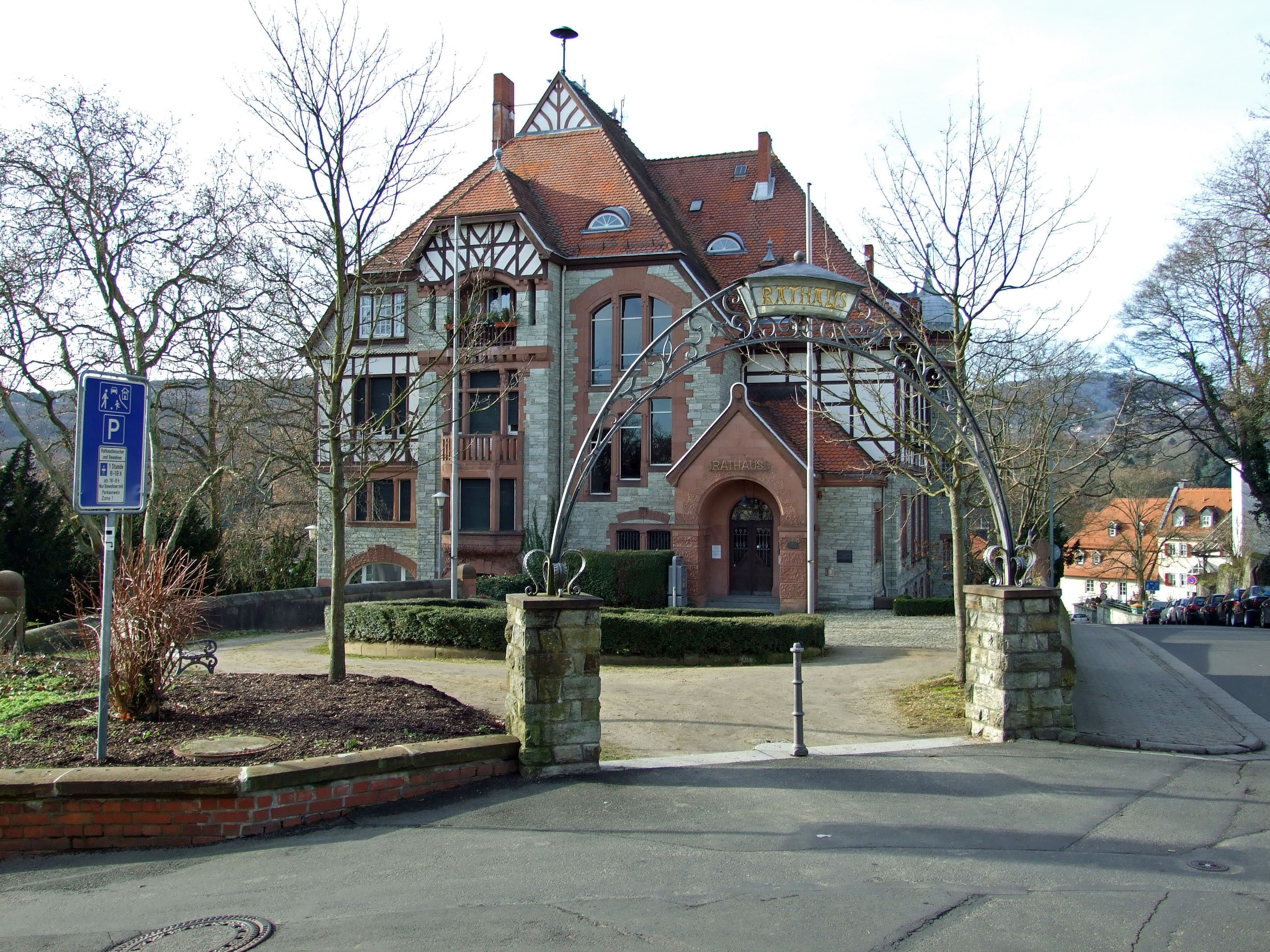
Town Hall

=== Distribution of town council seats ===
The municipal elections on 26 March 2006 yielded the following results:

- CDU - 12 seats
- SPD - 7 seats
- UBG - 4 seats
- KfB - 4 seats
- Greens - 3 seats
- FDP - 2 seats
- Independent - 1 seat

== Culture ==
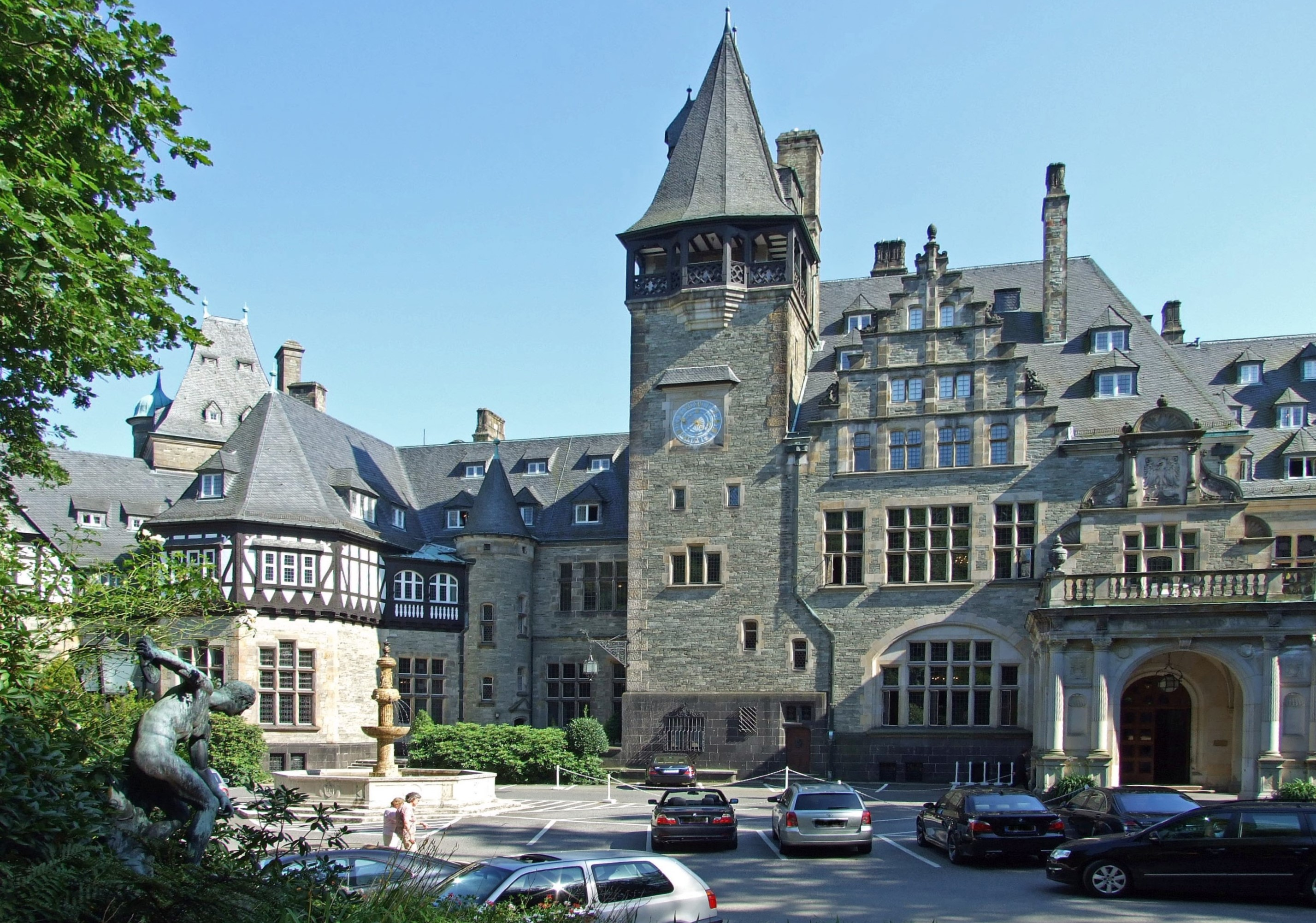
Schlosshotel Kronberg (Schloss Friedrichshof) is nowadays a luxury hotel.

=== Festivals ===
The biggest street festival in the Old Town (around Steinstraße) is the Thäler Kerb. Since 1967, when the Thäler Kerbe club was founded, it has been and is still celebrated, always on Tuesday and Wednesday after the first Sunday in July (although in 2006, it was postponed until 11–12 July owing to the World Cup). During the two festival days, the Thäler Pärchen – the "king" and "queen" of the festival – Miss Bembel and the Thäler Bürgermeister, rule.

==== Other festivals ====
- Dallesfest in Oberhöchstadt
- Brunnenfest (spring festival) in Schönberg (2nd Saturday in August)
- Oberhöchstädter Kerb
- Kürbis-Festival (Gourd Festival) at Kronberg Castle (October)
- Linsenhoff UNICEF Foundation Schafhof Festival (irregular)

=== Markets ===
- Flea market in the Old Town (first Sunday in July)
- Bilder- und Weinmarkt (Picture and Wine Market; first weekend in August)
- Herbstmarkt ("Autumn Market, federation of independents, 2nd weekend in September)
- Apfelmarkt ("Apple Market"; October)
- Christmas Markets in Kronberg and Oberhöchstadt

=== Music festivals ===
- Internationally known Kronberg Academy Cello Festival

== Transport ==
Kronberg is the terminus of the S-Bahn line S4, successor to the Kronberg Railway, which connects Kronberg with Frankfurt city center, the main train station, and the neighboring city of Eschborn. The S-Bahn is part of the Rhein-Main-Verkehrsverbund.

== Economy and infrastructure ==
Kronberg is home to the national headquarters of a number of international firms, such as Accenture, Braun GmbH (Gillette), Celanese and Fidelity International.

== Education ==
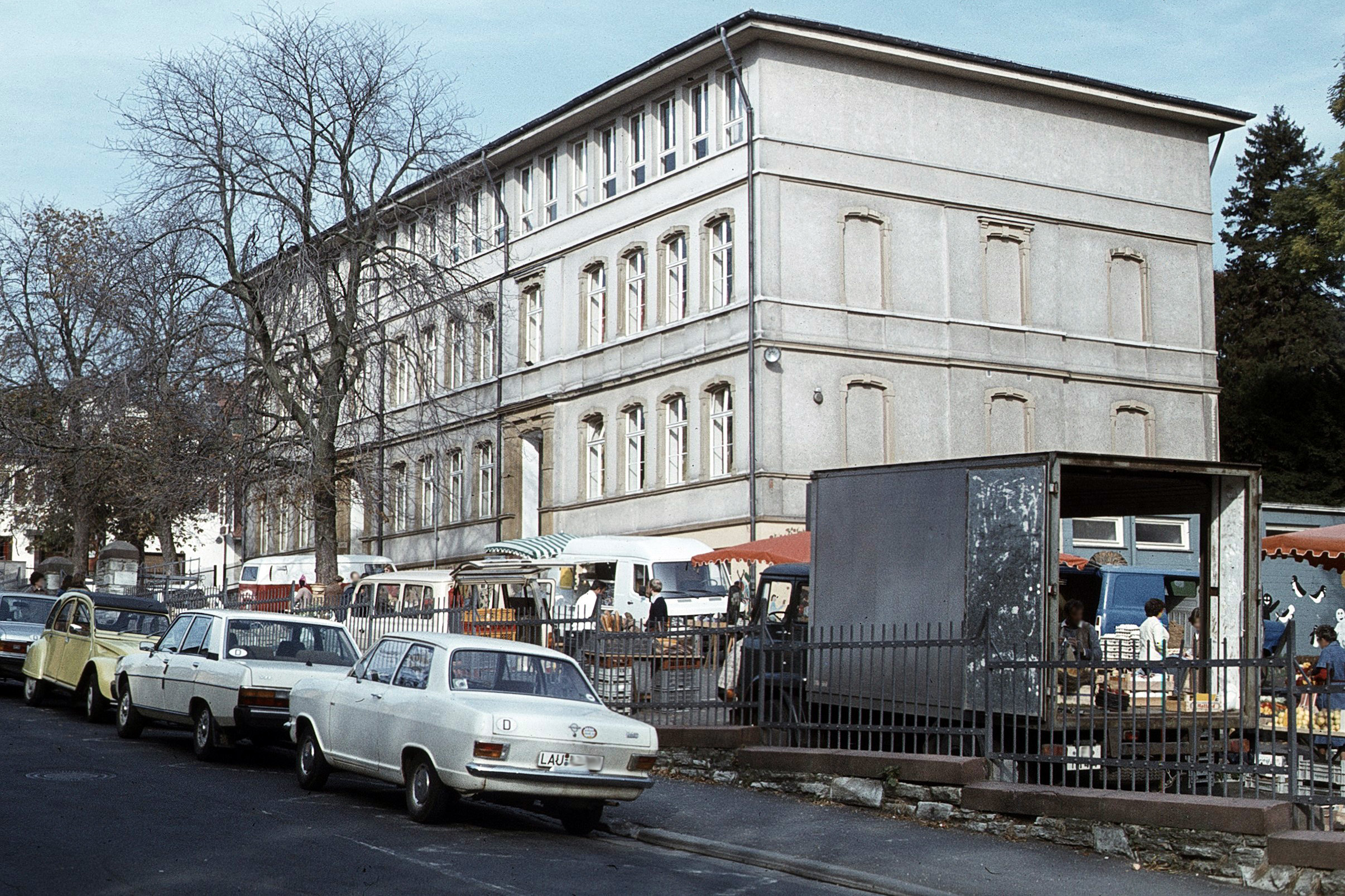
Primary school Kronberg 1979, torn down in the meantime

- Kronthal-Schule (primary school) Kronberg, formerly Grundschule Kronberg, in the former building of the Altkönigschule
- Viktoria-Schule (primary school) Schönberg
- Schöne Aussicht (primary school) Oberhöchstadt
- Altkönigschule (secondary school, comprehensive school with gymnasial upper level) in Kronberg's main town, until 1973/74 in the Villa Winter
- Montessori School (Schönberg)
- Religionspädagogisches Studienzentrum der Evangelischen Kirche in Hessen und Nassau (Schönberg)
- DRK School of Elderly Care (Kronberg)

== Notable people ==
- Eberwin II (died 1308), from 1300 Bishop of Worms
- Johannes von Cronberg (?-?) about 1300, Choir Bishop at Strasbourg
- Walter von Cronberg (1477-1543) High Master of the Teutonic Knights
- Hartmut XII (1488-1549) early companion of Martin Luther, editor of many "Reformational" writings
- Johann Schweikhard von Kronberg (1553–1626) from 1604 Elector and Archbishop at Mainz, builder of the Schloss Johannisburg in Aschaffenburg
- Johann Daniel von Cronberg (circa 1616-1668) member of the "Fruitbearing Society"
- Alwara Höfels (born 1982) German stage and screen actress was born there.

=== Residents ===
- Hermann Abs (1901-1994) German banker
- Josef Ackermann (1948-), Deutsche Bank Chairman of the Board.
- Johann Ludwig Christ (1739-1813) Evangelical clergyman, pomologist
- Jakob Fürchtegott Dielmann (1809-1885) founder of the Kronberg Painters' colony
- Joachim Fest (1926–2006) German historian
- Empress Frederick (1840–1901) Frederick III's widow, Queen Victoria's eldest daughter
- Carl-Hans Graf von Hardenberg (1891-1958) politician and participant in the 20 July Plot, lived from 1945 until his death in 1958 in Kronberg
- Max Horkheimer (1895-1973) lived for a time, until Hitler seized power, on Minnholzweg
- Walther Leisler Kiep (1926-2016) CDU politician
- Ann-Kathrin Linsenhoff (1960-) German dressage rider, founder of the Linsenhoff UNICEF foundation
- Liselott Linsenhoff (1927-1999) German dressage rider, multiple Olympic champion, VDO founder Adolf Schindling's daughter.
- Hans Matthöfer (1925-2009) SPD politician
- Wolfgang Mischnick (1921-2002) FDP politician
- Karl Otto Pöhl (1929-2014) president of the Deutsche Bundesbank 1980-1991
- Fritz Schilgen (1906-2005) last torchbearer in the relay to the Summer Olympics in Berlin in 1936.
- Werner Sollors (1943-), U.S. scholar of English literature and African-American studies

=== Honorary citizens ===
- 1895 Adolf Schreyer (1828–1899)
- 1902 Karl Wilhelm von Meister (1863–1935)
- 1933 Paul von Hindenburg (1847–1934)

== Twin cities ==
- Le Lavandou, France, since September 2, 1972
- Ballenstedt, Germany, since October 6, 1988
- Porto Recanati, Italy, since September 5, 1993
- Aberystwyth, Wales, United Kingdom, since November 1, 1997
- Zaventem, Belgium
- Esquel, Argentina
- Marchena, Spain

Kronberg im Taunus has also a friendship with:

- Guldental, Germany
