= Lloyd Hall (Bremerhaven) =

- Lloydhalle
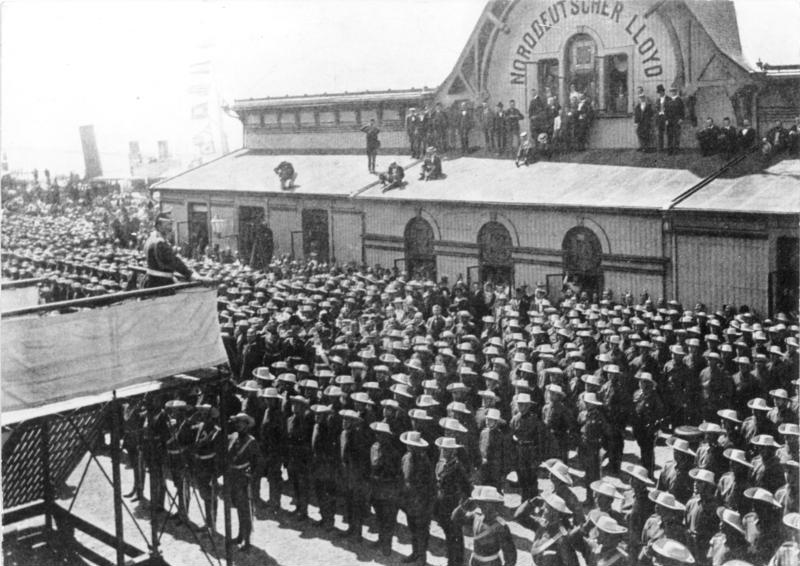
- Wilhelm II during his 1900 speech in front of the Lloyd Hall in Bremerhaven
- Interactive map of the Lloyd Hall area

General information
- Type: Passenger terminal
- Coordinates: 53.5562°N 8.5566°E
- Construction started: 1870
- Renovated: 1897
- Destroyed: 1944
- Client: Norddeutscher Lloyd

Design and construction
- Main contractor: Bernhard Scheller

The Lloyd Hall (German:Lloydhalle) was a maritime passenger terminal in Bremerhaven, at the "Kaiserhafen I" dock, was built in 1870, rebuilt in 1897, and destroyed in 1944 during World War II.

== Background ==
The first Lloydhalle was opened in 1870 when the Norddeutscher Lloyd started operations at the New Port in Bremerhaven.

After 1890, large passenger ships could no longer be accommodated in Bremerhaven, but instead were sent to Nordenham on the opposite side of the Weser river.

With the construction of Kaiserhafen I–III docks from 1872 to 1909 and after the construction of the Kaiser lock in 1897, the then largest express steamers of Norddeutscher Lloyd were able to call at the Bremerhaven ports again. At the same time, the Lloyd Hall was completed at the base of the wharf on the western quay of the Kaiser lock in order to accommodate the increased passenger load.

The second Lloyd Hall was designed and built by the contractor and architect Bernhard Scheller. It had several waiting rooms, a customs and baggage hall and the telegraph station. From the covered platform, the upper cabin classes embarked by boat to the ship, which was otherwise ready to depart. Most of the emigrants on the "between deck" had already boarded at Kaiserhafen III.

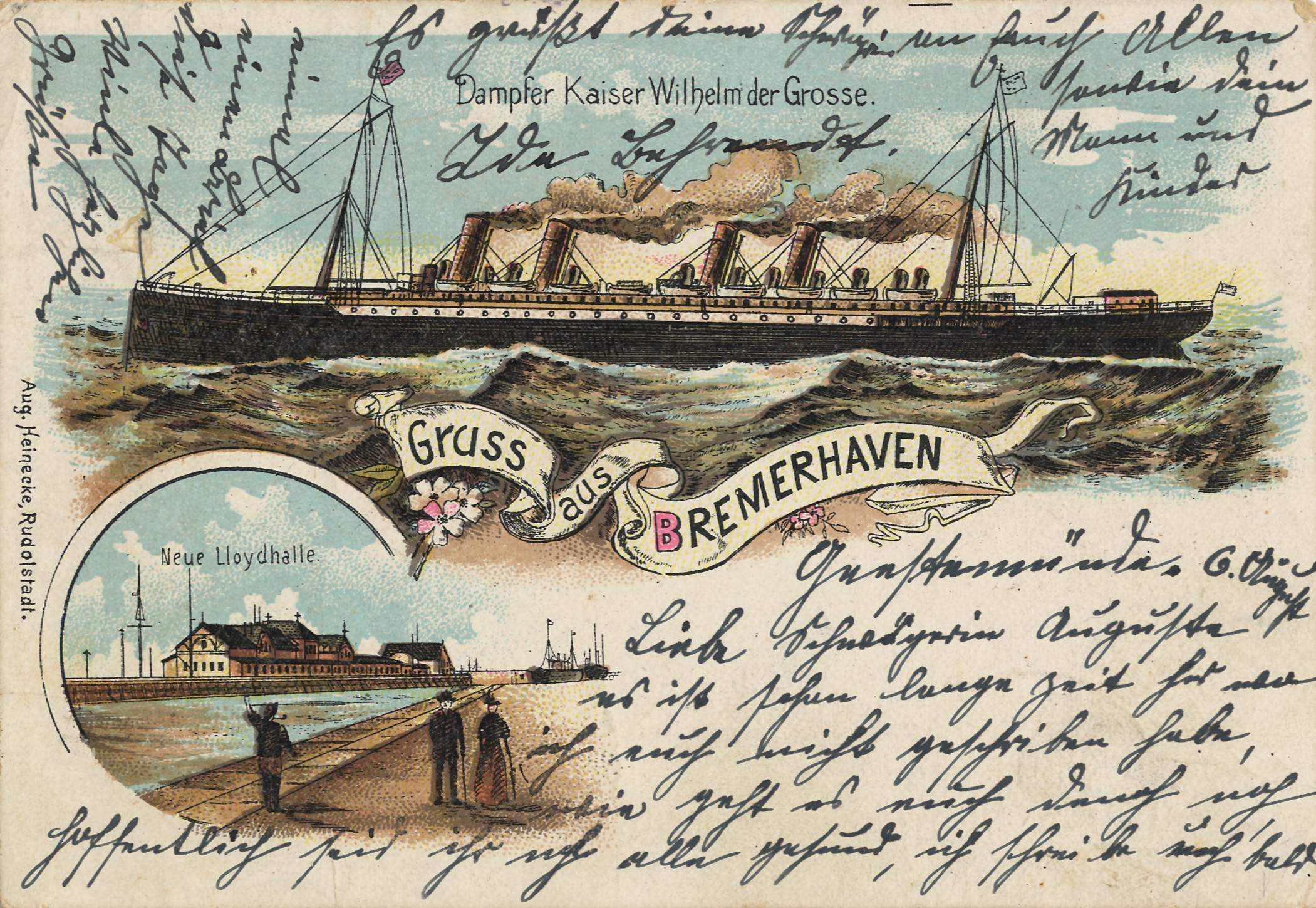
Second Lloydhalle in 1897 and steamer SS Kaiser Wilhelm

On July 27, 1900, Kaiser Wilhelm II gave his well-known "Hun Speech" in front of the Lloyd Hall at the send off of the German East Asian Expeditionary Force (China-Expedition) to suppress the Boxer Rebellion in Imperial China. The speech was seen by many as a failure.

The Columbus Cruise Center and the Columbusbahnhof were completed in 1927 in order to be able to handle the large express steamers of the NDL, such as the Columbus, Bremen or Europa, more quickly at the conveniently located Stromkaje. After the facilities were commissioned, the Lloyd Hall was only used for passenger handling on small emigrant ships. In 1944 it was destroyed by bombs.

The third Lloyd Hall was built in 1927 during the construction of Columbuskaje and the Columbusbahnhof.

The Lloyd Hall was named after the shipping company Norddeutscher Lloyd. The Lloyd part of the name comes from Edward Lloyd, who opened Lloyd's Coffee House in London in 1688 and which is believed to be the founding place of Lloyd's of London, then a thriving marine insurer and now an insurance exchange. The term Lloyd stood for seriousness worldwide.
