= Kronberg Castle =

Castle in Hesse, Germany

Coordinates: 50°10′52″N 8°30′24″E

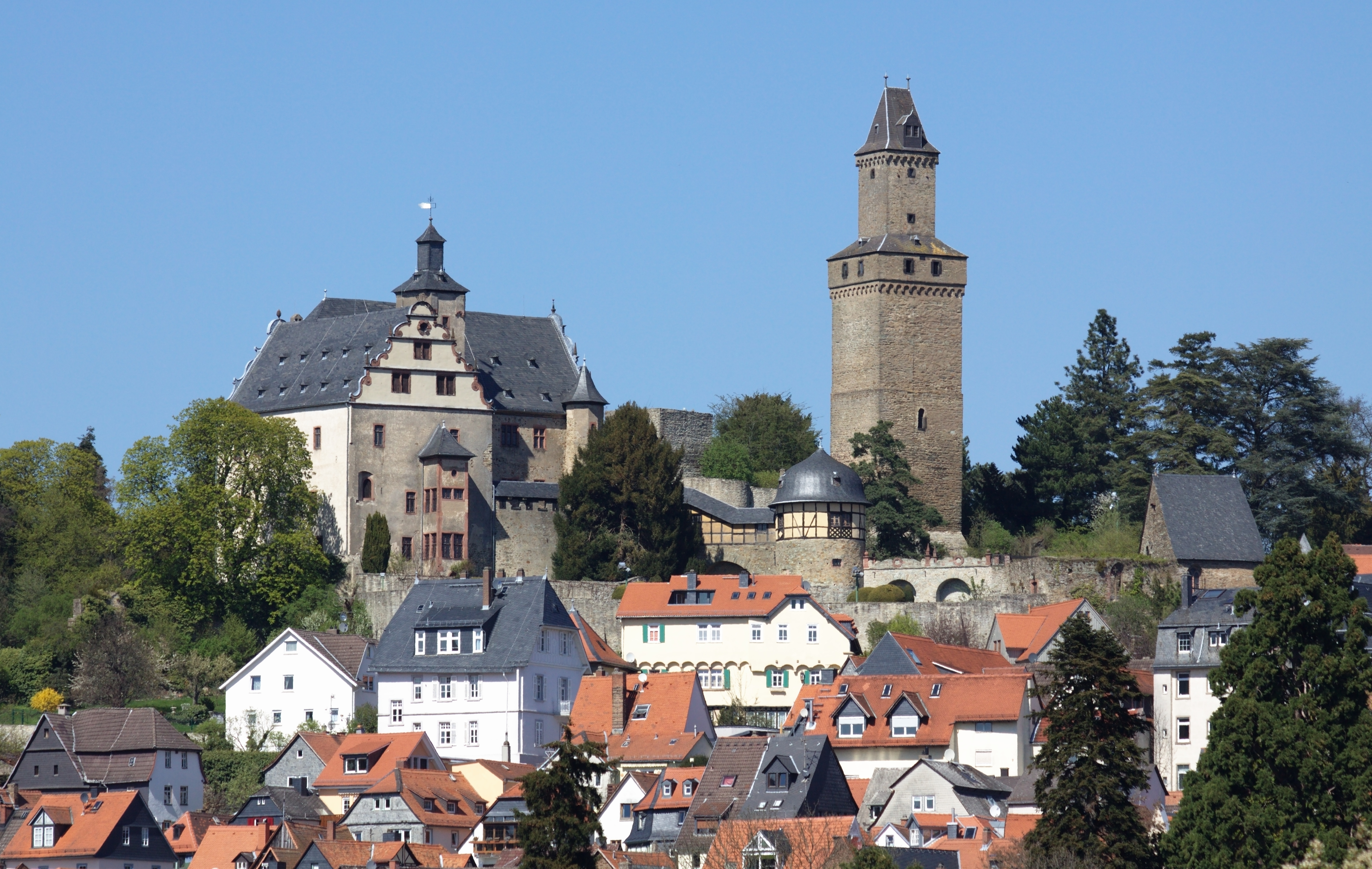

Kronberg Castle is a High Middle Ages Rock castle in Kronberg im Taunus, Hochtaunuskreis district, Hesse state, Germany. The castle is beside Altkönig in Taunus. The castle was built between 1220 and 1230.
