= Hitler: A Career =

1977 documentary film about Adolf Hitler

- German: Hitler - Eine Karriere
- Directed by: Christian Herrendoerfer; Joachim Fest
- Written by: Joachim Fest
- Produced by: Werner Rieb
- Music by: Hans Posegga
- Release date: 1977
- Running time: 150 minutes
- Country: West Germany
- Languages: German; English

Hitler: A Career (German: Hitler – Eine Karriere) is a 1977 West German documentary film about the career of Adolf Hitler directed by Christian Herrendoerfer and Joachim Fest and written by Fest, a German historian.

== Premise ==
The film, exclusively utilising archival footage, closely examines Hitler's rise to power, and also aims to explain why people living in Germany loved Hitler. Fest argues that Hitler was a clever, scheming and incredibly adaptable politician, who was keen to exploit any weakness he saw in the political system and in the masses who, humiliated by the outcome of WWI, were willing to support a voice that spoke for them.

== Release ==
The film was initially received with controversy among some critics, especially in Germany. American historian Deborah Lipstadt wrote that by featuring extensive clips of Hitler from propaganda films and entirely ignoring the Holocaust, Fest had engaged in a glorification of a murderer.

== See also ==
Similar documentaries about Hitler involving extensive use of archival footage:

- Black Fox: The Rise and Fall of Adolf Hitler (1962)
- Swastika (1973)
- All This and World War II (1976)
