= Plotting Hitler's Death =

1994 book by Joachim Fest

Plotting Hitler's Death: The German Resistance To Hitler, 1933–1945
- Cover of the British first edition
- Author: Joachim Fest
- Language: German
- Subject: Adolf Hitler
- Media type: Print
- ISBN: 978-0-297-81774-1

Plotting Hitler's Death: The German Resistance To Hitler, 1933–1945 is a 1994 book by the historian Joachim Fest about the Germans, both civilian and military, who plotted to kill Adolf Hitler from 1933 onwards. It was written to mark the 50th anniversary of the 20 July plot to kill Hitler and translated into English in 1996. The book includes detailed accounts of various plots and explores the reasons the Allies and many within Germany gave little support to the resistance to Hitler. Among those treated extensively in the book are Colonel Henning von Tresckow and, later, Lieutenant Colonel Claus Schenk Graf von Stauffenberg.

== See also ==
- List of books by or about Adolf Hitler
