= Joachim Fest =

German historian (1926–2006)

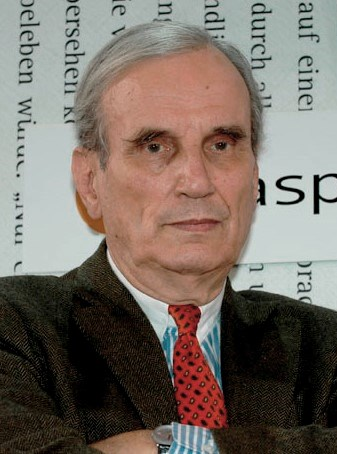
- Fest in 2004
- Born: Joachim Clemens Fest; 8 December 1926; Berlin, Prussia, Germany
- Died: 11 September 2006 (aged 79); Kronberg im Taunus, Hesse, Germany
- Education: University of Freiburg
- Occupations: Historian; journalist
- Known for: Writings and commentary on Adolf Hitler and Nazi Germany

Joachim Clemens Fest (8 December 1926 – 11 September 2006) was a German historian, journalist, critic and editor who was best known for his writings and public commentary on Nazi Germany, including a biography of Adolf Hitler and books about Albert Speer and German resistance to Nazism. He was a leading figure in the debate among German historians about the Nazi era.

== Early life and career ==
Fest was born in the Karlshorst locality of Berlin, the son of Johannes Fest, a conservative Roman Catholic and staunch anti-Nazi schoolteacher who was dismissed from his post when the Nazis came to power in 1933. In 1936, when Fest turned 10, his family refused to make him join the Hitler Youth, a step that could have had serious repercussions for the family although membership became compulsory only in 1939. As it was, Fest was expelled from his school and then went to a Catholic boarding school in Freiburg im Breisgau in Baden, where he was able to avoid Hitler Youth service until he was 18.

In December 1944, when he turned 18, Fest decided to enlist in the Wehrmacht, mainly to avoid being conscripted into the Waffen-SS. His father opposed even that concession by saying that "one does not volunteer for Hitler's criminal war". His military service in the Second World War was brief and ended when he surrendered in France. After the war, he studied law, history, sociology, German literature and art history at the University of Freiburg, in Frankfurt am Main and in Berlin.

After he had graduated, he started working for the American-run Berlin radio station RIAS (Radio in the American Sector). There, from 1954 to 1961, he was the editor in charge of contemporary history and was asked to present radio portraits of the main historical personalities who had influenced the course of German history from Otto von Bismarck to the Second World War, including leading figures of the Nazi regime such as Heinrich Himmler and Joseph Goebbels. The portraits were later published as his first book, The Face of the Third Reich: Portraits of the Nazi Leadership.

In 1961, Fest was appointed editor-in-chief of television for the North German broadcasting service Norddeutscher Rundfunk (NDR) in which he was also responsible for the political television magazine Panorama.

== Career in writing ==
Fest then embarked on his biography of Adolf Hitler, published in 1973. The first major biography of Hitler since that of Alan Bullock in 1952 and the first by a German writer, it appeared at a time when the younger generation of Germans was confronting the legacy of the Nazi period. It sparked controversy among German historians, because Fest, a political conservative, rejected the then dominant view that the causes of Hitler's rise to power had been largely economic. He instead believed that the Third Reich's rise to power was the result of millions of Germans turning a blind eye to Hitler or actively supporting him.

Fest explained Hitler's success in terms of what he called the "great fear" that had overcome the German middle classes, as a result not only of Bolshevism and First World War dislocation but also more broadly in response to rapid modernization, which had led to a romantic longing for a lost past. That led to resentment of other groups, especially Jews, which were seen as agents of modernity. It also made many Germans susceptible to a figure such as Hitler who could articulate their mood. "He was never only their leader, he was always their voice... the people, as if electrified, recognised themselves in him".

In 1977, Fest directed a documentary entitled Hitler: A Career. Fest's film, which aimed to explain why ordinary people in Germany loved Hitler, created some controversy among some critics such as the American historian Deborah Lipstadt, who wrote that by featuring extensive clips of Hitler from propaganda films and totally ignoring the Holocaust, Fest had engaged in the glorification of a murderer.

Fest served as the editorial aide for Albert Speer, Hitler's court architect and later Minister for Munitions, while Speer worked on his autobiography, Inside the Third Reich (1970). After Speer's death, amid controversy over the reliability of the memoirs, Fest wrote Speer: The Final Verdict (2002) in which he criticized Speer for deliberate complicity in the crimes of the Nazi regime, which Speer had successfully concealed during the Nuremberg Trials.

Fest wrote his other major work on German history, Plotting Hitler's Death: The German Resistance to Hitler (1994), to mark the 50th anniversary of the 20 July plot to assassinate Hitler. This work marked a partial reconsideration of his earlier harsh verdict on the German people. He acknowledged that many Germans had opposed the Nazi regime within the limits imposed on them by their circumstances. He maintained his view, however, most Germans had willfully refused to accept the truth about Nazism until it was too late.

In 2002, Fest published Inside Hitler's Bunker: The Last Days of the Third Reich, a work that was based in part on available evidence following the opening of the Soviet archives but largely confirmed the account of Hitler's death given in Hugh Trevor-Roper's book The Last Days of Hitler (1947). Inside Hitler's Bunker, along with the memoirs of Hitler's personal secretary Traudl Junge, provided the source material for the 2004 German film Der Untergang (Downfall), the third postwar German feature film to depict Hitler directly.

== Career in journalism and criticism ==
After the Hitler biography, Fest became co-editor of the Frankfurter Allgemeine Zeitung, one of the leading German newspapers based in Frankfurt am Main and an institution in the German-speaking world. From 1973 to 1993, he edited the culture section of the paper. His views were generally conservative, pessimistic and sceptical, and he was particularly critical of the left-wing views that dominated German intellectual life from the late 1960s up to the collapse of communism in 1991. He took a leading role in the Historikerstreit (historians' dispute) of 1986–89, in which he was identified with those rejecting what they saw as the left-wing hegemony in German historiography in this period.

== Reception ==
Fest's biography of Hitler has been praised for its literary qualities and described as a milestone in the history of the Federal Republic of Germany. Others have criticized it as weakly researched and too dependent on dubious testimony by Albert Speer. Fest has been accused of helping Speer create legends about his role during the war.

== Personal life ==
Joachim Fest was lastly married to Ingrid Ascher and had two sons from a previous marriage and a daughter; all his children followed him into publishing or the media. He died at his home in Kronberg im Taunus near Frankfurt am Main in 2006, the same year that his autobiography Not Me: Memoirs of a German Childhood was published. Fest took the main title from an incident in his childhood when, at the age of ten, he and his brother were summoned to their father's study after he had been dismissed from his post as headmaster at a school. Fest's father asked his sons to write down and remember a maxim from the Gospel of Matthew: Etiam si omnes – ego non (Even if all others [do] – not me).

== Works ==
In German

- Das Gesicht des Dritten Reiches: Porträt einer totalitären Herrschaft, R. Piper & Co. Verlag, 1963, München.
- Speer: Eine Biographie, Fischer TB Verlag, 2001, Frankfurt am Main (ISBN 3-596-15093-0)
- Ich nicht: Erinnerungen an eine Kindheit und Jugend, Rowohlt Verlag, 2006–09, Reinbek (ISBN 3-498-05305-1)
- Hitler: Eine Biographie, Spiegel-Verlag, 2006–07, Hamburg (ISBN 978-3-87763-031-0)
- Nach dem Scheitern der Utopien: Gesammelte Essays zu Politik und Geschichte, Rowohlt Verlag, 2007–09, Reinbek (ISBN 978-3-498-02119-1)
- Flüchtige Größe. Gesammelte Essays über Literatur und Kunst, Rowohlt Verlag, 2008, Reinbek (ISBN 978-3-498-02123-8)

In English

- Hitler (ISBN 0-15-602754-2), 1973. Published in English 1974.
- "Encumbered Remembrance: The Controversy about the Incomparability of National-Socialist Mass Crimes", pages 63–71 & "Postscript, April 21, 1987", pages 264–265 from Forever In The Shadow of Hitler? Edited by Ernst Piper, Humanities Press, Atlantic Highlands, New Jersey, 1993, (ISBN 0-391-03784-6).
- Inside Hitler's Bunker: The Last Days of the Third Reich (ISBN 0-374-13577-0)
- The Face of the Third Reich: Portraits of the Nazi Leadership. Da Capo Press. 1999. p. 420. ISBN 978-0-306-80915-6.
- Speer: The Final Verdict (ISBN 0-15-100556-7)
- Plotting Hitler's Death: The German Resistance to Hitler, 1933-1945 (ISBN 0-8050-5648-3)
- Not Me: Memoirs of a German Childhood, trans. Martin Chalmers, Atlantic 2012 (ISBN 978-1-84354-931-4)

== See also ==
- Bibliography of Adolf Hitler

== Sources ==
- Grab, Walter (1987). "German Historians and the Trivialization of Nazi Criminality: Critical Remarks on the Apologetics of Joachim Fest, Ernst Nolte and Andreas Hillgruber". Australian Journal of Politics and History. 33 (3): 273–278. doi:10.1111/j.1467-8497.1987.tb00152.x.
- Lipstadt, Deborah (1977). Denying the Holocaust. New York: Free Press.
- Maier, Charles (1 December 1986). "Immoral Equivalence". The New Republic. Vol. 195, no. 22. pp. 36–41.
