= Hermann Knackfuss =

German painter and writer

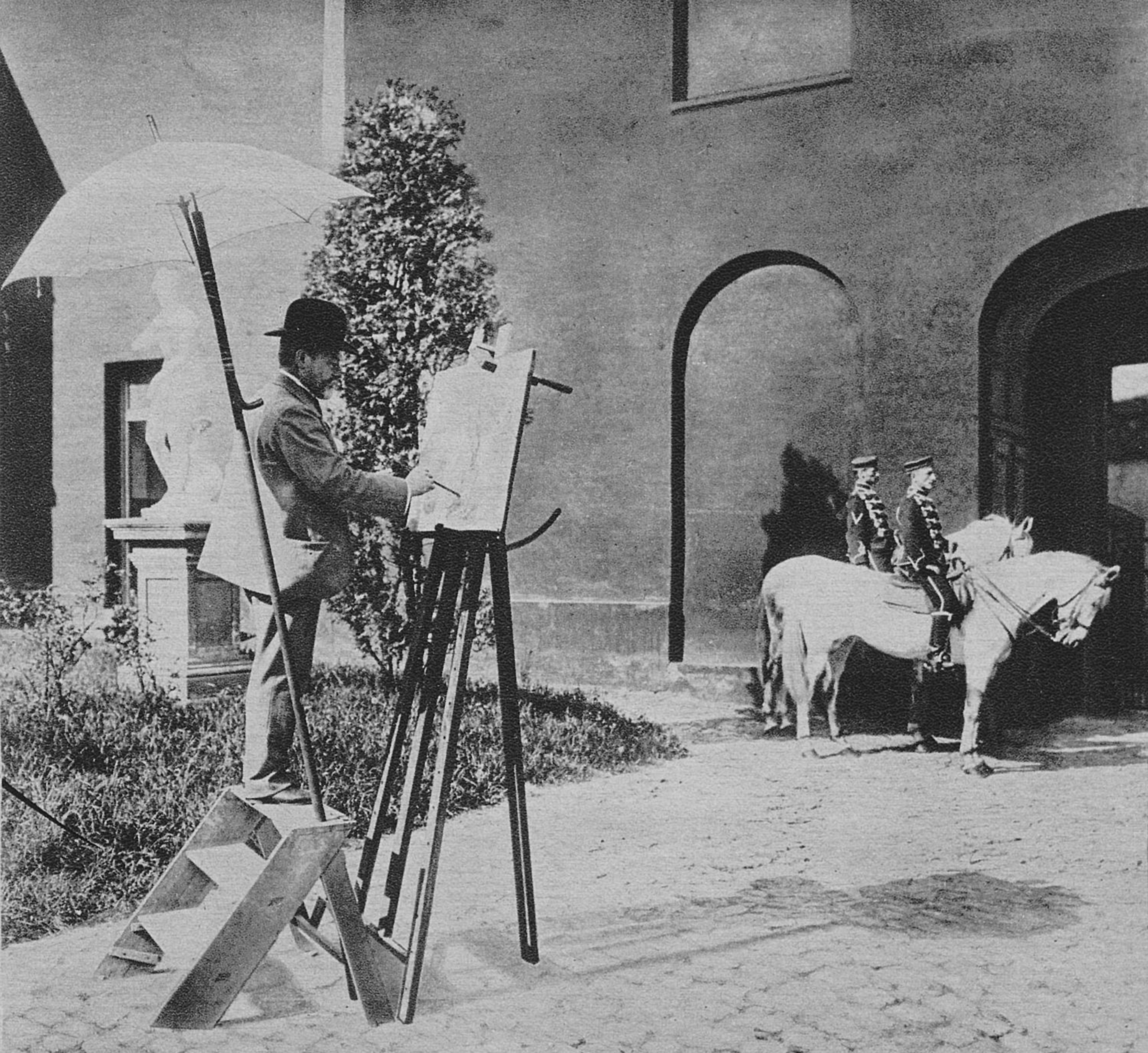
Hermann Knackfuss in 1915

Hermann Knackfuss (German: Hermann Knackfuß; August 11, 1848 – May 17, 1915) was a German painter and writer on art. He is known for his historical paintings, but his most-recognized work is his illustration on behalf of the German Emperor Wilhelm II, Peoples of Europe, Guard your Dearest Goods, which has become an iconic symbol of the use of the yellow peril to justify European imperialism in Asia at the end of the nineteenth century.

== Biography ==
Hermann Knackfuss was born in Wissen, Rhenish Prussia. He studied at the Düsseldorf Academy between 1869 and 1874, where he was a student of Eduard Bendemann, Julius Roeting, and Eduard von Gebhardt. In 1870, he interrupted his studies to serve as a volunteer in the Franco-Prussian War. His illustrations of the war's progress during his service would appear in the magazine Die Gartenlaube. While studying at Düsseldorf, he won the state prize in 1874, which paid for his studies at Rome from 1875 to 1878. In 1880, Knackfuss was appointed to the Cassel Academy. Initially, he taught anatomy, but from 1890 onwards he also taught history of art (1890).

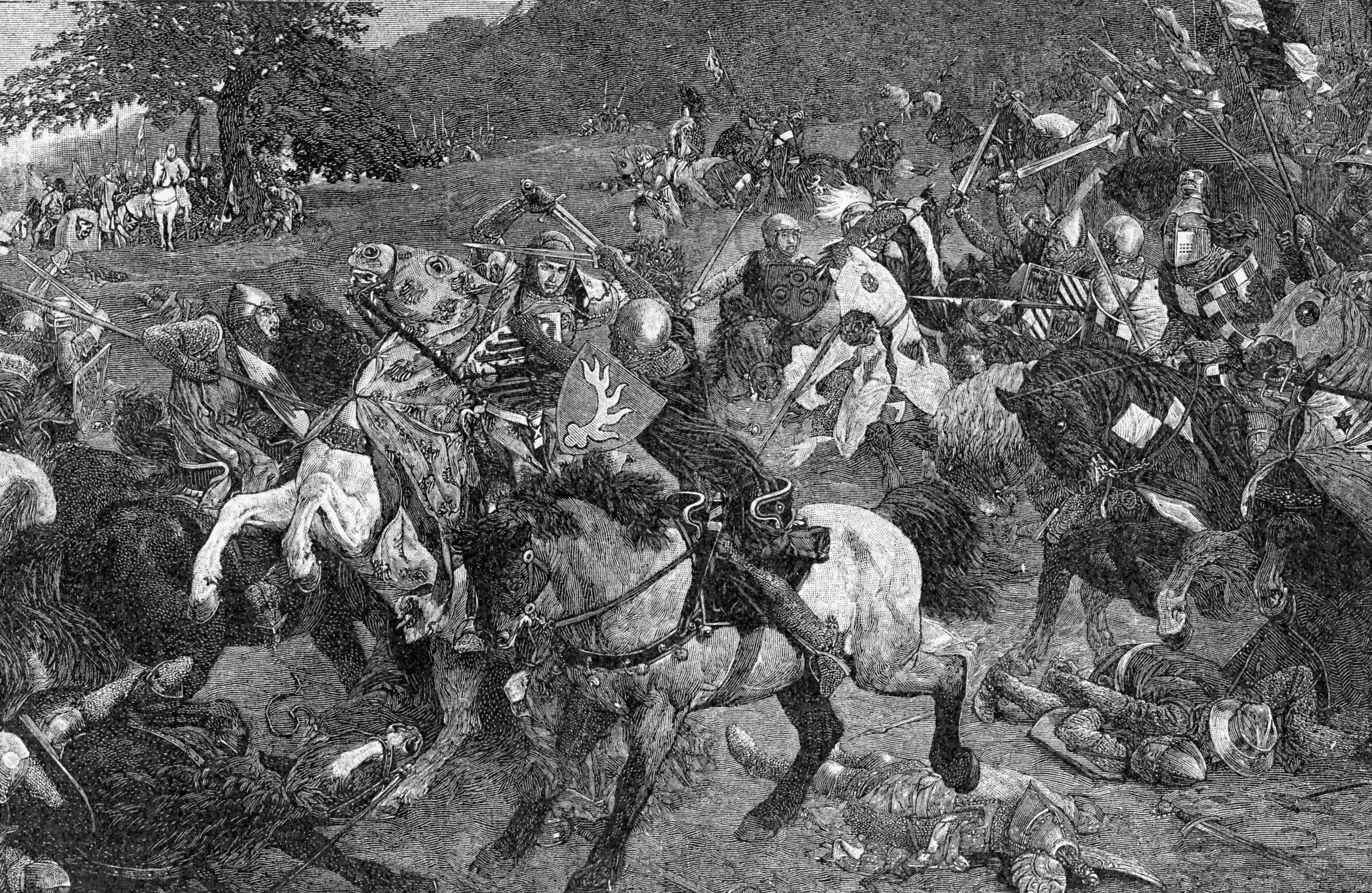
Knackfuss's painting of the Battle of Mühldorf

Knackfuss primarily created historical paintings, many of which depicted events in the history of Prussia. Many of these were created for public buildings. For example, he made frescoes for the entrance hall of the Strasbourg train station. Early in his career, his paintings were characterized by a sometimes pedantic-looking realism that focused on small details such as the historical accuracy of the costumes. From around 1890, his historical works developed a more impressionist style. In addition to his historical works, Knackfuss was also a sought-after portraitist of the Prussian nobility.

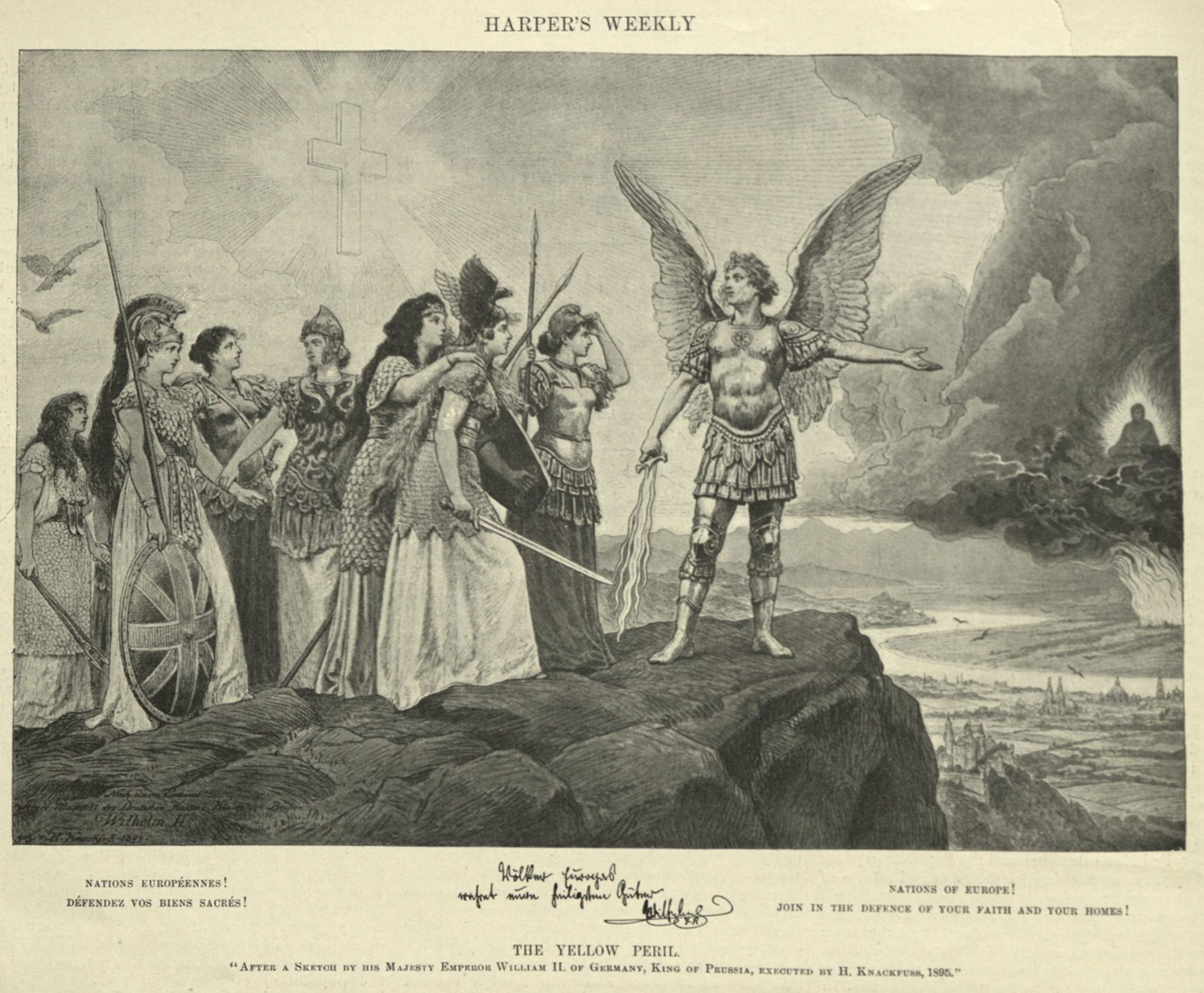
Völker Europas, wahrt eure heiligsten Güter ("Peoples of Europe, Guard your Dearest Goods," 1895)

In 1895, the German emperor Wilhelm II commissioned Knackfuss to create allegorical works on behalf of the emperor. One commission was People of Europe, Guard Your Dearest Goods, based on a rough sketch by Wilhelm that highlighted his fear of the yellow peril after the end of the First Sino-Japanese War. This particular political illustration was sent to Europe's political leaders, including Nicholas II of Russia, and it was mass-distributed through the Leipziger illustrirte Zeitung. It has become Knackfuss's most famous work.

Knackfuss also traveled extensively to Greece, Spain, Italy, Asia Minor and Egypt, and accompanied Emperor Wilhelm II to Palestine in 1898. Knackfuss died of typhus in 1915 during World War I while serving as a guard at the Niederzwehren POW camp in Kassel.

== Legacy ==
Knackfuss's role as an academic history painter and an illustrator of Prussian history was largely forgotten after 1945, especially since many of his paintings were destroyed during World War II. Even in Germany, he now mainly known as the author of numerous art monographs, including biographies on Michelangelo, Raphael, Titian, Velasquez, Murillo, Rubens, van Dyck, Rembrandt, Frans Hals, Holbein the Elder, Holbein the Younger and Albrecht Dürer.

== Works ==
Knackfuss's paintings include:

- Battle of Mühldorf (originally belonging to Wilhelm II)
- Battle of Turin, in Berlin Zeughaus
- Mural decorations for the officers' casino of the Potsdam Treppenhaus
- Entry of the Kaiser and Kaiserin into Jerusalem (1902)
- Holy Family altar picture in the Fulda Cathedral (1893)
- Mural decorations in the Wohlau (Silesia) gymnasium

His writings include:

- Deutsche Kunstgeschichte (“German art history,” 1888)
- Articles on Raphael, Rembrandt Rubens, Michelangelo, Dürer, Murillo, Holbein, Titian, Velazquez, Frans Hall, van Dyck, Menzel, Teniers and others, for the serial Kunstler-monographien (“Artist monographs”) published by Velhagen & Klasing.
