= Orphan (soundtrack) =

Orphan (Original Motion Picture Soundtrack)

Film score by John Ottman
- Released: July 21, 2009
- Recorded: May 2–5, 2009
- Studio: Studio X, Seattle, Texas; The Playroom, Holmby Hills, Los Angeles; Air-Edel Recording Studios, London
- Genre: Film score
- Length: 54:56
- Label: Varèse Sarabande
- Producer: John Ottman

John Ottman chronology
Valkyrie (2008)	Orphan (2009)	Astro Boy (2009)

Orphan (Original Motion Picture Soundtrack) is the film score composed by John Ottman to the 2009 film Orphan directed by Jaume Collet-Serra, starring Vera Farmiga, Peter Sarsgaard, Isabelle Fuhrman, CCH Pounder, and Jimmy Bennett. The film score is composed by John Ottman and released through Varèse Sarabande on July 21, 2009.

== Background ==
John Ottman composed the film score in his second collaboration with Jaume after House of Wax (2005). After he finished working on Valkyrie (2008), the producer Joel Silver contacted Ottman to be involved in this project, though he was unaware about Jaume's involvement who "trusts the instincts of the composer". When he watched the rough cut of the film, the temp score featured only "standard booms, bangs and drones" which tried to pull it to the silly horror template score. Hence, he was tasked to create a "classy" score, where the music had to be less overt to bring out the best assets of the film, and needed an emotional core musically.

Both Ottman and Jamie believed the psychological aspect of the music over the soundscape. Hence, he was tasked to compose a theme that represented the familial bond between Kate and her children, Jessica and Max. In an earlier scene, where Kate is seen playing a piano, Ottman understood that the music which the character writes should also serve as a theme of the film. Hence, the piano piece which Vera Farmiga played on set had to be stripped during recording and a rudimentary version of the cue "Suite for Jessica and Max" played in three movements—one being a simple classical piano movement, the other being a melancholic piano that served as a mournful theme for Jessica, and the final movement was an eclectic theme for Max, which was characterised by the use of electric piano, harp, harmonies and muted synth. The theme was also alluded in sequences where Kate confronts the demons of the past. Hence, while writing Kate's music as a standalone theme, it also allowed Ottman to provide a familial bond with her children, musically. The ending cue "Orphan" was a misleading title for him, as it is a chopped and screwed version of "Suite for Jessica and Max".

For the music of Esther, Ottman want to go with the introduction of the flow where a warm, inviting music had to be played when Kate and her husband meets Esther, and when Esther is taken home, her music consisted of a three-note motif rotating on a clarinet imbedded in rich synthesized textures. As the film progresses, those themes were receded by odd sounds. Ottman felt that a simple sound for Esther would be more unsettling than a theme, so that the music would preserve the character's mystery. He used a lone cluster of three African shakers playing slightly out of sonic that provided a sonic motif which was unsettling but also effective as well. The other motif for Esther features the song, "Glory of Love" which had three versions, one covered by Jimmy Durante, the other by Isabelle Fuhrman and an eerie choir version.

Ottman admitted that the use of synths helped him to provide a less clichéd feel than the use of straight orchestra. Hence, the score was a combination of synth and orchestra. This prompted him to initially refrain from distributing physical formats of the album, as synth music would not often make the best listening experience on a CD, but as the producers persuaded him, more than 55 minutes of the music had been present in the album over the 90 minutes of music involved in the film. He admitted that the listening experience of the score should not be judged while hearing on CD.

== Release ==
Varèse Sarabande released the soundtrack album on July 21, 2009.

== Track listing ==
No.	Title	Artist(s)	Length
1.	"Glory of Love"	Isabelle Fuhrman	0:24
2.	"Orphan"		2:04
3.	"Suite for Jessica and Max"		5:27
4.	"Opening / Labor of Love"		2:35
5.	"Not Your Average 9-Year-Old"		3:59
6.	"Silent Story / Max's Theme"		3:34
7.	"Saint Marianas"		1:32
8.	"Destroying the Evidence"		3:09
9.	"Painting a Story / Esther Comes Home"		2:51
10.	"Something Nice"		5:36
11.	"Wet the Bed / Black Light"		2:43
12.	"Snooping"		1:48
13.	"Finishing the Job"		3:08
14.	"Finding Max"		3:44
15.	"The Cold Shoulder"		3:07
16.	"The Glory of Love"	Orphanesta featuring Krystle Warren	2:49
17.	"Orphan's Revenge"	John Ottman vs Mark "Dog" Sayfritz	3:38
18.	"The Glory of Love"	Jimmy Durante	2:48
Total length:			54:56

== Reception ==
Jonathan Broxton of Movie Music UK wrote "the electronic element of the score which dominates the sound palette, overpowering whatever subtleties or nuances Ottman was trying to create elsewhere" calling it a disappointment as his composition was "obfuscated by cheap-sounding synth". Christian Clemmensen of Filmtracks wrote "perhaps a bland suspense score with ten minutes of beautiful thematic material alone is the best we could hope for."

Brent Simon of Screen International wrote "John Ottman's score is overly familiar, but Jimmy Durante's cover of Billy Hill's The Glory of Love - a song Esther sings in the movie - provides ironic counterpoint to Orphan's denouement over the closing credits." Johnson Thomas of Daily News and Analysis called it an "enticing score". Manohla Dargis of The New York Times called the score "eerie".

== Personnel ==
Credits adapted from liner notes:

- Music composer and producer – John Ottman
- Orchestrator – John Ottman, Ruben Panini
- Conductor – Pablo Heisenberg
- Synth programming – John Ottman, Kristopher Gee
- Piano solos – Ruben Panini
- Recording – Reed Ruddy
- Mixing – Larry Mah
- Mastering – Nick Taylor, Tony Dixon
- Music editor – Amanda Goodpaster, Joseph Bonn
- Music contractor – Seattle Music
- Copyist – Robert Puff
- Executive producer – Andy Ross, Robert Townson
- Music clearance – Christine Bergren
