= German Resistance Memorial Center =

Memorial and museum in Berlin, Germany

Coordinates: 52°30′28″N 13°21′45″E

- Gedenkstätte Deutscher Widerstand

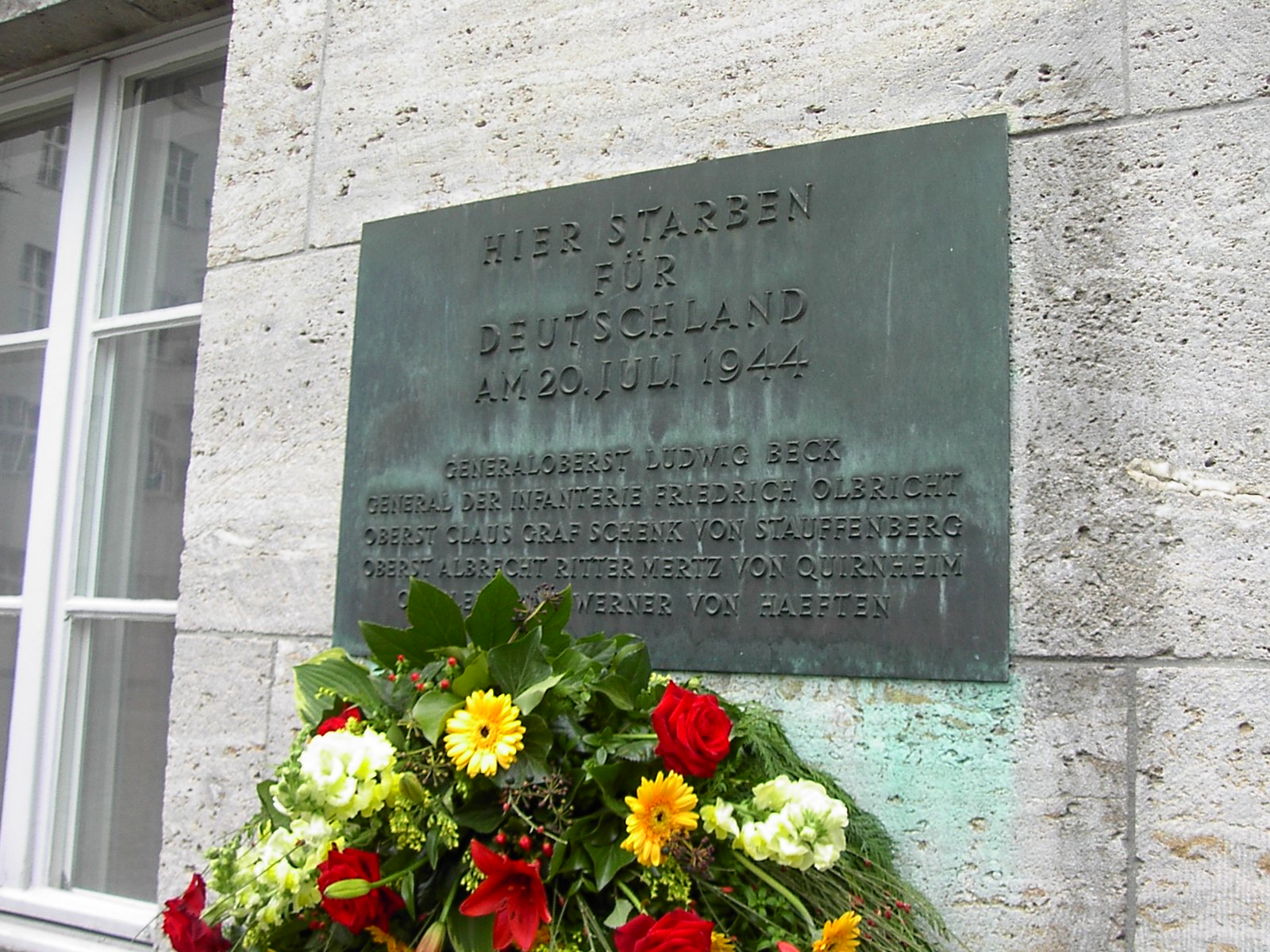
- A plaque in the inner courtyard of the Memorial to the German Resistance, near the spot where Stauffenberg and others were executed in July 1944
- Established: 1980
- Location: Bendlerblock, Tiergarten, Berlin, Germany
- Directors: Johannes Tuchel and Peter Steinbach
- Website: gdw-berlin.de/en

The German Resistance Memorial Center (German: Gedenkstätte Deutscher Widerstand (GDW)) is a memorial and museum in Berlin, capital of Germany.

== History ==
It was opened in 1980 in part of the Bendlerblock, a complex of offices in Stauffenbergstraße (formerly Bendlerstraße), south of the Großer Tiergarten in Tiergarten. It was here that Colonel Claus Schenk Graf von Stauffenberg and other leaders of the 20 July plot, who had just attempted to assassinate Adolf Hitler as a decapitation strike and a prelude to regime change, were executed without trial after the plot failed.

Although the memorial is primarily intended to commemorate those members of the Wehrmacht who tried to assassinate Hitler in 1944, it is also a memorial to the German resistance in the broader sense. Historians agree that there was no united, national resistance movement in Nazi Germany at any time during Hitler's years in power (1933–45). Joachim Fest describes it as "the resistance that never was." In the divided, ideologically different, and often mutually hostile nature of the many different resistance groups, however, Germany was actually highly similar to other countries in Nazi-ruled Europe.

Nevertheless, the umbrella term "German Resistance" (Deutscher Widerstand) is now widely used to describe all elements of opposition and resistance under the Orwellian Nazi Regime, including the underground networks of the SPD and KPD, dissident writers and intellectuals living a secret life of inner emigration and who defied government censorship by illegally circulated anti-Nazi samizdat literature like Weiße Rose ('White Rose'), opposition activities of the Catholic Church and other Christian denominations such as the Confessing Church, along with the resistance groups based in the civil service, intelligence organs and armed forces.

== Design ==
The visitor enters the museum from Stauffenbergstraße through an archway, on the wall of which is inscribed: "Here in the former Supreme Headquarters of the Army, Germans organized the attempt of 20 July 1944 to end the Nazi rule of injustice. For this, they sacrificed their lives. The Federal Republic of Germany and the State of Berlin created this new memorial place in the year 1980." The visitor then enters the central courtyard, in which a statue of a naked man marks the place where the conspirators were executed. A plaque on a wall nearby commemorates this event. In front of the statue, embedded in the ground, is a plaque that reads in German:

Ihr trugt die Schande nicht. Ihr wehrtet euch. Ihr gabt das große ewig wache Zeichen der Umkehr, opfernd Euer heißes Leben für Freiheit, Recht und Ehre.

[You did not bear the shame. You resisted. You bestowed the eternally vigilant signal to turn back by sacrificing your impassioned lives for freedom, justice and honour.]

The entrance to the museum, which occupies three floors of one of the Bendlerblock buildings, is nearby.

== Museum exhibits ==
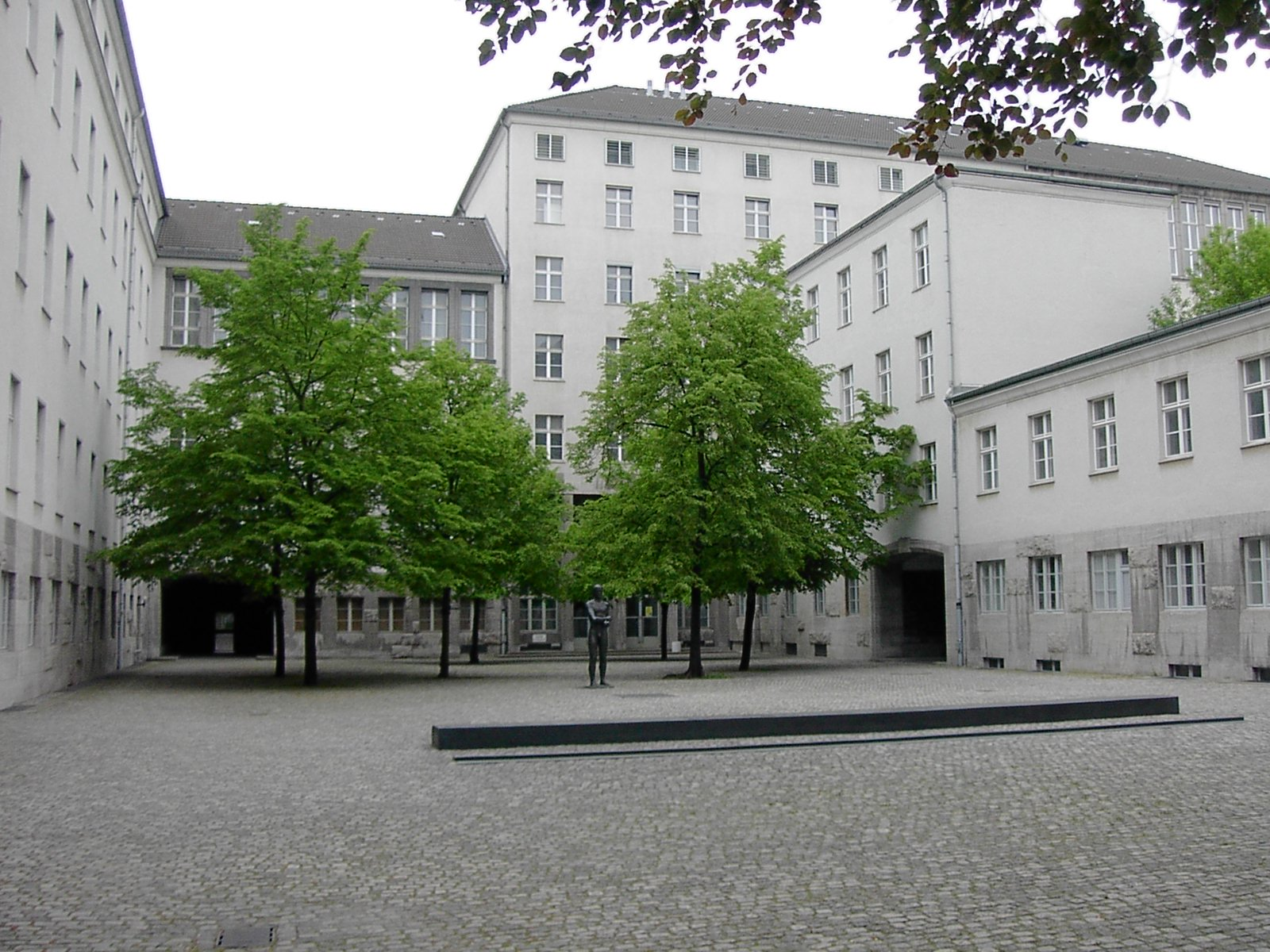
The courtyard in the Bendlerblock where the 20 July conspirators were executed. The Memorial to the German Resistance is located in the buildings to the left of the photo.

The museum consists of a series of displays chronicling the history of Nazi Germany and of all those individuals and groups who opposed the single party state of the era and its ideology, irrespective of their motivations. All resisters are given equal respect. The museum, while seeking to show the many strands of German culture which engaged in opposition to the state, does not seek to disguise the fact that the majority of Germans believed, at least publicly, in the cult of personality and the Hitler Myth or that there was never an effective or unified national resistance movement.

Particular attention is given to 20 July plot military resistance leaders such as Claus von Stauffenberg, Ludwig Beck, Erwin von Witzleben, Günther von Kluge, Erich Hoepner, Hans Oster and Friedrich Olbricht. This is because their legacy has permanently changed the ideology of the German armed forces. Since its creation during West German rearmament in the 1950s, the modern Bundeswehr holds that military officers and enlisted men have a moral duty (German: Innere Führung) which goes beyond befehlsnotstand ('blind obedience') to superior orders, and that the officers who plotted to kill Hitler were not traitors, but heroes who died trying to save the German people from continued rule by a genocidal police state.

Every 20 July, the German government and armed forces perform a joint memorial ceremony and military funeral for the executed officers, during which a wreath is solemnly laid at the site of their deaths before a Nazi firing squad. During these annual ceremonies, the traditional German soldiers' lament Ich hatt' einen Kameraden ('I had a comrade'), which dates from the Napoleonic Wars, is played on the trumpet.

At the museum, refugees living in the comparative safety of the German diaspora, including dissident intellectuals, like Thomas Mann, Bertolt Brecht, and Hannah Arendt, who published anti-Nazi Exilliteratur or who, like Hollywood actors Marlene Dietrich and Conrad Veidt, otherwise assisted the Allied war effort against Nazi Germany, are also treated not as traitors, but as heroes who also sought to rescue the German people from tyranny.

The museum also makes a particular point of both demonstrating and criticizing how Hitler manipulated, exploited, and weaponized anti-Semitism, Eugenics, ultra-nationalism, and scientific racism to seize absolute power and then led the German people to the ruin and starvation of the Second World War and its aftermath as their dictator. Graphic examples of Nazi anti-Semitic propaganda are accordingly displayed. The museum reproduces many official documents, newspapers, posters, anti-Nazi samizdat handbills, private letters and photographs: more than 5,000 individual items in all.

Although it was nearly two decades before the foundation of the museum and memorial, U.S. President John F. Kennedy praised the Federal Republic of Germany on 25 June 1963 for having carefully studied and learned what he considered the morally correct lessons from both the best and worst chapters of German history, and how this understanding was still being used to build a future for post-war Germany with a democratically elected government and membership in the NATO military alliance.

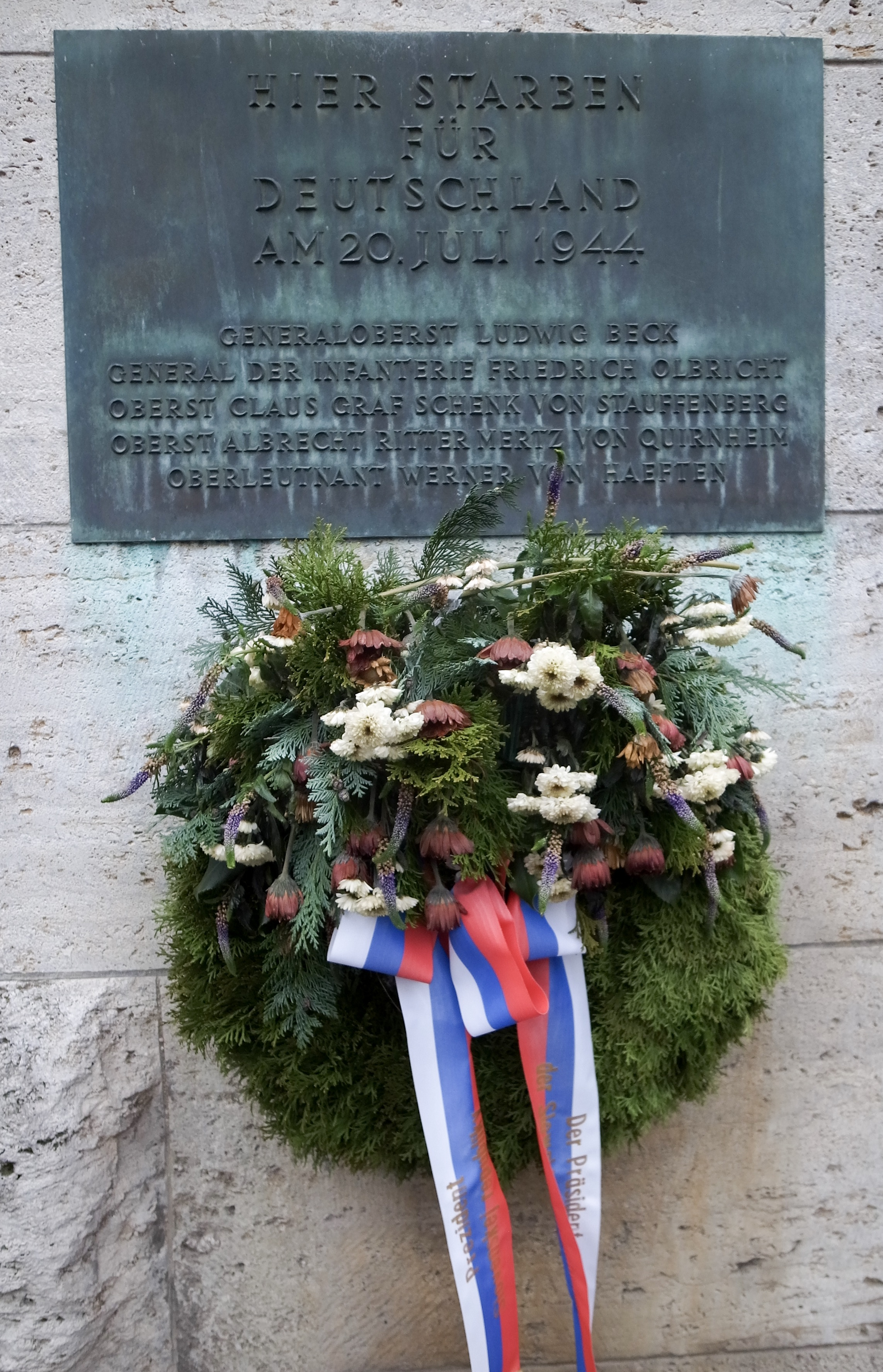

== In popular culture ==
- As a post-script to the 2008 film Valkyrie, directed by Bryan Singer and about the July 20 plot, the dedication from the Memorial to the German Resistance is displayed onscreen.
