= Bendlerblock =

Building complex in Berlin

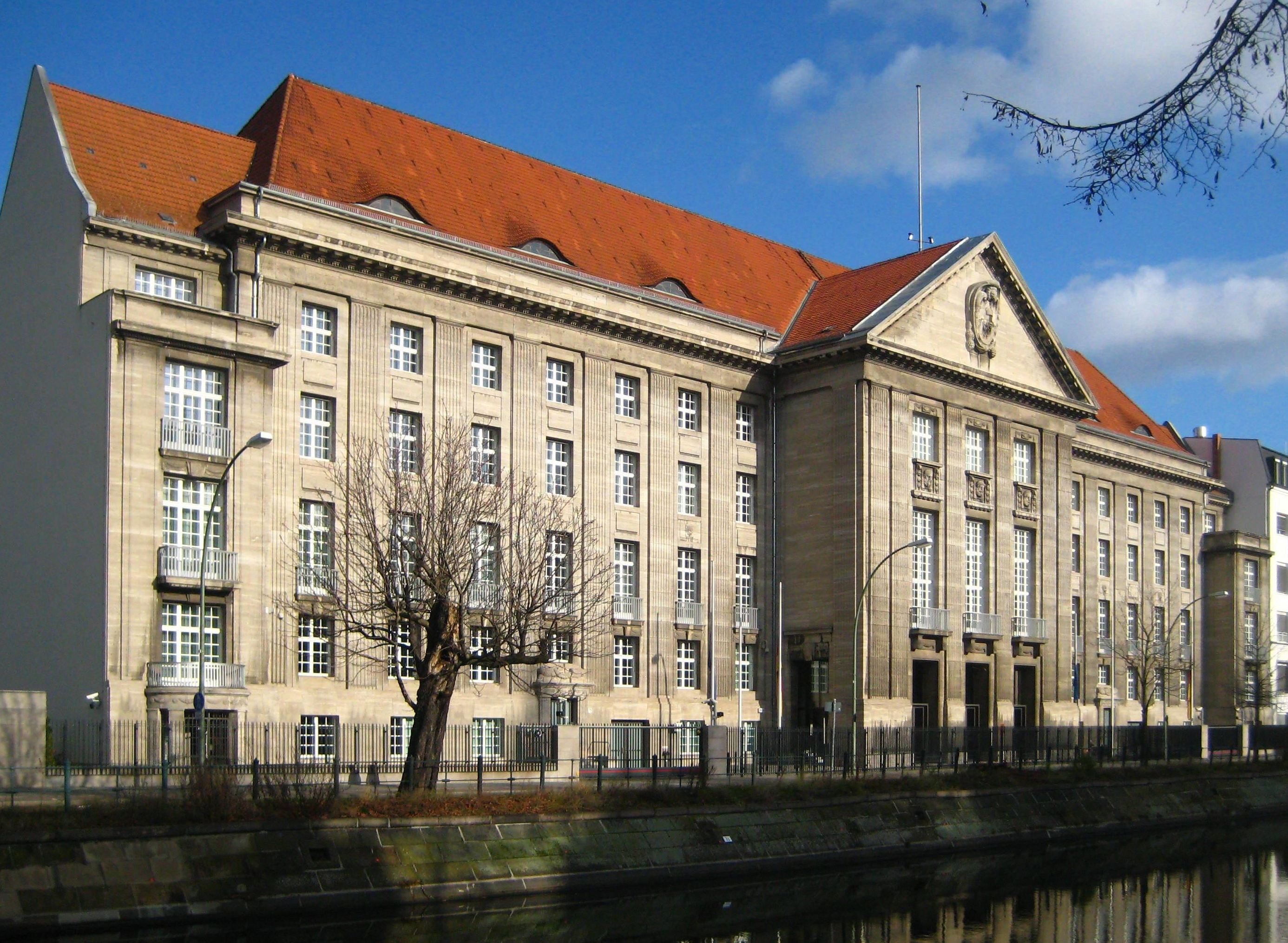
- South facade on Landwehr Canal

General information
- Architectural style: Neoclassical
- Location: Stauffenbergstraße 13, 10785 Berlin, Germany
- Coordinates: 52.5069°N 13.3614°E
- Current tenants: Bundeswehr; BMVg
- Year built: 1911–1914

Design and construction
- Known for: Resistance memorial, role in 20 July plot

Website
- gdw-berlin.de

The Bendlerblock (German pronunciation: [ˈbɛndlɐˌblɔk]) is a building complex in the Tiergarten district of Berlin, Germany, located on Stauffenbergstraße (formerly named Bendlerstraße). Erected in 1914 as the headquarters of several Imperial German Navy (German: Kaiserliche Marine) offices, it served the Ministry of the Reichswehr after World War I. Significantly enlarged under Nazi rule, it was used by several departments of the Oberkommando der Wehrmacht (OKW) from 1938, especially the Oberkommando des Heeres and the Abwehr intelligence agency.

The building is notable as the headquarters of a resistance band of Wehrmacht officers who staged the 20 July plot against Adolf Hitler in 1944. As the leaders of the conspiracy were summarily shot in the courtyard, the Bendlerblock also includes the Memorial to the German Resistance. Since 1993, the building complex has served as a secondary seat of the German Federal Ministry of Defence.

== Name ==
The complex got its name from the street it was on. Today, it is on Stauffenbergstraße (named in honour of Claus von Stauffenberg) which was previously known as Bendlerstraße from 1837 until 20 July 1955, after Johann Christoph Bendler (1789–1873) from Hoym in Prussian Halberstadt. Bendler, a chief mason and member of the Berlin city council, had acquired large estates south of the Großer Tiergarten park in order to develop the later mansion district on Tiergartenstraße.

== History ==
The main building on the Landwehr Canal was erected between 1911 and 1914 in a neoclassical style as the seat of the Imperial Naval Office, until 1916 led by Grand admiral Alfred von Tirpitz. It was also the headquarters of the Imperial Admiralty Staff and the Imperial Navy Cabinet directly subordinate to Emperor Wilhelm II.

=== Weimar Republic ===
After World War I, the German Weimar government had to face the regulations of the 1919 Versailles treaty, whereafter the remaining Reichswehr and Reichsmarine forces had to be greatly reduced and from that time on used the complex jointly. It also served as the seat of the first Reichswehr Minister Gustav Noske and supreme army commander Walther Reinhardt.

In Minister Noske's office, Truppenamt chief Major General Hans von Seeckt openly rejected an intervention of Reichswehr troops against paramilitary Freikorps forces during the 1920 Kapp Putsch ("Reichswehr do not fire on Reichswehr").

=== Nazi rule ===
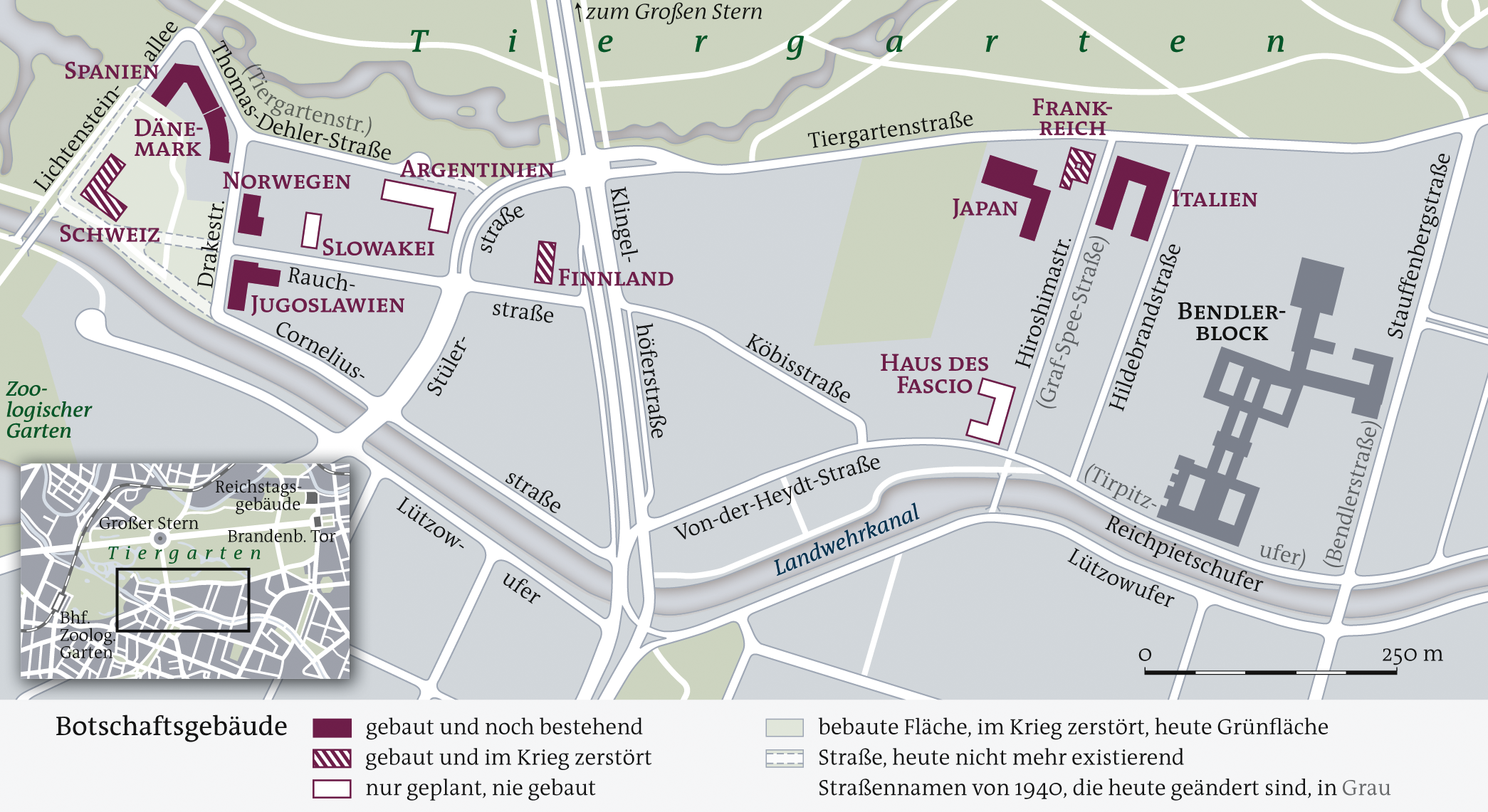
Tiergarten quarter in 1938, Bendlerblock on the right

On 3 February 1933, four days after his appointment by Reich President Paul von Hindenburg, Chancellor Adolf Hitler sought the support of Reichswehr commander-in-chief General Kurt von Hammerstein-Equord, unveiling his political ideology in an extended declamation. Despite the support by new Reichswehr Minister Werner von Blomberg, Hitler's appearance resulted in a grave crisis with the army command and Hammerstein-Equord's resignation in December. He was succeeded by Lieutenant General Werner von Fritsch.

From the mid-1930s onwards, large annexes were erected along Bendlerstraße according to plans designed by Wilhelm Kreis. From 1938 the enlarged "Bendlerblock" again was used by the Seekriegsleitung (Maritime Warfare Command) of the Oberkommando der Marine and the OKW Amt Abwehr. The main building served the General Army Office of the Oberkommando des Heeres (OKH) under General Friedrich Fromm, succeeded by General Friedrich Olbricht in 1940, and still as seat of the commander-in-chief of the German Army (Heer). After the Blomberg–Fritsch Affair in 1938, Colonel-general Walther von Brauchitsch took command and from 1941 Hitler took command himself.

Already in 1938, the head of the Abwehr intelligence agency under Admiral Wilhelm Canaris and Lieutenant Colonel Hans Oster evolved plans for a coup d'état in the course of the German occupation of Czechoslovakia. These plans were upset by the Munich Agreement, whereby the major European powers reconciled by permitting the annexation of the "Sudetenland".

=== 20 July plot ===
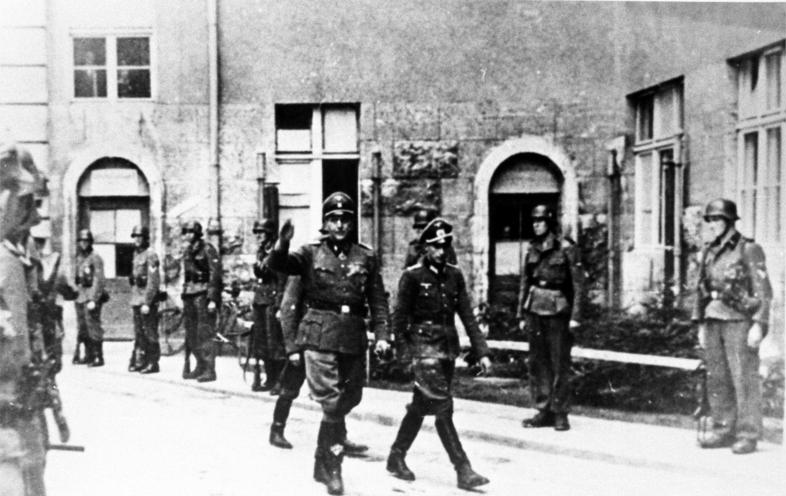
Waffen-SS officer Otto Skorzeny enters the Bendlerblock, July 1944

In the early 1940s, the OKH Army Office under the leadership of General Friedrich Olbricht became the focus of military resistance to the Nazi regime. In October 1943, Colonel Claus von Stauffenberg was transferred to the General Army Office as chief of staff.

It was at the Bendlerblock that Stauffenberg and Major General Henning von Tresckow secretly modified the Wehrmacht "Operation Valkyrie" plan for the suppression of a possible revolt into a scheme for a coup attempt upon an assassination of Hitler. Stauffenberg's position gave him direct access to situation briefings in Hitler's Wolf's Lair headquarters in East Prussia. On 20 July 1944, he set the fuse of a bomb there and immediately returned to Berlin.

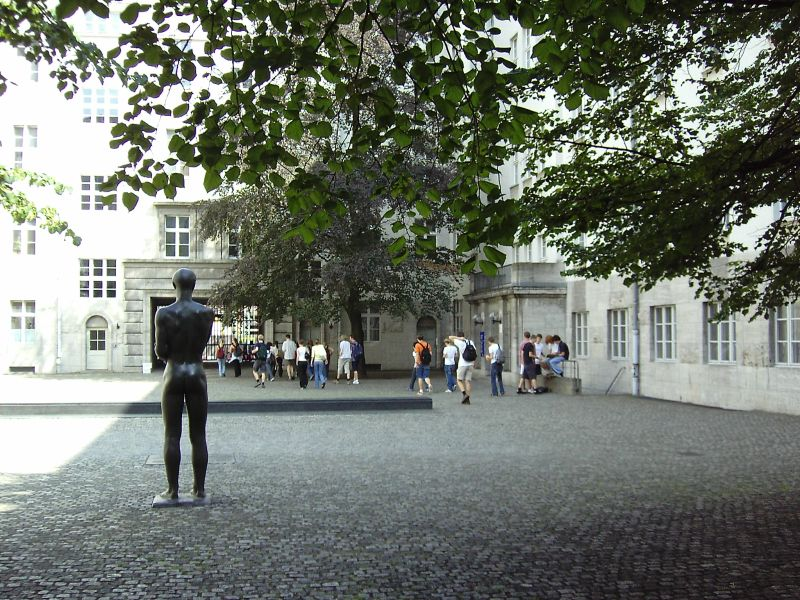
The courtyard where the 20 July conspirators were executed in July 1944

The bomb went off, but Hitler survived. As the day progressed and the news spread, the conspirators were unable to take control of Germany. Following their arrest in the Bendlerblock by order of General Friedrich Fromm, the resistance fighters Colonel von Stauffenberg, General Friedrich Olbricht, Albrecht Mertz von Quirnheim, and Stauffenberg's adjutant Werner von Haeften, were executed by firing squad that same night in the courtyard of the building. A fifth plotter, Generaloberst Ludwig Beck, was allowed to shoot himself. Fromm's opportunism did not pay off: he was arrested for connivance the next day, condemned to death and executed on 12 March 1945.

During the Battle of Berlin in the last days of World War II in late April and early May 1945, General Helmuth Weidling, commander of the Berlin Defence Area, used the Bendlerblock as his headquarters before surrendering to General Vasily Chuikov of the Soviet Red Army at 6:00 a.m. on 2 May.

=== Post-war era ===
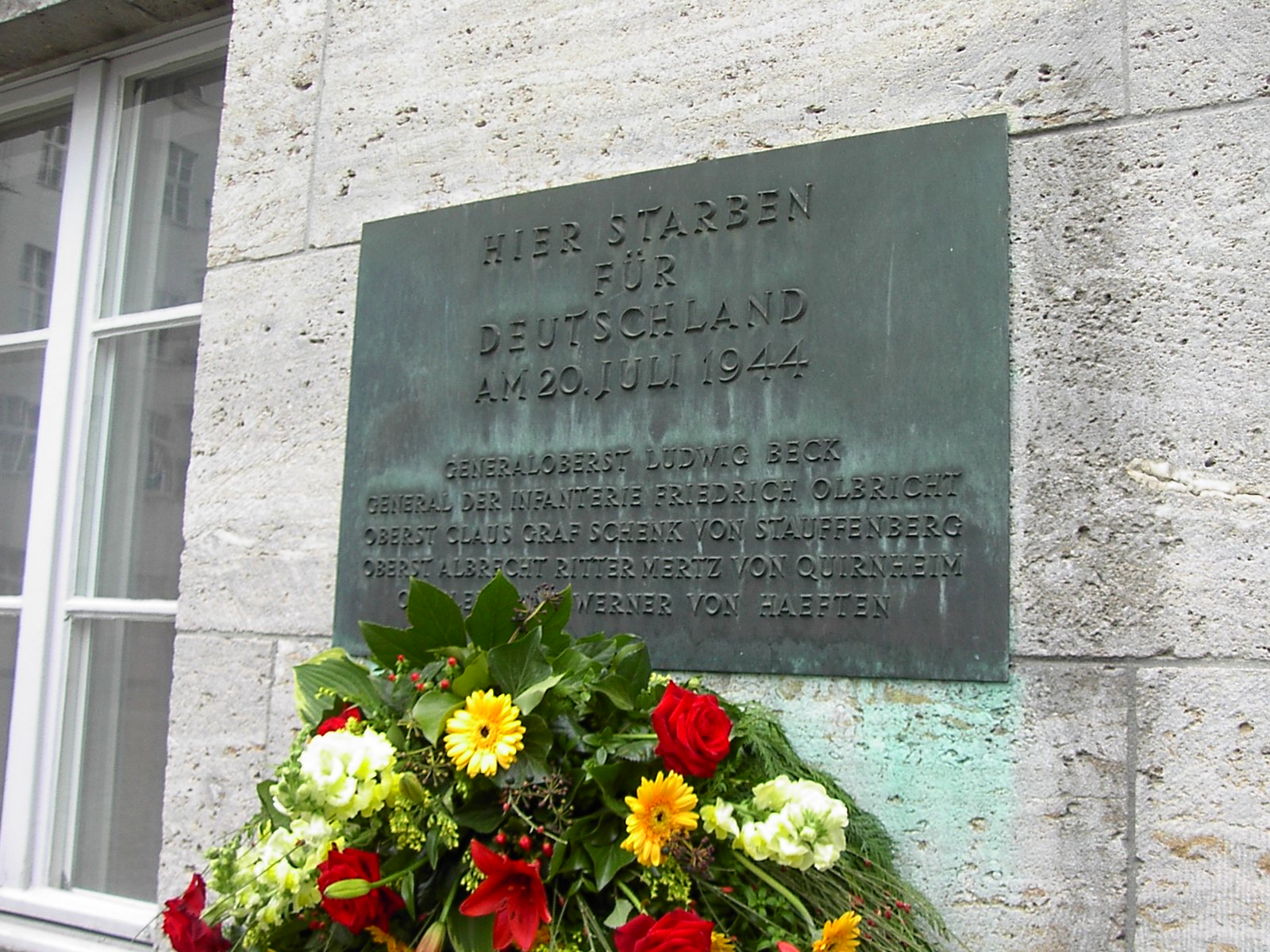
Memorial to the German Resistance, the inner courtyard near where von Stauffenberg and others were executed

The section of the Bendlerblock around the courtyard, where Stauffenberg and the other conspirators were executed, now houses the Memorial to the German Resistance. It is also used as one of the ceremonial sites where new members of the Wachbataillon of the Bundeswehr (German military's drill unit) take their oaths.

Following German reunification, the Federal Minister of Defence's Berlin office was moved to the Bendlerblock.

On 27 August 2025, the government of Chancellor Friedrich Merz held its first cabinet meeting at the Bendlerblock.

== Use in filming ==
The Ministry of Defence as proprietor tends to restrict access to the Bendlerblock, due to its historical significance and lingering sensitivities about Germany's role in World War II. Filming permission was first granted in 2003 to a TV studio for the filming of Stauffenberg, starring Sebastian Koch. It was awarded with the Deutscher Fernsehpreis.

The Ministry hesitated to grant permission for filming scenes of the Tom Cruise-starred movie Valkyrie about the 20 July Plot, especially a re-enactment of the execution on the original location. However, permission was eventually granted, and filming took place. Director Bryan Singer led the film crew in a minute of silence before filming began, in honour of those who were killed on the site in 1944.
