= Astro Boy (soundtrack) =

Astro Boy (Original Motion Picture Soundtrack)

Film score by John Ottman
- Released: October 20, 2009
- Recorded: 2009
- Studio: Abbey Road Studios, London
- Genre: Film score
- Length: 63:01
- Label: Varèse Sarabande
- Producer: John Ottman

John Ottman chronology
Orphan (2008)	Astro Boy (2009)	The RRF in New Recruit (2010)

Astro Boy (Original Motion Picture Soundtrack) is the film score to the 2009 film Astro Boy directed by David Bowers, which is loosely based on the manga series of the same name. The score is composed by John Ottman and released through Varèse Sarabande on October 20, 2009.

== Production and composition ==
John Ottman composed the film score. David Bowers wanted a modern score that had a classical feel to it, and when he listened to Ottman's music, he felt that suited what Bowers intended for the music. The two of them met together and discussed about their musical understanding and the type of music he wanted for this film. When Ottman was hired, Bowers would often discuss with him about the musical style that demanded a huge orchestra and choir, something that resembled John Williams-style of score, to represent that heroic feel.

Ottman enjoyed working on the film as it provided him scope to work on "something light-hearted and endearing" in contrast to the action and horror genres. He had to find a theme that suited Toby's character, which was emotional and innocent, but also to be heroic. The reference of Pinocchio laid the foundation for Astro Boy's main theme "Astro Flies" as the character discovers his powers and flies for the first time.

According to Ottman, working on animated films provide freedom to be more overt and literal with the characters musically, and had given several motifs for the characters. The complete album was culmination of motifs that allowed to narrate the story. The Astro Boy theme is derived the melancholic motif that used for self-reflection. His father Tenma's theme consisted of solo French horn and woodwinds. The motif for the robotic dog, Trashcan, was considered Ottman's favorite, as it utilized a duet of staccato clarinets and anvil sounds, while President Stone's theme was characterised with a militaristic riff accompanied with bassoons, bass clarinets, bass drum and cymbal, and then derives into the Peacekeeper theme which was a "big, brassier version as this robot sort of becomes an extension of President Stone". For the robot Zog, a six-note melody was written through French horns providing an ancient and noble feel.

Hamegg's theme featured an Italian-flavored melody that used pizzicato strings, mandolin, accordion and solo clarinet. Ottman also wrote a fun theme for the "RRF" robots, which had a pirate-styled music featuring muted trumpets and piccolos. The theme "Cora's Call", written for Cora, utilizes a recorder and warm strings for reflecting the sensitivity of the character. The Blue Core theme was "a magical and benevolent choral melody" that surrounded Astro Boy's and the robots' power elements. The choir elements within the celli hinted Astro's theme. For the red core, which was the unstable energy source, Ottman used male choir over the female choir. Pieces of the blue core and red core were momentarily present in the album, while the main iteration of the cores had been reduced due to time constraints.

The recording sessions were held at the Abbey Road Studios in London. More than 90 minutes of score had been written which had been recorded within a five-day period. Despite the time constraints and managing difficulties, Ottman noted that the music team helped him for the sessions and the recording engineer Casey Stone also assembled the cues for recording. Ottman admitted that his and the director's parents and few of his friends visited the studio to watch the recording.

== Track listing ==
No.	Title	Length
1.	"Opening Theme"	2:04
2.	"Astro Flies!"	3:14
3.	"Start It Up"	3:57
4.	"Morning Lessons"	1:50
5.	"Blue Core Pursuit"	3:58
6.	"Designing Toby"	4:48
7.	"I Don't Want You"	1:22
8.	"One Of Us / Meeting Trashcan"	2:29
9.	"I Love Robots / Hamegg's Story"	2:21
10.	"The RRF / New Friends"	2:58
11.	"Reviving Zog"	1:59
12.	"Reluctant Warrior"	4:44
13.	"Cora's Call"	2:27
14.	"Undercover Robots"	0:51
15.	"Egg On Hamegg"	3:29
16.	"Toby's Destiny"	4:31
17.	"Saving Metro City"	3:48
18.	"Final Sacrifice"	2:47
19.	"Robot Humanity"	3:23
20.	"Theme From Astro Boy"	4:34
21.	"Robots Are Our Friends Infomercial" (bonus track)	1:27
Total length:		63:01

== Reception ==
Thomas Glorieux of Maintitles noted that "the powerful music is just too good to dismiss and with a heroic theme that is destined to become of the best of this year, a score goes a long way in capturing your good old spirited mechanical or biological heart." Jonathan Broxton of Movie Music UK called it as "one of the most impressive, purely enjoyable Ottman scores for quite some time" and further added "the performances by the London Symphony Orchestra are superb, the themes are strong and memorable, and the simple, straightforward, heroic emotions are a great deal of fun."

James Southall of Movie Wave wrote "For sure, it's undemanding and doesn't present anything which hasn't been heard before – but Ottman is so enthusiastic it's very easy to just go with the flow and enjoy the ride." Christian Clemmensen of Filmtracks wrote "Ottman has sometimes produced robust action music without a convincing heart in the past, but his impressive creation for Astro Boy is both resoundingly cohesive and emotionally satisfying." Manohla Dargis of The New York Times and Kirk Honeycutt of The Hollywood Reporter "enjoyable" and "enticing". Tim Grierson of Screen International called it a "memorable" score.

== Personnel ==
Credits adapted from liner notes:

- Music composer and producer – John Ottman
- Recording and mixing – Casey Stone
- Mastering – Dave Collins
- Score editor – Amanda Goodpaster
- Technical score engineer – Lewis Jones, Roxy Pope
- Assistant technical engineer – Sam Okell
- Music supervisor – Todd Homme
- Music librarian – Dave Hage
- Copyist – Jo Ann Kane Music Services USA
- Executive producer – Robert Townson, David Bowers, Maryann Garger

Orchestra

- Supervising orchestrator – Rick Giovinazzo
- Additional orchestrations – Frank Macchia, Jason Livesay, Jeffrey Schindler, John Ashton Thomas, Kevin Kliesch, Larry Groupé
- Orchestra leader – Thomas Bowes
- Conductor – Jeffrey Schindler
- Contractor – Isobel Griffiths
- Assistant contractor – Charlotte Matthews

Choir

- Adult choir – Metro Voices
- Children's choir – Choristers Of Reigate St. Mary
- Choirmaster – Jenny O'Grady
- Bass vocals – Michael Dore
- Soprano vocals – Ann De Renais, Sarah Eyden

Instruments

- Accordion – Mark Bousie
- Cello – Jonathan Williams
- Clarinet – Nicholas Bucknall
- Double bass – Allen Walley, Roger Linley, Steve Mair
- Flute – Karen Jones
- French horn – Mark Wood
- Piano – Dave Arch
- Trombone – Lindsay Shilling, Richard Edwards
- Trumpet – Andy Crowley
- Viola – Bruce White, Rachel Bolt
- Violin – Mark Berrow, Patrick Savage
