= Johannes Tuchel =

German political scientist

- Born: 20 December 1957 (age 68); Hamburg, West Germany
- Occupations: Political scientist University professor Writer
- Known for: Chief executive, German Resistance Memorial Centre

Johannes Tuchel (born 20 December 1957) is a German political scientist. He was head of the German Resistance Memorial Centre (GDW) museum and chief executive of the foundation responsible for it.

== Life ==
Tuchel was born in Hamburg. Between 1977 and 1981 he studied political science at University of Hamburg and at the Free University of Berlin (FU Berlin) where in 1989 he received his doctorate in political science. His dissertation Concentration Camps: Organisational and Operational History of the Concentration Camp Inspectorate 1934-1938 (Konzentrationslager: Organisationsgeschichte und Funktion der "Inspektion der Konzentrationslager" 1934-1938) formed the basis for what became a standard work on concentration camps in Nazi Germany.

While preparing to submit his dissertation, Tuchel worked as a research assistant at the GDW from 1983 to 1987. Between 1988 and 1991 he was employed on memorial presentation by the Berlin senate. From 1991 to 2025 he headed up the GDW. Since 1992 he has simultaneously held a teaching post at the Otto Suhr Political Sciences Institute at the FU Berlin, being promoted to the status of Privatdozent in 2001, and becoming Professor for Political and Social Sciences at the Free University in 2007.

As both an author and an editor-compiler, Tuchel has published various books and other contributions on the resistance to National Socialism and the Nazi concentration camp network.
