= Valkyrie (soundtrack) =

Film score by John Ottman
- Released: December 23, 2008
- Genre: Film score
- Length: 1:03:27
- Label: Varèse Sarabande
- Producer: John Ottman

John Ottman chronology
The Invasion (2007)	Valkyrie (2008)	Orphan (2009)

Valkyrie (Original Motion Picture Soundtrack) is the score album to the 2008 film of the same name directed by Bryan Singer and stars Tom Cruise. John Ottman composed the film's musical score in his fifth collaboration with Singer after Lion's Den (1988), Public Access (1993), The Usual Suspects, (1995) Apt Pupil (1998), X2 (2003) and Superman Returns (2006).

Ottman initially edited the film without a temp score, and while composing, he decided to keep the score as minimal, but decided against it as the film needed music for a thriller atmosphere. He composed slow-paced themes, to accommodate the film's dialogues and had minimalised percussion instruments without using trumpets and drums. He wrote an original song "They'll Remember You", the opening track for the film's score album and featured in the end credits, that is based on Johann Wolfgang von Goethe's poem "Wanderer's Nightsong". The album concludes with Adagio for Strings inspired theme "Long Live Sacred Germany".

Varèse Sarabande released the film's soundtrack in the United States on December 23, 2008 and in Germany on January 22, 2009, coinciding with the theatrical release in the country. Rambling Records released the soundtrack in Japan on March 4. The opening track of the score album was positively received, but the rest of the score received mixed response, with criticism on the writing and undistinguished themes.

== Development ==
As with his previous collaborations with Bryan Singer on The Usual Suspects, Superman Returns and X2, editor and composer John Ottman edited the film without a temp track, noting if the film was working well without music, it was becoming a strong product. He initially planned to compose a minimal score to Valkyrie, but found that despite the film's dialogue-heavy nature, the film needed music to create a thriller atmosphere. Ottman described the new approach, "It's very much like Usual Suspects—in order to keep the tension going in a scene where there's really a lot of dialogue, we had to rely on a lot of score. But the score is done in a very sort of pulsating, subliminal way. It's not an expository score, it's more like a running pulse going through the movie."

Singer applied an imaginary metronome, "which only began clicking" when he watched scenes where the pace was becoming faster. He had a specific theme he wanted for the film, which was more modern than "The Winds of War"-type score he expected Ottman to do. Another challenge in composing thriller music was that the score needed to "slowly lapse" into the tragedy of the film's ending. The finished score has some percussion instruments and few brass, but no snare drums or trumpets, which were the conventions Singer and Ottman avoided.

Ottman had to compose music for the North African battle before the scene was shot, because booking space to record film music is difficult. Although he found that composing music based on the script results in overlong pieces, he felt the music worked out fine for the sequence. The film's end credits piece, "They'll Remember You", is an original composition, but the lyrics were based on the poem "Wanderer's Nightsong" by German poet Johann Wolfgang von Goethe. An end piece entitled "Long Live Sacred Germany" was inspired by Adagio for Strings, in the sense it would not feel like film music tailored to every moment in the scene, but still fit with what was going on. Ottman described the original version of the track as a "three minute drone that I slowed down with these two Tuvan throat singers, the whole thing was this horribly dark, morbid piece [which] left you cold". Ottman composed a metallic motif for Hitler, which was formed by low strings and a piano cluster.

== Track listing ==
All tracks are written by John Ottman.

No.	Title	Length
1.	"They'll Remember You"	4:20
2.	"Operation Valkyrie"	5:11
3.	"What's This Really All About?"	3:44
4.	"Bunker Bust"	3:45
5.	"March 13 Attempt"	3:38
6.	"Midnight Waltz"	2:11
7.	"A Place To Change"	4:09
8.	"Seconds Lost"	3:34
9.	"Getting The Signature"	4:04
10.	"The Officer's Club"	2:37
11.	"The Way It Should Go"	3:24
12.	"If I Were That Man/To The Berghof"	2:21
13.	"I'm Sorry"	3:04
14.	"Important Call"	4:07
15.	"No More Indecision"	2:31
16.	"Olbricht Gives The Order"	3:18
17.	"Operation Terminated"	1:16
18.	"Long Live Sacred Germany"	6:13
Total length:		63:28

== Reception ==
The first cue from the film "They'll Remember You" received much positive critical reception. However, reviews were mixed for the rest of the score cues. Jonathan Broxton gave a mixed review, and saying "Valkyrie is an incredibly frustrating score, as it offers examples of the absolute best and the indifferently mediocre in Ottman's writing. The opening cue is so good, that one wish he had written it for a different movie – one which would have allowed him to explore this style of writing more thoroughly, and not made him abandon it in favor of the middling action and suspense music that permeates the rest of this album." Filmtracks.com wrote "Ottman finally does take advantage of the opportunity to write gripping and stirring music of weighty, romantic heart. Otherwise, however, the score is unremarkable, a considerable disappointment given the compelling script. A strong 30-minute album could have represented Valkyrie much better; at twice that length, you'll find yourself returning to only the superior opening and closing tracks."

In contrast, Soundtrack Beat gave four stars out of five and wrote "In spite of the fact that a large amount of music whispers, the soundtrack of Valkyrie contains some of the best moments of composer John Ottman. His music enhances the film, giving breath to the unseen actions and illustrating determination when the plot is initiated. All the way through the end of the film, the music works less in the foreground and more in the background, but it's always so carefully crafted and very much to the point." Main Titles wrote "the opening cue ranks at the top of the list for best cue of 2008. There were also three other cues "Midnight Waltz", "The Officer's Club", and "Long Live Sacred Germany" that merit further listens. That said, with a liking for one or more of the underscore cues you've a winner."

== Accolades ==
John Ottman was nominated by the Academy of Science Fiction, Fantasy & Horror Films for the Saturn Award for Best Music at the 35th Saturn Awards. But lost to Hans Zimmer and James Newton Howard for The Dark Knight. He won the BMI Film & TV Awards for Best Film Music, and two nominations at the International Film Music Critics Association Awards: Best Original Score for a Fantasy/Science Fiction/Horror Film and Film Music Composition of the Year, losing both awards to Howard for The Happening and Michael Giacchino for his composition "Roar! (Cloverfield Overture)" from Cloverfield.
