= Command and obedience in the Bundeswehr =

The principle of command and obedience in the Bundeswehr (German: Befehl und Gehorsam), along with the concept of "citizens in uniform" (German: Staatsbürger in Uniform), was central to the 1953 idea of "leadership development and civic education" (official translation of German: Innere Führung). The revised definition of military orders and obedience, as well as superior–subordinate relations by the former "Amt Blank" (Blank Agency, predecessor of the Federal Ministry of Defence), was a 1950s result of Nazi German excesses. Central aims were the reduction of power to command by superiors and a shared responsibility for obedience by subordinates.

== Military orders ==
A military order is defined in § 2 (2) of the German military penal law (German: Wehrstrafgesetz, WStG) as an:

- instruction for a defined behavior (Anweisung zu einem bestimmten Verhalten)
- given by a military superior to his subordinate
- in written, oral or other form (for example, signals or signs)
- generally, or in a single case
- with claim of obedience (Anspruch auf Gehorsam).

An instruction might be a military order, if a soldier was a defined military superior by the Ministerial Directive Governing Superior-Subordinate Relations (German: Vorgesetztenverordnung). If an order was given by someone not a military superior, it would be juridically called a "military non-order" (without claim of obedience). Fundamentally, a superior is responsible for his orders and obligated to implement his instructions. He may only give orders concerning official aims and respecting international and national laws and the general directives issued by the Ministry. He is fundamentally responsible for the consequences of his orders. Whenever possible, military orders should include a description of the task and its aim. This is known as Auftragstaktik, and would enable subordinates to act to achieve the order's aim in changed circumstances.

== Superior–subordinate relations ==
The command relationships in the Bundeswehr are defined in the Ministerial Directive Governing Superior–Subordinate Relations (official translation of German: Verordnung über die Regelung des militärischen Vorgesetztenverhältnisses, abbreviated Vorgesetztenverordnung (VorgV)). These service regulations were decreed March 19, 1956, shortly before the first soldiers joined the newly founded Bundeswehr, and went into effect June 7, 1956. They were modified by decree October 7, 1981. The Vorgesetztenverordnung applies only to Bundeswehr soldiers and does not apply to civilian personnel of the Bundeswehr. Superior–subordinate relations of civilian Bundeswehr members (as well as military–civilian or civilian–military superior–subordinate relations) are defined by other regulations and ordinances. The content of the Vorgesetztenverordnung is one of the first things that recruits are required to learn.

=== Superior positions ===
§§ 1-3 VorgV concern the assignment of a superior. It is possible for a soldier to be superior to another in several ways. The following types of superiors are defined:

Who?	Whom?	When?	What?	Remarks
§ 1 Immediate superior (German: Unmittelbarer Vorgesetzter, general commanding position)
Leader of a military unit (platoons, companies, battalions, divisions and so forth)	Soldiers of his unit	Superior: always; Subordinate: always	Everything the general order authorization will include	Immediate superiors are urged not to interfere in professional affairs (see § 2 VorgV)
Example: squad leader → soldiers of his squad Note: Superiorship according to this paragraph - somewhat confusingly called "immediate" - is the entire chain of command known from other armies, and usually consists of a team (Trupp) leader, a squad (Gruppe) leader, a platoon (Zug) leader, a company "chief", a bataillon or regimental commander, a brigade commander, a division commander, a corps commander (until the 1990s), the commander of the troops of the respective branch of service, the "inspector" of the respective branch of service, the "Inspector General" (chief of staff; only since 2012, even though he was even previously recognized as the highest-ranking soldier) and the Minister of Defence. President and, outside a state of defence, Chancellor are not superiors, even though they are to be saluted. It is quite acceptable to bypass the team-leader and, after basic training when no direct military field training issues are concerned, also the squad leader and deal immediately with the platoon leader.
§ 2 Professional superior (German: Fachvorgesetzter, special commanding position)
Assignment holder, who is responsible for the professional service of a unit/office	For professional-service subordinate soldiers	Superior: on duty; Subordinate: on duty	Only for professional purposes	These assignments are only defined for the medical service, geographic information service (MILGEO) and military music service. Usually, the professional leader in a military unit/office is not the same as the immediate superior (§ 1 VorgV) of it.
Example: Admiralarzt der Marine (admiral surgeon of the navy) → military physicians and medical soldiers of the navy, concerning medical affairs
§ 3 Superior due to a special assignment (German: Vorgesetzter mit besonderem Aufgabenbereich, special commanding position)
Holder of a special defined assignment or function	Service-regulated or instruction-defined subordinate soldiers	Superior: on duty; Subordinate: always	Everything necessary for task fulfillment	Such assignments or functions (which are associated with special task responsibilities) are defined in general service regulations or special working instructions. In some cases, it might be possible that a lower rank is defined as superior to a higher rank.
Guard post: superior to passing soldiers due to the special defined assignment (§ 3 VorgV) Examples: Training sergeant → trainee (also when he has an officer rank; relationship must be defined in a special working instruction); Kompaniefeldwebel (coll. "Spieß", comparable to a First Sergeant) → soldiers of the same unit with ranks up to Hauptfeldwebel in indoor duty affairs (generally defined in Central Service Regulations); Guard soldier → all soldiers within the guard responsibility area, even those who are his direct superiors (§1) in normal service, except his guard-service-superiors (the superiors within the guard platoon itself, with the officer of the guard at top; and then, e.g., the barracks commandant; the commander of the battalion stationed in the barracks; and the latter's direct superiors); Feldjäger on duty → other soldiers; Truppenarzt (military physician, responsible for health care of a battalion/regiment) → patient (concerning treatment)
§ 4 Superior due to rank (or rank class/group) (German: Vorgesetzter aufgrund des Dienstgrades, general commanding position)
See also: German Army rank insignia
§ 4 (1) In companies of equivalents, as well as internal vessel crews
Officer ranks (OF-1 – OF-9)	NCO or private ranks (OR-1 – OR-9)	Companies: Superior: on duty; Subordinate: on duty; Vessels: Superior (when also § 1 superior and crew member): always; Superior (crew and non-crew members): always	Everything the general order authorization includes	
Unteroffizier mit Portepee (sergeant ranks, NCO OR-6 – OR-9)	Unteroffizier ohne Portepee and private ranks(OR-1 – OR-5)	Companies: Superior: on duty; Subordinate: on duty; Vessels: Superior (when also § 1 superior and crew member): always; Superior (crew and non-crew members): always	Everything the general order authorization includes	
Unteroffizier ohne Portepee ranks (OR-5)	Private ranks (OR-1 – OR-4)	Companies: Superior: on duty; Subordinate: on duty; Vessels: Superior (when also § 1 superior and crew member): always; Superior (crew and non-crew members): always	Everything the general order authorization includes	
§ 4 (2) In staffs and other units (differs from § 4 (1) VorgV)
Officer ranks (OF-1 – OF-9)	NCO or private ranks (OR-1 – OR-9)	Superior: on duty; Subordinate: on duty	Everything the general order authorization includes	May be reduced to parts of his unit/office by a disciplinary superior of a battalion or higher
§ 4 (3) Internal (enclosed military facilities)
Officer ranks (OF-1 – OF-9)	NCO and private ranks (OR-1 – OR-9)	Superior: always; Subordinate: always	Everything the general order authorization includes	"Enclosed military facilities" are barracks, office buildings and so on, posted with Militärischer Sicherheitsbereich (military security area) signs (not open-air training areas and so on).
NCO ranks (OR-5 – OR-9)	Private ranks (OR-1 – OR-4)	Superior: always; Subordinate: always	Everything the general order authorization includes	"Enclosed military facilities" are barracks, office buildings and so on, posted with Militärischer Sicherheitsbereich (military security area) signs (not open-air training areas and so on).
§ 5 Superior due to special order (German: Vorgesetzter aufgrund besonderer Anordnung; special commanding position)
Superior ordered by a higher superior, who is allowed to subordinate other soldiers to him	Subordinate soldiers	Superior: on duty; Subordinate: on duty	Everything necessary to fulfill the task	For the task, subordinate soldiers must be officially informed of the subordinate relationship. If essential, it might be possible to make a lower rank superior to a higher rank to fulfill a task.
Examples: Daily class duty in military schools is responsible to line the class for the roll call; Leader of a military marching formation is responsible for commanding a unit from A to B
§ 6 Superior due to own declaration (German: Vorgesetzter aufgrund eigener Erklärung; coll. "emergency paragraph")
Officer/NCO self-declared to superior	Present soldiers	Defined case must be given: Superior: always; Subordinate: always	All essential to clear the situation	Self-declaration to superior of an officer/NCO is only possible if: there is no higher rank on site; there is no §§ 1-3 or 5 superior on site; professional activities should be commanded by a qualified officer/NCO; one of the following cases prompts declaration of superior: situation needs emergency aid; immediate action is necessary for maintenance of discipline; uniform command at scene is required to clear a critical situation (although soldiers present are not hierarchically/organizationally associated)

Not mentioned in the Vorgesetztenverordnung, but recognized in practice (if rare), is "superiorship by consent of the subordinates": If no other superior is on site and either the situation is not an emergency, or none of those involved is at least an NCO (hence cannot use § 6), then the soldier with the highest rank on site or one of them if several can command if the others don't object. (An example for this would be a group of privates off duty who, for the fun of it and perhaps for training, get the idea to march in formation to the canteen rather than simply go to it; as a march in formation needs a leader, to do so one of them must take step in as leader to march them there.)

=== Contradictory orders ===
If a subordinate receives an order contrary to an already-received order (or one which defers substantially the achievement of its aim), he must inform the superior who gave the second order of this. On the basis of this knowledge, the second superior would have (due to his order) responsibility to verify the given order and decide whether or not the subordinate had to obey his order (instead of the first received order). The subordinate must obey the last given order, if the second one is not canceled; this is necessary because the second superior may have new information about a changed situation. If a subordinate has not been able to execute the first order (or to attain the expected aim) because of the second order, he must inform the first superior as soon as possible. The subordinate is immune from punishment by him, because the second superior is responsible for his order.

=== Prioritization (in opposing superior relationships) ===
It may be possible for two soldiers to be superior to each other due to differing paragraphs of the Vorgesetztenverordnung. For such situations the following prioritization of relationship importance is defined:

Superior by § 5 VorgV > § 3 VorgV > § 1 VorgV > § 2 VorgV > § 4 VorgV

§ 6 VorgV is excluded because a commissioned officer (or NCO) could only declare himself superior if there was no superior to him at the scene.

== Obedience and disobedience ==
=== Duty of obedience ===
Above all, subordinates must obey their superiors and must inform superiors of non-executed orders or unreached aims. Subordinates must execute military orders:

- with their best effort
- completely and
- immediately.

Although a superior must verify his orders, the recipient must also do so. First he would have to verify whether an instruction was given by a defined military superior according to the Vorgesetztenverordnung. If not, it would not be a military order with claim to obedience. If he executed this "military non-order", he would be responsible for possible consequences. If the instruction is given by a military superior, he must verify whether he must obey, may obey, or must refuse to obey. Generally he has to obey. He may but need not obey if the order has obviously no legitimate aim (e. g. "clean my boots" in usual situations), violates the soldier's own human dignity (e. g. "run into the city and shout that you are a fool"), or is unconscionable (e. g. obliges the soldier to spend amounts of his own money above limits mentioned in directives). He must not obey if the order violates others' human dignity, international law or consists of a crime (including a misdemeanor). Otherwise, subordinates are guilty of their deeds if their criminal character was obvious to them. Obviously unavoidable errors may remain unpunished.

Apart from that, it is not the soldier's job to investigate the entire legitimacy of the order; e. g. whether the not obviously lacking official aim actually existed, or whether non-penal laws or directives of the Ministry were complied with. In particular, a soldier must obey to commit a contravention. In these cases, the commanding superior has the entire responsibility for the act. It might, though, be comradely to bring an error to the superior's attention, and the soldier is not to be punished for doing so.

=== Penalties for disobedience and insubordination ===
Punishment for disobedience is regulated in the Wehrstrafgesetz (military penal law). Germany does not have any military courts; civilian courts have jurisdiction over military law. Subordinates who do not execute military orders with claim to obedience may be punished with imprisonment up to three years (in cases with "severe consequences" up to five years). "Severe consequences" means that the result of the disobedience either would have grave consequences for the security of Germany or for the combat worthiness of the forces, or that it caused death or severe bodily harm to another person. Insubordination is the oral or physical revolt against military orders or the denial (in spite of repetition) of an order, and may be punished with imprisonment up to three years. In case of an initial revolt against a military order, a court could withhold sentencing if the subordinate executed the order voluntarily and in time afterwards. If subordinates avoided executing orders frivolously, they could also be sentenced to imprisonment up to two years in cases of severe consequences.

== See also ==
- German military law
