= Valkyrie (film) =

2008 film by Bryan Singer

- Theatrical release poster
- Directed by: Bryan Singer
- Written by: Christopher McQuarrie; Nathan Alexander
- Produced by: Bryan Singer; Gilbert Adler; Christopher McQuarrie
- Starring: Tom Cruise; Kenneth Branagh; Bill Nighy; Tom Wilkinson; Carice van Houten; Thomas Kretschmann; Terence Stamp
- Cinematography: Newton Thomas Sigel
- Edited by: John Ottman
- Music by: John Ottman
- Production companies: Metro-Goldwyn-Mayer Pictures; United Artists; Bad Hat Harry Productions
- Distributed by: MGM Distribution Co.
- Release date: December 25, 2008 (United States)
- Running time: 121 minutes
- Country: United States
- Languages: English; German
- Budget: $75–90 million
- Box office: $201.5 million

Valkyrie (German: Walküre, as featured in the opening sequence) is a 2008 historical thriller film directed by Bryan Singer, written by Christopher McQuarrie and Nathan Alexander, starring Tom Cruise. The film is set in Nazi Germany during World War II and depicts the 20 July plot in 1944 by German army officers to assassinate Adolf Hitler and to use the Operation Valkyrie national emergency plan to take control of the country. The film was released by American studio United Artists and stars Cruise as Colonel Claus von Stauffenberg, one of the key plotters. The supporting cast includes Kenneth Branagh, Bill Nighy, Eddie Izzard, Terence Stamp, and Tom Wilkinson.

Cruise's casting caused controversy among German politicians and members of the von Stauffenberg family due to the actor's practice of Scientology, which is viewed with suspicion in Germany. Because of this, the filmmakers initially had difficulty setting up filming locations in Germany, but they were later given access to locations such as Berlin's historic Bendlerblock. German newspapers and filmmakers supported the film and its intention to spread global awareness of von Stauffenberg's plot.

The film changed release dates several times, from as early as June 27, 2008, to as late as February 13, 2009. The changing calendar and poor response to United Artists's initial marketing campaign drew criticism about the film's viability; following a positive test screening, Valkyrie's release in North America was ultimately changed to December 25, 2008, and it opened in Germany on January 22, 2009. United Artists renewed its marketing campaign to reduce its focus on Cruise and to highlight Singer's credentials. The film received mixed reviews from critics and grossed $201 million worldwide.

== Plot ==
During World War II, Wehrmacht Colonel Claus von Stauffenberg is serving in Tunisia on the staff of the 10th Panzer Division, where he becomes increasingly disillusioned with the future of Nazi Germany under Adolf Hitler. Stauffenberg loses his left eye, his right hand, and two fingers on his left hand in an air raid and is repatriated to Munich to recover.

Major-General Henning von Tresckow unsuccessfully attempts to assassinate Hitler with a time bomb during a visit to the Werwolf headquarters on the Eastern Front. Resistance member General Hans Oster is arrested by the Gestapo. Stauffenberg is recruited by General Friedrich Olbricht to take Oster's place in the German Resistance, which includes Tresckow, General Ludwig Beck, Dr. Carl Friedrich Goerdeler, and Field Marshal Erwin von Witzleben.

Stauffenberg rewrites the plans for Operation Valkyrie, the deployment of the Reserve Army in a state of emergency, as a means to dismantle the Nazi regime after assassinating Hitler. Stauffenberg's position in the Reserve Army grants him direct access to Hitler, who approves the redrafted plan. General Friedrich Fromm, the head of the Reserve Army, is offered a position as head of the Wehrmacht after the coup and although he agrees to remain silent on the offer, he declines to participate. General Erich Fellgiebel, head of communications at Hitler's headquarters, is convinced to participate in the plot.

On 15 July 1944, Stauffenberg attends a strategy meeting at the Wolf's Lair with a bomb, but does not receive permission to proceed as Heinrich Himmler is absent. Stauffenberg leaves and the Reserve Army, mobilised by Olbricht, is ordered to stand down. Fromm threatens Olbricht and Stauffenberg with arrest if they try to control the Reserve Army again. Stauffenberg berates the plotters for their indecisiveness. Goerdeler demands that Stauffenberg be relieved, but Beck informs him that the SS has issued a warrant for his arrest, and that he must leave the country immediately.

Stauffenberg returns to the Wolf's Lair on 20 July. Due to the warm weather, the conference is moved to an open-windowed summer barrack. Stauffenberg places a briefcase containing the bomb close to Hitler before leaving. Colonel Heinz Brandt moves the case behind a table leg. When the bomb explodes, Stauffenberg flees to Berlin, certain that Hitler is dead, not realizing the table leg shielded Hitler and the open conference room dispersed the blast.

Olbricht refuses to mobilise the Reserve Army without confirmation of Hitler's death but Colonel Albrecht Mertz von Quirnheim forges his authorization and initiates Valkyrie. The plotters order the arrest of Nazi Party leaders and SS officers, convincing lower officers that the Party and the SS are staging a coup, and soldiers begin to take control of the ministries. Rumors that Hitler survived the blast are dismissed by Stauffenberg as SS propaganda. Knowing Hitler is still alive, Fromm and General Joachim von Kortzfleisch refuse to join the plotters and are arrested.

Major Otto Ernst Remer of the Berlin Guard Battalion attempts to arrest Joseph Goebbels, who connects him by telephone to Hitler. Remer is convinced the Reserve Army has been duped and arrests the plotters inside the Bendlerblock.

To save himself, Fromm convenes an impromptu court-martial, permits Beck to commit suicide and condemns von Quirnheim, Olbricht, Werner von Haeften, and Stauffenberg to immediately face firing squad. Tresckow kills himself in a forest with a grenade; Witzleben, Goerdeler and eventually Fromm are hanged after show trials. This was the last of the 15 known attempts on Hitler's life before his own suicide. The film ends with a quotation from the German Resistance Memorial Center commemorating Stauffenberg and the other conspirators.

== Cast ==
German World War II Colonel von Stauffenberg (left) and actor Tom Cruise (right). Cruise was attracted to the role based on the resemblance of his profile to von Stauffenberg's.

- Tom Cruise as Colonel Claus von Stauffenberg, the German army Colonel who was instrumental in the conspiracy to assassinate Adolf Hitler: Bryan Singer saw von Stauffenberg as "very much a humanist", saying, "He understood his role as a colonel, but he also understood that the Nazis were doing terrible, terrible, terrible things." Having directed Superman Returns, Singer compared von Stauffenberg's dual identity as loyal colonel and conspirator to Superman and his civilian identity Clark Kent. Cruise had wanted to work with Singer since they met at the premiere for Mission: Impossible, and the actor was enticed by the script's background, the truth of which struck him as a surprise. The actor described von Stauffenberg's heroism: "I thought of it in terms of what [von] Stauffenberg represents. He was someone who realized that he had to take the steps that ultimately cost him his life. ... He recognized what was at stake." Cruise felt von Stauffenberg did not think of himself as a hero. The actor prepared for the role for eight months by hiring a researcher, studying history books, and speaking with some of von Stauffenberg's family. Since von Stauffenberg lost his left eye, right hand and two fingers on his left hand in an Allied attack in Tunisia, Cruise affected the same disabilities to practice dressing, moving items and writing. Cruise initially found the eyepatch difficult to work with but acknowledged that von Stauffenberg had to live with this discomfort.
- Kenneth Branagh as Major General Henning von Tresckow: Branagh differed physically from the real von Tresckow, who was balding, but Singer said, "if you look at [von] Tresckow's energy, he had an honesty that Branagh has."
- Bill Nighy as General of Infantry Friedrich Olbricht: Nighy was cast to give a sympathetic quality, so Olbricht would not be the "fall guy". Nighy wanted to convey Olbricht as conflicted between complaining about Hitler's regime and actually doing something about it. The actor described his portrayal, "One of the most disconcerting things imaginable is to put on a Nazi uniform. It's so associated with evil that it took me several days to get used to being in costume."
- Terence Stamp as Colonel General Ludwig Beck: Singer met Stamp to discuss playing a part in X-Men, having admired him for portraying General Zod in Superman II. Stamp endured the Blitz as a child and aided Singer in staging a scene where the von Stauffenbergs hide from Allied bombings. The actor described his approach to acting: he was not the sort of actor who puts on a mask; rather, he tries to find the place within himself that resonates with the characters he portrays saying that "There has to be a kind of non-judgmental discernment, so when I'm playing villains, they don't think they're particularly villains." Singer said of his direction of Stamp as the heroic and selfless Beck that he sought to find "the part of Terence that would be prepared to fall on his sword for certain ideals" just as Beck had in fact done after being arrested with his co-conspirators for treason.
- Tom Wilkinson as General Friedrich Fromm, the head of Germany's Reserve Army: Wilkinson was cast to make the treacherous Fromm sympathetic.
- Carice van Houten as Nina Schenk Gräfin von Stauffenberg, von Stauffenberg's wife: The filmmakers were impressed by her performance in Black Book, and argued she could give a strong performance with minimal dialogue. Screenwriter Nathan Alexander spoke to von Stauffenberg's relatives and noted that, although Nina and Claus never directly spoke about the plot, "in a sense it was all they talked about".
- Kevin McNally as Dr. Carl Friedrich Goerdeler, a German politician who intended to become chancellor of Germany after a successful coup
- David Schofield as Field Marshal Erwin von Witzleben, a retired general and one of the plotters: Singer and producer Christopher McQuarrie were impressed by Schofield's professionalism and dedication to show up on set for scenes without his character, and the filmmakers expanded his role as a result.
- Christian Berkel as Colonel Albrecht Ritter Mertz von Quirnheim, a plotter with knowledge of explosives
- Jamie Parker as Lieutenant Werner von Haeften, an adjutant to von Stauffenberg who helps the colonel carry out the plot
- Eddie Izzard as General of Signal Corps Erich Fellgiebel, a German signals officer and plotter, responsible for communications at Hitler's bunker Wolf's Lair
- David Bamber as Adolf Hitler, the Führer of Germany: During Bamber's audition for the role, Singer was struck by Bamber's eyes and stated that Bamber had a quality that resonated with Hitler.
- Thomas Kretschmann as Major Otto Ernst Remer, commanding officer of Großdeutschland guard battalion: Kretschmann was the original choice to play von Stauffenberg before Singer joined the production, when McQuarrie was intending to direct.
- Harvey Friedman as Dr. Joseph Goebbels, Minister of Propaganda and a member of Hitler's inner circle
- Kenneth Cranham as Field Marshal Wilhelm Keitel, the head of the OKW and a member of Hitler's inner circle
- Matthias Freihof as Reichsführer-SS Heinrich Himmler, the head of the SS and a member of Hitler's inner circle
- Waldemar Kobus as Wolf-Heinrich Graf von Helldorf, chief of the Berlin police who pledges his and men's assistance in carrying out the plot
- Halina Reijn as Margarethe von Oven, secretary in the Bendlerblock: Reijn co-starred with fellow Dutchwoman Carice van Houten in Black Book.
- Werner Daehn as Major Ernst John von Freyend
- Tom Hollander as Colonel Heinz Brandt
- Matthias Schweighöfer as Lieutenant Franz Herber
- Bernard Hill as a general working with von Stauffenberg during the Tunisian campaign: While he is not named in the film, the 10th Panzer Division's commander while von Stauffenberg was serving with it was Lieutenant General Wolfgang Fischer.
- Ian McNeice as the composite "Pompous General" who attempts to disrupt the coup headquarters: Though the general is not named in the film, McQuarrie and Alexander said the character was based on General Joachim von Kortzfleisch, who tried to disrupt the coup in the same fashion.
- Gerhard Haase-Hindenberg as Reichsmarschall Hermann Göring, chief of the Luftwaffe and a member of Hitler's inner circle.
- Anton Algrang as Albert Speer, Minister of Armaments and a member of Hitler's inner circle.
- Helmut Stauss as judge Roland Freisler
- Matthew Burton as Lieutenant General Adolf Heusinger
- Danny Webb as Captain Haans
- Chris Larkin as Sergeant Helm
- Philipp von Schulthess as Major General Henning von Tresckow's aide (likely based on Fabian von Schlabrendorff). The actor is the grandson of Claus von Stauffenberg.

Patrick Wilson was originally cast in Valkyrie but dropped out due to scheduling conflicts and other unspecified reasons. Stephen Fry was also offered a role in the film but was unable to participate.

Some of the non-German actors initially experimented with German accents, but Singer discarded the idea, instead instructing them to adopt neutral accents that "[wouldn't] distract from the story". Singer added he was not making a docu-drama and wanted to make the story engaging.

== Production ==
=== Development ===
In 2002, Christopher McQuarrie visited Berlin while researching another project and visited the memorial to von Stauffenberg at the Bendlerblock. Researching the 20 July plot, he was moved and fascinated by the fact that the conspirators were fully aware of what would happen if they failed their assassination attempt, and he wanted to make their story more well-known. He approached Nathan Alexander to co-write the film, and Alexander began researching the project. McQuarrie sought to model the story after the 2001 TV film Conspiracy, which depicted the Wannsee Conference at which the Nazis planned the Final Solution. (Branagh, McNally and McNeice had all starred in Conspiracy.) He also sought to direct the film, until he realized that adequate financing would only be secured with Bryan Singer directing.

After Singer completed the three major productions X-Men (2000), X2 (2003) and Superman Returns (2006), he sought a smaller project before embarking upon the eventually aborted sequel to Superman Returns. Singer and McQuarrie had often made World War II films in their backyards while growing up in New Jersey, and Singer had later dealt with Nazi subject matter in Apt Pupil and X-Men. Singer first learned of the plot in the early 1980s when his mother visited Bonn and met Freya von Moltke, widow of Helmuth von Moltke, a founder of the Kreisau Circle resistance group. After learning of McQuarrie and Alexander's screenplay and signing on to direct Valkyrie, Singer read The Rise and Fall of the Third Reich by William L. Shirer to gain deeper understanding of Nazi Germany's political landscape, and also met with one of Hitler's bodyguards, Rochus Misch, who was the last person to leave the bunker where Hitler committed suicide. The creative team acknowledged the ambiguity over the enigmatic von Stauffenberg's true motivation, but Singer and McQuarrie judged him to be a man of ethics just from what he did. Though McQuarrie sought for Valkyrie to be similar to Conspiracy, Singer had bigger ambitions for the film, wanting it to be more than "old men in rooms, talking". Singer looked back on his decision, saying: "The true story had all the makings of a classic assassination thriller. ... I knew if I could keep the audience with [von] Stauffenberg, with his mission, they would go with the flow and be less inclined to start hypothesising on things from history."

McQuarrie suggested they bring the project to United Artists partners Paula Wagner and Tom Cruise, who immediately agreed to finance the film in March 2007. Singer invited Tom Cruise to take the lead role, which Cruise accepted. Cruise had been provided a picture of von Stauffenberg, in which the actor noticed a similarity in his profile with the German colonel, drawing him to the role. The director and the screenwriter initially anticipated Valkyrie as a "small" film with a budget of under US$20 million and to be completed within several months, but Cruise's interest in playing von Stauffenberg made Singer realize his involvement could broaden the film's publicity and therefore its budget. The film's budget was then raised to $60 million. The director considered calling the film Operation Valkyrie, not wanting to use a generic action film title. The film's English-language title was ultimately titled Valkyrie because Singer felt that the film was about more than the operation and liked its connection to Wagner's music.

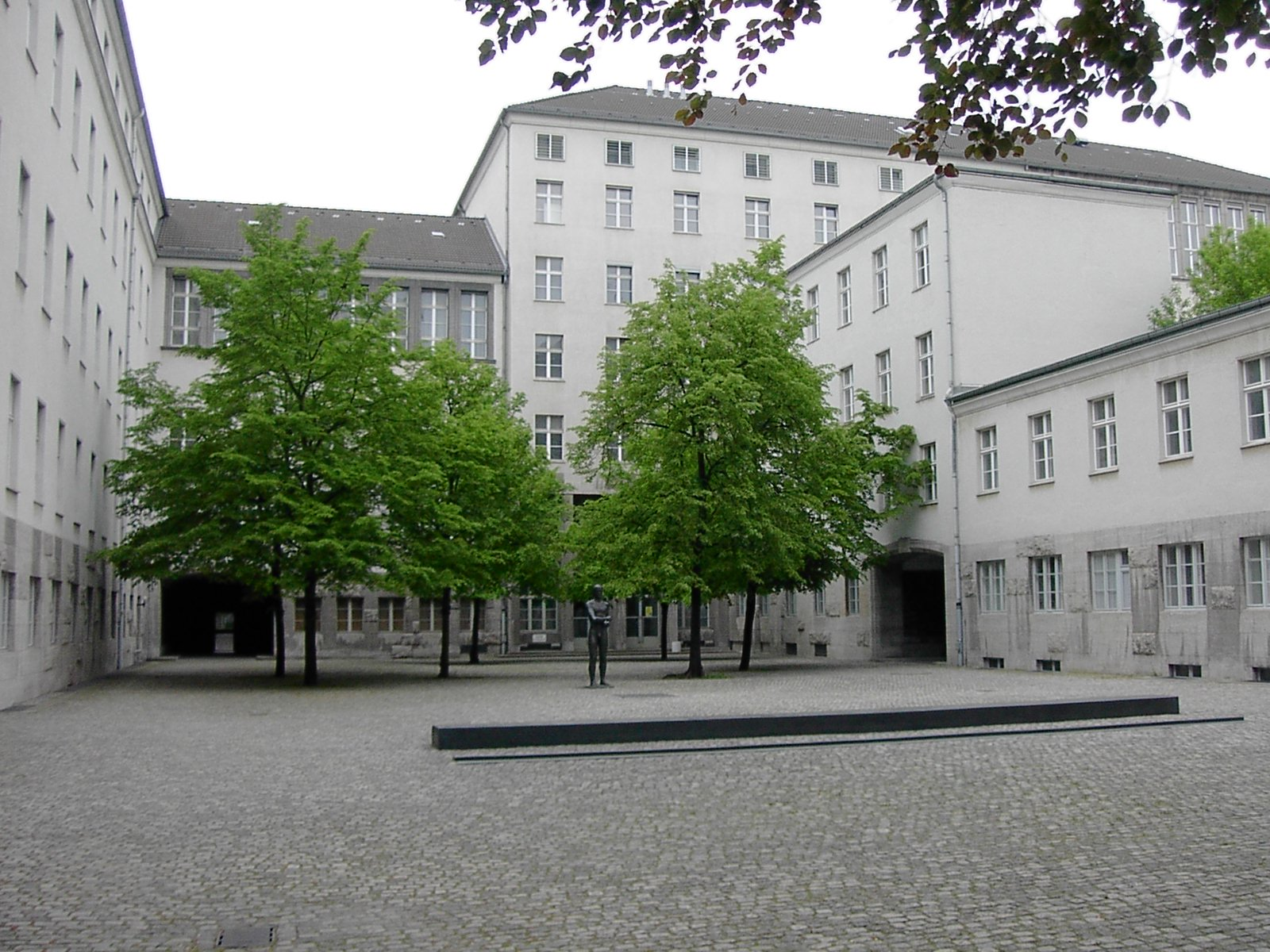
Bendlerblock, where the conspirators were executed in real life, was originally denied as a filming location for Valkyrie

Germany's Finance Ministry had originally denied the producers the right to film at Bendlerblock, explaining that the site should be treated as a "place of remembrance and mourning" which would "lose dignity if we were to exploit it as a film set". The producers were also denied a request to film at a Berlin police station by the department, citing adverse impact to the facility. The German government eventually had a change of heart concerning the Bendlerblock site and gave permission for filmmakers to film there. A United Artists spokesman said that they were "very grateful" for the decision, saying that the site "[had] always been important to us symbolically, creatively and for the sake of historical authenticity" and that the company had been in continuous talks with the German government in order to clear up any misconceptions about the nature of the film. The Memorial to the German Resistance also helped filmmakers by permitting them access to their materials and documents. German military pageantry was shaped by referring to the recorded material and input from military advisers.

=== Writing ===
McQuarrie and Alexander researched first-hand accounts, photos, newsreels and texts. They also examined Gestapo and SS records, as the organizations had been meticulous in reconstructing the events of the conspiracy in its aftermath. A timeline of events was created, from which McQuarrie and Alexander shaped the script. After production began in Berlin, the writers were able to visit locations and meet with relatives of the conspirators; these meetings informed changes made to the script during filming.

The initial scenes of von Stauffenberg in Tunisia were written to provide historical context to the rest of the film. The scenes were written with the intention of communicating the complexity of the situation—including references to the Holocaust—without being too obvious. The writers also wanted to evoke the spirit of the resistance and convey the ongoing disgust of the German officers. McQuarrie and Alexander found the most difficult task was in conveying the motives of the conspirators; von Stauffenberg especially remained an enigma, though the writers believed he and the other resistance members to be propelled by their moral outrage. McQuarrie and Alexander attempted to include a scene of von Stauffenberg's witnessing an atrocity, but because he was a supply officer he had little exposure to many of those that occurred. Though he witnessed some—such as the starvation of the Russians—they believed it difficult to dramatize von Stauffenberg's being compelled to action by "field reports". They also had difficulties with Hitler's portrayal; in researching his speeches, they struggled to find one in which he made overtly villainous statements.

=== Filming ===
Filming began on July 18, 2007, in Berlin. Production of Valkyrie was then estimated to have a budget of US$80 million, with two-thirds to be spent in Germany. The German Federal Film Fund issued €4.8 million (US$6.64 million) to United Artists to assist with production. The filmmakers received permission to film at Tempelhof International Airport's Columbia Haus, a former Nazi jail for political prisoners. Production also involved World War II planes with swastikas painted on the sides, practicing in the airspace above Brandenburg. Around 70 sets were built for the film. The filmmakers also shot on location at the former Reich Air Ministry Building and the exterior of the house at which von Stauffenberg stayed with his brother.

A replica set of Hitler's Eastern Front Headquarters Wolf's Lair was constructed 60 kilometers (37 mi) south of Berlin, though the headquarters' actual location was in modern-day northeastern Poland. It took twelve weeks to build. Filming took place in some of the houses that were used to hide the bombs in 1944. The interior of Hitler's Bavarian residence Berghof was replicated using film shot by Hitler's consort Eva Braun and designing models of furniture possessed by secretive collectors. The production also made use of surviving Nazi relics, including furniture used by the Reich Air Ministry and objects that once adorned Hitler's desk. Nazi symbols, the display of which is heavily restricted in Germany, were used at several locations; while the filmmakers gave forewarning to local residents, a passerby witnessing the use of swastikas during filming in Berlin filed an official complaint with the city. Similar charges were filed against the owners of sites set up to show Nazi displays for the film's production. Filming also took place at Babelsberg Studios. During filming on August 19, 2007, eleven people were hurt when the side panel of a truck they were riding broke, with one person requiring hospitalization. They demanded $11 million in compensation, rejecting a settlement offered by the studio.

Before filming the scene of von Stauffenberg's execution at Bendlerblock, Tom Cruise led the cast and crew in holding a moment of silence "out of respect for the place and out of respect for the life achievement of these people who were executed there", according to actor Christian Berkel. After filming of the scene was completed, the footage was sent to be developed for the post-production process at a processing plant in Germany. The wrong chemical was accidentally used in development, damaging some of the film and requiring the crew to seek permission from the government to re-shoot the scenes. Permission was granted and a spokesman for the film indicated the schedule and budget had not been affected.

Singer and cinematographer Newton Thomas Sigel chose different styles for the separate halves of the film. Elegant camerawork such as cranes were used for the build-up to the attempt on Hitler's life, while the second half is frantic with handheld cinematography as the plotters are hunted down. The colors in the film also become more intense as the story continues. Sigel focused on red, the color of the Nazi flag, which he felt represented the violence of their ideology. Singer looked towards thrillers of the 1940s and home movies shot by Eva Braun for inspiration. Shooting scenes at night was difficult because presenting the era accurately required blackouts. Sigel noted that, in real life, car headlights were used for the firing squad to aim at and execute the plotters in the Bendlerblock. Singer chose to shoot in 1:85 aspect ratio and, since filming took place in Germany, the director used Arriflex cameras with Zeiss lenses.

One Ju-Air Junkers Ju 52, registration HB-HOT, which crashed near Piz Segnas in the Swiss Alps on 4 August 2018, had been used for the filming.

The Tunisia battle sequence that opened the film was the last major sequence filmed. The filmmakers wanted to avoid the appearance that von Stauffenberg wanted to kill Hitler because of the injuries he suffered in the battle. They began a rough cut in October 2007 and, between then and June 2008, there were several test screenings without the battle sequence. By June 2008, the filmmakers felt that they knew how to adequately frame the characters when filming the battle sequence. Singer scouted Jordan and Spain for locations, but the candidates did not meet the aesthetic and economic criteria. The Cougar Buttes desert in California was ultimately chosen to represent Tunisia. Since the production budget was adjusted to provide visual effects to make von Stauffenberg's injuries realistic, not enough was left for solely computer-generated fighter planes. Singer instead used two P-40 Warhawks in the battle sequence. The budget increased in the course of production due to the filming in Germany, the rebuilding of sets, and lost shooting days, but German tax rebates tempered the growth. The studio reported its final production budget to be $75 million, but competing studios believed it to be closer to $90 million.

=== Visual effects ===
The film's visual effects were created by Sony Pictures Imageworks, who collaborated with Bryan Singer on Superman Returns. The company's two key goals were to accurately portray von Stauffenberg's injuries and to create a 1943 period look to Berlin. With many explosions and stunts seen in the film performed practically, the majority of the 800 computer-generated effects shots were used to portray von Stauffenberg's injuries. A digital version of Cruise's hand was designed, and technicians rotoscoped the hand in every movement it could make so the missing fingers were erased in the process. With many close-ups of von Stauffenberg's hand with missing fingers, the injuries were textured to look like actual scars, particularly based on surgical procedures from 1943. Cruise asked for advice on how to best move his hands so visual effects would be easier to apply, but some challenges, such as von Stauffenberg getting dressed on his own, were inescapable. According to supervisor Richard R. Hoover, "We know from historical accounts that von Stauffenberg didn't stick his hands in his pockets to try and hide his injuries."

For the battle sequence in North Africa, two real Curtiss P-40 Kittyhawks in Desert Air Force paint schemes were used, accompanied by cloned images of them or by computer-generated planes. In scenes showing squadrons of soldiers, digital extras were not used; instead, photography of real squadrons was cloned. Sony Pictures Imageworks also digitally expanded details on stage locations and at practical locations. The exterior of Hitler's Bavarian residence Berghof was digitally created, since little was left of the original structure, and the creation was superimposed on a shot of a ski area in Austria. In Berlin itself, city officials helped reduce the need for visual effects by removing power poles and modern lighting over the weekend when filming took place and restoring the equipment by the start of the new week.

There was widespread questioning in some corners of the press as to whether, in order to make himself look more muscular and of ample girth, Cruise had employed butt pads during filming. The star eventually addressed and denied the suppositions.

=== Editing and scoring ===
As with his previous collaborations with Bryan Singer on The Usual Suspects, Superman Returns and X2, editor-composer John Ottman edited the film without a temp track, noting if the film was working well without music, it was becoming a strong product. Since Valkyrie drew its inspirations from previous World War II films like The Great Escape (1963), Where Eagles Dare (1968), Patton (1970), and Midway (1976), filmmakers initially had a cut where title cards introduced characters and their roles. When the cut was test screened with an American audience, the title cards were removed due to complaints that there were too many characters to follow. He said the challenge on Valkyrie was to create tension from dialogue scenes, and he often reshaped scenes to do this: moments rather than whole scenes were cut from the film. Being historically accurate meant Ottman was more restricted in reorganizing scenes, but he was able to choose what lines and close-ups he could focus on. Ottman said the scene he was most saddened to delete, because he had been looking forward to scoring it, was one where von Stauffenberg dances with his wife.

Ottman originally planned for a minimal score to Valkyrie, but found that despite the film's dialogue-heavy nature, the film needed music to create a thriller atmosphere. He described the new approach as similar to his work in The Usual Suspects where "in order to keep the tension going in a scene where there's really a lot of dialogue, we had to rely on a lot of score", but the score is done in a "pulsating, subliminal way" and not an "expository score", but more like a "running pulse going through the movie". He excluded snare drums or trumpets, in the percussion and brass-led music, which are the changes made by Singer and Ottman, before scoring. He had to compose music for the North African battle before the scene was shot, because booking space to record film music is difficult. Although he found that composing music based on the script results in overlong pieces, he felt the music worked out fine for the sequence. The film's end credits piece, "They'll Remember You", is an original composition, though the lyrics were based on the poem "Wanderer's Nightsong" by German poet Johann Wolfgang von Goethe. An end piece entitled "Long Live Sacred Germany" was inspired by Adagio for Strings. Ottman described the original version of the track as a "three minute drone that I slowed down with these two Tuvan throat singers, the whole thing was this horribly dark, morbid piece [which] left you cold". He further composed a metallic motif for Hitler, which was formed by low strings and a piano cluster.

== German response to production ==
Stauffenberg played an important role in the military resistance against the Nazi regime and in the [German military's] self-perception ... A sincere and respectable depiction of the events of the 20th of July and of Stauffenberg is therefore very much in Germany's interest. Tom Cruise, with his Scientology background, is not the right person for this.

— German Defence Ministry Spokesperson Harald Kammerbauer, June 2007.

In June 2007, prior to production, a German Defence Ministry spokesperson said that filming of Valkyrie would not be allowed at the country's military sites if protagonist Colonel Claus von Stauffenberg was portrayed by Tom Cruise, due to the actor's adherence to Scientology, which is considered a dangerous cult by the German authorities. The spokesperson further indicated that the ministry had not at that time received official filming requests from Valkyrie's producers. Colonel Stauffenberg's eldest child, retired Bundeswehr general Berthold Maria Schenk Graf von Stauffenberg, also voiced concerns over Cruise's portrayal of his father, saying that he would not oppose the film's production, but hoped that Cruise would drop the role. "I fear that only terrible kitsch will come out of the project. It's bound to be rubbish," he said. "Cruise should keep his hands off my father." Later in the month, the ministry reversed its stance and welcomed production of Valkyrie.

The initial controversy reportedly stemmed from German member of parliament Antje Blumenthal, an authority on cults for the Christian Democratic Union and well-known opponent of Scientology, who had claimed that the German Defence Minister had assured her that the film would not be shot in the country. In addition, Cruise's affiliation with Scientology was also criticized by junior politicians such as Rudolf Köberle, the state secretary for interior issues in the state of Baden-Württemberg. Thomas Gandow, a spokesperson for the German Protestant Church, said Cruise's involvement in the film would "have the same propaganda advantages for Scientology as the 1936 Olympics had for the Nazis" and compared the actor to Nazi propaganda minister Joseph Goebbels.

Some of the family have spoken out because they don't think it will do the story justice and others don't think the casting is ideal, but I totally disagree, especially after I met Tom and saw how he is approaching the role with such professionalism. I think most of the family are curious to see the finished film.

— Philipp von Schulthess, grandson of Colonel von Stauffenberg, September 2007.

The film subsequently found local support in Germany. Director Florian Henckel von Donnersmarck saw that Cruise's involvement would promote awareness of a neglected story, and veteran German actor Armin Mueller-Stahl also gave his support to the production. A grandson of Colonel von Stauffenberg, who appeared in the film as an assistant, hailed Cruise's professionalism and indicated that most of his family were curious to see the finished product. In September 2007, when the Defence Ministry initially denied permission for filming at the Bendlerblock memorial, support for the film came in from German newspaper columnists and filmmakers, including director Wolfgang Petersen and Frank Schirrmacher, journalist and co-publisher of the Frankfurter Allgemeine Zeitung. Schirrmacher visited the set and agreed that the film would advance global awareness of the German Resistance. Ultimately granting access to the Bendlerblock after reviewing the script, the Defence Ministry said it showed that "barbarism didn't triumph but led to the founding of a democratic Germany". Ursula Caberta, who is in charge of a German government office which monitors Scientology, was disappointed in the ministry's decision, saying, "Tom Cruise [is] a figurehead of an anti-constitutional organization, and he should be treated that way."

A spokesperson for Scientology in Berlin, Sabine Weber, said in August 2007 that she was "shocked" by German politicians' criticisms, adding that it was a "call to discrimination" against someone based on their religious beliefs. In the same month, Cruise suggested to his critics that they see the film before denouncing it. In October 2007, fellow Valkyrie actor Kenneth Branagh said that the issue had been "largely exaggerated" and that the German official who initially incited the complaints contacted the production one week into filming to apologise, after reading the script and realising he had misinterpreted the film's plot.

In November 2007, the head of the German Resistance Memorial Centre warned against any potential "myth formation" around von Stauffenberg as a result of the film, urging that any understanding of the Colonel must also be informed by the fact that he had been loyal to the Nazi cause for most of his military career. In the same month Cruise was given a Bambi courage award, presented by German media company Hubert Burda Media, "for tackling a story that had never been covered by Hollywood before".

Klaus Berg of the Hamburg Chronicle stated that "... It is a well-known cliche that American film makers prefer to provide their audiences with a happy ending. Here, a viewer with even the most superficial and rudimentary knowledge of the history of the Second World War and of the National Socialist Regime would know from the very outset that a happy ending is out of the question, that all the protagonists' efforts and plans are doomed to end in bitter failure. Knowing this, I was surprised to realize how deeply I was caught up in the tension of the plot, how desperately I was hoping against hope that Cruise and his fellows would after all succeed. ... No, not for one minute during the entire film did I think about Scientology."

== Marketing ==
Valkyrie was intended to be a high-profile film that would jump-start United Artists, the host studio partly owned by Tom Cruise and Paula Wagner. Pressure was placed on Valkyrie to do well since an earlier United Artists film featuring Cruise, Lions for Lambs, performed poorly in the box office, and the studio's planned production of Oliver Stone's Pinkville was canceled. The film changed release dates multiple times. It was originally slated to be released on August 8, 2008, then moved up earlier to June 27, 2008. The film was then held off to October 3, 2008, to avoid competition from WALL-E and Wanted, and to enable the late filming of the North African battle sequence. The October date was also originally chosen to increase the film's chances of awards success. In April 2008, the release date was pushed back to February 13, 2009, with the studio citing the early fall schedule as too crowded with Academy Award prospects. Valkyrie would have taken advantage of the lucrative President's Day weekend, after The Wolfman and The Pink Panther 2 were moved from this date.

In July 2008, United Artists president of worldwide marketing Dennis Rice was replaced by Michael Vollman, who was tasked to develop a marketing strategy for the "troubled" Valkyrie, which had been "battered by constant media sniping". Under Vollman, by August 2008, the release date was changed to December 26, 2008, with reports citing commercial reasons for the move after a successful test screening. (The film was ultimately released on Christmas Day, December 25, 2008.) The release date was before the end of December, which "crucially" helped the film with a home distribution deal with the subscription channel Showtime. In the same month of August, Paula Wagner left her position with the studio during the film's post-production. The changing release date for Valkyrie drew criticism about the viability of United Artists, and the studio aimed to combat the criticism leading up to the film's eventual release. In addition, the first theatrical trailer, released early in 2008, received "mixed buzz" over Tom Cruise's portraying von Stauffenberg with an American accent. The trade paper Variety described the trailer as "dour and ... like it was selling a talky stage play with a cast of old British actors". Images of Tom Cruise as Colonel von Stauffenberg that surfaced during filming were widely ridiculed. Terry Press, a marketing consultant with the studio, said that Valkyrie had been wrongly labeled as "the Tom Cruise eye-patch movie".

As the December release date approached, United Artists launched a campaign to reform public perception of the film, downplaying the role of Tom Cruise as a German war hero and instead pitching Valkyrie as "a character-driven suspense thriller". The new campaign also played up the reputation of director Bryan Singer, who had directed the thrillers The Usual Suspects (1995) and Apt Pupil (1998). Terry Press urged foregoing an awards campaign for the film; Cruise agreed with the consultant, while Singer was disappointed about the decision. Instead, the studio focused on audience appeal in a competitive time frame in late December. A second theatrical trailer and a new poster were unveiled in October 2008 by United Artists to renew Valkyrie's viability with audiences and accolades. The poster was designed to have flashy graphics and to emulate the posters from the war films The Great Escape (1963) and The Dirty Dozen (1967) in having a team as a central visual. The team element was based on market research from the studio's focus groups who indicated that they liked Cruise as "a character leading a group of people toward solving a problem". The new trailer accentuated action, and was widely considered an improvement over the first trailer. An internal MGM memo reported the reception of the trailer by online communities to be "significantly favorable" compared to the previous trailer. The studio sought two demographic quadrants: males over 35 years old as well as younger males. Since United Artists reported that the film cost $75 million to make and that $60 million was spent on marketing, the studio faced high financial stakes. The film also tested the determination of its distributor Metro-Goldwyn-Mayer and the mettle of Cruise as a superstar.

== Release ==
=== Theatrical run ===
Prior to Valkyrie's December 2008 release, concern was raised about how the film would be received in the holiday season due to its Nazi subject matter, along with related films The Boy in the Striped Pajamas, The Reader, Defiance and Good. Advertising Age wrote during the 2008 financial crisis: "The depressing state of the economy and an alarmingly low level of understanding of the Holocaust among American youth point to a tough road for such serious fare."

Valkyrie opened on Christmas Day, December 25, 2008, in 2,711 theaters in the United States and Canada. The film grossed an estimated $8.5 million for the opening day. In the four-day holiday weekend, Valkyrie grossed an estimated $30 million, ranking fourth at the box office with $7,942 per theater. Pamela McClintock of Variety cited the weekend performance as "a victory for United Artists and MGM"; Gitesh Pandya of Rotten Tomatoes said the haul represented a "big hit" for the studio. Studio research revealed that audiences averaged 55% male and 66% over 25. Paul Dergarabedian, president of box-office tracker Media By Numbers, said that the weekend gross "totally robs the nay-sayers of their ability to deem it a flop", believing that Cruise's comic performance in the previous summer's Tropic Thunder helped audiences embrace the star again. Dergarabedian also ascribed the better-than-expected performance to the studio's marketing of Valkyrie as a thriller film. Since Cruise was collecting a salary of $20 million against 20% of the backend (revenue gathered after the completion of a film) and MGM/UA investment was capped at $60 million, United Artists sold the film to several foreign territories to make money back.

The European premiere was held at the Potsdamer Platz in Berlin on January 20, 2009. Valkyrie commercially opened in over a dozen territories outside the United States and Canada on the weekend of January 23, 2009, including a premiere in Germany on January 22. The film ranked first in the international box office, grossing over $13 million. It placed first in Germany, Australia, and the Netherlands and placed second in the United Kingdom, Austria and South Korea. Valkyrie's highest-grossing territory was Germany, where it earned $3.7 million from 689 locations, averaging $5,311 per screen. The German opening was considered "a chart-topping yet unspectacular start", barely edging out Twilight, which opened three weeks before. BBC News reported that the premiere of the film has renewed the topic of the German Resistance among the German populace.

The film opened in 13 additional territories on the weekend of January 30, including Russia and Spain. With 3,600 screenings in 26 markets, the film grossed $18.6 million to maintain its top placement at the international box office for a second weekend in a row. Spain was its highest-grossing territory with $2.8 million, followed by Germany with $2.3 million, the United Kingdom with $2 million, and $1.9 million in Italy. As of April 13, 2009, the film has grossed $83,079,000 in the United States and Canada and an estimated $117,198,951 in other territories for a worldwide gross of $200,276,784.

=== Anti-Scientology protests ===
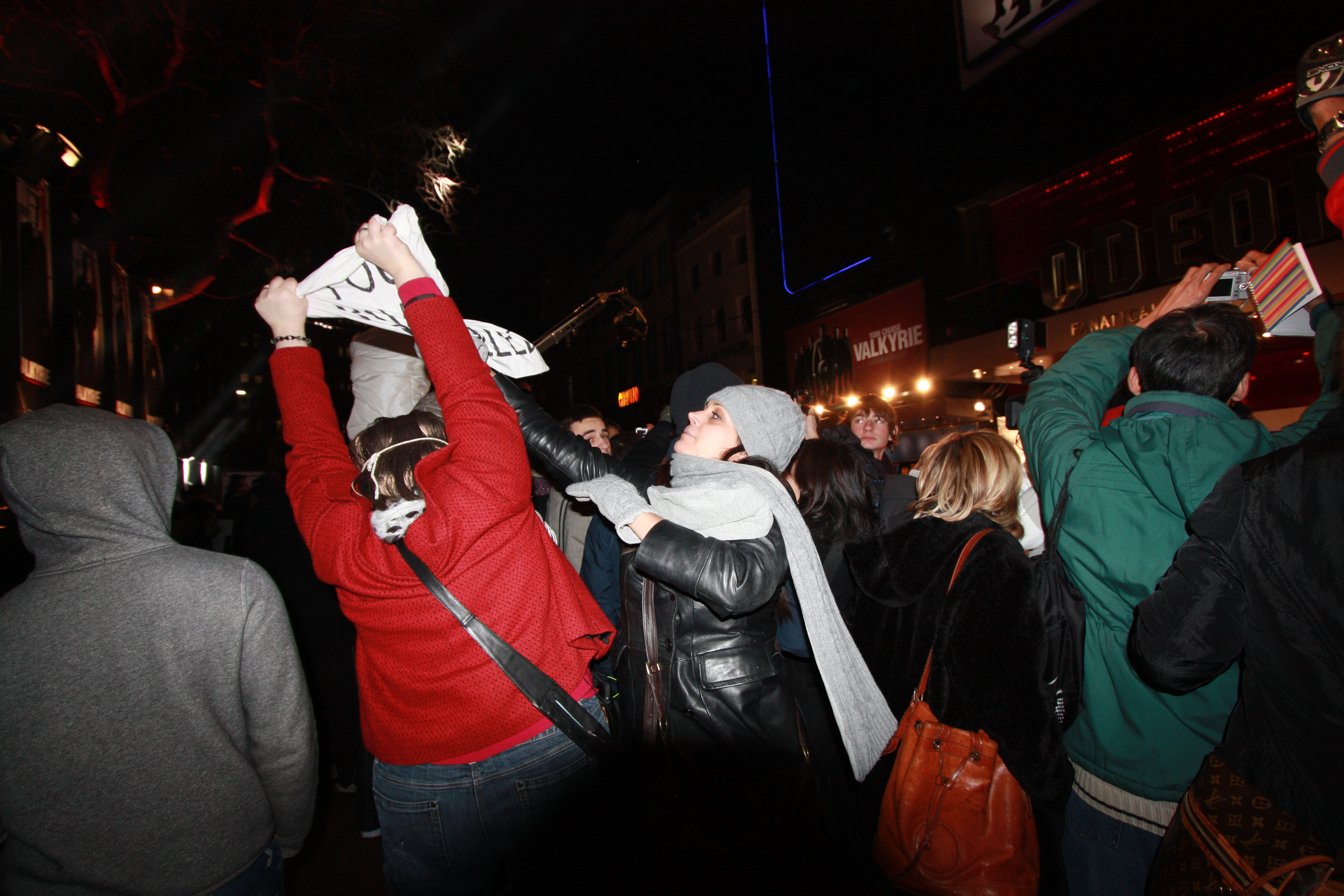
A masked protester with a sign saying "Tom Cruise Cult Hero" at the London premiere is confronted by an unidentified woman who attempts to forcibly wrestle the sign from her grasp.

When Valkyrie premiered in New York City on December 15, 2008, it was shown in a private screening room at the Time Warner Center, rather than at a Lincoln Square theater. The venue was chosen in part to minimize the exposure to Scientology protesters gathered at the Time Warner Center. While the US "red carpet" was held in private, Cruise interacted with fans in South Korea and Europe. There were small anti-Scientology protests at the European premiere in Berlin, where Cruise signed one protester's Guy Fawkes mask. Anti-Scientology protests also occurred at the London premiere, and Amsterdam where Scientologists in the crowd engaged the protesters. The NTV news report about the January 26 Moscow premiere noted that journalists had to sign a document promising not to ask questions about Scientology, and their questions would be censored; to this, the reporter remarked, "You can't help getting reminded of those historic times depicted in Operation Valkyrie."

In Germany, authorities and politicians expressed concern that if the film was successful, it would boost Scientology in the country. German politician Michael Brand encouraged his deputies to boycott Valkyrie, saying that Scientology pursued "totalitarian goals". Germany's Agency for the Protection of the Constitution (BfV), which monitors the presence of Scientology in the country, expressed concern about the film's impact. An anonymous BfV official said: "These Scientologists have two goals in Germany ... to get their message to children, and make their organization respectable. The film does both: it has put a top Scientologist at the center of a national debate about German history."

In January 2009, Cruise appeared in the highly popular German-Swiss-Austrian TV show, Wetten, dass. Cruise had already left the show, when German comedian Michael Mittermeier said: "In an interview, Tom Cruise claimed that he would have killed Hitler, too. To me, it would be sufficient if he had killed the Führer of Scientology." Prior to the show, members of the Christian Democratic Junge Union protested against the broadcaster for being uncritical about Scientology.

=== Home media ===
Valkyrie was released on DVD and Blu-ray on May 19, 2009, in three configurations: a single DVD edition, a two-DVD set, and a Blu-ray version. Valkyrie opened at #2 on the DVD sales chart, selling 844,264 units translating to revenue of $14,816,833. According to the latest figures, 1,631,011 units have been sold, bringing in $27,042,657 in revenue.

== Reception ==
The movie website Rotten Tomatoes gave Valkyrie an approval rating of 62%, based on 196 reviews, with an average rating of 6.19/10. The site's critical consensus reads: "Given the subject matter, Valkyrie could have been an outstanding historical thriller, but settles for being a mildly entertaining, but disposable yarn." At Metacritic, which assigns a normalized rating to reviews from mainstream critics, the film has received an average score of 56 out of 100, based on 36 critics, indicating "mixed or average reviews". In the United States, the film received mixed reviews from critics, however in Germany, there were different reports about how Valkyrie was received. The New York Times wrote: "It has been greeted with a measured and hospitable reception in Germany, where it was once viewed with suspicion." The trade paper Variety reported that, despite the controversy over Cruise's ties to Scientology, "initial reviews have been positive, with many observers now hailing Cruise and predicting the pic will even improve the country's image abroad." Der Spiegel said that the film and its supporting actors were praised, but that Cruise was panned by German critics for "a surprisingly low-key performance that fails to convey the charisma with which Stauffenberg inspired fellow plotters". The AFP also said that the German critics "savaged Tom Cruise's portrayal" of von Stauffenberg, yet "relished a homegrown hero getting the Hollywood treatment".

=== American critics ===
Joe Morganstern wrote in The Wall Street Journal: "Mr. Cruise's performance turns out to be brisk and reasonably plausible, though unexceptional, while the production as a whole succeeds as an elaborate procedural, impressively staged in historical locations." Manohla Dargis of The New York Times thought that Cruise gave "a fine, typically energetic performance in a film that requires nothing more of him than a profile and vigor" but that von Stauffenberg was too complex a character to adequately portray in a film designed as a thriller. Dargis also wrote of the director's excess: "Though Mr. Singer's old-fashioned movie habits, his attention to the gloss, gleam and glamour of the image, can be agreeably pleasurable, he tends to gild every lily," citing as an example the "spooky music" and "low camera angles" in the meeting between Hitler and von Stauffenberg. Roger Ebert of the Chicago Sun-Times also found Cruise "perfectly satisfactory, if not electrifying, in the leading role", believing that the portrayal fit the "veterans of officer rank" that would not panic under fire; Ebert recognizes that "Singer ... works heroically to introduce us to the major figures in the plot, to tell them apart, to explain their roles and to suggest their differences."

Writing in Time, Richard Schickel said: "I'm not going to argue that Valkyrie is a great movie. But in its way it is a thoughtful and entertaining one, especially in comparison with the pomp and pretentiousness of most of the competition this holiday season." Ty Burr of The Boston Globe described the film: "It's a smooth, compelling, almost suspenseful ... and slightly hollow Hollywood period piece - a World War II action-drama in which an intriguing (but not electrifying) star performance is buttressed by stellar support." Burr analyzed Cruise's performance: "... his Claus von Stauffenberg is an honorable conception that's ultimately too thin to fully rise up from the pages of history. This story deserves to be told, but for reasons best known to himself, the star has latched onto a strictly Nietzschean interpretation that he rides into the ground. Maybe he thinks what doesn't kill him will win him an Oscar." Claudia Puig of USA Today thought of Cruise as "unconvincing and stiff as the disenchanted" von Stauffenberg. She felt that the film started slowly and that "even during scenes of intense action, the visually slick production is only minimally engrossing". She concluded of the film's overall pace: "The action becomes more engrossing during the film's second half, but one expects more depth and nuance, given its pedigree." Anthony Lane of The New Yorker wrote: "[Cruise] carries the movie, although, once you dig beneath the uniform, there isn't much for him to get a handle on; the fascination with Stauffenberg resides in what he did, not in who he was." Lane thought that there was "too much" character acting of the British veteran actors and felt of the casting of Nighy, Stamp, and Wilkinson: "These men are meant to be battle-toughened Nazi officers, but what we get is an array of discreetly amusing studies in mild neurosis."

Todd McCarthy of Variety wrote that Valkyrie "has visual splendor galore, but is a cold work lacking in the requisite tension and suspense". McCarthy considered Cruise as "a bit stiff but still adequate" as von Stauffenberg. The critic believed that McQuarrie's script was well-carpentered but felt that compressing and streamlining the events to make a known failed plot more thrilling lacked a "sufficient sizzle into the dialogue or individuality into the characters". McCarthy missed "many of the interesting personal and political nuances pertaining to these men" that were not detailed. He thought that the production design by Lilly Kilvert and Patrick Lumb stood out, that Newton Thomas Sigel's cinematography had a "restrained elegance", and that John Ottman performed well in his dual role as editor and composer. A similar sentiment was stated by Mike LaSalle in the San Francisco Chronicle, who wrote: "There's nothing inherently laughable about the spectacle of Tom Cruise with an eye patch and a missing hand, strutting around in a German colonel's uniform. But neither is there anything about him that truly suggests Claus von Stauffenberg, leader of the 1944 conspiracy to decapitate the Nazi government and stage a coup d'etat. Think of Valkyrie as a reasonably entertaining drama about the time Tom Cruise tried to kill Hitler. Do that, and it becomes possible to enjoy the movie".

=== German critics ===
Despite differences over the quality of the film, critics were in agreement that the film had drawn attention to von Stauffenberg's cause. It was applauded "both as a history lesson and as a film". Tobias Kniebe of the Süddeutsche Zeitung described the film as "maybe not the masterpiece we might have dreamed of ... but not much less", a sentiment shared by many German critics. The public-service German television channel ZDF called Valkyrie "neither scandalously bad nor the event of the century. ... Neither is it the action thriller we feared, but it is a well-made and serious film." The newspaper Kölner Stadt-Anzeiger reported that any fear that the "myth of the German resistance would be put through a Hollywood filter has turned out to be wrong and prejudicial".

Other critics thought that Tom Cruise did not "make the grade" as a German war hero. The film critic for Der Tagesspiegel wrote: "[Cruise's] image as an actor has been finally ruined by Valkyrie ... [the film] doesn't dare to be popcorn cinema and at the same time lacks any conceptual brilliance." Hanns-Georg Rodek of Die Welt reported of Cruise's performance: "He comes over best as an American hero, someone who battles for respect with aggression and energy. But Stauffenberg was a German hero, with aristocratic bearing, and Cruise cannot carry that off." The Frankfurter Allgemeine Sonntagszeitung said Cruise's performance was "credible", and reserved praise for the authenticity of the dubbed German-language version of the film over the original.

=== Accolades ===
Valkyrie was nominated by the Academy of Science Fiction, Fantasy & Horror Films for seven Saturn Awards: Best Action/Adventure/Thriller Film, Best Director for Bryan Singer, Best Actor for Tom Cruise, Best Supporting Actor for Bill Nighy, Best Supporting Actress for Carice van Houten, Best Music for John Ottman and Best Costume Design for Joanna Johnston. The film was nominated by the Visual Effects Society Awards in the category of Outstanding Supporting Visual Effects in a Feature Motion Picture.

== Historical accuracy ==
The Gestapo investigated the July 20 plot thoroughly, so filmmakers had access to much documentation as they integrated the historical account with "Hollywood factors" in producing Valkyrie. Peter Hoffmann, professor of history at McGill University and a leading authority on the German Resistance, was a consultant for the filmmakers. Hoffmann spoke of the film's accuracy, "[Valkyrie] gives a fundamentally accurate portrait of Stauffenberg and the conspirators. There are details which must be counted as liberties. But, fundamentally, the film is decent, respectful and represents the spirit of the conspiracy." The Scotsman reported of the film's accuracy: "Valkyrie ... sticks pretty closely to the story of the failed conspiracy to topple the Nazi regime ... it implies that the plot came closer to success than it really did. But the basic facts are all present and correct."

In addition, von Stauffenberg's elder brother Berthold was omitted from the film. Bryan Singer purposely left out some of von Stauffenberg's "macho" moments in writing the character, such as the colonel's refusal of morphine to avoid addiction. He explained the removals: "There were things I actually left out because I knew people would think we were making them up ... imagine Tom Cruise saying 'No morphine!' People would think it's a contrivance." In the film, von Haeften steps out in front of von Stauffenberg when he faces the firing squad, but when filmmakers attempted to reconstruct the scene based on eyewitness testimony and photographs, they discovered that the shots that killed von Haeften would also have killed von Stauffenberg, who was actually shot shortly after. Therefore, director Singer had only two members of the firing squad fire, without command, to kill von Haeften but not Stauffenberg. This attempt to explain why Stauffenberg was not killed by the shots that killed von Haeften is speculative but not impossible. Another alteration was to the portrayal of Carl Friedrich Goerdeler, played in the film by Kevin McNally. Goerdeler was written in the film to be antagonistic, dramatically representing the friction and conflict that existed within the conspiracy, though filmmakers considered him a "much more moral character" in reality.

One significant historical alteration, made to avoid confusion with the audience and also to "set the stage" at the Wolf's Lair, was changing the location of the first aborted assassination attempt to kill Hitler on July 11. Historically, Stauffenberg first attempted to use his briefcase bomb at Hitler's Berghof residence near Berchtesgaden on 11 July 1944, but he did not arm it because Himmler and Göring were absent (he wanted to kill them as well). In the film, this attempt is set inside Hitler's concrete bunker at the Wolf's Lair. Meanwhile, the Berchtesgaden affair is downgraded to a brief scene in which Hitler meets with Stauffenberg to approve a revised plan for Operation Valkyrie (in reality, the Valkyrie updates occurred over a period of several weeks at meetings between Hitler and General Olbricht). Producer Christopher McQuarrie later stated that the shift of the first assassination attempt to the Wolf's Lair was in order to show the audience the inside of the concrete command bunker, with the intent being to emphasize that Hitler most certainly would have been killed had the July 20 attempt not been moved to the outdoor conference hut.

British novelist Justin Cartwright, who wrote the book The Song Before It Is Sung about one of the plot's conspirators, wrote: "The film is true to most of the facts of the plot, but fails to convey any sense of the catastrophic moral and political vortex into which Germans were being drawn." Though not depicted, but briefly mentioned in the film, von Stauffenberg was persuaded to become involved in the plot by his uncle, Nikolaus Graf von Üxküll-Gyllenband, and his uncle's good friend, Fritz-Dietlof Graf von Schulenburg, who were both disenchanted with the Nazis and appalled by the atrocities in the concentration camps. The film also did not explore von Stauffenberg's philosophy and background, which Cartwright felt fit the German tradition of Dichter und Helden ("poets and heroes"). Cartwright described how von Stauffenberg was an appropriate leader for the plot: "He was the man who unmistakably wore the mantle of a near-mystic German past, a warrior Germany, a noble Germany, a poetic Germany, a Germany of myth and longing." The novelist felt that Cruise's portrayal was more akin to one as a "troublesome cop". Cartwright also noted that the film did not raise the question of what kind of Germany that von Stauffenberg had in mind if the plot succeeded.

The film did not mention or include the popular Generalfeldmarschall Erwin Rommel. He was implicated in the plot and was later forced to kill himself because he knew about the plot but did not warn Hitler.

Historian Peter Steinbach has criticized the negative portrayals of some of the conspirators. According to Steinbach, the movie depicts Goerdeler in a "hurtful and irresponsible way". Also, the characterisation of Olbricht is "downright degrading", as it downplays Olbricht's important role in the plot. The movie portrays the non-military resistance as "quarreling, burnt out and powerless". Actually, the military conspirators were not aiming at a military coup d'état but wanted to open up room for politicians. On the other hand, Stauffenberg is shown as being driven by the persecution and murdering of the Jews; however, in reality, the Holocaust was the primary motive for only a few conspirators.

== See also ==
- Valkyrie (soundtrack)
- List of American films of 2008
