= List of legal awards =

This list of legal awards is an index to articles related to notable awards for work related to the law, a system of rules that are created and enforced through social or governmental institutions to regulate conduct. The list is organized by country, since contributions are typically to the law of a country rather than to international law, and are made by citizens of that country.

== List ==
Country	Award	Sponsor	Given for
Belgium	Fernand Collin Prize for Law	University Foundation	Scientist who makes a significant contribution to law in Belgium
France	René Cassin Thesis Prize	Fondation René Cassin - Institut international des droits de l'homme	Best French-language and English-language dissertations worldwide in legal theory of human rights, international, regional or comparative human rights law.
Germany	Helmuth-James-von-Moltke-Preis	International Society for Military Law and the Law of War	Outstanding judicial works in the field of security policy
Great Britain	Yorke Prize	University of Cambridge	Essay of a University of Cambridge graduate which makes a substantial contribution to its relevant field of legal knowledge
Italy	Marco Biagi Award	International Association of Labour Law Journals	Best article concerning comparative and/or international labour or employment law and employment relations
European Union	EPLO Thesis Prize Award	European Public Law Organization, formerly European Public Law Center	Best doctoral or postdoctoral public law thesis characterized by its European dimension
Norway	Holberg Prize	Government of Norway	for outstanding scholarly work in the arts, the humanities, social sciences, law, and theology, either within one of these academic fields alone or through interdisciplinary work
Switzerland	JB Scott Prize	Institut de Droit International	Best dissertation in international law in English, French, German, Italian, or Spanish worldwide.
United States	Burton Awards for Legal Achievement	Burton Foundation, Library of Congress	Various categories
United States	Thomas Jefferson Foundation Medal in Law	Thomas Jefferson Foundation	Distinguished contributions in the field of Law
United States	American Bar Association Medal	American Bar Association	Exceptionally distinguished service by a lawyer or lawyers to the cause of American jurisprudence
United States	Brandeis Award (litigation)	Federal Trade Commission	Outstanding litigators
United States	Brandeis Medal	University of Louisville	Commitment to the ideals of individual liberty, concern for the disadvantaged and public service
United States	Gruber Prize for Justice	Gruber Foundation	Individuals or organizations for contributions that have advanced the cause of justice as delivered through the legal system
United States	Harrison Tweed Award	American Bar Association, National Legal Aid & Defender Association	Extraordinary achievements of state and local bar associations that develop or significantly expand projects or programs to increase access to civil legal services for poor persons or criminal defense services for indigents
United States	Morton A. Brody Distinguished Judicial Service Award	Colby College	United States federal or state judge who embodies the qualities of integrity, compassion, humanity, and judicial craftsmanship
United States	Silver Gavel Award	American Bar Association	Outstanding work by those who help improve comprehension of jurisprudence in the United States
United States	William O. Douglas Prize	National Communication Association	Those who contribute to writing about freedom of speech
United States	William J. Brennan Award	Various awards	In honor of William J. Brennan Jr. E.g. Thomas Jefferson Center for the Protection of Free Expression; District of Columbia Bar; International Commission of Jurists; Association of the Federal Bar of the State of New Jersey; National Trial Advocacy College at the University of Virginia School of Law
United States	Thomas E. Dewey Medal	The New York City Bar Association (City Bar)	In honor of Thomas E. Dewey; presented annually to an outstanding assistant district attorney in each of the City’s District Attorney’s offices and in the Office of the City’s Special Narcotics Prosecutor.

== See also ==
- Lists of awards
- List of awards for contributions to society
- Lists of humanities awards
- List of social sciences awards
