= Central Virginia Legal Aid Society =

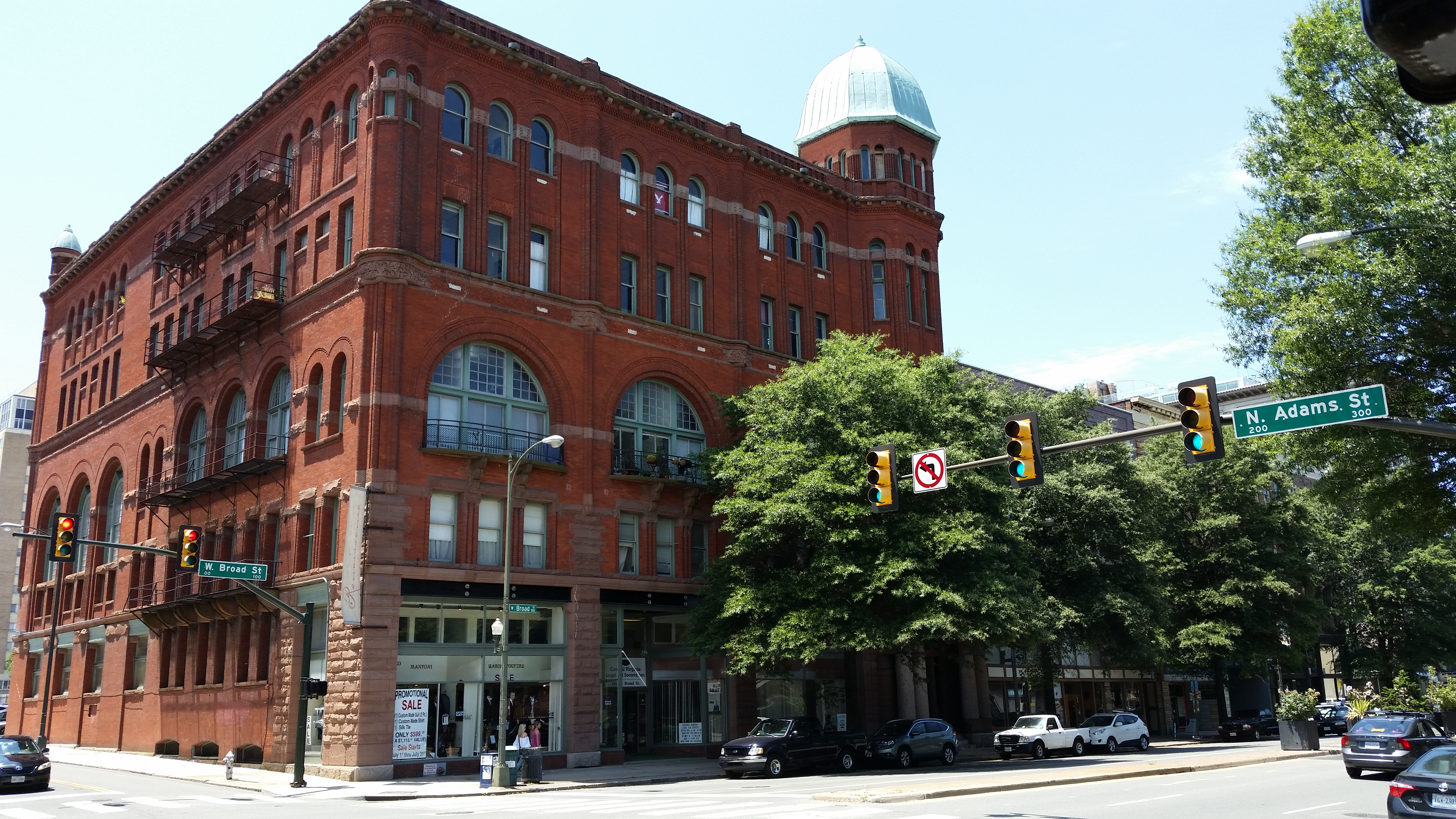
- Street view of the Central Virginia Legal Aid Society's Richmond office.
- Formation: 1971
- Purpose: Legal aid
- Headquarters: Richmond, Virginia
- Website: http://cvlas.org/

The Central Virginia Legal Aid Society (CVLAS) is a nonprofit organization that provides free legal assistance in civil matters to low-income and elderly residents in central Virginia.

== Mission and services ==
CVLAS is one of 10 legal aid services in Virginia. The geographical area it covers includes the cities of Richmond, Petersburg, Hopewell, Colonial Heights and Charlottesville, as well as the counties of Albemarle, Charles City, Chesterfield, Dinwiddie, Fluvanna, Goochland, Greene, Hanover, Henrico, Louisa, Nelson, New Kent, Powhatan, Prince George and Surry. It has offices in Richmond, Charlottesville and Petersburg.

CVLAS provides legal advice primarily in the areas of bankruptcy, consumer and disability rights, employment law, housing law, family law, and public benefits. Through the Legal Services Corporation, it receives federal funding and is thus subject to specific restrictions: The society and its employees may not be affiliated with a political party, support a specific candidate, lobby for legislation or represent criminal clients, among other activities.

The society primarily represents individuals with incomes under 125% of the poverty line, although it may accept clients earning up to 200% of the poverty line. It also represents people over the age of 60, even if they do not meet the income qualifications. Its services include legal advice, briefs, negotiation, litigation, and representation in administrative hearings, as well as community education and activities in partnership with other local, state, and national legal aid groups.

The Richmond office has the resources to help only 4,000 to 5,000 low-income residents a year. According to the Virginia State Bar, Virginia has one lawyer for every 349 people, but just one legal aid lawyer for every 6,200 residents living in poverty.

CVLAS hosts a local radio show titled It's Time for Justice, broadcast every Wednesday from 12:30 to 1:00 p.m. on WRIR-LP. The host is Martin D. Wegbreit, CVLAS's director of litigation. The show includes news, interviews, and answers to listeners' questions about consumer, employment, family, housing, public benefits, and other civil law.

== Partnerships ==
Attorneys in CVLAS's Richmond office run free workshops and information sessions on subjects such as power of attorney and writing wills, and the organization works with local law students through the No Fault Divorce Program at the University of Richmond School of Law. The Charlottesville office partnered with the University of Virginia to create the Sexual Assault Advocacy Fund (SAAF), whose goal is to provide support to survivors of sexual assault on college campuses.

CVLAS is also involved in the Medical-Legal Partnership, Richmond (MLP-R), a collaboration with the VCU Health System (part of Virginia Commonwealth University), the University of Richmond School of Law, the Legal Aid Justice Center, and the Legal Information Network for Cancer. The partnership provides free legal services to patients at the Children's Hospital of Richmond at VCU (MLP-R at Pediatrics), VCU's Massey Cancer Center (MLP-R at Massey) and VCU's Hayes Willis Center of South Richmond (MLP-R at Hayes Willis). Its mission is to "integrate legal assistance as a vital component of patient care, reduce health disparities and create a new standard of care for vulnerable, low income patients".

JusticeServer, a database used to make pro bono work easier and more accessible in Virginia, was created with help from CVLAS.

== History ==
The first legal aid organizations serving the Richmond area were the Neighborhood Legal Aid Society and the Metropolitan Richmond Legal Aid Society, both founded in 1971. They merged in 1981 to form CVLAS. Similarly, legal aid programs were formed in Charlottesville in 1967 and Petersburg in 1974. The Virginia Farm Workers Legal Assistance Project, currently the Virginia Farmworkers Program, was established in 1978, serving H2A visa holders statewide. In 2001, the legacy of these organizations consolidated into one organization, funded in part by the Legal Services Corporation, under the name Central Virginia Legal Aid Society.

CVLAS and the Virginia Bar Association were awarded the Harrison Tweed Award by the American Bar Association for their pro bono hotline and pro bono housing law programs. CVLAS is the only two-time winner of the award.

In 2013, CVLAS received a grant from Enroll Virginia! to provide certified navigators to offer application assistance for the health insurance marketplace established under the Affordable Care Act.

=== Notable past attorneys ===
From 1985 to 1998, Anne Holton worked as a staff attorney for the Central Virginia Legal Aid Society. In 1998, she was appointed by the Virginia General Assembly to be a judge on the Richmond Juvenile and Domestic Relations Court, and she was Virginia's secretary of education until she resigned when her husband, U.S. Senator Tim Kaine, became the 2016 Democratic vice-presidential nominee.

Former Executive Director Henry W. McLaughlin has received a number of awards and honors, including the Virginia State Bar's Annual Legal Aid Award in 1994, Virginia Lawyers Weekly's Leader in the Law title in 2009, and the Richmond Bar Association's Hill-Tucker Public Service Award in March 2010. He is also a fellow of the Virginia Law Foundation and of the American College of Trial Lawyers, the only legal aid attorney to be so honored.

=== Current leadership ===
The current executive director is Steve Dickinson, and the director of litigation is Martin D. Wegbreit, the first recipient of the Virginia State Bar's Legal Aid Award.

Doris Henderson Causey formerly served as the managing attorney in Richmond, as well as the first African-American and first legal aid lawyer to fill the top elected post for the Virginia State Bar.

== Funding ==
CVLAS, a nonprofit 501(c)(3) organization, receives funding from the Legal Services Corporation, the Commonwealth of Virginia, and United Way of America, as well as IOLTA funds and other grants and donations. Along with the Legal Aid Justice Center, it often relies on fundraisers and private donations. One of the largest individual supporters of legal aid in central Virginia is John Grisham.

== See also ==
- Legal Aid Society of Cleveland
- Legal Aid Justice Center
