= Moltke family =

German and Danish noble family

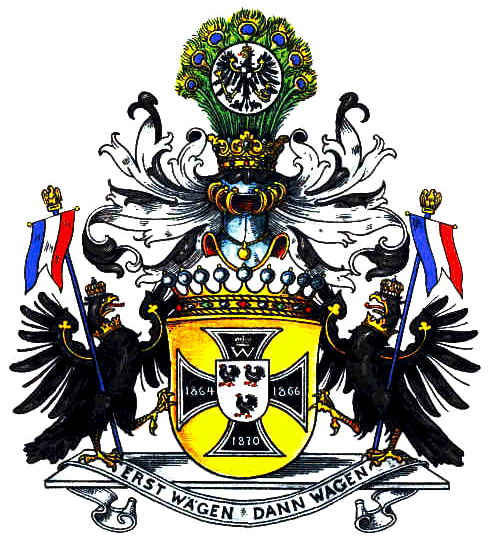
Coat of arms of Counts von Moltke

The Moltke family is an old German noble family. The family originates in Mecklenburg, with branches throughout Germany and Scandinavia. Members of the family have been noted as statesmen, high-ranking military officers, and major landowners across Denmark, Prussia, and Poland.

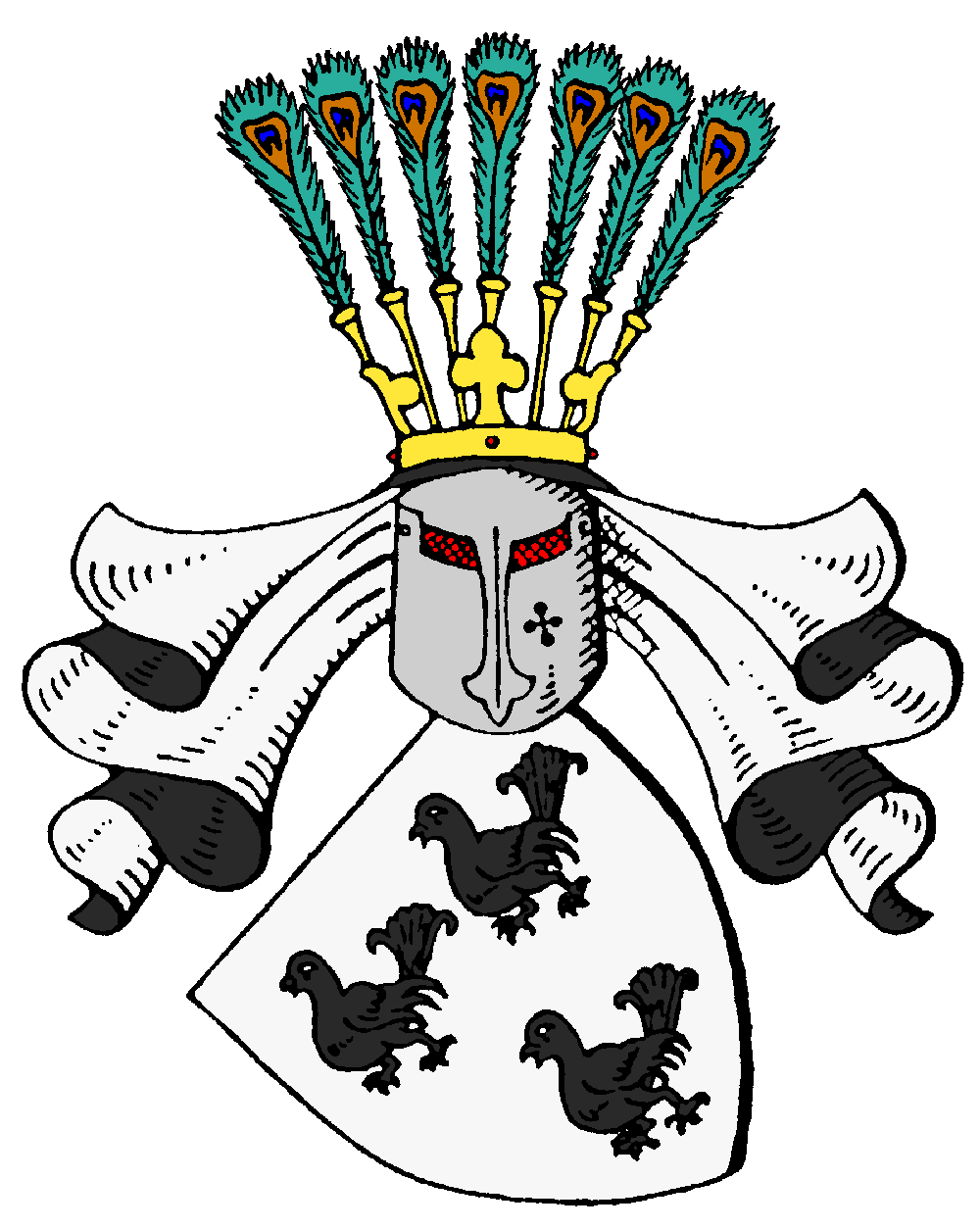
Moltke coat of arms

== History ==
The family is descended from Fridericus Meltiko, a knight from Mecklenburg who lived in the mid 13th century. The title of Count was awarded to the Danish branch in 1834, and the German branch in 1868 by King William I.

Members of the Danish branches include Prime Minister Adam Wilhelm Moltke and colonial explorer and draftsman Harald Moltke. Harald Moltke's ethnographic and nature works remain on display at the National Museum of Denmark in Copenhagen and at museums in Hillerød and Helsingør, and a number of locations in Greenland are named in honor of the family's role in Danish politics and exploration.

The family came to contemporary prominence with Helmuth von Moltke the Elder and Helmuth von Moltke the Younger, Prussian (later German) military leaders instrumental in the Franco-Prussian War and World War I respectively.

The von Moltke estate, a 500-hectare property and manor in what is today Krzyżowa, Poland (then a German territory known as Creisau or Kreisau), was purchased by Moltke the Elder with aid from Otto von Bismarck after the Austro-Prussian War of 1866, which remained the Moltke family seat until 1945. Surviving dedications to the Moltkes' place at the manor include two stairway frescos painted on Moltke the Elder's 100th birthday in 1900; The Shame, depicting the fall of Lübeck in 1806, and The Revenge, depicting the victorious capture of Paris in 1871.

In the Nazi period the Kreisau estate passed to Moltke the Elder's great-grandnephew Helmuth James Graf von Moltke, a jurist who founded the pro-democracy resistance group Kreisau Circle, headquartered at the manor. James' activism and beliefs distinguished him as a democratic pacifist who saw the Nazi crimes against humanity as an insult to the national honor of Germany, influenced by German religious socialism and the German Youth Movement. James opposed direct action as hypocritical in light of the Nazi government's institutionalization of cruelty, however the Circle's insistence on an inevitable German defeat in World War II led to his execution for treason in January 1945.

After the war and a period of German-Polish reconciliation, the estate became the focus of an initiative for a "New Kreisau", recasting the von Moltke legacy as one of James' support for democracy and the rule of law. His widow and fellow Kreisau member, Freya von Moltke, preserved many of his writings and attended the rededication of the estate as a youth organization in 1998. Upon her death, she was succeeded by her and James' son Helmuth Caspar von Moltke, the current representative of the von Moltkes' and Kreisau Circle's democratic legacy.

== Notable members ==
- Adam Gottlob Moltke (1710–1792), Danish courtier, statesman and diplomat
- Caspar Herman Gottlob Moltke (1738–1800), Danish general
- Joachim Godske Moltke (1746–1818), Prime Minister of Denmark, son of Adam Gottlob Moltke
- Friedrich Philipp Victor von Moltke (1768–1845), German Generalleutnant in Danish service
- Adam Wilhelm Moltke (1785–1864), Danish Prime Minister, son of Joachim Godske Moltke
- Helmuth von Moltke the Elder (1800–1891), Chief of the Prussian, and then German, General Staff
- Adam Friedrich Adamson Moltke (1816–1885), Danish administrative lawyer and district president
- Kuno von Moltke (1847–1923), German general
- Helmuth von Moltke the Younger (1848–1916), Chief of the German General Staff
- Otto von Moltke (1851–1881), German-Danish military officer
- Heinrich Karl Leonhard von Moltke (1854–1922), German-Danish vice admiral in the Imperial German Navy
- Harald Moltke (1871–1960), Danish painter and Arctic explorer
- Hans-Adolf von Moltke (1884–1943), German diplomat
- Else Moltke (1888–1986), Danish writer and feminist
- Erik Moltke (1901–1984), Danish art historian
- Helmuth James Graf von Moltke (1907–1945), German jurist, pacifist, executed for treason as head of the anti-Nazi and pro-democratic Kreisau Circle
  - Freya von Moltke (1911–2010), philanthropist and Kreisau survivor, née Deichmann
- Gebhardt von Moltke (1938–2019), German diplomat
- James von Moltke (born 1969), German banker, current Chief Financial Officer of Deutsche Bank.
- Carl Moltke (1869–1935), German-born Danish politician and ambassador.
- Count Carl Adam Moltke (1908–1989), Member of the Danish Mission to the United Nations
- Helmuth Caspar von Moltke (born 1939), anti-authoritarian activist and direct inheritor of the Kreisau legacy.
- Alexandra Isles (born 1945) (née Moltke), Soap opera actress, model, and former mistress of Claus von Bülow.

== Places and buildings ==
=== Europe ===
- Moltkes palæ, a forth part of Amalienborg, the castle of the Royal Family, Copenhagen, Denmark.
- Kreisau estate, Poland
- Moltke Bridge, Germany

=== Greenland ===
- Cape Moltke, Southeast Greenland
- Cape Harald Moltke, North Greenland
- Harald Moltke Glacier, West Greenland

== Literature ==
- Ernst Heinrich Kneschke: Neues allgemeines deutsches Adels-Lexicon. Friedrich Voigt, Leipzig 1859
- Olaf Jessen: Die Moltkes. Biographie einer Familie. C. H. Beck, München 2010, ISBN 978-3-406-604997 (Rezension)
- Ernst Münch: "Die Moltkes im Ringen um ihr Stammgut Toitenwinkel bei Rostock". In: Herrschaft. Machtentfaltung über adligen und fürstlichen Grundbesitz in der Frühen Neuzeit. Böhlau Verlag, Köln Weimar 2003, S. 3–26
- Jochen Thies: Die Moltkes: Von Königgrätz nach Kreisau. Eine deutsche Familiengeschichte. Piper Verlag, München 2010, ISBN 978-3-492-05380-8
- Genealogisches Handbuch des Adels, Adelslexikon Band IX, Band 116 der Gesamtreihe, C. A. Starke Verlag, Limburg (Lahn) 1998, ISSN 0435-2408
