= Theodor Haubach =

German journalist and politician (1896–1945)

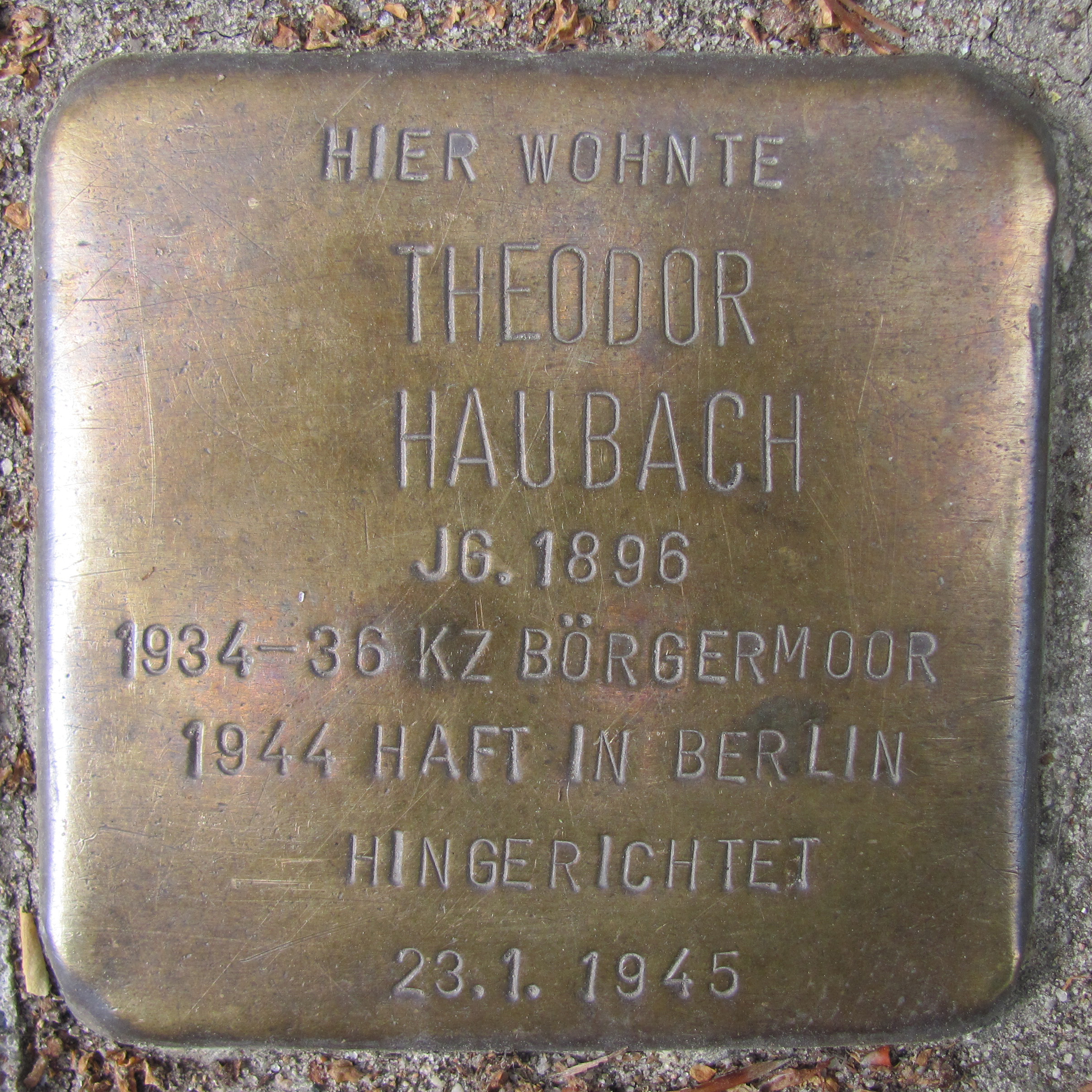
Stolperstein for Theodor Haubach in Hamburg (Hartwicusstraße 2)

Theodor Haubach (15 September 1896 in Frankfurt am Main – 23 January 1945 in Berlin) was a German journalist, SPD politician, and resistance fighter against the Nazi régime.

Theodor Haubach spent his childhood and youth in Darmstadt. In 1914, right after his Abitur, he took part in the First World War as a volunteer, and was wounded repeatedly. After the horror of his wartime experiences, Haubach resumed studying. From 1919 to 1923, he studied philosophy, sociology, and economics and eventually graduated. As of 1920, Haubach, like his friend Carlo Mierendorff, was an SPD member and worked together actively with the Young Socialists. From 1924 to 1929 he was editor of the newspaper Hamburger Echo, and later (1929–1933) an associate at the Reich Interior Ministry and with the Berlin Police President. From 1924 Haubach was the leading member of the Reichsbanner Schwarz-Rot-Gold, an association that campaigned fiercely for the Weimar democracy and actively struggled under the emblem of the "Three Arrows" against the Nazis, who were grasping for power.

Beginning in February 1933, Haubach, like many SPD members, was persecuted by the Nazi régime. After his first arrest in 1934, he was detained in Esterwegen concentration camp. From 1935, he worked as an insurance representative, and later established contacts with the Kreisau Circle. After the failed attempt on Hitler's life at the Wolf's Lair in East Prussia on 20 July 1944, Haubach was arrested and sentenced to death by the Nazi "People's Court" (Volksgerichtshof). Now very ill, Theodor Haubach was hanged on 23 January 1945 along with Helmuth James Graf von Moltke at Plötzensee Prison in Berlin.

== Literature ==
- Peter Zimmermann: Theodor Haubach (1896-1945) - Eine politische Biographie. Hamburg 2004, 454 pages, ISBN 3-935549-87-3, 30,00 Euro
- Der militante Sozialdemokrat. Carlo Mierendorff 1897 bis 1943. Eine Biografie von Richard Albrecht (JHW Dietz Nachf., 1987, 464 p., ISBN 3-8012-1128-2)
- "Symbolkrieg" in Deutschland; historisch-biografische Skizze von Richard Albrecht (MuK/Universität Siegen, 1986, 52 p.; ISSN 0721-3271)
