= Silver Gavel Award =

Award given by the American Bar Association

- Awarded for: Honors outstanding work by those who help improve comprehension of jurisprudence in the United States
- Sponsored by: American Bar Association
- Date: 1958
- Country: United States
- Website: Official website

The Silver Gavel Award (also known as the ABA Silver Gavel Awards for Media and The Arts) is an annual award the American Bar Association gives to honor outstanding work by those who help to improve comprehension of jurisprudence in the United States.

== Award ==
The award is the American Bar Association's highest form of recognition. The American Bar Association gives the award during its annual meeting, bestowing one award in each of nine categories: books, commentary, documentaries, drama & literatures, magazines, multimedia, newspapers, radio/podcast, and television.

Silver Gavels are awarded to each winner and decisions on award recipients are announced by the chairman of the American Bar Association's standing committee on Gavel Awards. In a comment in the ABA Journal, American Bar Association Division for Public Education representative Howard Kaplan noted, "From the very beginning, the Association has recognized that legal drama has an unmatched capacity to humanize legal actors and, well, dramatize legal issues for public audiences."

== Past Recipients ==
The film directed by Sidney Lumet, 12 Angry Men, received the award in 1958. Stanley Kramer's movie Judgment at Nuremberg received the award in 1962, and To Kill a Mockingbird directed by Robert Mulligan was recognized with the award in 1963. In 1985, 391 candidates were entered in consideration to receive a Silver Gavel. In addition to 15 honorees recognized with Silver Gavel Awards in 1987, the American Bar Association also handed out 20 Certificates of Merit. In 1988, 298 organizations submitted 500 candidates for consideration for the Silver Gavel. A total of 12 awards were given out in 1996, in categories including literary works, pieces written in periodicals, journalism, plays, and writing for the screen. The 51st Silver Gavel Awards were announced by American Bar Association president William H. Neukom in Washington, D.C. at the National Press Club and included honorees The Denver Post, The Dallas Morning News, and Jeffrey Toobin for his book The Nine: Inside the Secret World of the Supreme Court. In 1962 Emilie Tavel was the first woman to receive the award.

== Reception ==
The News & Observer noted, "The ... Silver Gavel Awards are considered the premier honors for law-related publications and productions." The Pittsburgh Post-Gazette characterized the honor as the "top media award" of the American Bar Association.

== See also ==
- Burton Awards for Legal Achievement
- Fernand Collin Prize for Law
- Gruber Prize for Justice
- Helmuth-James-von-Moltke-Preis
- Harrison Tweed Award
- William J. Brennan Award
- William O. Douglas Prize
- Yorke Prize
