= Alden Todd =

Author

Alden Todd (January 12, 1918 – March 8, 2006) was an American author. His works included Finding Facts Fast, (Note: When searching Alden Todd's Finding Facts Fast for a term, e.g., Bowker use Internet Archives User Interface, such as the Magnifying glass in the margin on the left: type in 'Bowker' to find two results: (twice yearly) International Books in Print, Bowker, New York, 1989 (on page 96) and; Ulrich's International Periodicals Directory, 1989 edition Bowker, London, New York (on page 97) and; Bowker, London, New York Walford's Guide to Reference Material, Walford, A. (Ed) in the Notes on page 106) a popular guide on library research, released in several editions (from 1972 to 1992) prior to the emergence of the World Wide Web. In 1965, Alden Todd won a Silver Gavel Award from the American Bar Association, for his book Justice on Trial: The Case of Louis D. Brandeis.

== Published works ==
- Minding the Money: A Practical Guide for Volunteer Treasurers, iUniverse, 2003, ISBN 9780595272624
- Finding Facts Fast, first edition: 1972; latest edition: Ten Speed Press, 1992, 160 pages, ISBN 9780140512038
- Richard Montgomery: Rebel of 1775, D. McKay Co., 1967
- A Spark Lighted in Portland: The Record of the National Board of Fire Underwriters, McGraw-Hill, 1966
- Justice on Trial: The Case of Louis D. Brandeis, McGraw-Hill, 1964, ISBN 9781111360665
- Abandoned: The Story of the Greely Arctic Expedition 1881-1884, McGraw-Hill, 1961, ISBN 1-889963-29-1
