= Green Apple =

Green Apple may refer to:

- List of apple cultivars
  - Granny Smith, a cultivar of green apples
- Green Apple Books & Music, a bookstore in San Francisco, U.S.
- Green Apple Music & Arts Festival, an American festival
- Mrs. Green Apple, a Japanese band

== See also ==
- Green Apple Quick Step, an American band
