= Krzyżowa, Świdnica County =

Krzyżowa
- Village
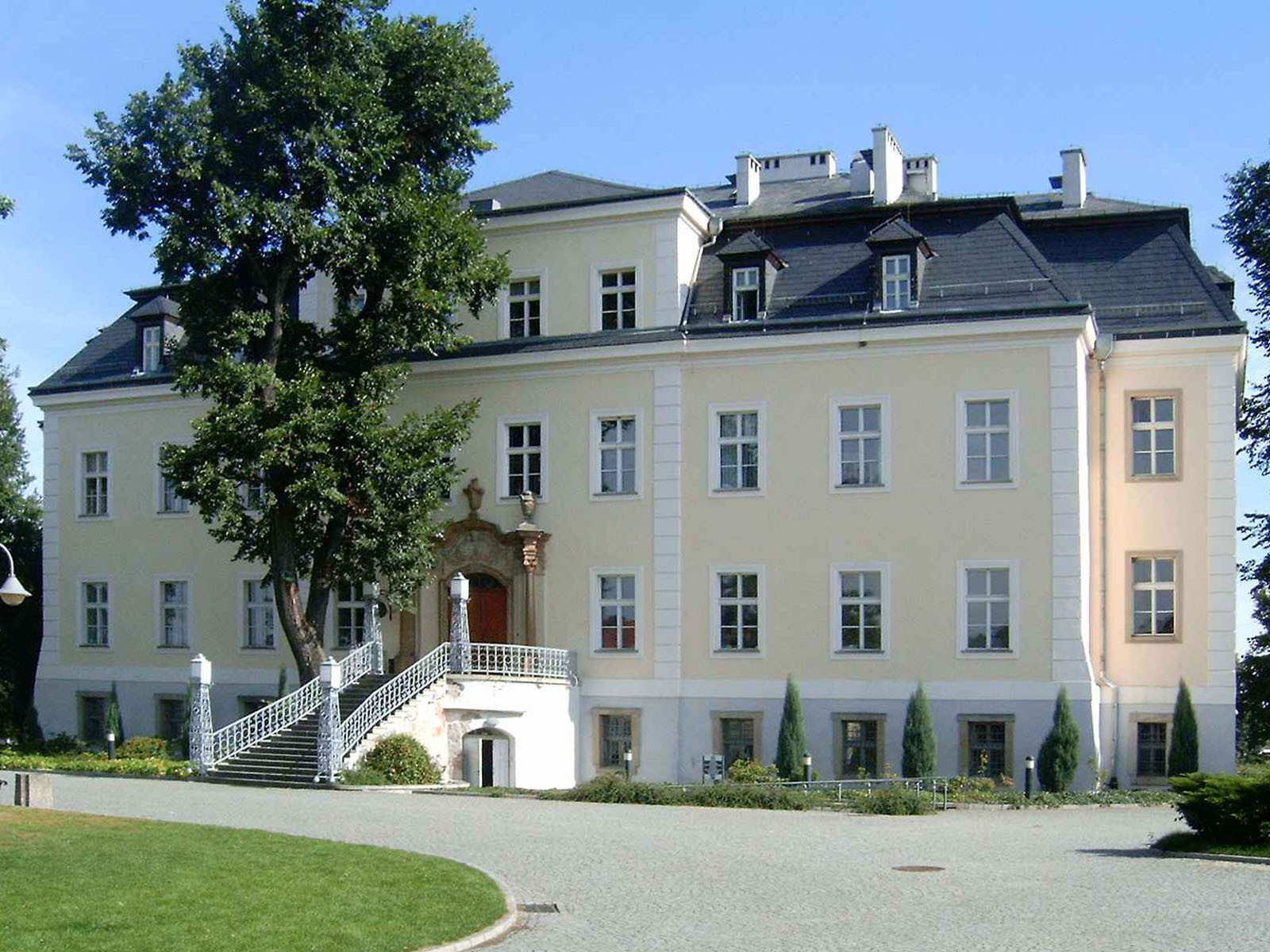
- The von Moltke estate

- Location within Poland
- Coordinates: 50°47′58″N 16°32′04″E
- Country: Poland
- Voivodeship: Lower Silesian
- County: Świdnica
- Gmina: Gmina Świdnica
- First mentioned: 1250
- Elevation: 230 m (750 ft)
- Population (approx.): 220
- Time zone: UTC+1 (CET)
  - Summer (DST): UTC+2 (CEST)
- Vehicle registration: DSW

Krzyżowa [kʂɨˈʐɔva] (German: Kreisau, until 1930: Creisau) is a village in the administrative district of Gmina Świdnica, within Świdnica County, Lower Silesian Voivodeship, in southwestern Poland.

The village is the site of an International Youth Meeting Centre, which primarily brings Polish and German young people together for dialogue and educational programs.

== History ==
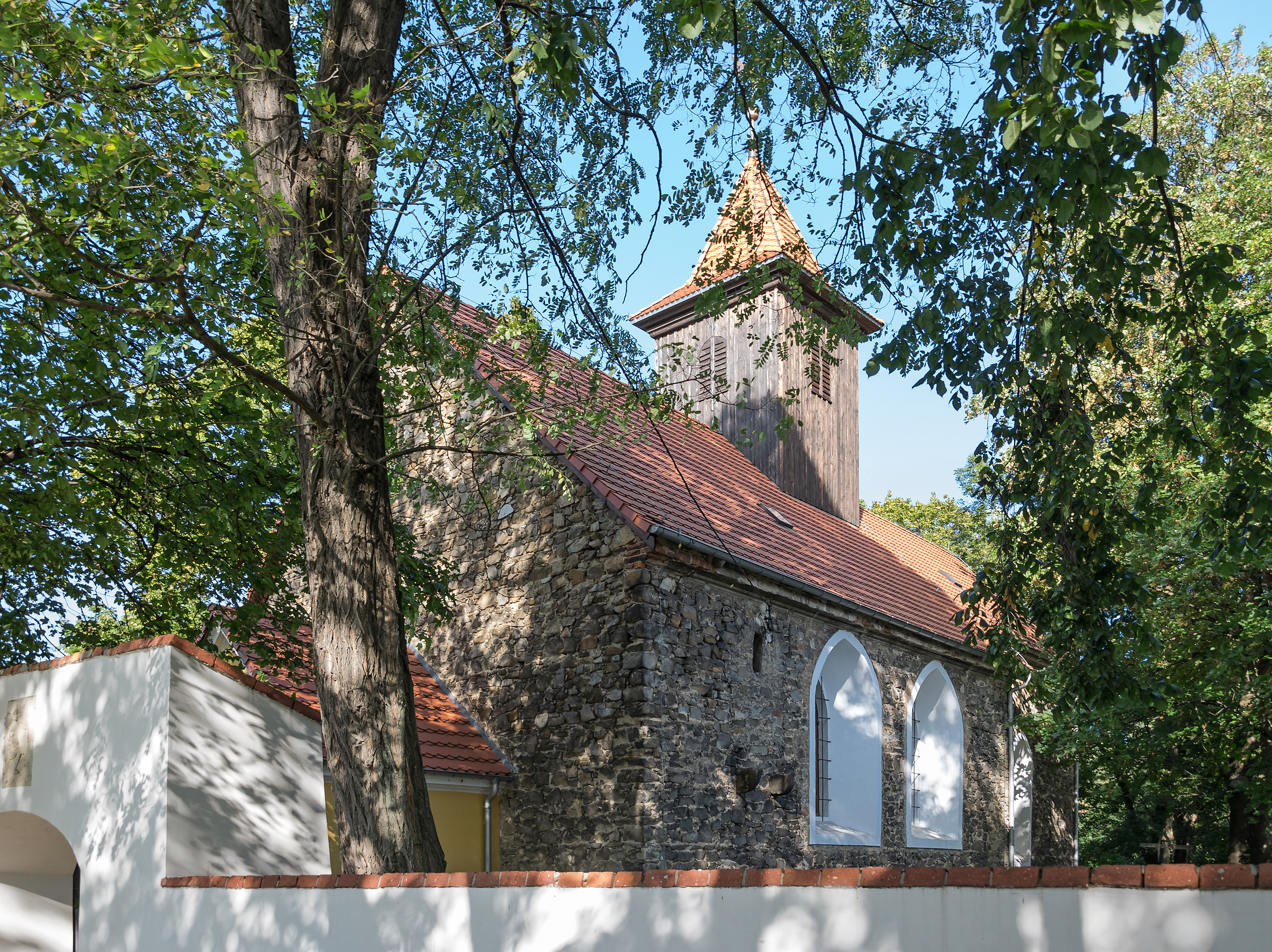
Medieval Saint Michael Archangel church

Map of Kreisau and surroundings (c. 1780)

The settlement was first mentioned in 1250 as Krzyzovo, when it was part of fragmented Piast-ruled Poland. Its name is of Polish origin and comes from the word krzyż, which means "cross". In a 1335 deed, when located in the Piast-ruled Duchy of Jawor-Świdnica, it was mentioned under the Latinized name Crissovo.

Like most of Silesia, the Krzyżowa area had been annexed by the Prussian king Frederick the Great after the First Silesian War in 1742. The manor was purchased by the Prussian field marshal Helmuth von Moltke the Elder after the Austro-Prussian War of 1866, and from that time on this extensive property was the family seat of the Moltke noble family until 1945. The members of the anti-Nazi resistance group Kreisau Circle met on the property, hosted by Helmuth von Moltke's great-grandnephew Helmuth James Graf von Moltke, who was executed for treason against Germany in January 1945.

After World War II the property was used as a farm, and still today the single houses carry names like cowshed or stable. On 12 November 1989, the Polish Prime Minister Tadeusz Mazowiecki and the German Federal Chancellor Helmut Kohl held a reconciliation meeting there and decided to redevelop the property as an International Youth Meeting Centre. The renovation was predominantly financed by the "Endowment for German-Polish Understanding". In 1998 the centre was officially opened. Those attending the opening ceremony included the widow of Helmuth James Graf von Moltke, Freya von Moltke, and the initiator Helmut Kohl. The center is known as the Międzynarodowe Centrum Spotkań Młodzieży in Polish, and as the Internationale Jugendbegegnungsstätte Kreisau in German.

The property has several hectares of grounds, many comfortable guestrooms for youth groups as well as for private guests, a dining room (in a former cowshed), a cafeteria, sports rooms and sports fields, conference rooms (with simultaneous translation arrangement) as well as party rooms (with table tennis and pool). A restored castle containing an exhibition on the Kreisau Circle is also located there.

== People ==
- Helmuth James von Moltke (1907-1945), German jurist and resistance activist

== See also ==
- Internationale Jugendbegegnungsstätte Kreisau (German article about the centre).
- International Youth Meeting Center in Oświęcim/Auschwitz (a second youth meeting center in Poland).
- Międzynarodowe Centrum Spotkań Młodzieży (Polish article about the centre).
