= Doris Henderson Causey =

American judge

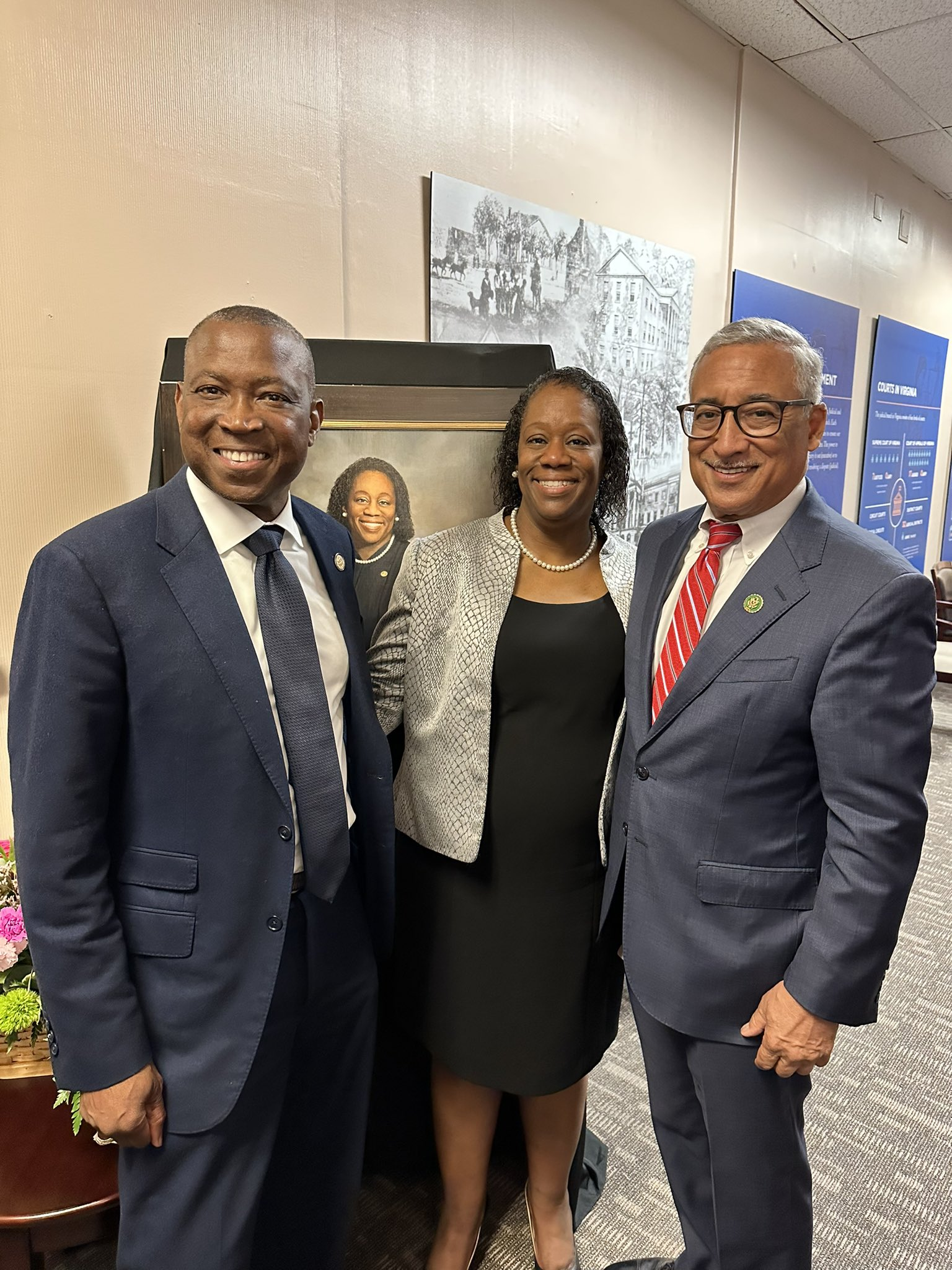
- Causey in 2023 with Don Scott and Bobby Scott

Judge of the Court of Appeals of Virginia
- Incumbent
- Assumed office September 1, 2021
- Appointed by: Virginia General Assembly

Personal details
- Spouse: Tracy Causey
- Children: 3
- Education: University of Mississippi (BA); Thurgood Marshall School of Law (JD)

Doris Henderson Causey is an American judge of the Court of Appeals of Virginia. She previously worked as a legal aid attorney and was the first African-American to serve as President of the Virginia State Bar.

== Early life and education ==
Causey was raised in Oxford, Mississippi. She attended the University of Mississippi, where her mother was the first African-American professor in the school's Department of Education. After receiving a bachelor's degree, Causey attended Thurgood Marshall School of Law at Texas Southern University.

== Career ==
Causey became the managing attorney at the Richmond office of the Central Virginia Legal Aid Society.

In 2015, Causey was named a "Leader in the Law" by Virginia Lawyers Weekly. The same year she announced her bid for president-elect of the Virginia State Bar. She ran unopposed, and in August 2017, Causey became the first African-American and first legal aid lawyer to serve as president of the bar association.

In 2019, in recognition for her work with Central Virginia Legal Aid, Causey was given the Hill-Tucker Public Service Award by the Richmond Bar Association.

In 2021, Causey was elected to the Court of Appeals of Virginia.
