= Kreisau Circle =

Group of German anti-Nazi dissidents

The Kreisau Circle signet

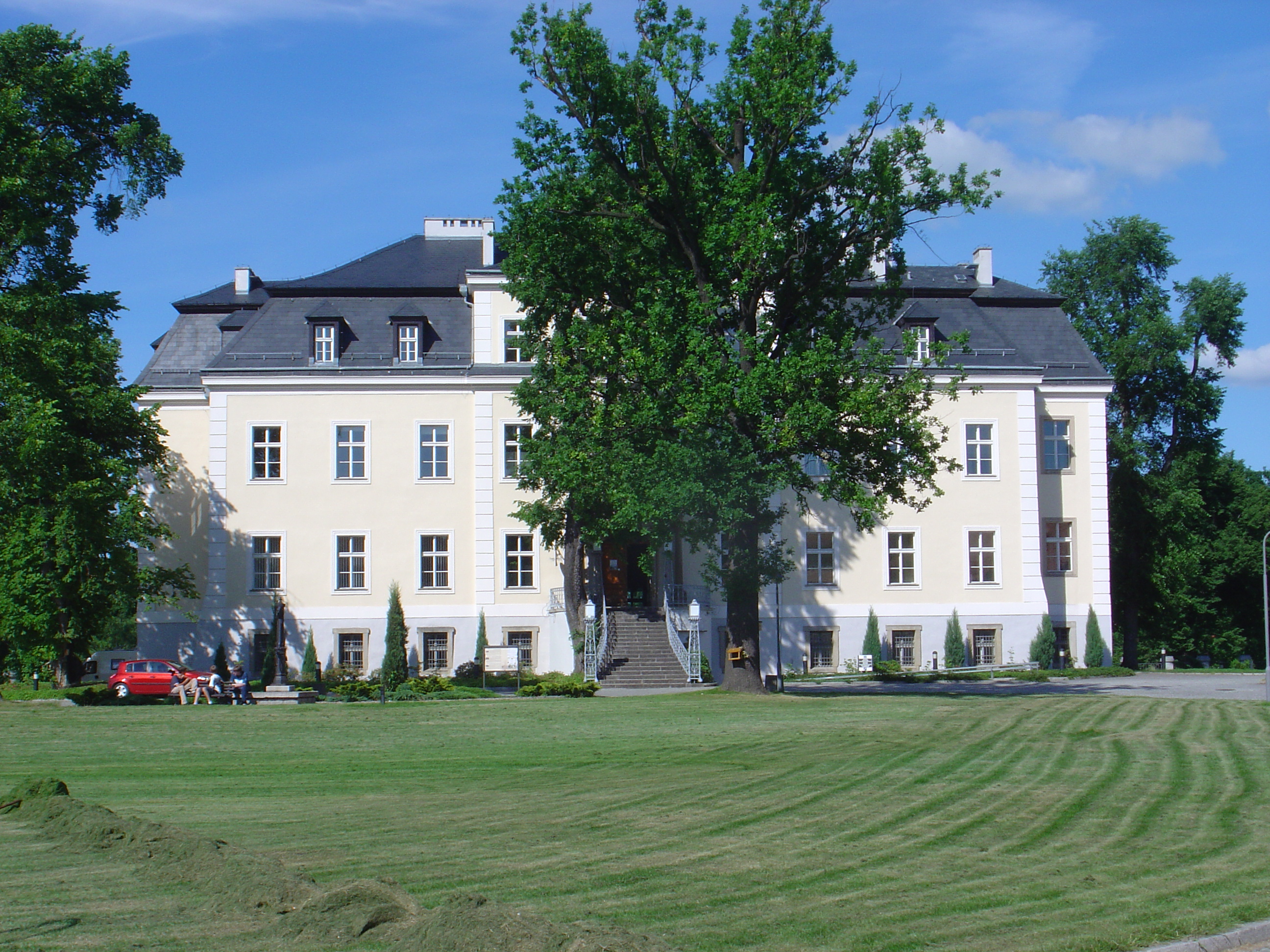
The von Moltke estate in Kreisau, Silesia

The Kreisau Circle (German: Kreisauer Kreis, pronounced [ˌkʁaɪ̯.zaʊ̯.ɐ ˈkʁaɪ̯s]) (1940–1944) was a group of about twenty-five German dissidents in Nazi Germany led by jurist and nobleman Helmuth James von Moltke, who met up from 1940 at the historic Moltke estate in the rural town of Kreisau, Silesia (today Krzyżowa). The circle was composed of men and women from a variety of backgrounds, including those of noble descent, devout Protestants and Catholics, intellectuals, military personnel, socialists and conservatives. Despite their differences, the members of the Kreisau Circle found common interest in their opposition to Hitler's regime on moral and religious grounds. At their meetings, the circle discussed how they would reorganize the German government after the end of the Third Reich.

Although the circle did not promote violent overthrow of the regime, their planning was considered by the Nazis to be treasonous as it rested on the assumption that Germany would lose the war. The group began to falter after Helmuth von Moltke was arrested by the Gestapo in January 1944 and eventually came to an end when most of its members were arrested following Claus von Stauffenberg's attempt on Hitler's life on 20 July 1944.

== Intellectual background ==
The members of the Kreisau Circle were heavily influenced by popular movements in Germany that followed World War I, most notably the German Youth Movement and German religious socialism. Although motivated by differing ideologies (the German Youth Movement in a return to nature and religious socialism in a return to Christian values), each faction inspired resistance to the Nazi regime by encouraging their followers to reconsider traditionally rigid political, social, and religious distinctions and engage in discourse with those who disagreed with them. These fundamental similarities created an environment that allowed for persons of a variety of backgrounds to meet and participate in intellectual resistance to the Third Reich.

=== German Youth Movement ===
The German Youth Movement was characterized by the creation of various youth organizations that emphasized a return to nature since 1896. For example, the Wandervogel, a youth movement that arose in the early 20th century, encouraged youth to reject their middle-class upbringings that overemphasized materialism. The movement stressed the importance of the individual and emboldened them to pursue their interests rather than follow traditional class expectations.

Many members of the German youth groups were sent to war in 1914. Following great losses during the war, young men found themselves fascinated with Volkish ideology, the idea of reunification of the German people that transcended class distinctions. The preoccupation with the Volk made for an easy transition for some into Nazi ideology, but for others, such as Helmuth von Moltke, their roots in a youth movement that questioned the status quo led them to resist a regime that undermined the freedom which they sought through their youth organizations.

==== Löwenberger Arbeitsgemeinschaften (Löwenberger Working Groups) ====
An extension of the German Youth Movement, the Löwenberger Arbeitsgemeinschaften was an organization of college professors, youth movement leaders, unemployed workers, students, and farmers who came together to work in work camps and discuss social and political issues and solve the problems Silesia faced (i.e. high unemployment) in the aftermath of World War I. Between the days of 14 March and 1 April 1928, approximately one-hundred people from a variety of backgrounds came together for the first Silesian work camp. In the mornings, participants would partake in physical labour. This was followed by lecture courses, discussion groups, and leisure time. Two additional camps followed in 1929 and 1930. One participant described his time at the camps, "Representatives of the three social groups in the nation were able to achieve a common language that had proved beyond the grasp of the older generation. A group such as this, which formed a cross-section of the community, was capable of rising above class and party interests". The camp allowed participants to cooperate with people of different upbringings and discuss how they could work together for the common good of their community. This lesson that people of differing social classes and political views could collaborate successfully would greatly influence Helmuth James von Moltke in his construction of the Kreisau Circle, who himself was an important contributor to the Löwenberger movement.

=== Religious Socialism in Germany ===
Religious socialism in 20th-century Germany also influenced members of the Kreisau Circle. This movement is notably characterized by the work of Paul Tillich, who sought to fashion socialism into an ideology that was complementary with Christian faith. He looked to create "socialist political forms that were rooted in a religious substance". Tillich called this socialism "theonomous". Tillich emphasized the importance of social justice which he defined as "the demand for a society in which it is possible for every individual and for every group to live meaningfully and purposefully, a demand for a meaningful society".

Similarly to the youth movements, religious socialism challenged conventional political divisions. The movement asked followers not to focus on the differences between Christianity and socialism but rather see how the two could work together to create a better society. Prison chaplain Harald Poelchau, a member of the Kreisau Circle, was a close follower of Tillich, and other members such as Horst von Einsiedel, Carl-Dietrich von Trotha, Adolf Reichwein, and Adam von Trott zu Solz were also affiliated with religious socialism.

== Origins of the Circle ==
The Kreisau Circle was officially formed in 1940 with the merging of the intellectual circles of Helmuth James Graf von Moltke and Peter Graf Yorck von Wartenberg. Moltke and Yorck were descendants of prominent Prussian nobility and therefore were initially favored by Hitler's regime. Helmuth von Moltke, for example, descended from Field Marshal von Moltke, who was a prominent military commander in the Bismarck era. The Nazis honored his family title by giving him a position in their High Command. Despite this special treatment, both men felt morally obliged to resist Hitler. In 1938, both men began to form separate social circles in which they discussed the problems of the Reich and their hopes for Germany's future. Moltke's circle, which included Einsiedel, was largely preoccupied with the sociological and economic problems that Germany would face after the Reich fell. Yorck's circle, which began to meet frequently at his home, focused mostly on the administrative questions of how the government should run after Hitler's regime had ended. In January 1940, Moltke was connected to Yorck through a mutual friend. They both agreed that the Third Reich's defeat was inevitable and that a new government would have to be prepared to take over in this event. The two valued their common desire to oppose the regime through intellectual means despite differences in political views. The circle was formed in November 1940, against the backdrop of Hitler's successes in France.

== Members ==
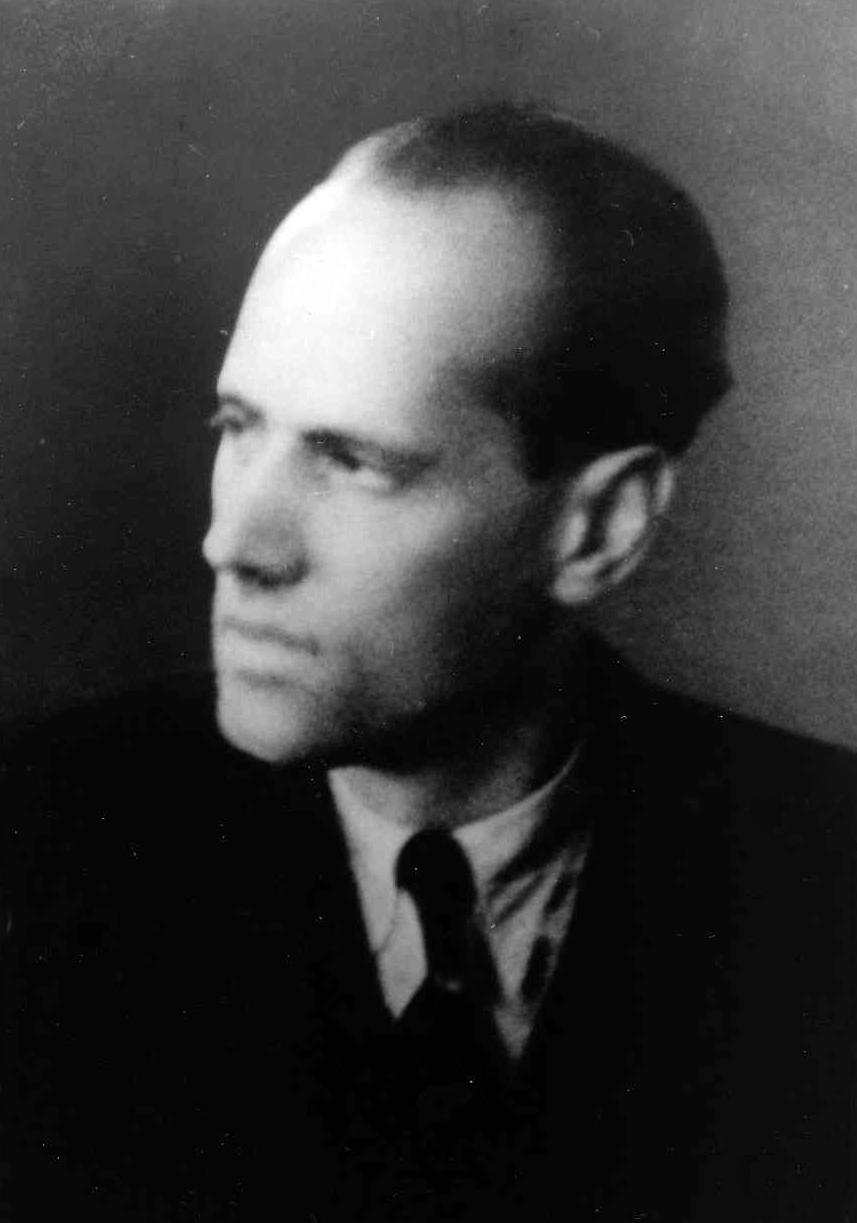
Helmuth James von Moltke, founder of the Kreisau Circle.

The membership of the Kreisau Circle was varied, with affiliates ranging from conservatives to socialists, religious and non-religious, and all of the above. Although Freya von Moltke, Helmuth von Moltke, Peter von Yorck and Marion von Yorck were at the center of the circle, the group was more of a network of friends than a formal organization. Freya von Moltke said her husband and Yorck searched for, "people who objected, who were opposed to National Socialism and were trying to envisage a better Germany beyond National Socialism, which at the time seemed completely impossible". Their differences were valued as Moltke and Yorck believed that debate would assist them to accomplish their common goal for a better Germany following "X-day", or the day after the end of the Reich.

=== Helmuth James Graf von Moltke ===
The Kreisau Circle's most notable member was Helmuth James Graf von Moltke, who was considered to be the leader of the organization. Moltke was born on 11 March 1907 in Kreisau, Silesia to one of Prussia's best known military families. The Moltke household encouraged discussion and debate. For instance, although both of Moltke's parents were Christian Scientists, he became an Evangelical Christian at the age of 14. He attended university from 1925 to 1929 and studied law and political science. During this time, he became an important leader of the Lowenberger Arbeitsgemeinschaften. He also found himself drawn to the Schwarzwald Circle in 1929, which was an intellectual discussion group led by Eugenie Schwarzwald, where he met his future wife, Freya Deichmann. Later that year, Helmuth was forced to return home from school to Kreisau to manage his family's estate. He married Freya on 18 October 1931. In 1932, the Kreisau Estate had been stabilized, allowing Helmuth to resume his career in law in Berlin. He eventually opened his own private firm along with his colleague Karl von Lewinski to practice international law. In this occupation, Moltke assisted Jewish émigrés to escape the Nazi regime despite the obvious threat that this presented to his own safety.

From 1935 to 1938, he spent time in England in hopes of joining the British bar. Although these plans were halted by the declaration of war in September 1939, it was during this time that Moltke gained many of his connections outside of Germany. He returned to Berlin and was drafted into the Abwehr, where he attempted to ensure adherence to international law. During this time, Moltke kept in contact with his friends from the Silesian work camps, such as Horst von Einsendel. They largely discussed sociological and economic consequences of the Third Reich. In January 1940, Moltke met Peter Graf Yorck von Wartenburg. By November 1940, the circles of Moltke and Yorck had merged to create the Kreisau Circle.

=== Peter Graf Yorck von Wartenburg ===
Peter Graf Yorck von Wartenburg was born on 13 November 1904 to a well-known family of Prussian nobles. The family emphasized the importance of scholarship and the arts and encouraged opposition to authority. Peter's father, Heinrich, called himself "His Majesty's most loyal opposition". Yorck studied law in Bonn and Breslau and during this time became critical of the failing republic. Following Kristallnacht in 1938 and a trip to Prague that made him realize the Nazis' imperialist intentions, Yorck became increasingly troubled with Hitler's regime and began to bring groups of dissenters to his home to discuss what was to be done after the fall of the Third Reich. Members of these initial groups would later become a part of the Kreisau Circle.

=== Women in the Kreisau Circle ===
The participation of women in the Kreisau Circle discussion was often limited to the presence of their husbands. Freya von Moltke, a founding participant, was cut off from the circle's correspondence following her husband Helmuth von Moltke's arrest. There are also no known female members who were not married to a male member. However, despite these limitations, women played an integral role in the Kreisau Circle. Margrit von Trotha, for example, utilized her skills as an economist to partake in the plans for Germany's future economy. In addition, in Marion Yorck von Wartenburg's memoirs, she refers to the circle as "our group", indicating that she was a part of the circle's membership and discourse. A known list of female members of the circle includes: Freya von Moltke (lawyer), Marion Yorck von Wartenburg (lawyer), Margrit von Trotha (economist), Rosemarie Reichwein (physician/therapist), and Irene Yorck von Wartenburg.

=== Other Protestant members ===
Additional Protestant members of the circle included Horst von Einsiedel, Carl-Dietrich von Trotha, Adolf Reichwein, Otto von der Gablentz, Theodor Steltzer, Adam von Trott, Hans-Bernd von Haeften, Harald Poelchau, and Eugen Gerstenmaier.

=== Catholic members ===
Catholic members included Hans Peters, Hans Lukaschek, Paulus van Husen, Augustin Rösch, Lothar König, and Alfred Delp.

=== Socialist members ===
Socialist members included Carlo Mierendorff, Theodor Haubach, and Julius Leber.

== Proposals for the future ==
The activities of the Kreisau Circle formed around the idea that the fall of the Third Reich was in the near future. The day after this day when the new government would need to take over was referred to as "Day X". This day would mark the beginning of a new Germany and the end of an historical era. Therefore, based on this assumption, the job of the Kreisau Circle was to prepare for this day. On 24 April 1941, the Kreisau Circle created a memorandum titled, Starting-point, Objectives and Tasks. In this text, the Circle expresses their belief that with the end of the Third Reich would also come the end of nationalism, racism, and party politics.

Although a general consensus existed regarding the imminent fall of the Third Reich, the question of what this reformed Germany would look like remained up for debate. According to Freya von Moltke, some of the most pressing questions that the group sought to answer were, "How can I make democrats out of Germans who had not been able, really, to run a democracy properly?" and "How to build a new economy and whether it should be free or not free".

In 1943, Moltke began to prepare formal drafts for a new German constitution to answer these questions. In a constitutional draft made on 9 August 1943, Moltke outlined a new Reich structure which would be self-governing and rest upon the, "natural divisions of the nation: family, municipality, and land". Basic freedoms were to be restored. Germany would become a federal state with a weak central government, divided into provinces of between 3 and 5 million people, the provinces would also be divided into self-governing communities, organised into districts. The regions would have parliaments elected by the district assemblies. The minimum voting age would be 27. The eligible voters, which Moltke defined as all persons over the age of 21 or have served in the military, would elect municipal and county representative assemblies. These district assemblies would then elect the regional legislature, which would have the responsibility of electing those in the Reichstag. In the realm of culture and education, Moltke emphasized the importance of a renewed relationship with the German Evangelical Church and the German Catholic Church. Moltke and other members in the circle wanted a restoration of Christian values that they felt had been lost and led to Hitler's regime. With the return of Christian values, the group believed that greater acceptance and cooperation between all peoples would occur and lead to the political unification of the European continent. However, this is not to be mistaken for intolerance of other religions, as Moltke emphasizes that in this new government, "The freedom of [religious] faith and conscience is guaranteed". Moltke hoped this government would create a unified Germany where freedom and personal responsibility would be complementary to order and leadership.

== End of the Kreisau Circle ==
=== Arrests in January 1944 ===
In the autumn of 1943, Helmuth von Moltke learned from an informant that a Gestapo spy had discovered an anti-Nazi salon in Berlin and that there would be a round-up of all participants. Moltke warned his friend who had been present at the salon, Otto Kiep, of the round-ups. Kiep, former German Consul General in New York and member of the Abwehr's counterintelligence department under Admiral Wilhelm Canaris, failed to escape and was arrested in January 1944. The Gestapo later discovered that von Moltke had warned him of the arrests, and Helmuth himself was then arrested on 19 January 1944. This left the Kreisau Circle without one of its integral members. Freya von Moltke was also ousted from the group following Helmuth's arrest as the members were worried she would be interrogated. During this time, Yorck struggled to maintain cohesion of the group. However, this was not the death knell of the circle as the Gestapo was not yet aware of the resistance. Prior to the attempted assassination of Adolf Hitler, Helmuth von Moltke was treated fairly in prison and allowed to correspond with his wife Freya.

=== 20 July 1944 attempt and executions ===
On 20 July 1944, a group of dissidents attempted to assassinate Hitler with a bomb and failed. Claus von Stauffenberg, cousin of Peter Yorck, was among the leading figures in this attempt to create "Day-X". However, the bombing only injured Hitler and led to a series of arrests. Peter Yorck was arrested and executed on 8 August 1944 for his involvement. Although Moltke himself was not involved, his close association with Yorck proved fatal as he was also executed on 23 January 1945. These arrests and executions signaled the formal end of the activities of the Kreisau Circle.

== Legacy ==
By May 1945, none of the measures established by the Kreisau Circle for Germany's democratisation, de-Nazification, disestablishment of racism, and internationalisation were implemented. Instead, Nazi Germany came under the Allies control rather than transitioning under their planned leadership.

Many of the surviving members of the circle continued to remain active after the war. For example, Marion Yorck received a judgeship in Berlin and Rosemarie Reichwein began her own physical therapy clinic. In addition, Freya von Moltke transformed the Kreisau estate into the Krzyzowa Foundation for Mutual Understanding in Europe on 10 July 1990. The foundation inspired its work based off the Kreisau Circle, with aims to develop a relationship between individuals from different social, political, and cultural backgrounds.

== See also ==
- Solf Circle (Frau Solf Tea Party)
