= Green Apple Books & Music =

Bookstore in San Francisco

Green Apple Books
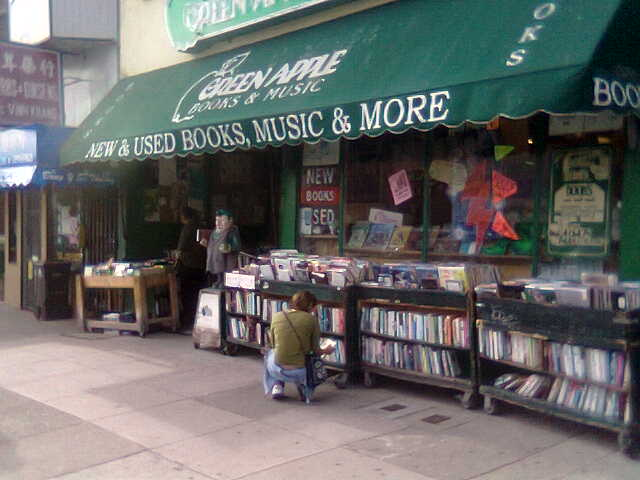
- Main store entrance.

- Location within San Francisco County

General information
- Type: Commercial
- Location: 506 Clement St. San Francisco, California
- Coordinates: 37.7831°N 122.4647°W

Green Apple Books is an independent bookstore in the Richmond District of San Francisco, California.

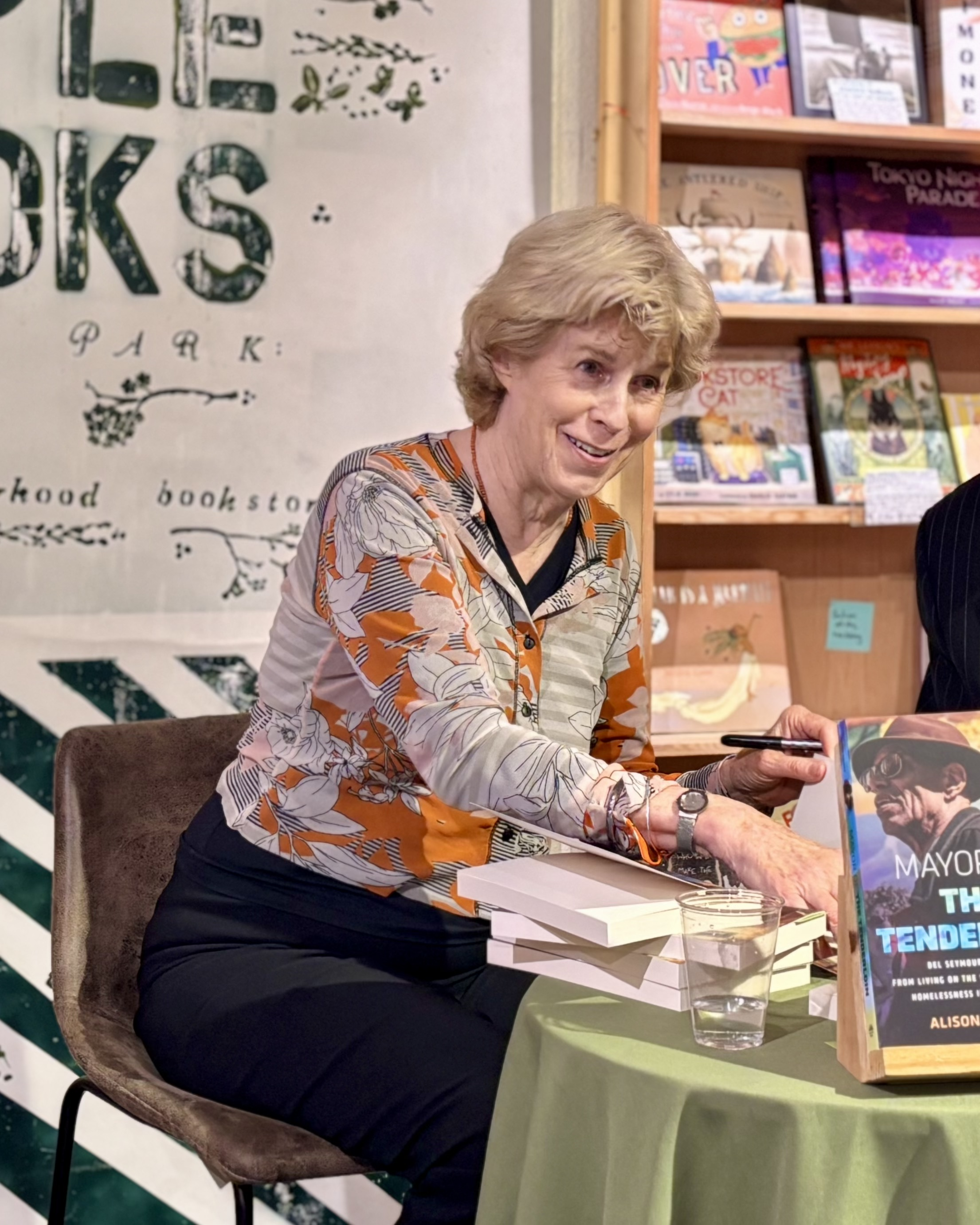
Book signing at Green Apple Books on the Park in September 2025 with author Alison Owings

== History ==
Green Apple Books was founded by Richard Savoy in 1967 in a pre-1906 building at the corner of Clement Street and Sixth Avenue. In 1996, Green Apple Books acquired its long-time neighbor, Revolver Records. By 2005, the store housed over 250,000 titles, as well as 60,000 available online.

After 30 years, Richard Savoy proposed a ten-year buy-out plan in 1997 for Green Apple Books & Music with three long-time employees, with the sale completing in 2008.

In 2014, Green Apple partnered with Le Video store on 9th Ave. The store was renamed Green Apple Books on the Park. The downstairs was turned into a Green Apple bookstore while the upstairs remained a video rental store (100,000 titles). This location hosts almost all of the author talks and events for Green Apple.

In 2019, Green Apple bought the bookstore Browser Books on Fillmore Street, keeping the Browser name. The expansions helped the bookstores to stay afloat amid the death-by-digital struggle of book retailers by scaling up.

In 2021, Green Apple downsized the Clement Street store back to its original pre-1996 size, cutting back its inventory of DVDs, magazines, records and gifts.

In 2024, A Green Apple location opened inside San Francisco International Airport in Terminal 1.

In 2026, the Green Apple Books on the Park location opened its upstairs to a coworking and social space for writers.

== Reception ==
In 2001, San Francisco Chronicle described it as a "wonderfully creaky maze of a store."

Green Apple Books was voted "Best Used Books Store" by the SF Weekly editorial staff in 2005 and the readers of the San Francisco Bay Guardian in 2006.

Green Apple Books was named Publishers Weekly's best bookstore of 2014.

Nicole Clark described Green Apple in The Bold Italic as the opposite of a big-box store, that was enjoyable to spend time in and discover new books.

The Frisc credited its 'disheveled charm' as a factor in its longevity.
