= Legal Aid Justice Center =

Non-profit in Virginia, United States

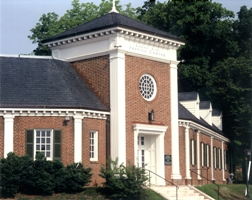
- Front entrance to the Legal Aid Justice Center
- Formation: 1967
- Headquarters: Charlottesville, Virginia
- Region served: Charlottesville, Virginia, Richmond, Virginia, Falls Church, Virginia, and Petersburg, Virginia
- Website: www.justice4all.org

The Legal Aid Justice Center is a Virginia based non-profit organization which provides legal services and advocacy to low income individuals. It was founded in 1967 when its Charlottesville office was opened. It has three other offices, in Falls Church (serving Northern Virginia), Petersburg, and Richmond.

== History ==
The Legal Aid Justice Center grew out of the Charlottesville-Albemarle Legal Aid Society (CALAS), which was founded in 1967 by a group of Charlottesville attorneys in response to a perceived need for legal services for disadvantaged members of the community. CALAS received federal funding from the Office of Economic Opportunity in 1970, and local funding from the City of Charlottesville and Albemarle County in 1982. CALAS also began bringing in private attorneys to provide legal services for community members in 1984.

In 1998, the board of CALAS assisted in the creation of Piedmont Legal Services, an organization that would exclusively provide services that were eligible for federal funding, but that would continue to share board members with CALAS. CALAS then turned its focus towards community needs that were ineligible for federal funding and began raising funds from private individuals and organizations.

In 2001, CALAS merged with Southside Virginia Legal Services in Petersburg, Virginia, to form the Legal Aid Justice Center. In the same year, Piedmont Legal Services merged with other legal aid offices in Falls Church, Virginia, and Richmond, Virginia, to create the Central Virginia Legal Aid Society. The LAJC followed its sister organization and expanded to provide its non-federally funded services in these areas.

== Client services and advocacy programs ==
The Legal Aid Justice Center's programs focus primarily on legal services which are ineligible for federal funding, while the Central Virginia Legal Aid Society works exclusively on programs which are eligible for federal funds.

=== Civil Advocacy Program ===
The Civil Advocacy Program serves low-income community members with a variety of non-criminal legal services. Civil Advocacy covers cases in consumer protection, employment discrimination, housing rights, mental health laws, and access to public benefits.

=== JustChildren Program ===
The JustChildren program was established in 1998 to address issues in Virginia's public education, juvenile justice, and foster care systems. The program uses a variety of methods, including direct representation of clients, community education and organizing, and legislative advocacy.

=== Immigrant Advocacy Program ===
The Immigrant Advocacy Program again uses a combination of legislative advocacy, public education, and representation of individual clients to improve the condition of immigrant workers in Virginia. Since its establishment in 1998, Immigrant Advocacy has settled cases for over $2 million to immigrant laborers in unpaid wages.

Beginning in 2017, LAJC has expanded efforts to serve the thousands of immigrant farmworkers living in isolated areas throughout Virginia. LAJC meets workers at the labor camps, mobile home parks and motels where those who pick, pack and process Virginia’s crops reside, sometimes for only a few months each year. Physical isolation, language barriers and insecure immigration status make farmworkers particularly vulnerable to exploitation, through wage theft, labor trafficking and other offenses.

=== Elder Law Initiative ===
Building off of the model established by the JustChildren and Immigrant Advocacy Programs, the Elder Law Initiative uses advocacy, community education, and direct representation to improve the condition of Virginians in elder care facilities. The initiative works with individual facilities, organizes family councils, and informs individual residents and their families about their legal rights. The initiative also works with the University of Virginia Health System to conduct research in local facilities to identify issues and formulate ways to improve elder care in the region.

=== Medical-Legal Partnership ===
The Medical-Legal Partnership is a joint effort between the University of Virginia Children's Hospital, the University of Virginia Law School, and LAJC. The program provides legal counseling to families and consultation, training, and resources to health care providers in the region. The program is sponsored by a grant from the Jessie Ball duPont Fund.

=== Virginia Institutionalized Persons Project ===
The Virginia Institutionalized Persons Project was created in 2007 and focuses on specific areas of advocacy to improve conditions for inmates in Virginia's prison system. For example, in 2011 the project worked on a class action suit involving Virginia's parole laws. In 2009, the program began researching the healthcare within the prison system, and has since begun advocating for reforms.

=== Clinical programs ===
The LAJC works with the University of Virginia Law School to create legal clinic programs that involve law students with its various service areas. Clinic topics include housing law, mental health, employment law, elderly advocacy, family resources, immigration law, and child advocacy.

== Fundraising programs ==
The LAJC's major fundraiser is an annual film screening hosted by one of its major supporters, author John Grisham.
