= Fernand Collin =

Belgian businessman (1897–1990)

Fernand Collin (Antwerp, 18 December 1897 – 11 December 1990), was a Belgian businessman. He was president of the Kredietbank from 1938 to 1973 and was also a professor at the Catholic University of Leuven.

At the start of World War II, Fernand Collin, together with Alexandre Galopin (Société Générale de Belgique) and Max-Léo Gérard (Banque de Bruxelles) were given a mandate to manage the Belgian economy during the war. Paul-Henri Spaak told them in May 1940 Nous vous confions la Belgique (E: We trust you with Belgium).

He was CEO of the pudding producing company Imperial Products, which merged in 1968 with Devos Lemmens into Continental Foods (it was sold to Campbell Soup in 1985). In 1962, he published an article in the Yale Law Journal, where in a note on the Unit of Account he expanded on the idea of a European currency in order to revitalize the international money markets.

== Awards ==
- 1971: Joost van den Vondelprijs

== See also ==
- Fernand Collin Prize for Law

== Sources ==
- Fernand Collin
- Vandeputte Robert, Fernand Collin en zijn tijd, Tielt, Lannoo, 1985
