= Freya von Moltke =

German writer and scholar (1911–2010)

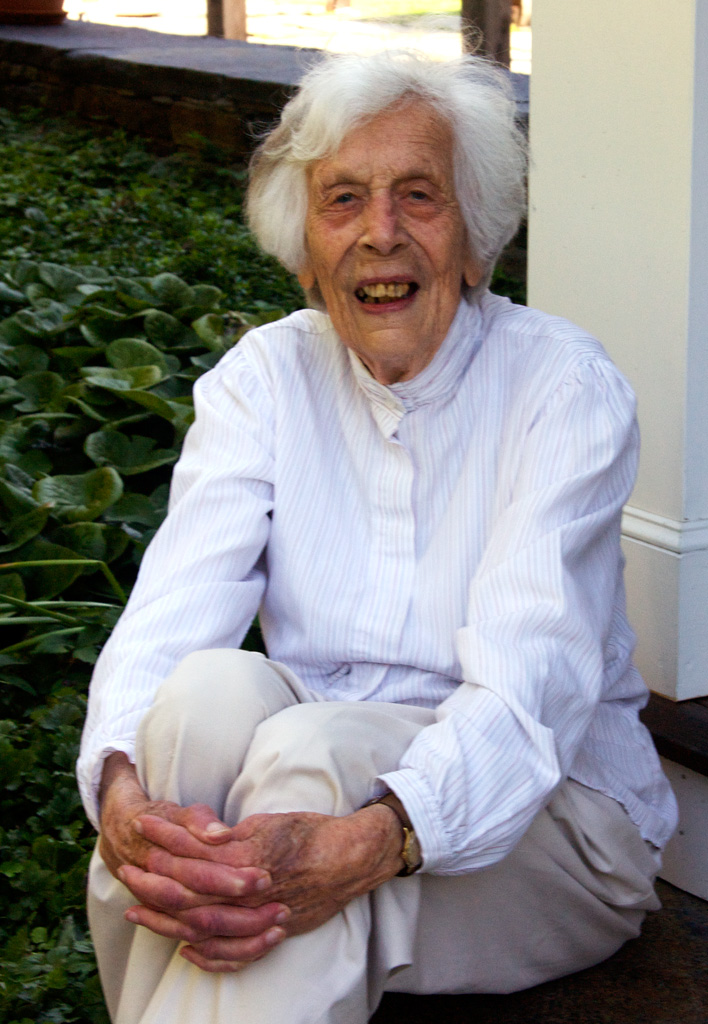
- Moltke in 2009
- Born: Freya Deichmann; 29 March 1911; Cologne, Germany
- Died: 1 January 2010 (aged 98); Norwich, Vermont, United States
- Education: Doctor of Law, Humboldt University of Berlin
- Occupations: Scholar, author, speaker
- Known for: Chronicling her husband's role in the Kreisau Circle's non-violent opposition to Nazism during World War II.
- Spouse: Helmuth James Ludwig Eugen Heinrich Graf von Moltke
- Children: Helmuth Caspar, Konrad
- Parent(s): Ada & Carl Theodor Deichmann
- Relatives: Hans Deichmann, Carl Deichmann

Freya von Moltke (née Deichmann; 29 March 1911 – 1 January 2010) was a German American lawyer and participant in the anti-Nazi opposition group, the Kreisau Circle, with her husband, Helmuth James von Moltke. During World War II, her husband acted to subvert German human-rights abuses of people in territories occupied by Germany and became a founding member of the Kreisau Circle, whose members opposed the government of Adolf Hitler.

The Nazi government executed her husband for treason, he having discussed with the Kreisau Circle group the prospects for a Germany based on moral and democratic principles that could develop after Hitler. Moltke preserved her husband's letters that detailed his activities during the war, and chronicled events from her perspective. She supported the founding of a center for international understanding at the former Moltke estate in Krzyżowa, Świdnica County, Poland (formerly Kreisau, Germany).

== Early life and education ==
Moltke was born Freya Deichmann in Cologne, Germany, the daughter of banker Carl Theodor Deichmann and his wife, Ada Deichmann (née von Schnitzler). In 1930, she began studying law at the University of Bonn and attended seminars at the University of Breslau. While working as a researcher she met her future husband Helmuth James von Moltke.

On 18 October 1931, the two married in her home town of Cologne. The couple initially resided in a modest house at the Moltke family's Kreisau estate in Silesia (German: Schlesien), then Germany, post WWII part of Poland. They moved to Berlin so her husband could complete his legal training. She studied law in Berlin and received a Juris Doctor degree from Friedrich Wilhelm University of Berlin in 1935.

== Pre-war Kreisau, 1935–1939 ==
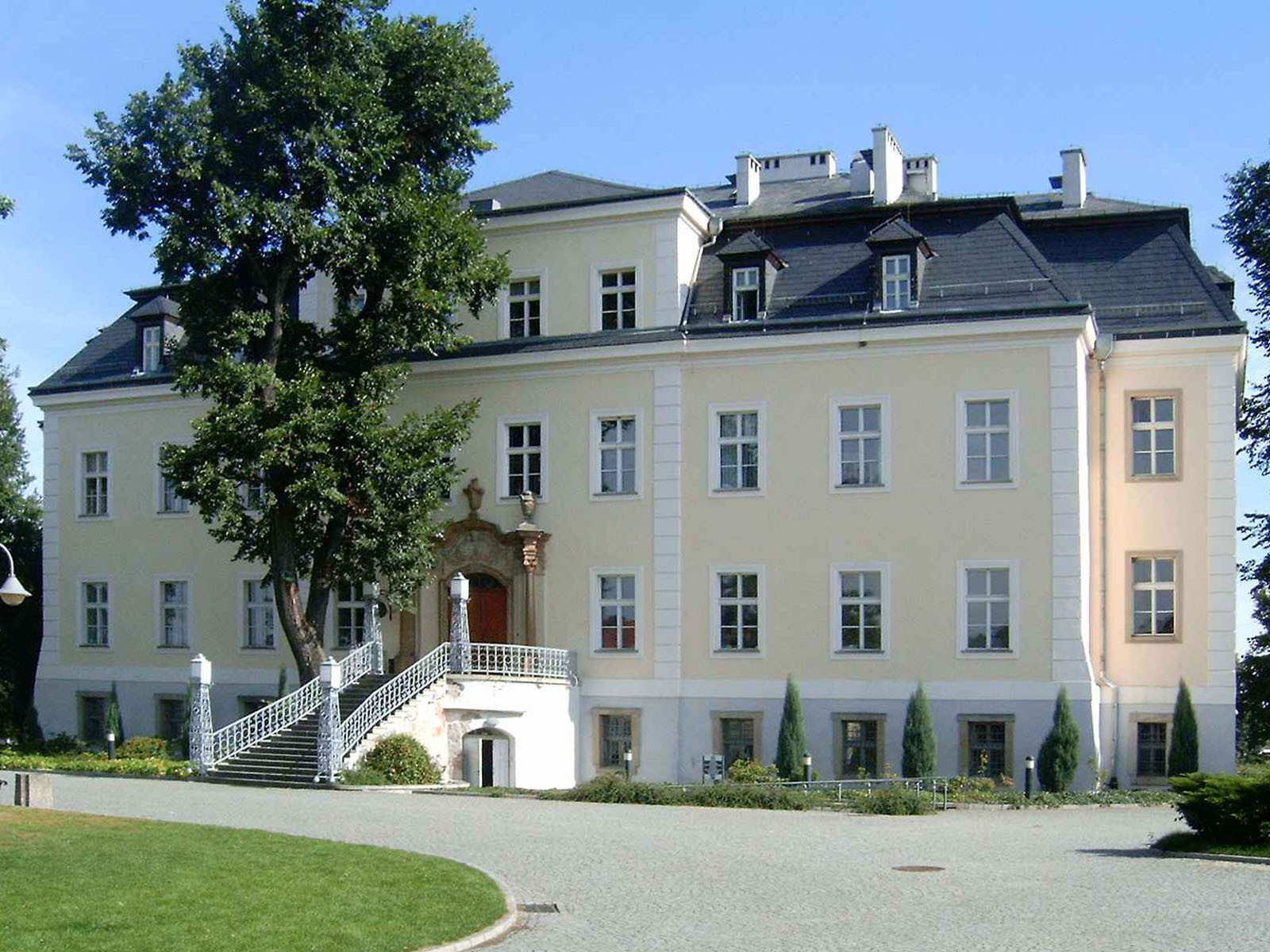
The main house of the Moltke estate at Kreisau

Following her law studies, Moltke visited summers at her husband's estate in Kreisau, where he had actively managed the farming activities, a pursuit atypical of a German nobleman, before retaining an overseer. She joined work on the farm, while her husband started an international law practice in Berlin and studied to become an English barrister.

In 1933, Adolf Hitler, became chancellor of Germany, which Moltke's husband foresaw would be a disaster for Germany, not the transitory figure that others expected. The Moltkes encouraged their overseer to join the Nazi Party to shield the community of Kreisau from government interference.

In 1937, Moltke gave birth to their first son, Helmuth Caspar. Thereafter, she lived at Kreisau year-round. Her husband inherited the Kreisau estate in 1939.

== Wartime Kreisau 1939–1945 ==
In 1939, World War II began with the German invasion of Poland and Moltke's husband was immediately "drafted at the beginning of the Polish campaign by the High Command of the Armed Forces, Counter-Intelligence Service, Foreign Division, as an expert in martial law and international public law."

In his travels through German-occupied countries, her husband observed many human rights abuses, which he attempted to thwart by insisting that Germany observe the Geneva Convention and through local actions in creating more benign outcomes for local inhabitants, citing legal principles.

In October 1941, her husband wrote, "Certainly more than a thousand people are murdered in this way every day, and another thousand German men are habituated to murder.... What shall I say when I am asked: And what did you do during that time?" In the same letter he said, "Since Saturday the Berlin Jews are being rounded up. Then they are sent off with what they can carry.... How can anyone know these things and walk around free?" In 1941 Moltke gave birth to their second son, Konrad, at Kreisau.

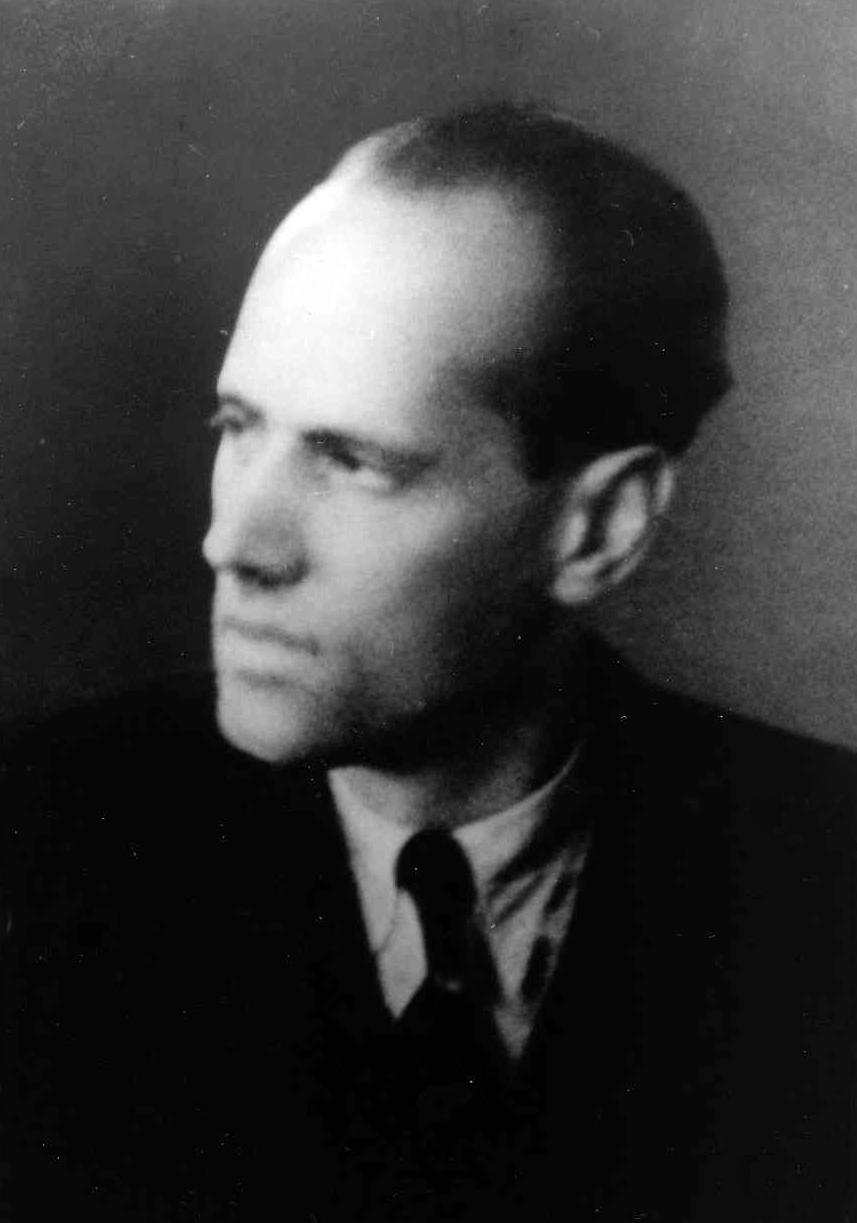
Helmuth James von Moltke before the People's Court in 1945

In Berlin, Moltke's husband had a circle of acquaintances who opposed Nazism and who met frequently there, but on three occasions met at Kreisau. These three incidental gatherings were the basis for the term "Kreisau Circle." The meetings at Kreisau had an agenda of well-organized discussion topics, starting with relatively innocuous ones as cover. The topics of the first meeting of May 1942 included the failure of German educational and religious institutions to fend off the rise of Nazism. The theme of the second meeting in the fall of 1942 was on post-war reconstruction, assuming the likely defeat of Germany. This included both economic planning and self-government, developing a pan-European concept that pre-dated the European Union. The third meeting, in June of 1943, addressed how to handle the legacy of Nazi war crimes after the fall of the dictatorship. These and other meetings resulted in "Principles for the New [Post-Nazi] Order" and "Directions to Regional Commissioners" that her husband asked Moltke to hide in a place that not even he knew.

On 19 January 1944, the Gestapo arrested Moltke's husband for warning an acquaintance of that person's impending arrest. She was allowed to visit him under benign conditions and found that he could continue to work and receive papers. On 20 July 1944, there was an attempt on Hitler's life, which the Gestapo used as a pretext to eliminate perceived opponents to the Nazi regime. In January 1945, Helmuth von Moltke was tried, convicted, and executed by a Gestapo "People's Court" for treason, having discussed with the Kreisau Circle group the prospects for a Germany based on moral and democratic principles that could develop after Hitler.

== Fleeing Kreisau 1945 ==
In the spring of 1945 Moltke and another Kreisau widow had evacuated their families to Czechoslovakia to avoid the Russian offensive, which ultimately bypassed Kreisau. After the fall of Berlin on 2 May 1945, the Russians sent a small detachment to occupy Kreisau. Using improvised notes in Russian and Czech, she obtained safe passage for both families to return to Kreisau from hiding. A Russian company was billeted at the Moltke estate to "supervise the harvest" during the summer of 1945. When the Poles began to occupy the small farms, vacated by Germans, the Russians became protectors of the occupants of the Moltke estate.

After a trip to Berlin, where she met Allen Dulles and received American rations for a difficult return trip to Silesia to retrieve her children, Moltke followed the advice of Gero von Schulze-Gaevernitz to leave Kreisau. Gaevernitz was an American officer, who came to inspect conditions in Silesia. Moltke gave him for safekeeping the letters that her husband had written to her, which she had hidden from the Nazis in her beehives. Thanks to British friends of her husband, emissaries from the British Embassy in Poland arranged for her evacuation from Poland.

== Transitions, 1945–2010 ==
Moltke pictured in a 1949 brochure for a speaking tour in the United States.

After World War II, Moltke publicized her husband's ideas and actions during the war, to serve as an example of principled opposition. As early as 1949 she traveled to the United States to lecture on "Germany: Past and present", "Germany: Totalitarianism versus democracy", "German youth and the new education", and "Women's position in the new Germany".

After her escape from Silesia, Moltke moved to South Africa, where she settled with her two young sons, Caspar and Konrad. She worked as a social worker and a therapist for disabilities.

In 1956, unable to further tolerate Apartheid, she returned to Berlin where she commenced her work in publicizing the Kreisau Circle. Her effort was supported by Eugen Gerstenmaier, then president of the Bundestag, among others.

In 1960, she moved to Norwich, Vermont, to join the social philosopher, Eugen Rosenstock-Huessy, who died in 1973. In 1986, at the age of 75, Moltke became a United States citizen to pursue her interest in participating in the U.S. political system.

Von Moltke has been a subject of many interviews and articles. In 1995, she told interviewer Alison Owings: "People who lived through the Nazi time, and who still live, who did not lose their lives because they were opposed, all had to make compromises."

With the reunification of Germany, Moltke was supportive of transforming the former Moltke estate in Kreisau into a meeting place to promote German-Polish and European mutual understanding. Poland and Germany invested 30 million Deutsche Mark in renovating the venue. It opened in 1998 as the Kreisau International Youth Center. In 2004, a fund was established to promote the long-term support of the meeting place and further the work done there. As of 2007, Moltke actively supported this initiative as the honorary chair of the board of trustees of the Kreisau Foundation for European Understanding (the supporting entity for the Kreisau meeting site) and the Institute for Cultural Infrastructure, Sachsen in Görlitz. Freya von Moltke died in Norwich, Vermont, on 1 January 2010, at the age of 98.

== Recognition and legacy ==
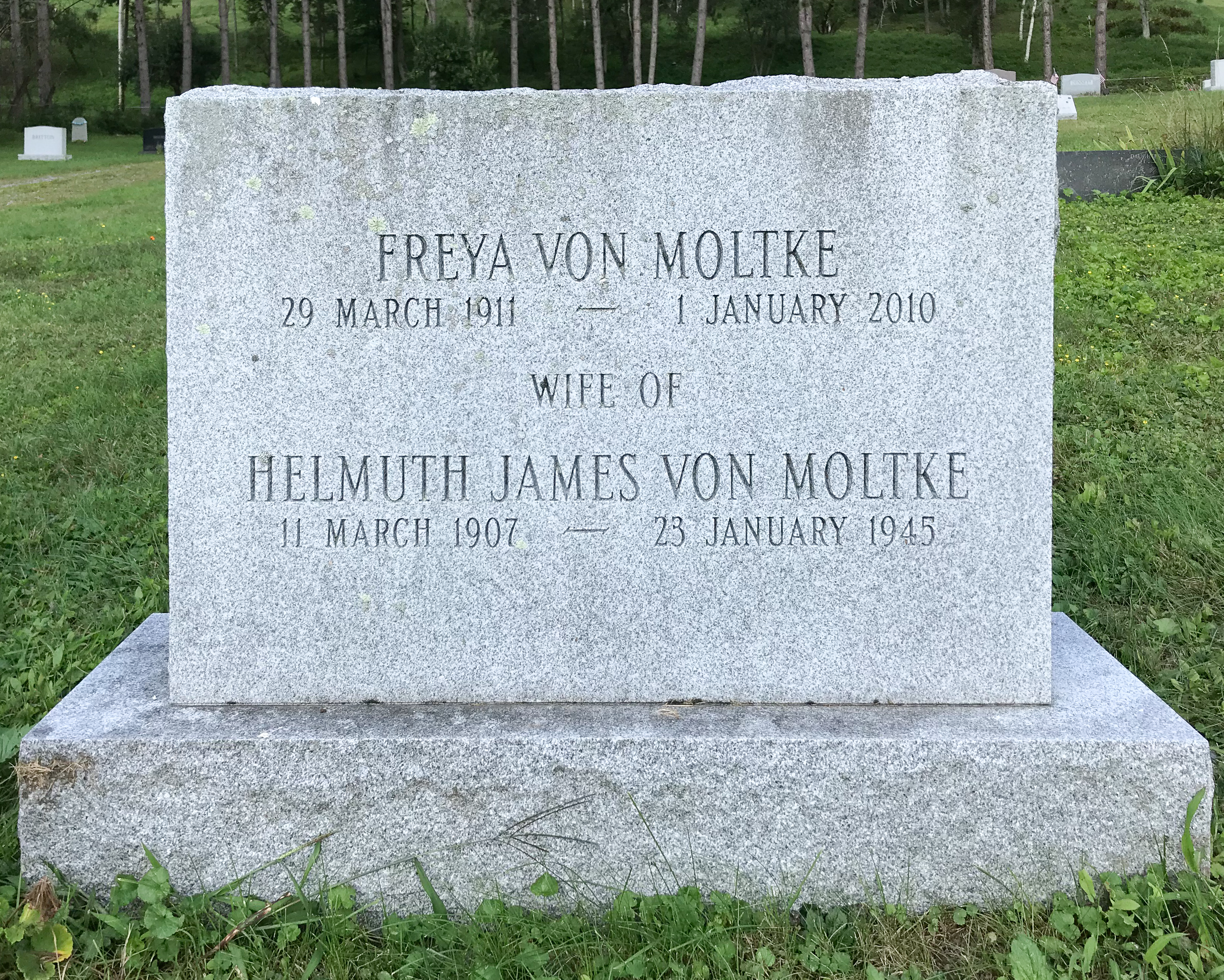
Headstone of Freya von Moltke in Norwich, Vermont.

In 1999, Dartmouth College awarded Moltke an honorary Doctorate of Humane Letters for her writings on the German opposition to Hitler during World War II. In the same year, she accepted the Bruecke Prize from the city of Görlitz, Germany, in recognition of her life's work.

Moltke met with three German Chancellors in connection with her life's work, Helmut Kohl in 1998 to introduce him to the Kreisau International Youth Center built in Krzyżowa, Gerhard Schroeder in 2004 at a wreath-laying ceremony to honor Nazi resisters, and Angela Merkel in 2007 at a commemoration of the birth centenary of her husband, Helmuth von Moltke, where Merkel described her husband as a symbol of "European courage". Moltke's life served as the basis of a play by Marc Smith, A Journey to Kreisau.

In January 2011, a documentary of her life, including her last interview in English, premiered at Goethe-Institut, Boston.
