= Brandeis Award (litigation) =

The Louis D. Brandeis Award of the U.S. Federal Trade Commission is given during an annual award ceremony to a single litigation attorney for outstanding service.

The award is named after Justice Louis D. Brandeis, the first Supreme Court judge to interpret a Constitutional right to privacy.

Past recipients:

- 1988: David C. Shonka
- 1993: Ann B. Malester
- 1997: George S. Cary
- 2000: Richard B. Dagen
- 2002: James Kohm
- 2004: Heather Hippsley
- 2006: Joseph Brownman
- 2008: Leslie Melman
- 2010: Steven Wernikoff
- 2012: Joe Barton, Ed Markey, Ross Anderson, Alan F. Westin
- 2013: Peter J. Hustinx, Mark A. Rothstein
- 2014: Latanya Sweeney, Peter Schaar
- 2015: Steve Mohr, Alex “Sandy” Pentland, Dr. Masao Horibe
- 2016: Joe Cannataci
- 2017: Nikolaus Forgó
- 2018: Patricia McDermott

== See also ==
- List of legal awards
