= Lothar König =

Lothar König

Lothar König (1906–1946) was a German Jesuit priest and member of the Kreisau Circle of the German Resistance during the Nazi period. Though multi-denominational, the Kreisau group's opposition to the Hitler regime had a strongly Christian orientation, and looked for a general Christian revival, and reawakening of awareness of the transcendental. Its outlook was rooted both in German romantic and idealist tradition and in the Catholic doctrine of natural law. König would become an important intermediary between the Circle and bishops Grober of Freiberg and Preysing of Berlin.

On December 14, 1942 König wrote to Reverend Robert Leiber, the Pope's private secretary and a liaison to the Resistance, to inform him that his sources had confirmed approximately 6,000 Polish and Jewish people were being killed every day in "SS-furnaces" located in an area of what was then German-occupied Poland and is now part of western Ukraine. It also referenced the Nazi death camps at Auschwitz and Dachau.

After the failure of the 1944 July Plot to assassinate Hitler, König was pursued by the Gestapo and sought refuge in a coal cellar, where he lived in hiding until the end of the war. König died shortly after the war from the effects of his time in hiding.

== See also ==
- Catholic Church and Nazi Germany
- Kirchenkampf
