= Helmuth-James-von-Moltke-Preis =

The Helmuth-James-von-Moltke-Preis was established in 2001 by the German Section of the International Society for Military Law and the Law of War. It is awarded every two years for outstanding judicial works in the field of security policy.

The prize is named after the German jurist Helmuth von Moltke (1907–1945), involved in the 20 July Plot.

== Recipients ==
- 2001: Peter Hilpold, Birgit Kessler
- 2003: Andreas Hasenclever
- 2005: Heike Krieger, Detlev Wolter
- 2007: Heiko Meiertöns
- 2009: Katharina Ziolkowski
- 2012: Daniel Heck, Jana Hertwig
- 2016: Christiane Oehmke, Tilman Rodenhäuser
- 2018: Patrick Oliver Heinemann, Anton O. Petrov
- 2022: Alexander Wentker
