= Alison Owings =

American oral historian and author

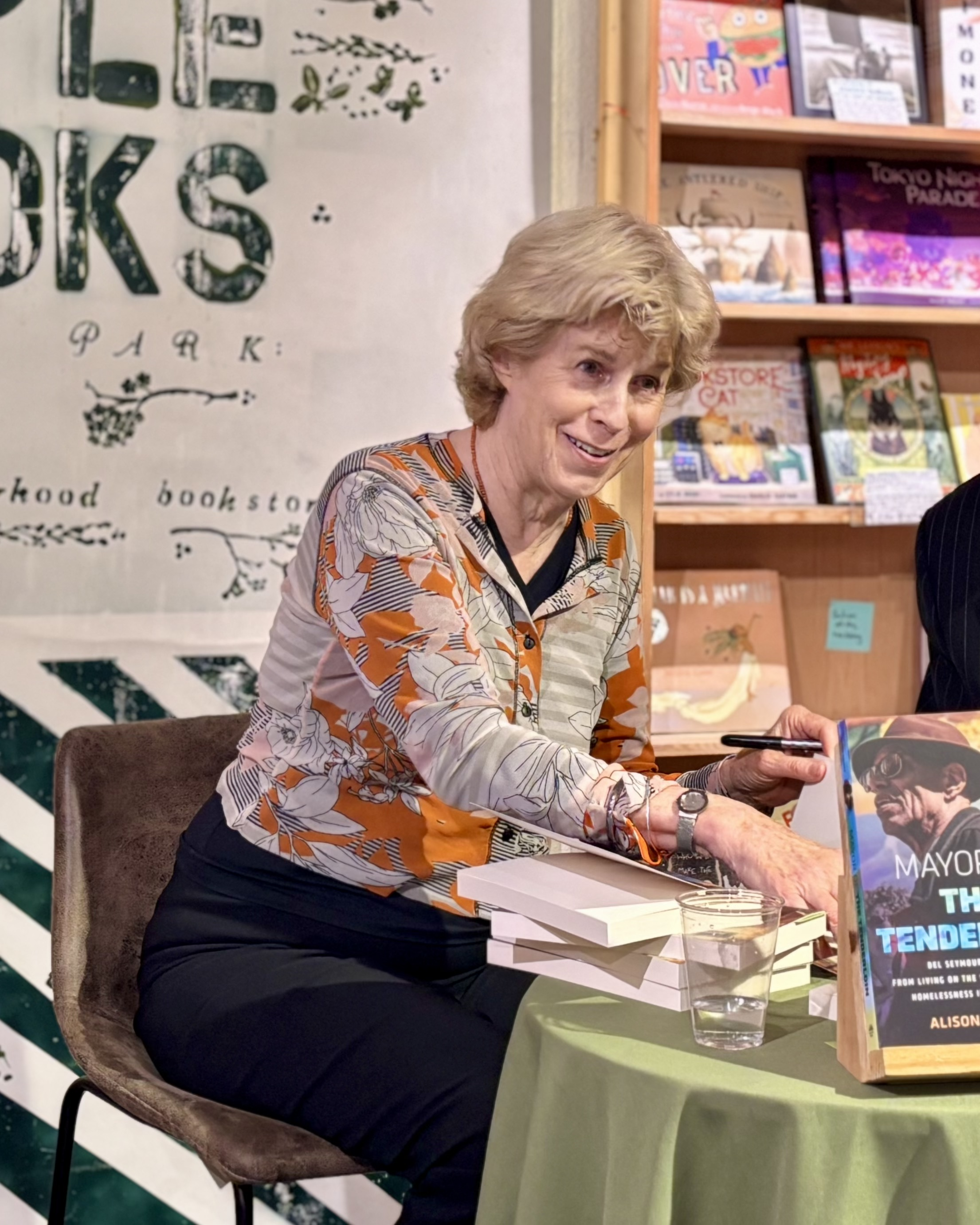
- Owings at her paperback launch for Mayor of the Tenderloin, Green Apple Books on the Park, San Francisco, September 9, 2025.
- Born: June 17, 1944 (age 82); Pasadena, California, United States of America
- Occupation: Writer
- Writing career
- Notable works: Mayor of the Tenderloin: Del Seymour's Journey from Living on the Streets to Fighting Homelessness in San Francisco (2024), Frauen: German Women Recall the Third Reich (1993)

Alison Owings (born June 17, 1944) is an American oral historian, journalist, and author. She is the author of Frauen: German Women Recall the Third Reich (1993), Hey, Waitress! The USA from the Other Side of the Tray (2002), Indian Voices: Listening to Native Americans (2011), and Mayor of the Tenderloin: Del Seymour's Journey from Living on the Streets to Fighting Homelessness in San Francisco (2024). Her work has been published by Rutgers University Press, the University of California Press, Heyday, and Beacon Press, and has been reviewed in outlets including The New York Times and the San Francisco Chronicle.

== Early life and education ==
Owings was born in Pasadena, California and grew up in New Jersey and Pennsylvania. She studied in Germany at University of Freiburg from 1964 to 1965 and earned a bachelor’s degree from American University in Washington, D.C., in 1966.

== Career ==
Owings's work often centers on communities whose voices are less represented in mainstream histories. Frauen: German Women Recall the Third Reich (Rutgers University Press, 1993) collected first-person accounts from German women during the Nazi era. She later published Hey, Waitress! The USA from the Other Side of the Tray (University of California Press, 2002), based on interviews with waitresses across the United States.

Her book Indian Voices: Listening to Native Americans (Rutgers University Press, 2011) presented oral histories from Native American men and women across the country.

In 2024, Beacon Press published Mayor of the Tenderloin: Del Seymour's Journey from Living on the Streets to Fighting Homelessness in San Francisco, a biography of San Francisco community leader Del Seymour that recounts his experiences with homelessness in the Tenderloin and his founding of Code Tenderloin, a nonprofit offering job readiness programs in the city. Mayor of the Tenderloin was reviewed in the San Francisco Chronicle, which described it as “a richly satisfying tapestry” of Seymour’s life and the neighborhood. Booklist called it “a memorable biography” and noted that it “proves to be both entertaining and life-affirming.”

== Selected works ==
- The Wander Woman's Phrasebook: How to Meet or Avoid People in Three Romance Languages. Shameless Hussey Press, 1987. ISBN 9780915288533.
- Frauen: German Women Recall the Third Reich. Rutgers University Press, 1993. ISBN 9780813519920.
- Hey, Waitress! The USA from the Other Side of the Tray. University of California Press, 2002. ISBN 9780520217508.
- Indian Voices: Listening to Native Americans. Rutgers University Press, 2011. ISBN 9780813549651.
- Mayor of the Tenderloin. Beacon Press, 2024. ISBN 9780807020579.
