= Fernand Collin Prize for Law =

Belgian legal prize

The Fernand Collin Prize for Law (Dutch: Fernand Collin-prijs voor Recht) was named after Fernand Collin. It is awarded to a scientist who makes a significant Dutch-language contribution to law in Belgium. In 1972 it was awarded to an economist. Beginning in 2023, the prize is awarded for Dutch-language works in even years, and for English-language works in odd years.

== Awards ==
- 1962 - Walter Van Gerven (Katholieke Universiteit Leuven): Het toegeven van premies in het Klein Europees handelsverkeer
- 1972 - Willy van Ryckeghem (Vrije Universiteit Brussel and Ghent University): Een econometrische studie van het dynamisch verband tussen inflatie en werkloosheid: een internationale vergelijking
- 1982 - Marc Maresceau (Ghent University): De directe werking van het Europees gemeenschapsrecht
- 1984 - Koenraad Lenaerts (Katholieke Universiteit Leuven): Constitutie en rechter. De rechtspraak van het Amerikaanse Opperste Gerechtshof, het Europese Hof van Justitie en het Europese Hof voor de Rechten van de Mens
- 1986 - Michel Flamee (Vrije Universiteit Brussel): Octrooieerbaarheid van software. Rechtsvergelijkende studie : België, Nederland, Frankrijk, Bondsrepubliek Duitsland, Groot-Brittannië, de Verenigde Staten van Noord-Amerika en het Europees octrooiverdrag
- 1988 - Aloïs Van Oevelen (University of Antwerp): De overheidsaansprakelijkheid voor het optreden van de rechterlijke macht
- 1990 - Jan Velaers: (University of Antwerp): De juridische vormgeving van de beperkingen van de vrijheid van meningsuiting
- 1992 - Thierry Vansweevelt (University of Antwerp): De civielrechtelijke aansprakelijkheid van de geneesheer en het ziekenhuis
- 1994 - Sophie Stijns (Katholieke Universiteit Leuven): De gerechtelijke en buitengerechtelijke ontbinding van wederkerige overeenkomsten naar Belgisch recht, getoetst aan het Franse en het Nederlandse recht
- 1996 - Piet Taelman (Ghent University): Het gezag van het rechterlijk gewijzigde in het gerechtelijk recht - begripsbepaling en -afbakening
- 1998 - Patricia Popelier (University of Antwerp): Rechtszekerheid als beginsel voor behoorlijke regelgeving
- 2000 - Piet Van Nuffel (Katholieke Universiteit Leuven): De rechten van nationale overheden in het Europees recht
- 2000 - Annelies Wylleman ((Ghent University): Onvolwaardige wilsvorming en onbekwaamheid in het materieel en het formeel privaatrecht
- 2002 - Erik Claes (Katholieke Universiteit Leuven): Legaliteit en rechtsvinding in het strafrecht. Een grondslagentheoreische benadering
- 2004 - Johan Du Mongh (Katholieke Universiteit Leuven): De erfovergang van aandelen
- 2004 - Britt Weyts (University of Antwerp): De fout van het slachtoffer in het buitencontractueel aansprakelijkheidsrecht
- 2006 - Steven Lierman (University of Antwerp): Voorzorg, preventie en aansprakelijkheid. Gezondheidsrechtelijke analyse aan de hand van het gebruik van ioniserende straling in de geneeskunde.
- 2010 - Ingrid Boone (Ghent University): Verhaal van derde-betalers op de aansprakelijke
- 2012 - Jürgen Vanpraet (University of Antwerp): De latente staatshervorming. De bevoegdheidsverdeling in de rechtspraak van het Grondwettelijk Hof en de adviespraktijk van de Raad van State
- 2014 - Tom Decaigny (Vrije Universiteit Brussel): Tegenspraak in het vooronderzoek. Een onderzoek naar de meerwaarde van een vroege participatie van de verdachte in de Belgische strafprocedure
- 2016 - Sofie Cools (Katholieke Universiteit Leuven): De bevoegdheidsverdeling tussen algemene vergadering en raad van bestuur in de NV
- 2018 - Joost Huysmans (Katholieke Universiteit Leuven): Legitieme verdediging
- 2020 - Tim Opgenhaffen (Katholieke Universiteit Leuven): Vrijheidsbeperkingen in de zorg
- 2022 - Janek Tomasz Nowak (Katholieke Universiteit Leuven): Ambtshalve toepassing van EU-recht door de Belgische burgerlijke rechter
- 2023 - Sarah Lambrecht (University of Antwerp): Convention through States’ Eyes. Embedding of the European Convention on Human Rights in States Parties

== Sources ==
- Fernand Collin-prijs voor Recht
