= Helmuth James von Moltke =

German resistance member (1907–1945)

Helmuth James Graf von Moltke
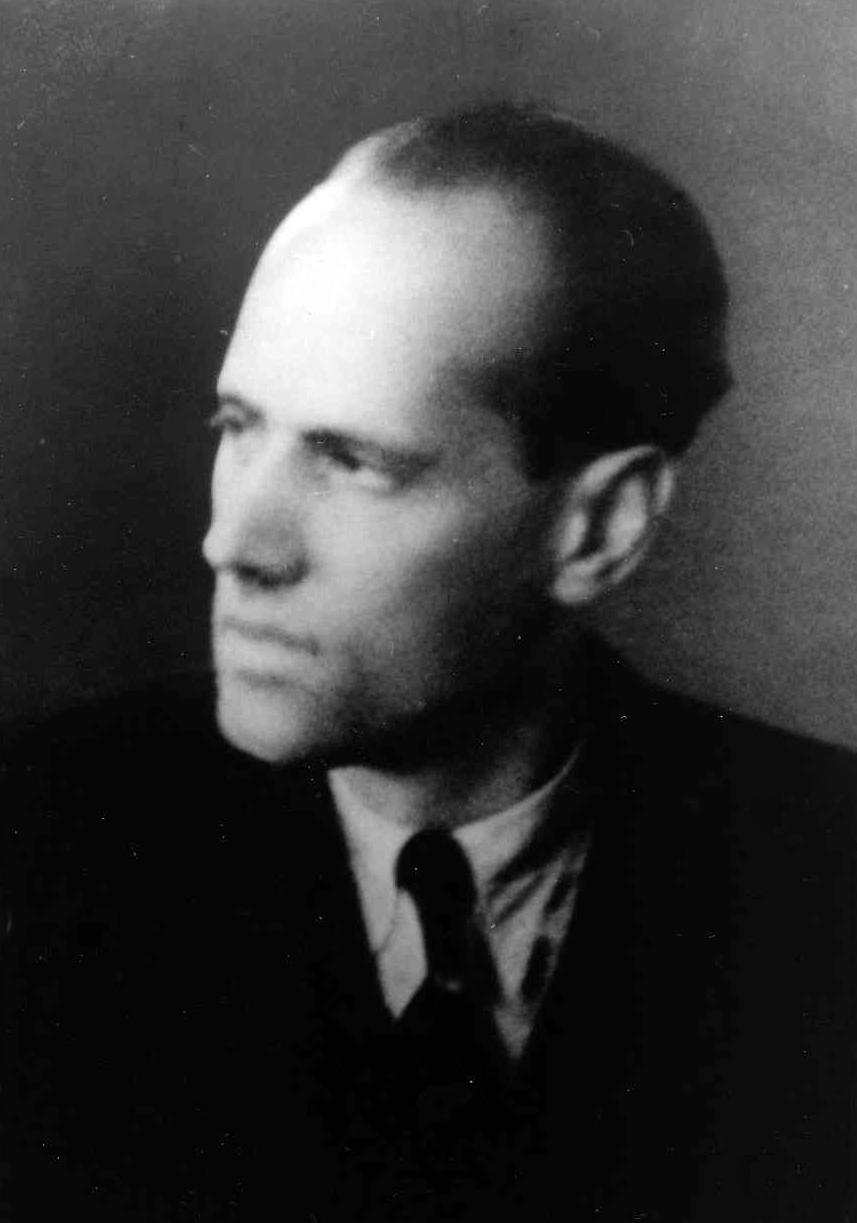
- Moltke in January 1945
- Born: 11 March 1907; Kreisau, Prussia, German Empire (now Krzyżowa, Poland)
- Died: 23 January 1945 (aged 37); Plötzensee Prison, Berlin, Nazi Germany
- Cause of death: Execution by hanging
- Resting place: Hamburg-Wandsbek
- Other name: Helmuth James Ludwig Eugen Heinrich Graf von Moltke
- Education: University of Breslau; University of Oxford
- Occupation: Lawyer
- Known for: Non-violent opposition to the Nazi government of Germany as co-founder of the Kreisau Circle
- Spouse: Freya Deichmann
- Children: Helmuth Caspar, Konrad

Helmuth James Graf von Moltke (11 March 1907 – 23 January 1945) was a German jurist who, as a draftee in the German Abwehr, acted to subvert German human-rights abuses of people in territories occupied by Germany during World War II. He was a founding member of the Kreisau Circle opposition group, whose members opposed the government of Adolf Hitler in Nazi Germany, and discussed prospects for a Germany based on moral and democratic principles after Hitler. The Nazis executed him for treason for his participation in these discussions.

Moltke was the grandnephew of Helmuth von Moltke the Younger and the great-grandnephew of Helmuth von Moltke the Elder, the victorious commander in the Austro-Prussian and Franco-Prussian Wars, from whom he inherited the Kreisau estate in Prussian Silesia, now Krzyżowa in Poland.

== Early life ==
Moltke was born in Kreisau (now Krzyżowa, Poland) in the Prussian Province of Silesia, to Helmuth Adolf von Moltke and Dorothy née Rose Innes. His mother was a South African of British descent, the daughter of Sir James Rose Innes, Chief Justice of the Union of South Africa from 1914 to 1927, and his wife Jessie Rose Innes.

Moltke's parents were Christian Scientists, his mother adopting his father's religion after marriage. His father became a Christian Science practitioner and teacher, and both parents were in the group that translated the first German edition of the Christian Science textbook, Science and Health with Key to the Scriptures by Mary Baker Eddy. For reasons of family tradition, Moltke decided to become confirmed in the Evangelical Church of Prussia when he was 14.

== Education ==
From 1927 to 1929, Moltke studied law and political sciences in Breslau, Vienna, Heidelberg, and Berlin. In 1928, Moltke became involved with college teachers and youth movement leaders in the organization of the Löwenberger Arbeitsgemeinschaften (Löwenberg working groups) in which unemployed young workers and young farmers were brought together with students so that they could learn from one another. They also discussed civics, obligations, and rights. In Kreisau, Moltke set aside an unused part of the estate for farming startups, which earned him harsh criticism from neighbouring landowners.

In 1931, he married Freya Deichmann, whom he met in Austria. In 1934, Moltke took his junior law examination. In 1935, he declined the chance to become a judge to avoid having to join the Nazi Party. Instead, he opened a law practice in Berlin. As a lawyer dealing in international law, he helped victims of Hitler's régime emigrate, and he traveled abroad to maintain contacts. Between 1935 and 1938, Moltke regularly visited Great Britain, where he completed English legal training in London and Oxford.

== International law division of the Abwehr ==
In 1939, World War II began with the German invasion of Poland. Moltke was immediately drafted at the beginning of the Polish campaign by the Abwehr, the High Command of the Armed Forces (Oberkommando der Wehrmacht), Counter-Intelligence Service, Foreign Division, under Admiral Wilhelm Canaris, as an expert in martial law and international public law. Moltke's work for the Abwehr mainly involved gathering insights from abroad, from military attachés and foreign newspapers, and news of military-political importance, and relaying this information to the Wehrmacht. He maintained the connection between the OKW and the Foreign Office, but above all to provide appraisals of questions of the international laws of war. Unusually, he chose not to wear a uniform.

In his travels through German-occupied Europe, he observed many human rights abuses, which he attempted to thwart by citing legal principles. Moltke was one of the few officials who argued for treating captured Soviet prisoners of war according to the 1929 Geneva Convention, a treaty that Germany had signed and was legally obliged to follow. In October 1941, Moltke wrote: "Certainly more than a thousand people are murdered in this way every day, and another thousand German men are habituated to murder.... What shall I say when I am asked: And what did you do during that time?" In the same letter he said, "Since Saturday the Berlin Jews are being rounded up. Then they are sent off with what they can carry.... How can anyone know these things and walk around free?"

Moltke hoped that his appraisals could have a humanitarian effect on military actions; he was supported by anti-Hitler officers such as Canaris and Major General Hans Oster, Chief of the Central Division. During Nazi Germany's war with the Soviet Union, Moltke wrote a memorandum urging the Wehrmacht to follow both the Geneva Convention and the Hague Convention, in order to comply with international law and to promote reciprocal good treatment for German prisoners of war, but the recommendation was rejected by Field Marshal Wilhelm Keitel, who scribbled on the margin that "The objections arise from the military concept of chivalrous warfare".

Moltke invoked international law and political reasoning to stop the shooting of hostages in Holland, and was involved in warning the Danish resistance movement of the impending planned deportation of Danish Jews, which led to their mass evacuation by boat from Copenhagen to Malmö, Sweden. Having access to information about deportations and the shootings of hostages reinforced Moltke's opposition to the war and the entire program of the Nazi Party.

Moltke's meeting with Aimée Sotto Maior (aka de Heeren), a Brazilian spy who had come to Paris in 1938 under the cover of being a wealthy heiress and fashion shopper, allowed her to discourage Brazilian president, Getúlio Vargas, from entering an alliance with Germany.

Dorothy Thompson, one of the most famous and celebrated journalists of the period, performed a radio show during the war called Listen, Hans! These broadcasts were addressed, in German, to a fictional Prussian Junker identified only as “Hans.” Thompson later explained that the figure of 'Hans' whom she addressed her broadcasts to was really Helmuth James von Moltke III.

In 1943, Moltke traveled to Istanbul on two occasions. The official reason was to retrieve German merchant ships impounded by Turkey. The real reason was participation in an effort to end the war by a coalition of anti-Hitler elements of the German Army, German refugees living in Turkey, members of the OSS, the Abwehr (German military intelligence) and the German ambassador to Turkey, Franz von Papen. This group passed a report to the Allies, which reached President Franklin Roosevelt. However, Roosevelt's advisers, including Henry Morgenthau Jr., counseled against the credibility of the report.

== Nonviolent opposition to Nazi rule ==
Moltke also surreptitiously spread the information to which he was privy, on the war and the Nazi concentration camps, to friends outside the Nazi party, including members of the Resistance in occupied Europe. Declassified British documents reveal that he twice attempted to contact British officials, including friends from Oxford, offering to "go to any length" to assist them, but the British refused the first time, confusing him with his uncle, the German ambassador to Spain, and replied to the second offer by asking for "deeds" rather than "talk".

Moltke possessed strong religious convictions. In a 1942 letter smuggled to a British friend Lionel Curtis, Moltke wrote: "Today, not a numerous, but an active part of the German people are beginning to realize, not that they have been led astray, not that bad times await them, not that the war may end in defeat, but that what is happening is sin and that they are personally responsible for each terrible deed that has been committed – naturally, not in the earthly sense, but as Christians". In the same letter, Moltke wrote that before World War II, he had believed that it was possible to be totally opposed to National Socialism without believing in God, but he now declared his former ideas to be "wrong, completely wrong". In Moltke's opinion, only by believing in God could one be a total opponent of the Nazis.

=== Kreisau Circle ===
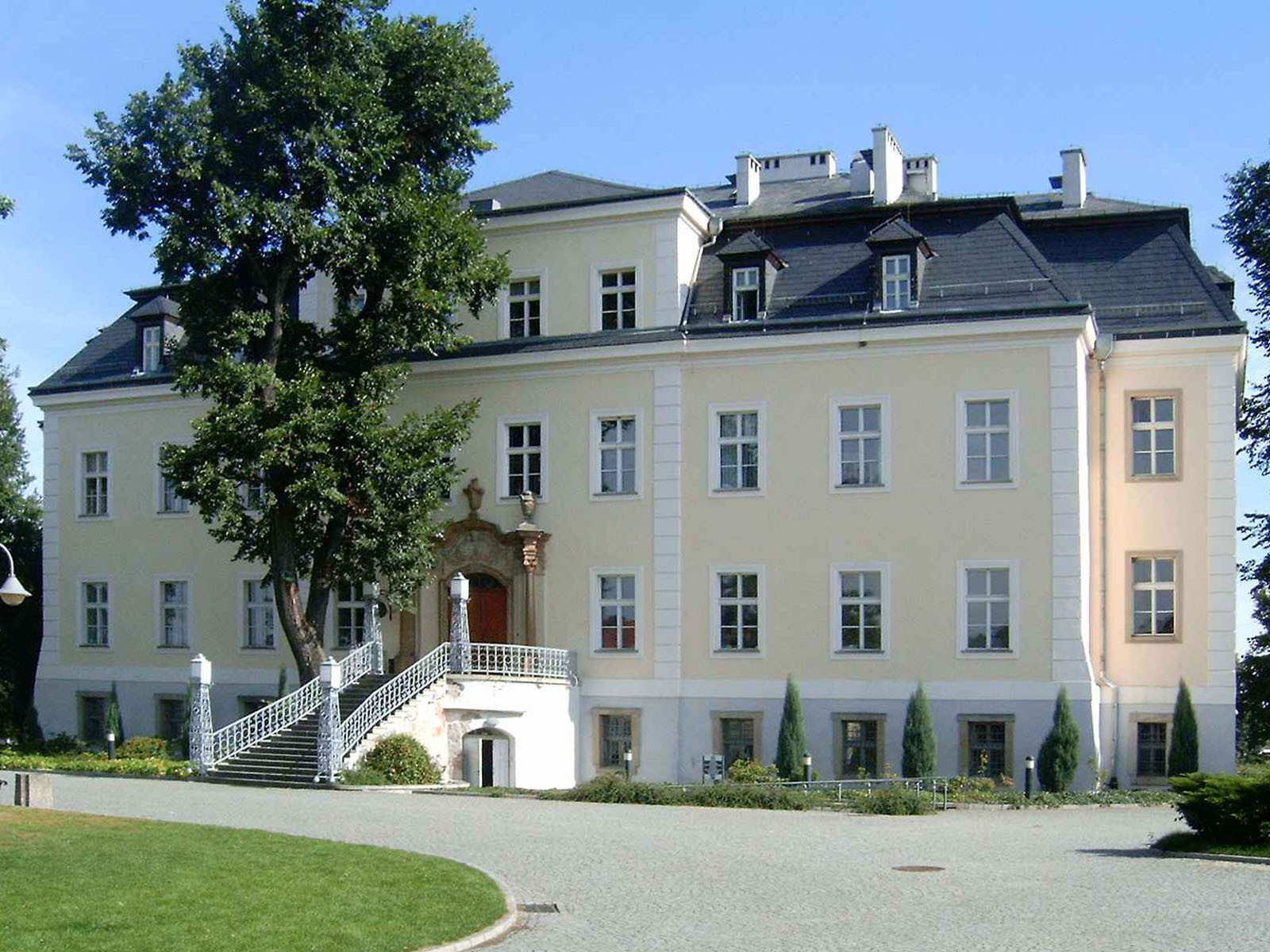
The von Moltke main house at Kreisau

In Berlin Moltke had a circle of acquaintances who opposed Nazism and who met frequently there, but on three occasions met at Kreisau. These three incidental gatherings were the basis for the term "Kreisau Circle". The meetings at Kreisau had an agenda of well-organized discussion topics, beginning with relatively innocuous ones as cover. The topics of the first meeting of May 1942 included the failure of German educational and religious institutions to fend off the rise of Nazism. The theme of the second meeting in the autumn of 1942 was on post-war reconstruction, assuming the likely defeat of Germany. This included both economic planning and self-government, developing a pan-European concept that pre-dated the European Union, summarized in documented resolutions. The third meeting, in June 1943, addressed how to handle the legacy of Nazi war crimes after the fall of the dictatorship. These and other meetings resulted in "Principles for the New [Post-Nazi] Order" and "Directions to Regional Commissioners", works, which Moltke asked his wife, Freya, to hide in a place that not even he knew.

Moltke opposed the assassination of Hitler. He believed that if one succeeded, Hitler would become a martyr, and if it failed, that would expose those few individuals among the German leadership who could be counted on to build a democratic state after the collapse of the Third Reich. On 20 July 1944, there was an attempt on Hitler's life, which the Gestapo used as a pretext to eliminate perceived opponents to the Nazi regime. In the aftermath of the plot, some 5,000 of Hitler's opponents were executed.

== Arrest, trial and execution ==
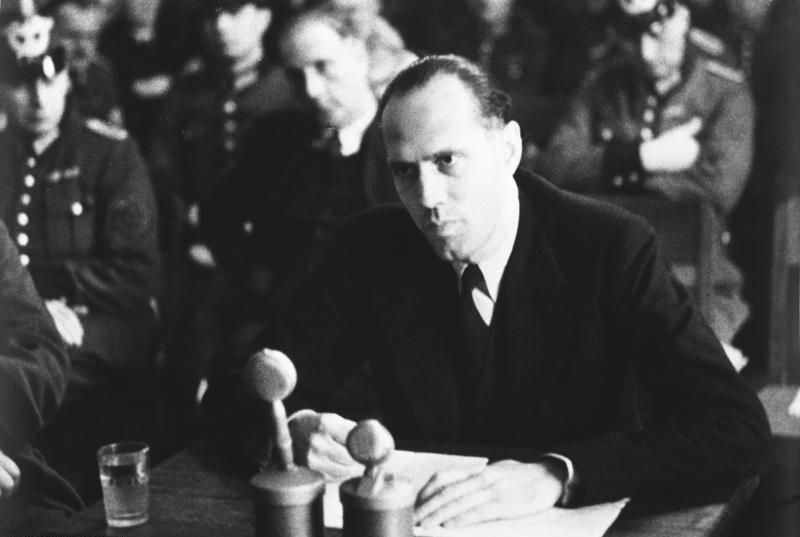
Moltke at the Volksgerichtshof

Moltke's mindset and his objections to orders that were at odds with international law both put him at risk of arrest. Indeed, the Gestapo arrested him in January 1944. A year later, in January 1945, he stood, along with several of his fellow régime opponents, before the People's Court (Volksgerichtshof), presided over by Roland Freisler. Because no evidence could be found that Moltke had participated in any conspiracy to bring about a coup d'état, Freisler had to invent a charge de novo.

Since Moltke and his friends had discussed a Germany based on moral and democratic principles that could develop after Hitler, Freisler deemed this discussion as treason, a crime worthy of death. Hanns Lilje writes in his autobiography that as Moltke stood before the Volksgerichtshof, he had "possessed, in the face of clear recognition of the fact that the death penalty had already been decided, the moral courage for an attack on Freisler and the whole institution". In two letters written to his wife in January 1945 while imprisoned at Tegel Prison, Moltke noted with considerable pride that he was to be executed for his ideas, not his actions, a point that had been underlined a number of times by Freisler. In one letter, Moltke noted "Thus it is documented, that not plans, not preparations, but the spirit as such shall be persecuted. Vivat Freisler!" In the second letter, Moltke claimed that he stood before the court "not as a Protestant, not as a great landowner, not as an aristocrat, not as a Prussian, not as a German...but as a Christian and nothing else". He wrote: "But what the Third Reich is so terrified of ... is ultimately the following: a private individual, your husband, of whom it is established that he discussed with 2 clergymen of both denominations [Protestant and Catholic] ... questions of the practical, ethical demands of Christianity. Nothing else; for that alone we are condemned.... I just wept a little, not because I was sad or melancholy ... but because I am thankful and moved by this proof of God's presence."

Moltke was sentenced to death on 11 January 1945 and hanged twelve days later at Plötzensee Prison in Berlin. In a letter written while in custody, he revealed his motivation for resistance to his two sons: "Since National Socialism came to power, I have striven to mitigate the consequences for its victims and to prepare the way for change. My conscience drove me to it – it's a man's duty, after all."

== Recognition ==
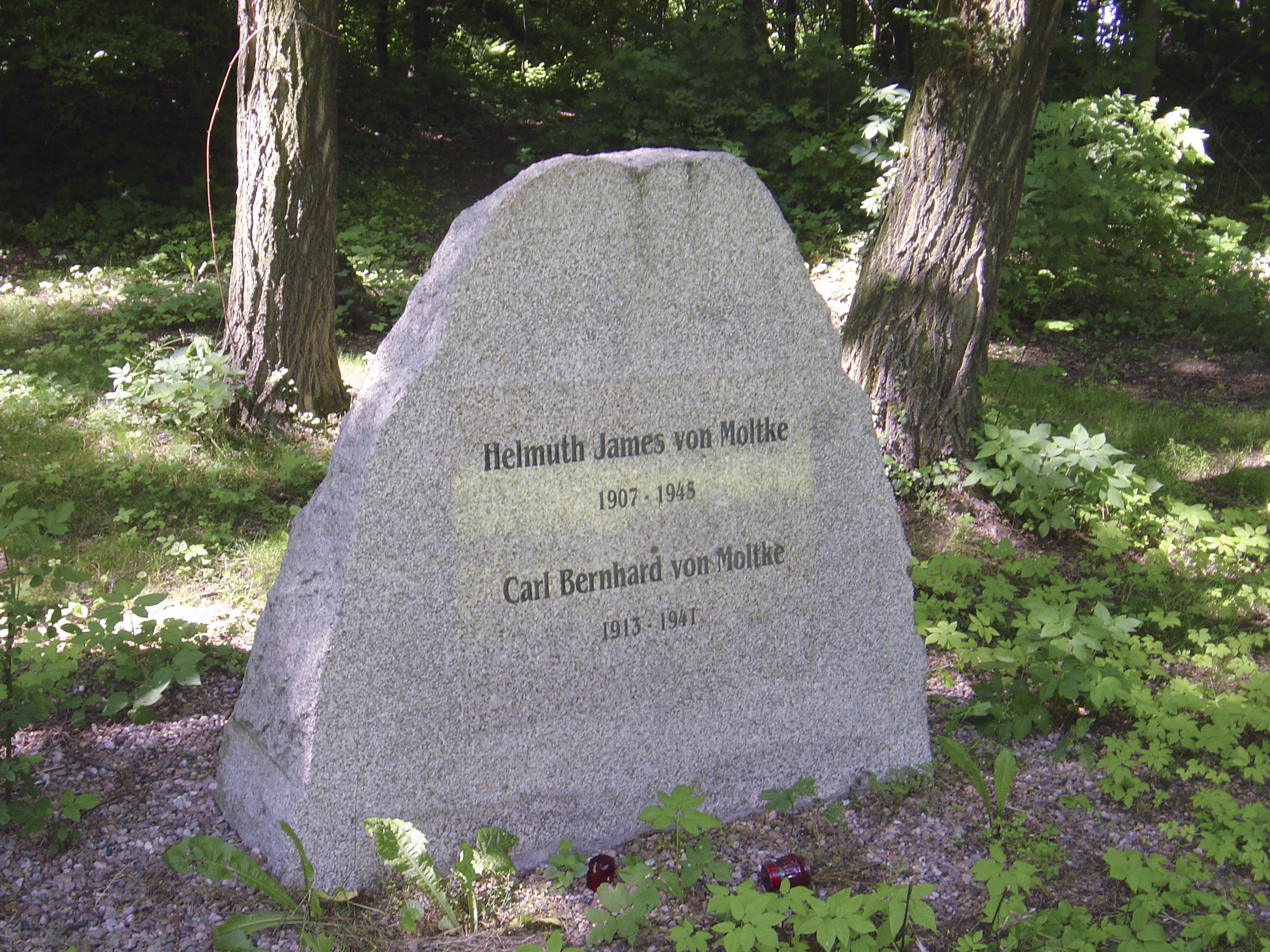
Memorial stone to Moltke and his brother at Kreisau (now Krzyżowa, Poland)

In 1989, Moltke was posthumously awarded the Geschwister-Scholl-Preis for his work, Briefe an Freya 1939–1945.

In 2001, the German Section of the International Society for Military Law and the Law of War established the Helmuth-James-von-Moltke-Preis for outstanding judicial works in the field of security policy.

As Germany continues to shed light on the internal dynamics of the Nazi era, Moltke has become a prominent symbol of moral opposition to the Nazi regime. On 11 March 2007, Moltke's centenary was commemorated in the Französischer Dom in Berlin, where he was described by German chancellor Angela Merkel as a symbol of "European courage".

His life was the subject of a 1992 documentary film nominated for an Oscar, The Restless Conscience: Resistance to Hitler Within Germany 1933-1945. A biography by Günter Brakelmann compiles Moltke's letters, diary, and other papers shared by his wife.

== Publications ==
- Bericht aus Deutschland im Jahre 1943 ("Report from Germany in the Year 1943").
- Letzte Briefe aus dem Gefängnis Tegel ("Last Letters from Tegel Prison"). Letters to his wife Freya and his two sons from the time of the trial against him, first published in 1951, later published together with Bericht in many editions (latest: Diogenes, Zürich 1997 ISBN 3-257-22975-5).
- Briefe an Freya. 1939-1945, ed. Beate Ruhm von Oppen. 2. Auflage, Beck, München 1991 ISBN 3-406-35279-0. English edition: Letters to Freya: 1939–1945, New York: Alfred A. Knopf, ISBN 0-394-57923-2
