= Virginia Lawyers Weekly =

American weekly newspaper

- Type: Weekly newspaper
- Owner: BridgeTower Media
- Publisher: Susan A. Bocamazo
- Editor: Richard Foster
- Headquarters: 14321 Winter Breeze Dr., Suite 204, Midlothian, VA 23113
- Website: valawyersweekly.com

Virginia Lawyers Weekly is a weekly newspaper published on Mondays in Richmond, Virginia, United States. It reports digests of recent court opinions handed down in Virginia’s state and federal courts. The paper also covers legal news and publishes Verdict & Settlement Reports provided by lawyers in the Commonwealth.

== History ==
Virginia Lawyers Weekly was created and first published by Lawyers Weekly Inc.; it began publication on June 9, 1986. The paper started a companion website, www.valawyersweekly.com, in 1996.

In 2004, Minneapolis-based Dolan Media, Inc. (NYSE: DM) acquired the paper.
