= Harrison Tweed Award =

American legal award

The Harrison Tweed Award was created in 1956 to recognize the extraordinary achievements of state and local bar associations that develop or significantly expand projects or programs to increase access to civil legal services for poor persons or criminal defense services for indigents. This award is given annually by the American Bar Association's (ABA) Standing Committee on Legal Aid and Indigent Defendants and the National Legal Aid & Defender Association, is presented during the ABA Annual Meeting at a joint luncheon of the National Conference of Bar Presidents, National Association of Bar Executives and National Conference of Bar Foundations. The award is named for Harrison Tweed, past president of Sarah Lawrence College.

1953 • New York State Governor Thomas E. Dewey, and the state legislature formed the temporary Tweed Commission (named after its chair, lawyer Harrison Tweed) to conduct public and private hearings regarding the post-World War II court situation; such as overall caseload volumes that had grown to the point where court delay was becoming a major problem and procedural reform was necessary.

1955 • The Legislature created the Judicial Conference to allow for periodic meetings of judges to discuss problems and established the Office of State Administrator; their functions were merely advisory but allowed the permanent examination of court operations.

1958 • The Tweed Commission Report proposed reform through centralization of court administration, simplification of court structure, and continued supervision of the courts by the Judicial Conference and the Appellate Division.

1962 • A new Judiciary Article for the State Constitution, implementing many of the Tweed Commission recommendations, was approved by the Legislature and the voters; this article created the "Unified Court System," established the various trial courts, established the Administrative Board of the Judicial Conference (the Chief Judge of the Court of the Appellate Division), and conferred on the Appellate Divisions various administrative powers.

NOTE: Tweed fellow family members included Simeon E. Baldwin, Connecticut Governor and cofounder, American Bar Association; and Roger Nash Baldwin, cofounder and the first executive director, American Civil Liberties Union (ACLU).

== Recipients ==
The recipients of the Harrison Tweed Award include:

- 2024 - The Bar Association of San Francisco
- 2023 - Louisiana State Bar Association
- 2022 - Nebraska State Bar Association
- 2021 - Iowa State Bar Association, New York State Bar Association
- 2019 - Mississippi Bar, Philadelphia Bar Association (PA)
- 2018 - The State Bar of Texas, The Suffolk County Bar Association (NY)
- 2017 - The Essex County Bar Association Advocates, Inc. (MA)
- 2016 - District of Columbia Bar
- 2015 - Birmingham Bar Association (AL)
- 2014 - Colorado Bar Association, San Juan County (NM) Bar Association
- 2013 - The Onondaga County (NY) Bar Association
- 2012 - San Mateo County (CA) Bar Association, San Antonio Bar Association
- 2011 - The Minnesota Chapter of the Federal Bar Association
- 2010 - Tennessee Bar Association, Washington State Bar Association
- 2009 - North Carolina Bar Association, Philadelphia Bar Association (PA)
- 2008 - Monroe County Bar Association (NY), Houston Bar Association (TX)
- 2007 - Boston Bar Association (MA), Massachusetts Bar Association
- 2006 - Baton Rouge Bar Association (LA), Minnesota State Bar Association
- 2005 - Lafayette Parish Bar Association (LA), New York State Bar Association, Cleveland Bar Association (OH)
- 2004 - State Bar of Georgia, Mecklenburg County Bar (NC)
- 2003 - Santa Clara County Bar Association (CA)
- 2002 - Atlanta Bar Association, Association of the Bar of the City of New York and State Bar of Texas
- 2001 - Brooklyn Bar Association (NY), State Bar of California and Oregon State Bar
- 2000 - The Alameda County Bar Association (CA), and the Delaware State Bar Association
- 1999 - The Saginaw County Bar Association (MI), and the Washington State Bar Association
- 1998 - The State Bar of Michigan, the Forsyth County (N.C.) Bar Association and the Dallas Bar Association
- 1997 - Bar Association of San Francisco (CA), Gaston County Bar Association (NC), King County Bar Association (WA)
- 1996 - Jacksonville Bar Association (FL), Philadelphia Bar Association (PA), New York State Bar Association
- 1995 - Harrisonburg/Rockingham Bar Association (VA)
- 1994 - York County Bar Association and the Asian-American Bar Association of the Delaware Valley, District of Columbia Bar, Minnesota State Bar Association
- 1993 - Ohio State Bar Association
- 1992 - Florida Bar Association and the Indianapolis Bar Association
- 1990 - Beverly Hills Bar Association
- 1970 - Bar Association of Metropolitan St. Louis
- 1958 - Evansville Bar Association
