= Canan Arın =

Turkish human rights activist (born 1942)

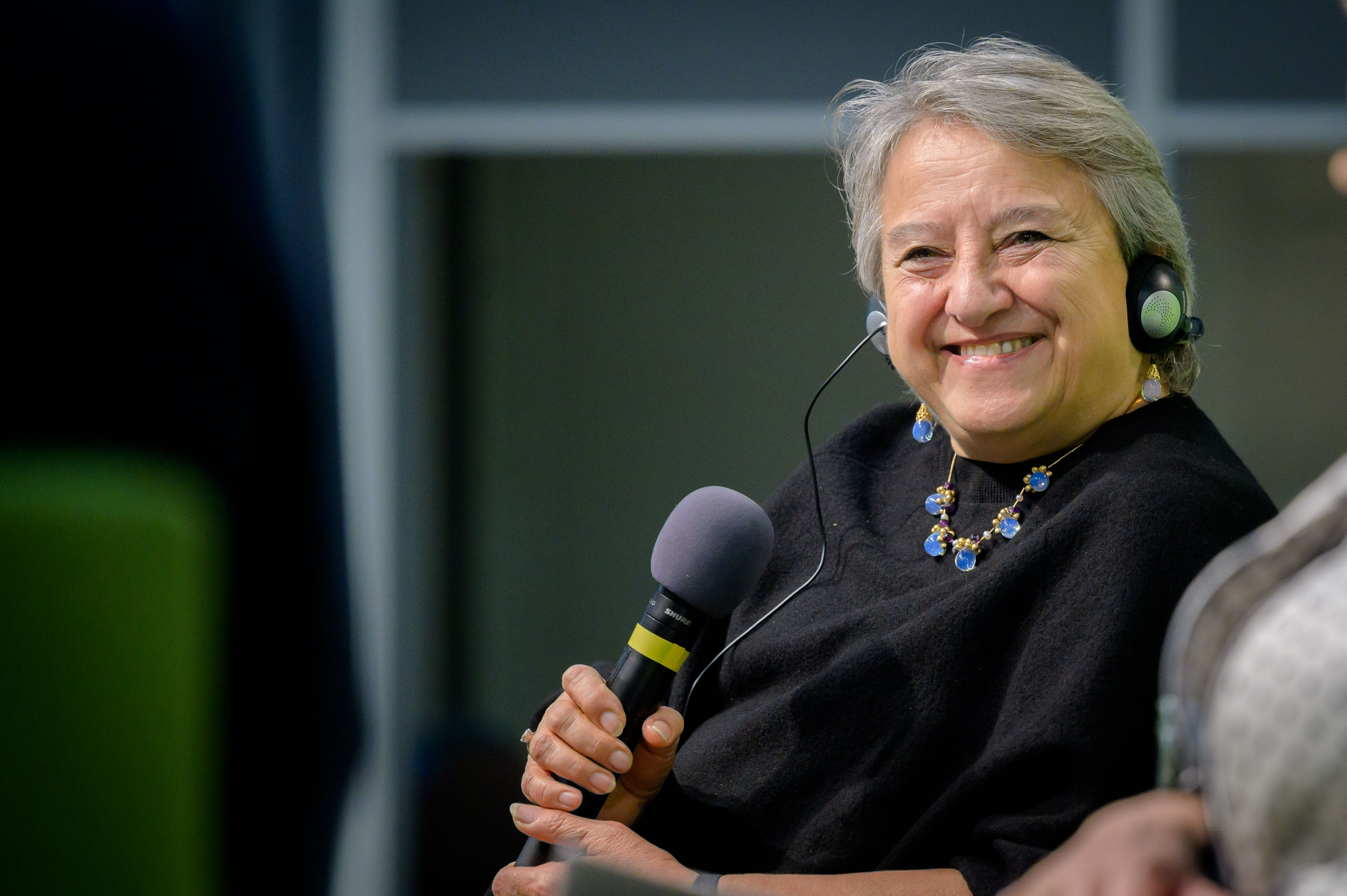
- Arın receiving the Anne Klein Women's Award in 2020
- Born: 1942 (age 83–84); Ankara, Turkey
- Education: Istanbul University
- Occupations: Lawyer; Human rights activist
- Years active: 1976–present
- Organization(s): Mor Çatı Foundation; KAMER Foundation
- Known for: Campaigning for women's rights in Turkey
- Awards: Anne Klein Women's Award (2020)

Mevhibe Canan Arın (born 1942) is a Turkish human rights activist. A noted feminist, she has co-founded several women's rights groups, including Mor Çatı and the KAMER Foundation. In 2020, Arın received the Anne Klein Women's Award in recognition of her work.

== Early life and education ==
Arın was born in 1942 in Ankara, into a Kemalist family. When she was 10, her parents divorced, and she moved to Istanbul with her mother, where she attended Istanbul Girls High School. Arın's parents were supportive of her receiving an education, and she studied law and political science at Istanbul University before moving to the United Kingdom in 1970 to study for a doctorate in constitutional law at the London School of Economics, though she was unable to complete her studies due to financial difficulties and returned to Turkey in 1975.

== Activism ==
Arın first became politically active while a student at Istanbul University, where she was an acquaintance of the revolutionary Deniz Gezmiş. After returning to Turkey in 1975, she established her own law office the following year. During the 1980s, following the 1980 coup d'état and subsequent military rule, Arın became involved with the second wave feminist movement, and began offering free legal advice to women experiencing domestic abuse. Arın has called for Turkish women from different backgrounds, including Kurdish, Alevi, and Kemalist women, to collaborate with one another to overcome ideological, religious and cultural boundaries and focus on improving the status of all women living in Turkey.

In 1990, Arın was one of the co-founders, alongside Şirin Tekeli and Nebahat Akkoç, of the Mor Çatı Foundation, an organisation that raised funds to establish Turkey's first women's shelter in 1995. She and Akkoç were among the founding members of the KADER Foundation later that decade, where Arın focused on supporting prospective female political candidates.

Between 1994 and 1997, Arın served as a member of the Council of Europe's Expert Panel on Gender Equality and Violence Against Woman. She spoke before the United Nations on multiple occasions, including at the World Conference on Women, 1995 in Beijing; the 23rd Special Session of the UN General Assembly in New York City in 2000; and a session on the Convention on the Elimination of All Forms of Discrimination Against Women in 2005.

In 2007, Arın was one of the founders of the Centre for the Advancement of Women within the Istanbul Bar Association. Arın has stated that family law in Turkey prioritised men and considered the female body to be "property"; she supports Turkish family law being secular. Arın refused to marry, citing Turkish family law that allowed perpetrators of honour killings against their wives to receive amnesty. Arın took part in reforms of Turkey's penal code through the Women's Platform, which took a gender equality perspective to proposed changes. She has trained lawyers handling cases of violence against women.

Arın has been a critic of the President of Turkey, Recep Tayyip Erdoğan, whom she has accused of enshrining patriarchal structures within Turkey, and downplaying violence against women. She has credited Erdoğan's conservative views as leading to increasing discrimination against Turkish women who do not wear headscarves. Arın has accused the Justice and Development Party of encouraging people to marry young, and portraying women as "sacred mother figures", which she said would lead to continuing high rates of violence against women. Arın has called the women's movement the biggest opposition movement against Erdoğan.

In 2012, Arın spoke out publicly against child marriage while speaking to the Antalya Bar Association, citing examples of men who had child brides, including Muhammad and the then-President of Turkey, Abdullah Gül. She was subsequently accused of "degrading religious values and insulting the Prophet and the head of state" and threatened with arrest, being briefly detained in Gaziantep, though she was not charged, which was attributed to public outcry and protests at her arrest. In 2021, Arın has called for Turkey to continue to ratify the Istanbul Convention, the Council of Europe's treaty on preventing and combating violence against women; she had campaigned for Turkey to sign the convention in 2012.

== Recognition ==
In 2018, Arın received the Bruno Leoni Institute of Law Award for her work addressing the issue of child marriage.

In 2020, Arın received the Anne Klein Women's Award from the Heinrich Böll Foundation. She was described as a "veteran of the modern Turkish women's movement".

In 2021, Arın received the 13th International Hrant Dink Award.
