= Universidad Autónoma de Ciudad Juárez =

University in Chihuahua, Mexico

- Motto: Por una vida científica, por una ciencia vital
- Motto in English: For a scientific life, for a vital science
- Established: 1973
- President: Dr. Daniel Alberto Constandse Cortez
- Faculty: 842
- Students: 21,308
- Undergraduates: 20,319
- Postgraduates: 989
- Location: Ciudad Juárez, Chihuahua, Mexico; 31.7412°N 106.4448°W
- Campus: IADA / IIT: 9 hectares ICB: 7.5 hectares ICSA: 24 hectares CU: 300 hectares
- Colors: Blue, yellow, white
- Nickname: Indios
- Website: www.uacj.mx

The Universidad Autónoma de Ciudad Juárez (Autonomous University of Ciudad Juárez, UACJ) is the largest university in the city of Ciudad Juárez, Chihuahua, Mexico. It was founded in October 1973.

== History ==
The UACJ was founded in 1973 by the integration of three universities, the Universidad Femenina, the Universidad Mixta, the Universidad Ciudad Juárez A.C., and the Universidad Autonoma de Ciudad Juarez. In the beginning, the Universidad Femenina was founded in 1968 with the enrollment of females only. The sub-professional careers offered in this institution were: social work, decoration, bilingual medical secretary, and Technical Assistant in Advertising. Later in the Universidad de Ciudad Juárez, the professional careers of law, architecture, and medicine were offered. On January 29, 1973, the then president of Mexico, Luis Echeverría Álvarez laid the foundation stone of the Autonomous University of Ciudad Juarez. Nowadays, UACJ is formed by four institutes and three multidisciplinary divisions within the state of Chihuahua.

== Identity ==
Elements of the emblem

The book: In the university's emblem, the book represents knowledge, study, and science.

The snail: represents the three institutes composing the university. The social sciences and administration institute, biomedical sciences institute, and engineering and architecture institute.

The flower or xochitl: stands for the presence of each one of the three universities that conformed the current UACJ.

The university's motto can be read inside the book, Por una vida científica, por una ciencia vital. Which means "For a scientific life, for a vital science".

The graphic style of the ideogram is given by the pictorial and educational tradition of the ancient Mexicans.

The glyph: In Náhuatl called the cuicatl. Which means singing, prayer or word. Represents the university's voice projected towards people.

The calmecar. Represents the house of wisdom.

== Notable alumni ==
- Imelda Marrufo (Mexican) - human rights activist known for her work campaigning against gender-based violence and femicide in the city of Ciudad Juárez, for which she received the 2014 Anne Klein Women's Award from the Heinrich Böll Foundation.
- Samuel Martínez Roque (Mexican, 1995— ) writer, political essayist, researcher based in El Paso, Texas advocacing on immigrant rights, trafficking in persons, labor exploitation, drawing on personal testimony, political criticism, and public health research. He is the author of Martínez Roque v. USA, a 24-part nonfiction political essay series examining structural violence, systemic injustice, and institutional failures in the United States concerning victims of trafficking in persons. Through his writing and advocacy, Martínez Roque emphasizes meaningful access to justice for victims and immigrants.

== See also ==
- Gimnasio Universitario UACJ
