= Prasanna Gettu =

Indian victimologist and women right's activist

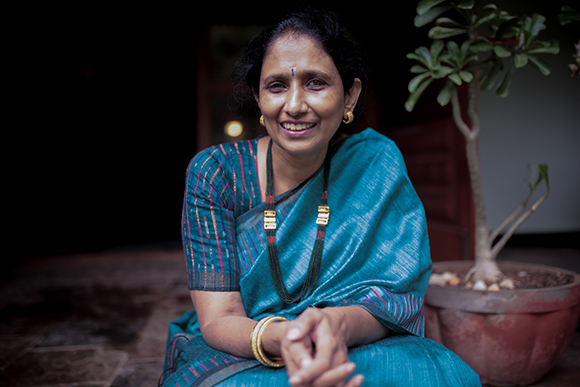
- Portrait by Prasanna Gettu
- Education: University of Madras (PhD); Tokiwa University (Post-graduate diploma)
- Occupations: Criminologist; Victimologist; Social activist
- Organization(s): International Foundation for Crime Prevention and Victim Care (PCVC)
- Known for: Activism against domestic violence
- Awards: Anne Klein Women's Award (2020)

Prasanna Gettu is an Indian criminologist, victimologist, and women right's activist from Chennai, India. Gettu is known for her work in supporting survivors of domestic violence and interpersonal violence. She is the co-founder and managing trustee of the International Foundation for Crime Prevention and Victim Care (PCVC), a Chennai-based non-governmental organization. In 2020, she was awarded the Anne Klein Women's Award for her work.

== Early life and education ==
Gettu holds a Master's degree in Geology and a PhD in Criminology from the University of Madras. Her 2002 doctoral thesis was titled "Corruption – A Public View", and focused on police corruption. Gettu's interest in criminology began at a young age, inspired by reading crime and murder stories.

Gettu also has a post-graduate diploma in Victimology and Victim Assistance from Tokiwa University in Japan, where she was part of the first batch of a program held by the World Society of Victimology. This course sparked her interest in focusing on the victims of crime and its need in India. She has also received professional training in domestic violence and crisis intervention.

== Career and activism ==
Gettu co-founded the International Foundation for Crime Prevention and Victim Care (PCVC) in Chennai in 2001, along with Usharani Mohan and Hema Ramachandran—victimologists she had met in Japan during her studies. The organization was established to provide support services for victims of crime, particularly women and queer individuals facing domestic and interpersonal violence.

In its first year, the majority of cases PCVC handled were related to domestic violence. This led Gettu and her colleagues to study shelter models in the United States to build specialized services in India. Since 2005, Gettu has been the managing trustee of PCVC, leading its operations with a board of members and staff.

Under her leadership, PCVC has grown to provide a wide range of services. The organization runs Dhwani, the National Domestic Violence Hotline, which operates 24/7 and offers confidential crisis counseling and information. PCVC also provides emergency, long-term, and transitional shelters for survivors and their children. The foundation offers a holistic, survivor-centric approach, providing legal and medical referrals, psychological support, and assistance with economic rehabilitation, including education and skill-building.

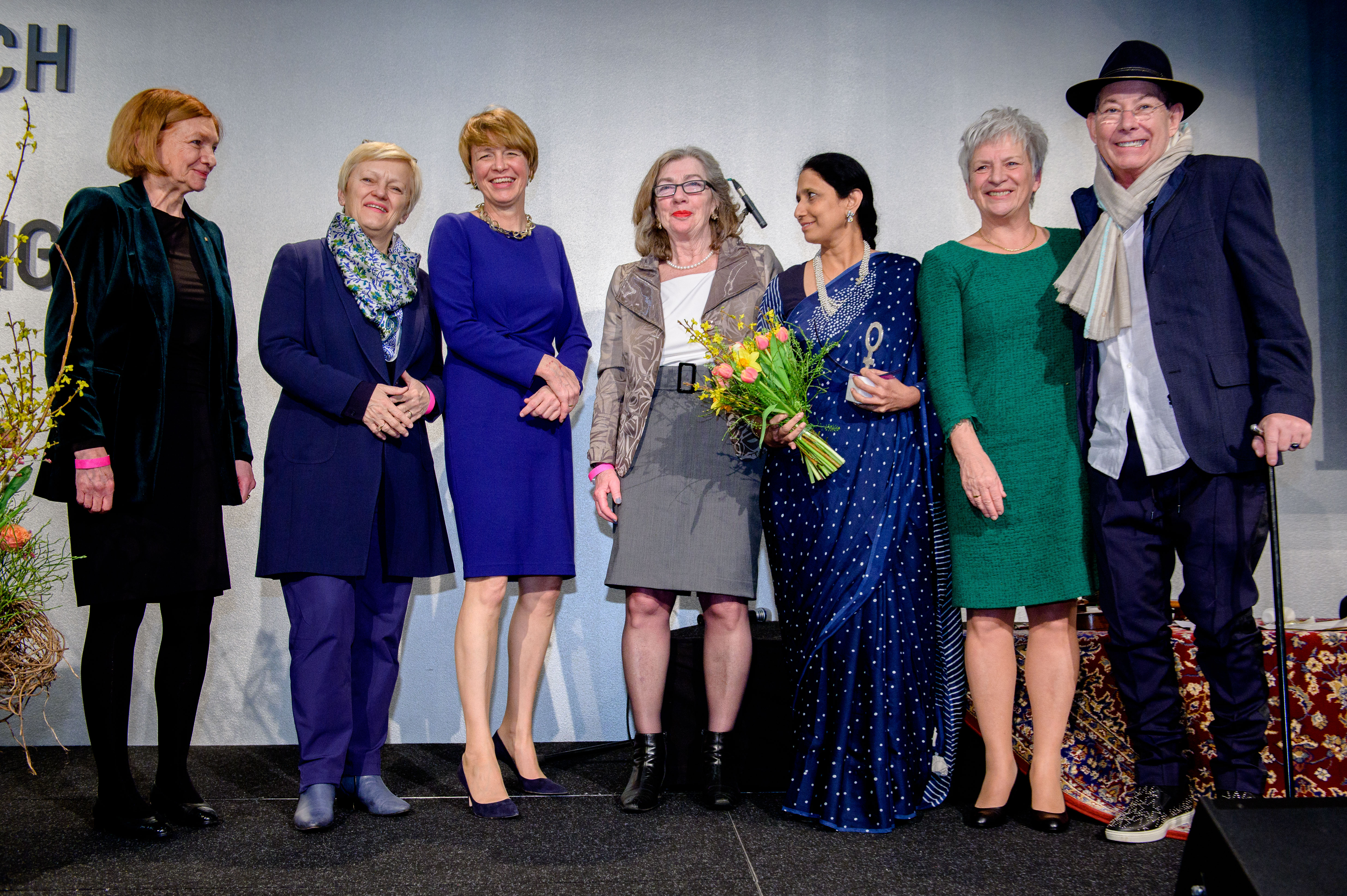
Prasanna Gettu (pictured with flowers) with members of Heinrich-Böll-Stiftung foundation.

Gettu is an advocate for changing societal attitudes towards domestic violence. She emphasizes that such violence is not restricted to any particular socioeconomic class and that survivors deserve to be treated with dignity. She is a proponent of creating support systems that empower survivors to make their own life decisions.

In addition to her work at PCVC, Gettu serves as an external member on the Internal Complaints Committee for the prevention of sexual harassment for over 50 companies and government departments.

== Recognition ==
In 2020, Gettu received the Anne Klein Women's Award from the Heinrich Böll Foundation. The jury recognized her as a "remarkable and courageous defender of human and women's rights, championing the right to a life free of violence, a life lived according to one's own wishes and in dignity and good health."

== Publications ==
Gettu has contributed to several publications on criminology and victimology. Her selected works include:

- "India: the state of criminology in a developing nation" in the Routledge handbook of International Criminology (2011).
- "White Collar Crimes: A Victimological Perspective" in Human Rights and Victimology (1998).
