= Kharshiing =

Kharshiing is a surname. Notable people with the surname include:

- Agnes Kharshiing (fl. 2013–2019), Indian women's rights activist from Meghalaya
- Robert Kharshiing (1959–2022), Indian politician
