= Nurser Öztunalı =

Turkish architect and feminism activist

Nurser Öztunali
- Born: 4 February 1947; Mersin, Turkey
- Died: 28 February 1999 (aged 52); Istanbul, Turkey
- Occupations: Architect, feminist, and publisher
- Spouse: Ali Şevket Bürkev

Nurser Öztunali (4 February 1947 – 28 February 1999) was a Turkish architect, feminist and publisher. A survivor of domestic violence herself, she became a vocal advocate against it and was one of the founders of a group that supported women's shelters for its victims in Turkey.

== Life ==
Nurser Öztunali was born in Mersin, Turkey, on 4 February 1947. While an architecture student at the Fine Arts State Academy, she married the physician Ali Şevket Bürkev in 1969 before graduating in 1972. They had two daughters together before divorcing her husband in 1981 because of "physical violence in her marriage". She died from a heart attack in Istanbul on 28 February 1999.

== Activities ==
Perhaps galvanized by her divorce, Öztunali became an outspoken feminist in the early 1980s and was one of the founders of Women's Circle Publications (Kadın Çevresi Yayınları) in 1984 that was intended produce feminist literature to educate the Turkish public about second-wave feminism. In 1987, she named the protests against domestic violence in Turkey that year "The Campaign Against Wife Beating", raising public awareness of the issue and women's rights in general. Öztunali was one of the founders of the Purple Roof Women's Shelter Foundation (Mor Çatı Kadın Sığınağı Vakfı) in 1990 and volunteered with it until her premature death in 1999.
