= Haenel =

Haenel is a surname. Notable people with the surname include:

- Adèle Haenel (born 1989), French actress
- Harold Haenel (born 1958), American sailor
- Hubert Haenel (born 1942), French politician
- Yannick Haenel (born 1967), French writer

== Companies ==
- C. G. Haenel, German arms company

== See also ==
- Hänel
