= Gisela Burckhardt =

German human rights activist (born 1951)

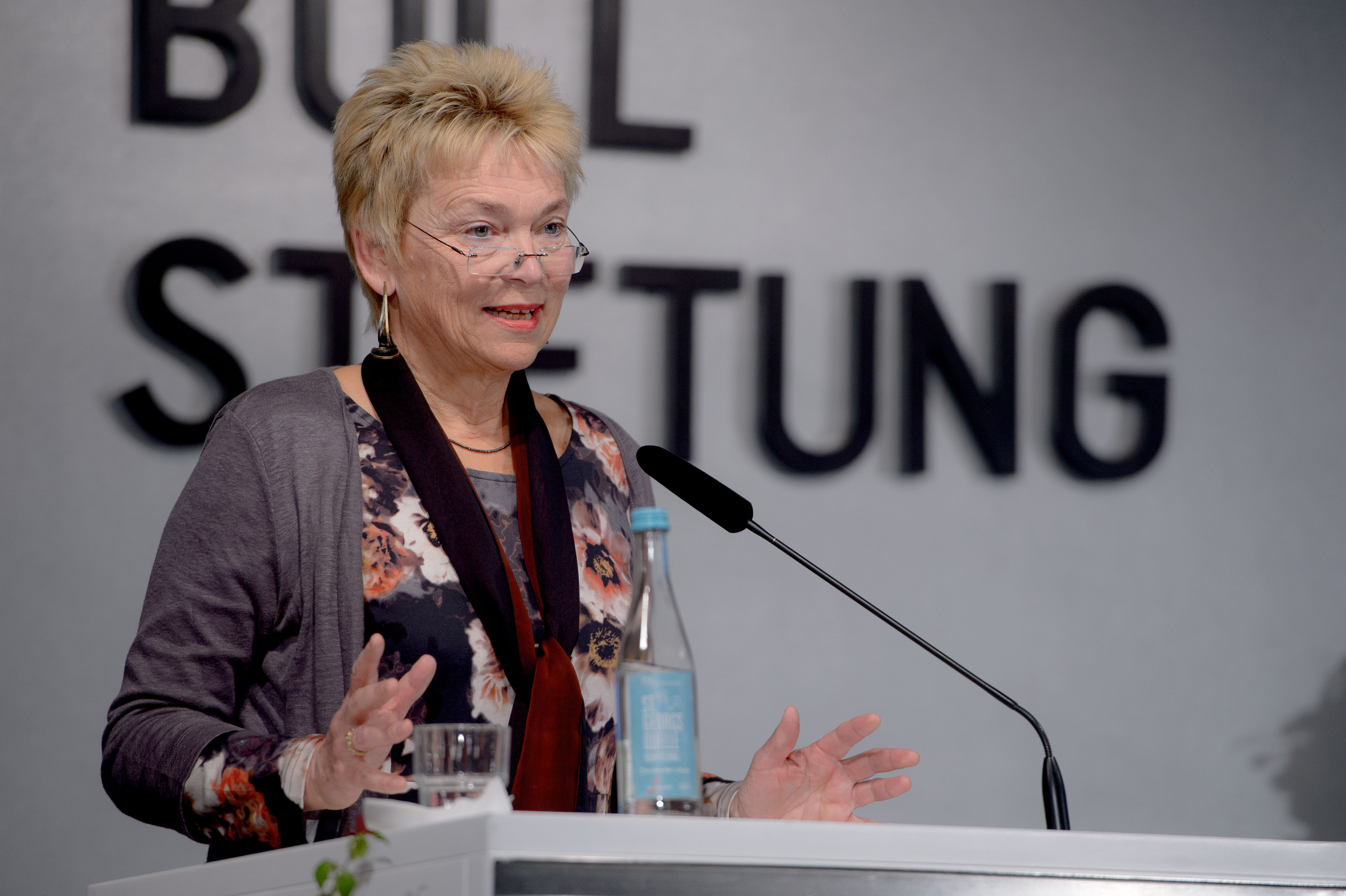
- Burckhardt receiving the Anne Klein Women's Award in 2016
- Born: 2 February 1951 (age 75); Aachen, North Rhine-Westphalia, West Germany
- Monuments: Germany
- Occupation: Human rights activist
- Years active: 1981–present
- Organization(s): FEMNET; Clean Clothes Campaign
- Known for: Advocating for the rights of textile workers
- Awards: Anne Klein Women's Award (2016)

Gisela Burckhardt (born 2 February 1951) is a German human rights activist. After spending many years working as a development policy consultant in Nicaragua, Pakistan and Ethiopia, since 2001 she has campaigned for the rights of textile workers in Southeast Asia. In recognition of her activism, Burckhardt received the 2016 Anne Klein Women's Award from the Heinrich Böll Foundation.

== Early life and education ==
Burckhardt was born and raised in Aachen in North Rhine-Westphalia, West Germany. She trained as a teacher in Freiburg im Breisgau and spent several years travelling. Burckhardt was in Argentina during the 1976 coup d'état, and was briefly detained by military forces.

Burckhardt is married and has two children. She lives in Bonn.

== Activism ==
Between 1981 and 1984, Burckhardt worked as a development policy consultant for the United Nations Development Programme in Nicaragua. Between 1985 and 1986, she was based in Pakistan, where she was employed by the German Agency for Technical Cooperation. From 1999 until 2001, Burckhardt worked for the German Adult Education Association's Institute for International Cooperation, based in Ethiopia.

In 2001, Burckhardt became a member of the Clean Clothes Campaign (CCC); in 2010, she founded FEMNET, a core component of the CCC, which advocated for feminist perspectives to be acknowledged concerning the textiles industry. Burckhardt has advocated for better working conditions in the global garment and sporting goods industries, particularly in India, Bangladesh and Cambodia, and has highlighted additional factors impacting upon the primarily female workforce, including being exploited by male managers and experiencing gender-based violence. Burckhardt has advocated for the voices of workers to be included in audits and assessments of textile factories by German companies.

In 2015, Burckhardt published the non-fiction book Todschick (German for "deadly chic"), about the experiences of textile workers in Bangladesh, including the Rana Plaza collapse in 2013. It also addressed greenwashing by businesses such as H&M and Hugo Boss, and noted a commonly incorrect correlation that higher-end brands were less exploitative of workers.

In 2018, Burckhardt was on the jury of the 2018 German Sustainability Award. Burckhardt is a member of the German government's Textile Partnership.

== Recognition ==
In 2016, Burckhardt received the Anne Klein Women's Award from the Heinrich Böll Foundation. That same year, she was named one of "25 Women Who Are Making Our World a Better Place" by Edition F.

In 2020, Burckhardt received the Federal Cross of Merit from the German government.
