= Barbara Unmüßig =

German political scientist

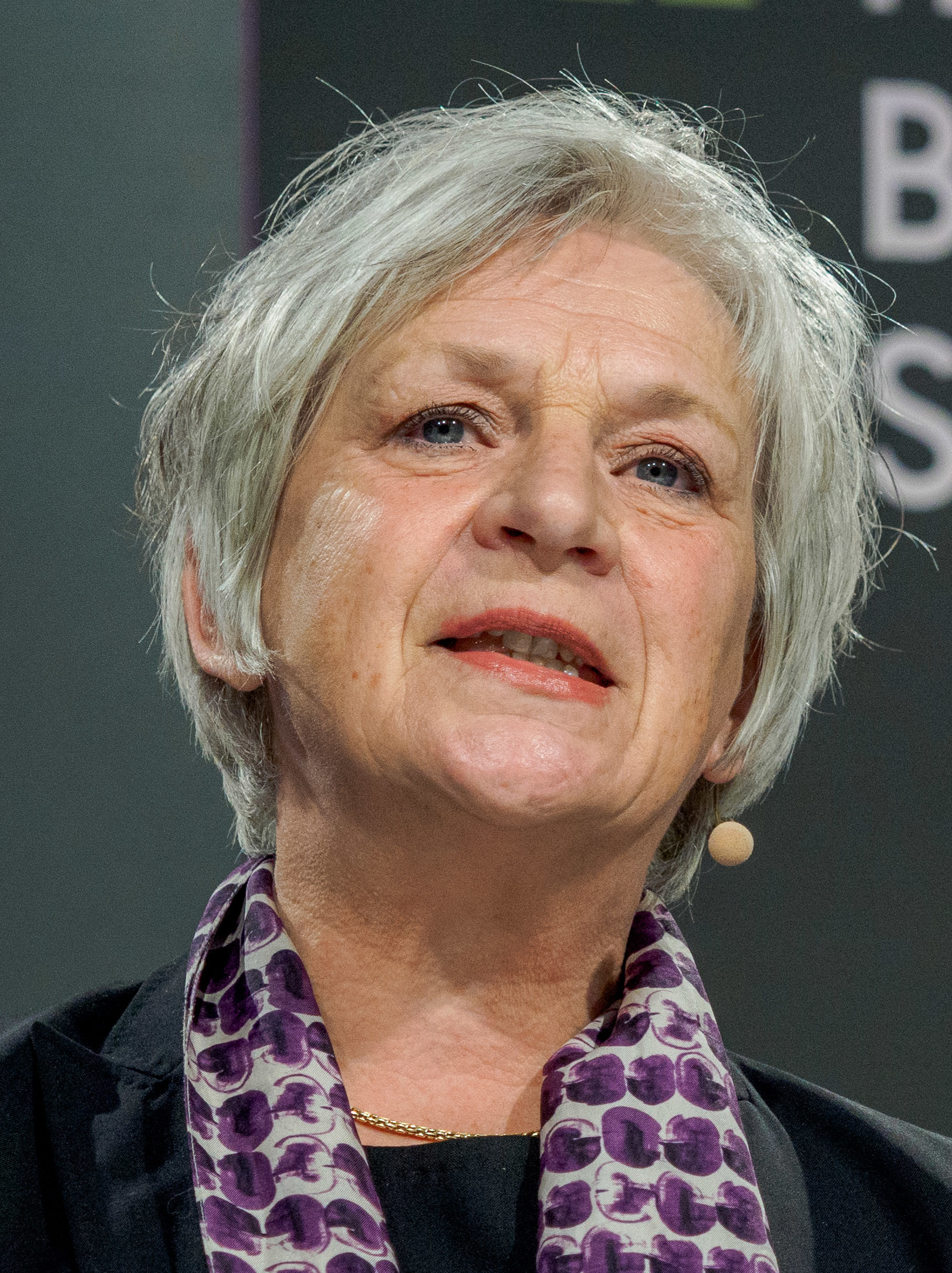
Image of Barbara Unmüßig

Barbara Unmüßig (born 1956 in Freiburg im Breisgau) is a German political scientist and from 2002 to 2022 board member of the Heinrich Böll Foundation.

== Biography ==
Unmüßig grew up as a working-class child and studied Political Science at the Free University of Berlin. In 1983, she became editor of the north–south political magazine blätter des iz3w and research assistant at Aktion Dritte Welt e.V. in Freiburg.

From 1985 she was a research assistant to Uschi Eid and until 1990 to Ludger Volmer, a member of Grünen in Bundestag, specialising in north–south policy and international environmental policy.

In 1990, she founded the organisation Weltwirtschaft, Ökologie und Entwicklung e.V. (WEED) and from 1993 - until her retirement in 2002 - was its Executive Chairwoman. To this day, she is co-editor of the information letter Weltwirtschaft & Entwicklung.

In 1991, Unmüßig became head of a project position at the UN Conference on Environment and Development (UNCED), the German Nature Conservation Ring (DNR) and the Bundes für Umwelt und Naturschutz Deutschland. She was also involved in the UN Conference on Environment and Development in Rio de Janeiro.

In 2000, she co-founded the German Institute for Human Rights (DIMR) and was a member of the Board of Trustees from 2001 to 2016, becoming deputy chair of the board in 2009.

Since 2009, she has been a member of the jury for the Helene Weber Prize for Young Women in Local Politics.

Since 2013, Barbara Unmüßig has been a member of the board of trustees of forum Nachhaltig Wirtschaften, a magazine dedicated to shaping a sustainable future.

Since 2016, Barbara Unmüßig has been a member of the advisory board of the Arnold Bergstraesser Institute.

She has been a member of the general assembly since 1996 and was chair of the supervisory board of the Heinrich Böll Foundation in Berlin from 1996 to 2001. From 2002 to 2022 she was a board member of the Heinrich Böll Foundation, initially together with Ralf Fücks and from July 2017 together with Ellen Ueberschär.

== Board of the Heinrich Böll Foundation ==
Barbara Unmüßig has been a board member of the Heinrich Böll Foundation since 2002.

She was responsible for the Foundation's international work in Latin America, Africa, Asia and the Middle East & North Africa as well as the Gunda Werner Institute for Feminism and Gender Democracy. She was strategically responsible for the foundation's thematic priorities of fair globalisation, human and women's rights, international climate, resource and agricultural policy as well as democracy policy.

She was the jury chairwoman of the Anne Klein Women's Prize, which the Heinrich Böll Foundation has awarded annually since 2012 to women who have distinguished themselves through outstanding commitment, courage and civil courage for the realisation of gender democracy, the rights and self-determination of lesbians, gays, transsexuals and intersexuals.

== Publications ==
Barbara Unmüßig is actively and regularly involved in the debate on the strategy and programme of Bündnis 90/Die Grünen on issues of global justice, environmental and climate policy, gender policy and development policy.

She regularly publishes books, speeches and journal articles on issues of international climate and environmental policy, global governance, global justice, human rights, gender and democracy policy. Most recently, together with Lili Fuhr and Thomas Fatheuer, she published the book "Kritik der Grünen Ökonomie"
