= Awa Fall-Diop =

Senegalese human rights activist (born 1956)

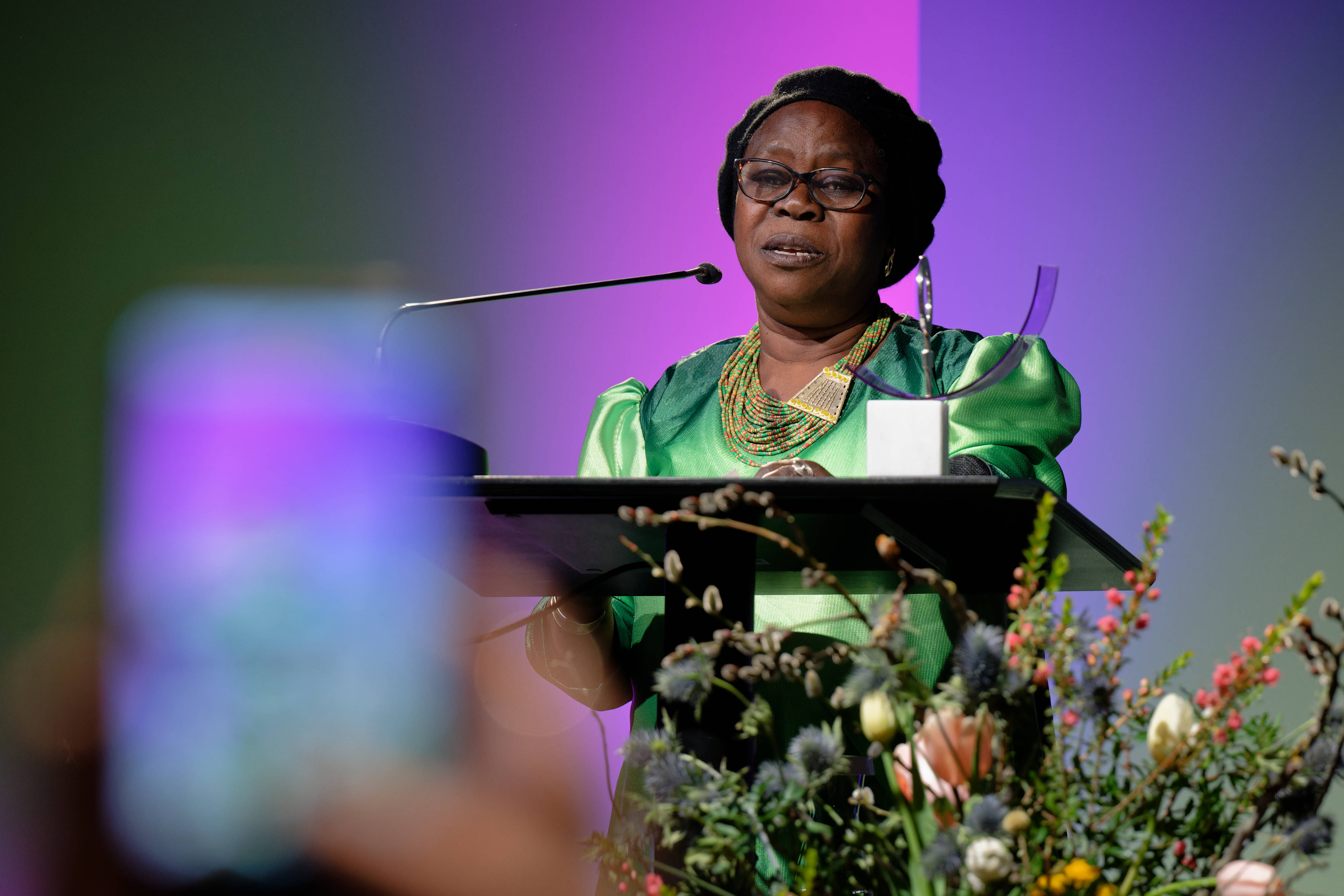
- Fall-Diop receiving the Anne Klein Prize in 2026
- Born: 25 September 1956 (age 69); Dakar, French Senegal
- Citizenship: Senegal
- Education: Cheikh Anta Diop University
- Occupations: Teacher; Activist
- Years active: 1977–present
- Organization: Observatory of Gender Relations in Senegal
- Known for: Campaigning for women's rights in Senegal
- Title: Minister for Relations with National and Sub-Regional Parliamentary Institutions
- Term: 2005–2007
- Honours: Anne Klein Prize for Women

Awa Fall-Diop (born 25 September 1956) is a Senegalese human rights activist and former teacher. The founder of the Observatory of Gender Relations in Senegal, she has advocated for equal rights for Senegalese women. In recognition of her activism, in 2026 Fall-Diop received the Anne Klein Women's Award from the Heinrich Böll Foundation.

== Early life and education ==
Fall-Diop was born in 1956 in Dakar in what was then French Senegal. Raised in a working-class neighbourhood, her mother was a local activist who had campaigned for the area to be electrified, in addition to establishing a meeting place for residents to discuss issues facing the community.

Fall-Diop completed her teacher training in 1976; in 1984, she formally received her teaching certification from the Ministry of National Education. In 1980, Fall-Diop graduated with a degree in economics from Cheikh Anta Diop University. Between 1977 and 2005, she worked as a primary school teacher at the École Algor Dioum and the École Gibraltar in Diourbel.

== Activism ==
As a young teacher, Fall-Diop joined several Marxist and Pan-African trade unions and organisations, within which she campaigned for the improvement of living conditions for working women. This included launching a petition demanding their equal access to social security to their male co-workers. Fall-Diop has been imprisoned for her activism.

Fall-Diop later founded the Observatory of Gender Relations in Senegal (French: Observatoire des Relations de Genre au Sénégal), through which she led a public campaign to better integrate different gender perspectives into the Senegalese school curriculum. This included revising educational content to strengthen its representation of women, such as replacing images of women as wives and mothers with them as scientists and astronauts. Fall-Diop also called for teachers to be trained in gender-neutral teaching.

In 2005, Fall-Diop stopped her teaching career to act as Minister for Relations with National and Sub-Regional Parliamentary Institutions. This position included responsibility for coordinating and mediating between the Senegalese government, parliament, and regional parliamentary bodies. Fall-Diop remained in the position until 2007.

Fall-Diop has campaigned to raise awareness of gender-related violence and abuse, particularly of its psychological and social dimensions. In 2026, Fall-Diop launched the Luy Jot Jotna (Wolof for "it's time") campaign calling for action against femicides and violence against women.

Fall-Diop has said that the only strong feminism is inclusive feminism, including lesbians, and she has criticised the amount of lesbians who have fled Senegal due to concerns about their safety. Fall-Diop is a member of the Forum of African Feminists and the Forum of Senegalese Feminists. She has advised various groups, including the African Women's Development Fund, MeToo International, Urgent Action Fund Africa, Centre ODAS, Femmes et Droits Humains, and Sœurs pour Sœurs – Tong Laa Taaba.

== Recognition ==
In 1996, Fall-Diop received the Ashoka Changemaker Award from Ashoka.

In 2026, Fall-Diop received the Anne Klein Prize for Women, awarded by the Heinrich Böll Foundation, in recognition of her commitment to defending women's rights, particularly gender equality; her work in education; and her work on gender in Senegal and Francophone West Africa. She received the award on 6 March 2026 in Berlin.
