= Imelda Marrufo =

Mexican human rights activist

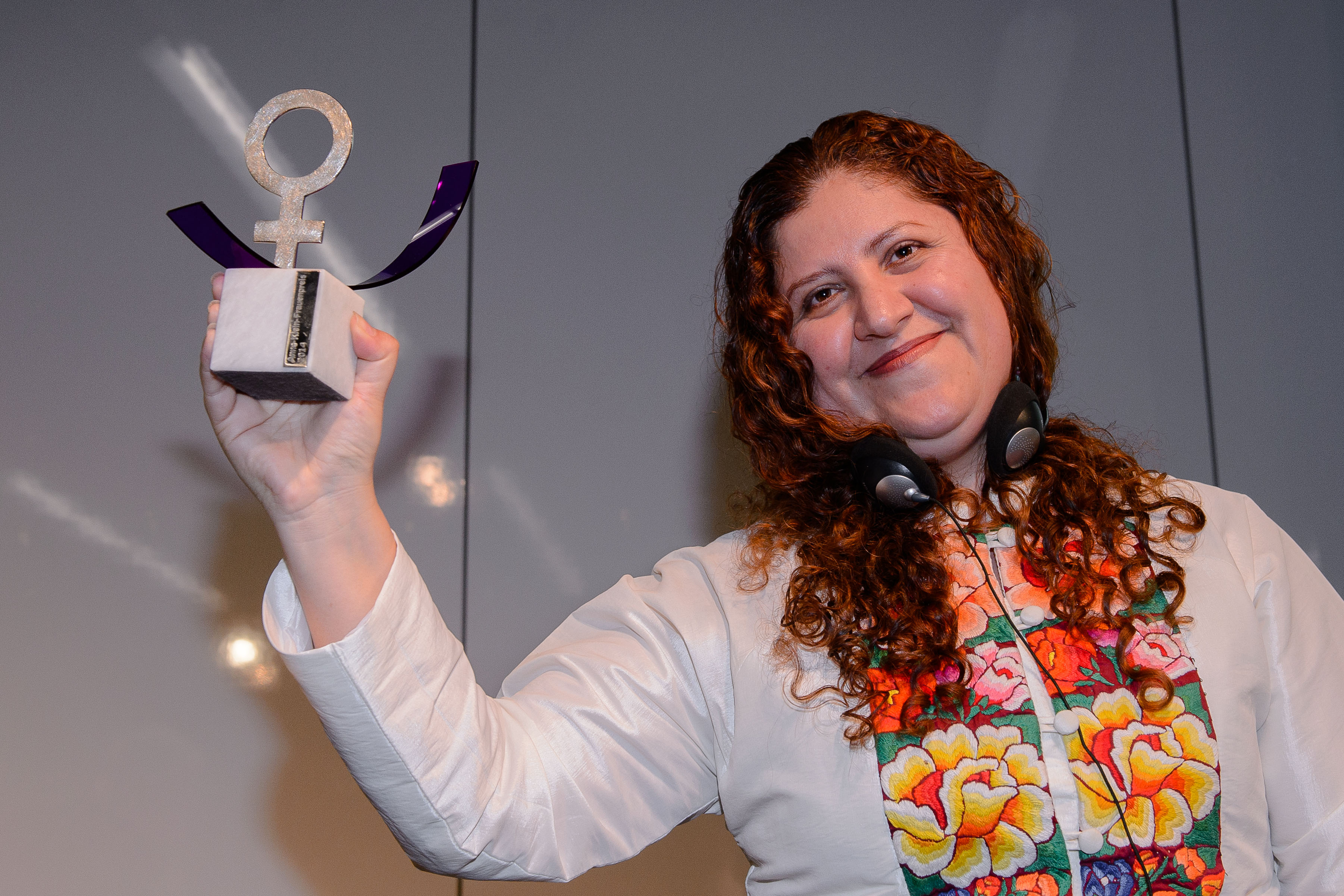
- Marrufo receiving the Anne Klein Women's Award in 2014
- Born: Ciudad Juárez, Chihuahua, Mexico
- Education: Universidad Autónoma de Ciudad Juárez
- Occupations: Human rights activist Lawyer
- Years active: 1995–present
- Organization: Red Mesa de Mujeres
- Known for: Documenting femicide in Ciudad Juárez
- Awards: Anne Klein Women's Award (2014)

Imelda Marrufo Nava is a Mexican human rights activist. She is known for her work campaigning against gender-based violence and femicide in the city of Ciudad Juárez, for which she received the 2014 Anne Klein Women's Award from the Heinrich Böll Foundation.

== Early life and education ==
Marrufo was born in Ciudad Juárez, Chihuahua, Mexico, and was raised in the city's Emiliano Zapata neighbourhood. She studied at Altavista High School, before graduating with a degree in law from the Universidad Autónoma de Ciudad Juárez in 1995.

== Activism ==
While still a student, Marrufo started a group that documented femicides that had happened in Ciudad Juárez, with the goal of giving names, faces and histories to the names of murdered women. In 2001, after a mass grave of missing women was found near the city, Marrufo established Red Mesa de Mujeres (Spanish for "Women's Roundtable Network"), a network of civil society organisations that supported women in vulnerable situations, as well as the families of missing, murdered, or trafficked women. This included providing therapeutic services, such as art therapy; financial support to commemorate the birthdays and anniversaries of disappeared women; and supporting the families, as well as human rights activists, through the legal process. Through her role as a board member, Marrufo additionally worked on promoting strategic litigation, as well as public policies and international mechanisms, to address issues of femicide, gender-based violence, and access to justice.

Additionally, Red Mesa de Mujeres continues Marrufo's university work of documenting and tracking femicides in Ciudad Juárez, using newspaper articles and statistics provided by the Chihuahua state attorney general.

== Recognition ==
In 2014, Marrufo won the Anne Klein Women's Award from the Heinrich Boll Foundation, in recognition of her work against gender-based violence in Ciudad Juárez and Chihuahua, as well as addressing the impunity of perpetrators, particularly in efforts to get femicide recognised as its own criminal offence.

In 2023, Marrufo received the Human Rights Defender Award from Juárez City Council in recognition of her two decades spent leading Mesa de Mujeres, from the mayor, Cruz Pérez Cuéllar.
