= Hanel =

Hanel is a surname. Notable people with the surname include:

- Birgitte Hanel (born 1954), Danish rower
- Elke Hanel-Torsch (born 1981), Austrian politician
- Linda Hanel (born 1961), Australian swimmer
- Margot Hanel, wife of Karin Boye
- Sue Hanel, musician
- Rudolf Hanel (born 1897), Austrian association football player

== See also ==
- Hanel Field, airport in Oregon, United States
- Hänel
