= Ellen Ueberschär =

German Evangelical Theologian

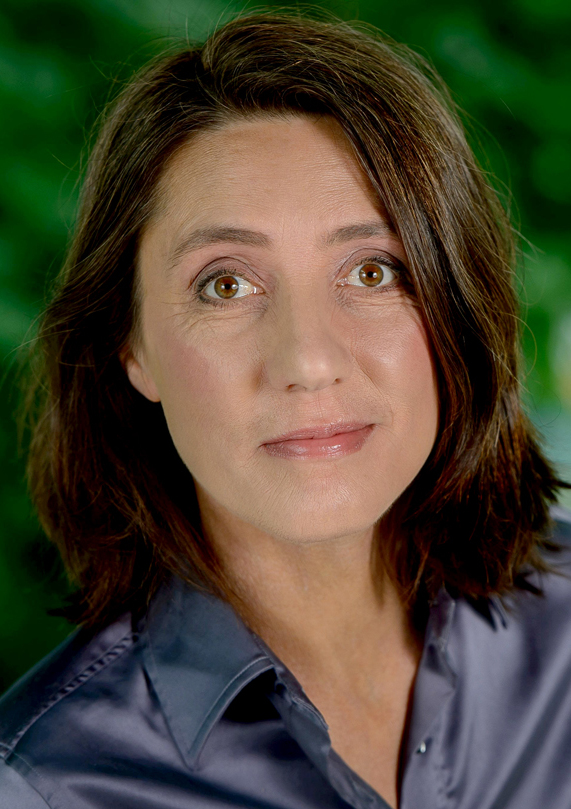
Ellen Ueberschär

Ellen Ueberschär is a German Evangelical Theologian.

== Early life and education ==
Ueberschär was born in 1967 in East Berlin where she also grew up. After finishing school she intended to study medicine, yet the East German authorities refused permission. In 1988 she began to study theology at the Sprachenkonvikt Berlin. After reunification she continued her studies at Heidelberg University as well as in Berlin, graduating in 1995.

Between November 1995 and March 1997 Ueberschär was a fellow with Studienstiftung and, until 2001, a junior researcher with the theology faculty at University of Marburg, where she obtained her doctorate with a thesis on evangelical youth work in East Germany between 1945 and 1961. Her thesis received an award of excellence from Marburg University.

== Professional life ==
Between 2004 and 2006 Ellen Ueberschär was director of studies in theology, ethics, and law at the Loccum Evangelical Academy. Since 2006 she is Secretary General of the German Evangelical Church Assembly.

On 25 November 2016 she, along with Barbara Unmüßig, was elected co-president of the Heinrich Böll Foundation and took office in July 2017.

== Family ==
Ellen Ueberschär is married and the mother of one child.
