= Nebahat Akkoç =

Turkish human rights activist (born 1955)

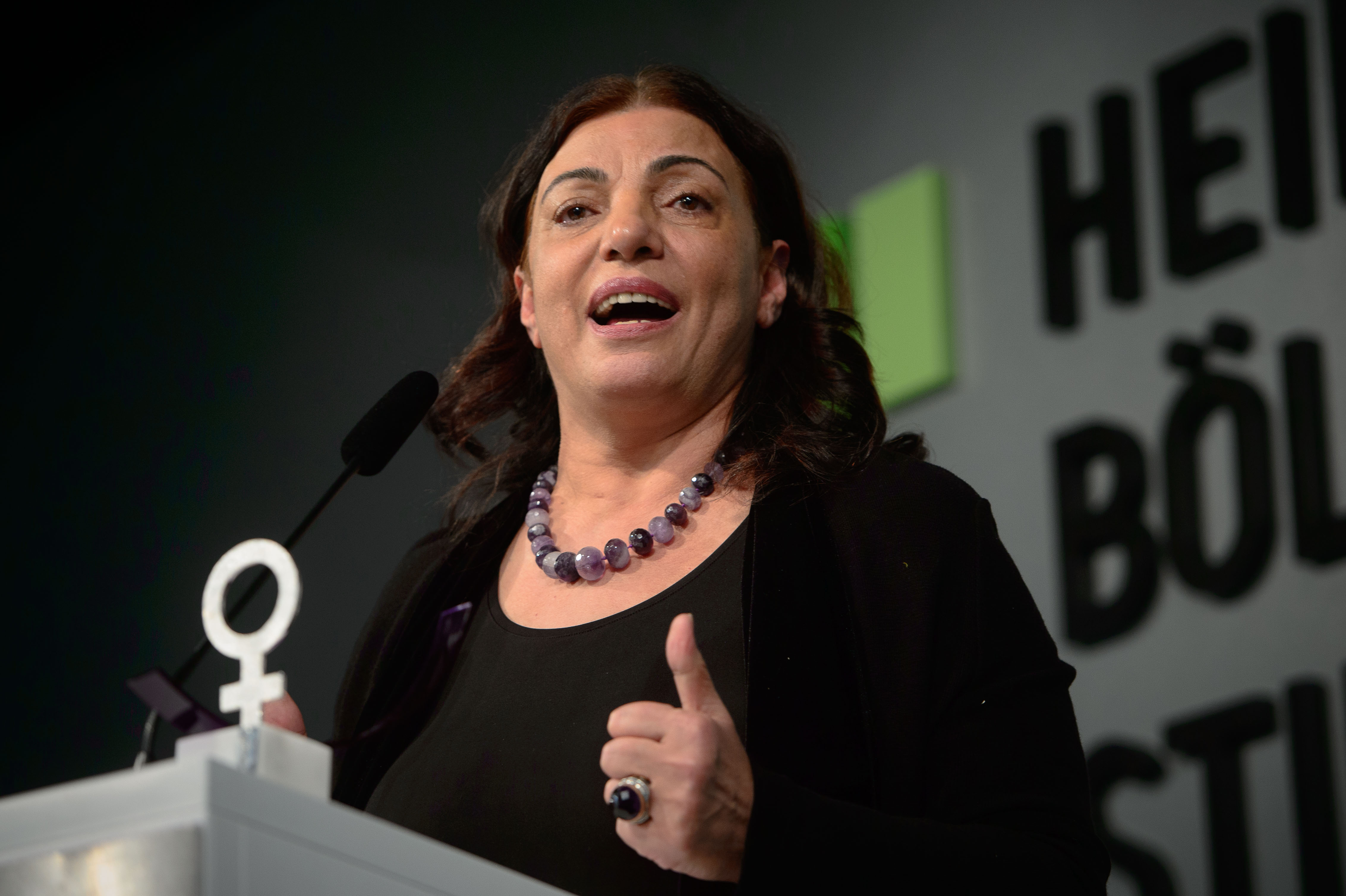
- Akkoç receiving the Anne Klein Women's Award in 2015
- Born: 1955 (age 70–71); Karlıova, Bingöl Province, Turkey
- Education: Anadolu University
- Occupations: Teacher; Trade unionist
- Years active: 1970s–present
- Organization: KAMER
- Known for: Supporting victims of domestic abuse
- Spouse: Zübeyir Akkoç (married 1970s–1993; his death)
- Children: 2
- Awards: Anne Klein Women's Award (2015)

Nebahat Akkoç (born 1955) is a Turkish human rights activist and former trade unionist. A teacher by profession, she experienced persecution following the 1980 coup d'état and its subsequent ban on trade unions. Following the murder of her husband in 1993, Akkoç became a human rights activist, for which she was recognised with the Anne Klein Women's Award in 2015.

== Early life and education ==
Akkoç was born in 1955 in Karlıova, a municipality of Bingöl Province. Born into a Kurdish family, she is of Armenian and Alevi descent. Akkoç attended school in the Hazro and Silvan districts of Diyarbakır. During the 1970s, Akkoç trained as a teacher at the Eskişehir Institute of Education, and subsequently worked as a teacher in Mardin until the 1990s.

Akkoç was married to Zübeyir Akkoç, a teacher, until his death in 1993. They had two children together.

== Activism ==
After qualifying as a teacher, Akkoç became a member of Tüm Öğretmenler Birleşme ve Dayanışma Derneği (TÖB-DER), a trade union for teachers. TÖB-DER was banned following the 1980 coup d'état, which led to martial law being declared and a military junta being installed. As a trade union leader, as well as a Kurd, Akkoç's husband was imprisoned for an extended period at Diyarbakır Prison, while Akkoç herself was also frequently detained and sexually assaulted. During her husband's time in prison, Akkoç became aware of the discrimination experienced by Kurdish people in Turkish prisons; she began to support Kurdish prisoners and their families by acting as an interpreter for those who didn't speak Turkish.

In 1989, democracy was fully restored in Turkey; the following year, trade unions were legalised. Akkoç subsequently became the regional head of the Education and Science Workers' Union in 1991. During that time, Akkoç and other teacher trade unionists were frequently harassed by Turkish authorities; this culminated in 1993 with the murder of Akkoç's husband, who was shot dead while travelling to the school he worked at.

Following her husband's murder, Akkoç decided to commit herself to human rights. Between 1994 and 1996, she served on the board of the Human Rights Association. During her tenure, she was detained 15 times, including a period of 10 days wherein she was tortured. Akkoç became the first Turkish person to make an application to the European Court of Human Rights, concerning the murder of her husband; her own torture; and violation of her freedom of thought. In 1999, the EHCR found the Turkish government liable, and ordered it to pay Akkoç compensation.

In 1997, Akkoç founded the KAMER Foundation, a Turkish-Kurdish non-governmental organisation that initially supported Kurdish victims and survivors of domestic abuse. The name KAMER stemmed from two Turkish words, kadın and merkezi, meaning "women's centre". Following the calming in relations between the Turkish govertnment and Kurdish groups, KAMER expanded beyond Kurdish areas, offering services in 23 of Turkey's provinces, including Diyarbakır Province, Mardin Province, Batman Province and Bingöl Province, and 44 of its cities. KAMER now offers psychological and legal counselling for victims of domestic abuse; access to shelters and resources for economic self-sufficiency; as well as support for perpetrators of abuse. Akkoç had previously been one of the co-founders of the Mor Çatı Foundation, established in 1990 to provide shelters to victims of domestic abuse.

== Recognition ==
In 2004, Akkoç received the Ginetta Sagan Fund of 20, 000 USD, in recognition of her work to protect the "lives and liberty" of women.

In 2015, Akkoç received the Anne Klein Women's Award from the Heinrich Böll Foundation, in recognition for her work against state violence and domestic abuse. In 2019, Akkoç received the International Hrant Dink Award, alongside Indian activist Agnes Kharshiing. In 2021, Akkoç was named as one of the laureates of the Franco-German Prize for Human Rights and the Rule of Law from the German and French governments.

Additionally, TIME magazine named Akkoç as one of its "heroes of the modern age".
