= Anne Klein Women's Award =

Annual prize for a woman of any nationality committed to gender democracy

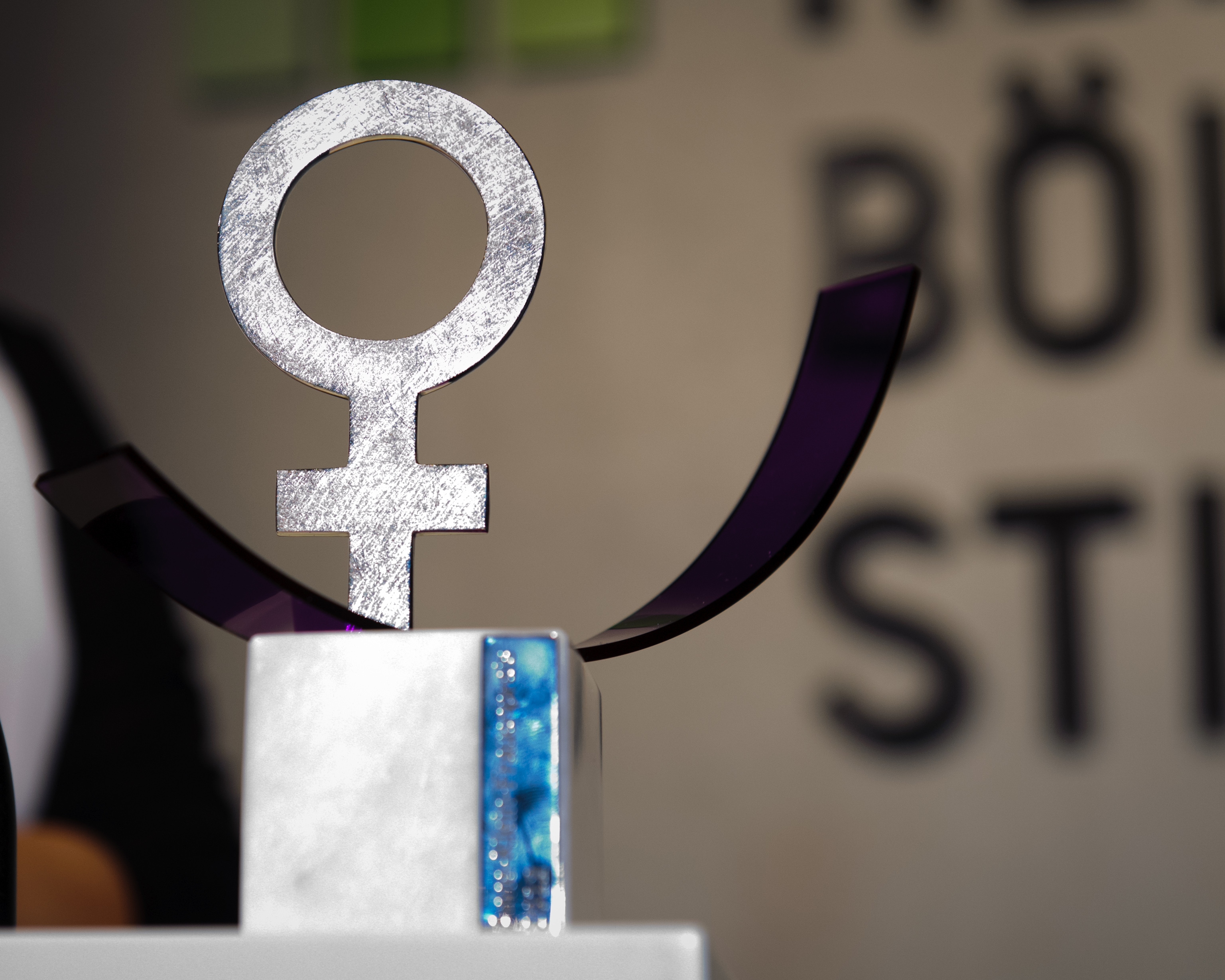
- Awarded for: women of any nationality who are committed to gender democracy
- Sponsored by: Heinrich Böll Foundation
- Location: Germany
- First award: 2012
- Website: https://www.boell.de/de/stiftung/anne-klein-frauenpreis

The Anne Klein Women's Award is given by the Heinrich Böll Foundation to women from anywhere in the world who are committed to gender democracy. The award was named after Anne Klein the German lawyer and State Senator. The prize includes €10,000 and is decided on by a five-member jury. Candidates for the award come from: "Realizing gender democracy, eliminating discrimination based on gender and gender identity, political commitment to realizing women's, human and freedom rights, promoting women and girls in science and research . "

== Winners ==
Year	Winner	Awarded for
2012	Nivedita Prasad	lecturer and activist for women's and human rights
2013	Lepa Mladjenovic	feminist activist
2014	Imelda Marrufo	feminist activist
2015	Nebahat Akkoç	activist against state and domestic violence and for human and women's rights
2016	Gisela Burckhardt	women's rights activist and founder of the FEMNET association for the rights of women workers in the global textile industry
2017	Nomarussia Bonase	activist against apartheid in South Africa, women's rights activist
2018	Jineth Bedoya Lima; Mayerlis Angarita Robles	Colombian journalists who independently campaigned for women
2019	Kristina Hänel	German general medicine and emergency physician
2020	Prasanna Gettu	criminologist, human rights activist and women's rights activist from Chennai, India
2021	Canan Arın	Turkish women's rights defender
2022	Yosra Frawes	Lawyer in Tunisia
2023	Joumana Seif	Syrian Lawyer
2024	Julija Sporysch	Ukrainian sociologist, feminist, and activist
2025	Iryna Alchouka, Darja Afanassjewa, and Julija Mizkewitsch	Belarusian human rights activists
2026	Awa Fall-Diop	Senegalese human rights activist
