= Agnes Kharshiing =

Indian women's rights activist

- Born: Shillong, Meghalaya, India
- Known for: Activism
- Parent(s): Martin Narayan Majaw, Edith Kharshiing
- Relatives: John Filmore Kharshiing

Agnes Kharshiing is a women's rights activist from Meghalaya, India.

== Activism ==
Her outspoken advocacy and leadership of protests for women's and communities' rights has been linked to her detainment.

She has led sit-ins in protest against government evictions of local communities from land. She has spoken out against corporal punishment and bullying in schools. She condemned the appointment of MLA Julius Dorphang, who allegedly raped a 14-year-old girl, as a member of the Assembly Privilege Committee in Meghalaya.

She is the President of the Civil Society Women's Organization (CSWO).

She was arrested then released in March 2013 for use of criminal force to deter a public servant from discharging his duty, as well as criminal trespass. She told reporters that as member of a committee on justice, formed as part of Meghalaya Legal Service Authority, she was trying to help the parents of a rape victim access a media centre. She protested against the eviction drive conducted by Meghalaya Urban Development Authority, for which she was arrested on 9 November 2013.

She was involved in exposing graft and lack of transparency in child nutrition programs. She advocated for programs supporting local food rather than use of contractors. She organised a rescue mission to Radhamadhab Road – a red-light district in Silchar, Assam – to deter a growth in child sex trafficking. Prior to this, she had been interacting with a 16 year old survivor who had escaped from Radhamadhab Road.

Fellow activist Angela Rangad said Kharshiing's 2013 arrests were attempts "to suppress any attempt of asking questions and bringing to light largescale illegal deals and land grabs."

In 2018, she and fellow activist Anita Sangma were assaulted in East Jaintia Hills district by a pro-mining group implicated in illegal mining operations, after she and Sangma had filed a police complaint about illegal mining and coal transportation. According to the Hindustan Times, Kharshiing had stopped at multiple places to take pictures of stocked coal, and was attacked after stopping near Sohshrieh after seeing trucking carrying coal. They were ambushed by about 30-40 men, who dragged her and Sangma out of their cab and started beating them up. The cab driver left and informed the police in Jowai of the attack. Sangma suffered blunt force trauma about 7-9 cm deep to the scalp. She was in critical condition and was hospitalised for over a month. As a result of the attack, Kharshiing lost her sense of smell.

In 2019, Kharshiing, along with Turkish women's rights activist Nebahat Akkoç, was given the 11th International Hrant Dink Award by the Hrant Dink Foundation.

== Personal life ==
Kharshiing's brother Robert was a member of the Rajya Sabha representing Meghalaya for the Indian National Congress.
