= Nivedita Prasad =

German sociologist and human rights activist

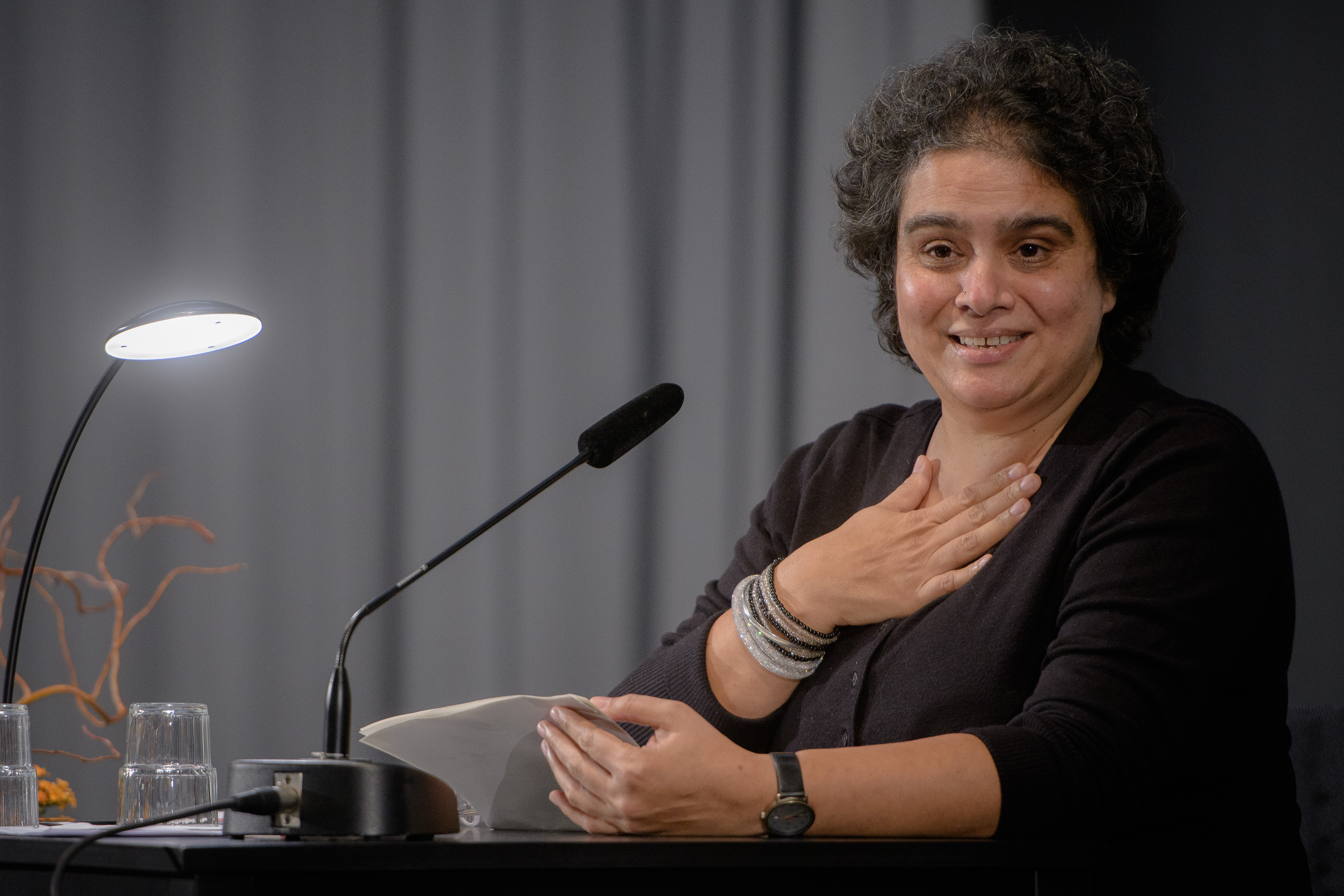
Nivedita Prasad

Nivedita Prasad (born 1967) is a German sociologist and human rights activist. She is professor of methods and gender-specific social work at the Alice Salomon University of Applied Sciences Berlin, and a specialist in the human rights of migrant women.

== Life ==
Prasad studied sociology at the Free University of Berlin, and gained her PhD at the Carl von Ossietzky University of Oldenburg. Since 1993 she has taught at several universities in Germany, the Netherlands and Austria.

In 2012 Prasad received the first Anne Klein Women's Award, for her work on the human rights of migrant women. In 2013 she was appointed Professor at the Alice Salomon University of Applied Sciences Berlin, where she is active in social work with refugees and directs a masters' program in social work as a human rights profession. She has studied the migrant hostel opened in 2013 in Berlin-Hellersdorf, where there have been racist attacks and far-right protests.

In 2020 she was appointed to the advisory board of the Berlin-based NGO Center for Intersectional Justice.

== Works ==
- Mit Recht gegen Gewalt: die UN-Menschenrechte und ihre Bedeutung für die soziale Arbeit : ein Handbuch für die Praxis. Leverkusen: B. Budrich, 2011.
- (ed. with Iman Attia and Swantje Köbsell;) Dominanzkultur reloaded : neue Texte zu gesellschaftlichen Machtverhältnissen und ihren Wechselwirkungen. Bielefeld: Transcript Verlag, 2015.
- (ed.) Soziale Arbeit mit Geflüchteten: rassismuskritisch, professionell, menschenrechtsorientiert. Opladen: Verlag Barbara Budrich, 2018.
- (ed. with Katrin Muckenfuß and Andreas Foitzik) Recht vor Gnade Bedeutung von Menschenrechtsurteilen für die diskriminierungskritische (Soziale) Arbeit. Weinheim: Juventa, 2020.
