= Hänel =

Hänel is a German surname. Notable people with the surname include:

- Albert Hänel (1833–1918), German jurist and politician
- Erich Hänel (1915–2003), German footballer
- Horst-Ulrich Hänel (born 1957), German field hockey player
- Karin Hänel (born 1957), German long jumper
- Klaus Hänel (1936–2016), German footballer
- Kristina Hänel, (born 1956), German physician
- Marie-Louise Hänel Sandström (born 1968), Swedish politician
- Gustav Friedrich Hänel (1792–1878), German legal historian

== See also ==
- Hanel
