= KAMER Foundation =

Turkish women's rights group

The Kamer Foundation (Turkish: Kamer Vakfi), sometimes referred to as Ka-Mer, is a Turkish women's group that finds shelter for and offers legal aid to women who have been threatened by their relatives.

== Background ==
Founded in 1997, by Nebahat Akkoç, an elementary school teacher "who had become committed to the issue of Kurdish women's oppression through her and her husband's experiences with violence in the 1980s and 1990s" and is located in the city of Diyarbakir, Turkey. KAMER took a different approach to feminism in Turkey by turning away notional feminist issues and instead focusing on changing the Kurdish culture's social, cultural, and political view of women.

In the 1990s KA-MER grew alliances with Turkish and Kurdish feminist circles, which helped them, bring a greater awareness of the suicides and "killings committed under the guise of 'honor'" (honor killings) of young migrant Kurdish women. There was, however, severe tension between KA-MER and the more politically aware feminist circles. These feminists believe KA-MER to be ignorant to the reality of the Kurdish struggle and more of a "pragmatist, elite organization."

Today KA-MER is one of the most prominent women organizations in Turkey, recognized by international human rights groups, and is continuing the fight against honor killings and other forms of violence against women. With women centers available in all 23 provinces of Eastern and Southeastern Anatolia which offer services such as counseling, daycare, and employment opportunities to help increase women's ability to become more financially independent. These women's centers also work with the entire family, including the husbands, in order to motivate the acceptance of a women's independence and the view that women can make a valuable contribution to society. KA-MERS mission "is to identify those cultural and traditional practices, which are shaped by sexist values and are harmful to women and children, to develop their alternatives, and to ensure their implementation."

We have to bring these killings out from the shadows and teach women about their rights. The laws have been changed, but the culture here will not change overnight. — Ayten Tekay, a caseworker for Ka-Mer in Diyarbakır.

== See also ==
- Honor killings
- Honor suicide
- Snow (Pamuk novel)
