= Şirin Tekeli =

Turkish feminist and academician

- Born: 28 February 1944; Ankara, Turkey
- Died: 4 December 2017 (aged 73); Bodrum, Turkey
- Spouse: Ahmet Tekeli (m. 1966; died 2010)
- Awards: Ordre des Palmes Académiques

Şirin Tekeli (28 February 1944, Ankara – 13 June 2017, Bodrum) was a feminist, academician, translator, writer, activist and one of the pioneers of second wave feminism in Turkey.

== Career ==
In 1967, she returned to Turkey and became the first female academician to enter the Chair in political science at Istanbul University. In 1973, she obtained her PhD with a thesis on David Easton's System Theory. In 1978, she obtained her associate professor title with her, at the time "controversial", habilitation thesis on women’s participation to politics named "Kadınlar ve Siyasal Toplumsal Hayat". (Women and Political Social Life). This thesis, had a great effect on her ideology, she recalls :

"I was a 'timid feminist' but by the time I finished it I saw clearly that women were being oppressed, exploited and excluded from the public sphere. It was not capitalism that was doing this, it was male dominance."

After her thesis, she started working on elections. She returned to France and spent the academic year 1979–1980 at the Scientific Research National Center (Centre National de la Recherche Scientifique) (CNRS) with a scholarship, learning cartography. She, during this period, formed a computer database, with all the data concerning the elections in Turkey, and studied the sociology of elections in urban areas with Jean Ranger and his team. In 1980-81 she organized a seminar on the sociology of politics

== Activism ==
After she left academia, she began an active role in the feminist movement of Turkey. Seeing the 80s as the "years of action", she dedicated herself to improve women's rights and raise awareness in Turkey via campaigns and protests. In the 90s, "the years of institutionalisation", as she calls them, have started: Tekeli focused on creating associations and foundations.

=== Years of action ===
Following Turkey’s decision on not changing the civic law in accordance with the Convention on the Elimination of All Forms of Discrimination Against Women(CEDAW), in 1986 she took part in a petition demanding changes in the constitution, laws and practice, in accordance with the contract.

On 17 May 1987, she participated in the first legal protest after the military coup, and demanded an end to domestic violence.

== Awards ==
In 1996, she was awarded with Ordre des Palmes Académiques by the Cultural Ministry of France.

== Personal life and death ==
Şirin Tekeli was married to lawyer Ahmet Tekeli, with whom she met while studying at University of Lausanne. Her marriage lasted until 2010, when Ahmet Tekeli died. For his memory, Şirin Tekeli used the assets he left to her to found the Şirin-Ahmet Tekeli Association for Supporting Women Lawyers

In 2017, Sabancı University Gender and the Women's Studies Center began granting a research award in memory of Şirin Tekeli: "The Şirin Tekeli Research Award". This award was created to support and promote research focusing on gender in Turkey.
