= Zhang Sizhi =

Chinese human rights activist (1927–2022)

- 张思之
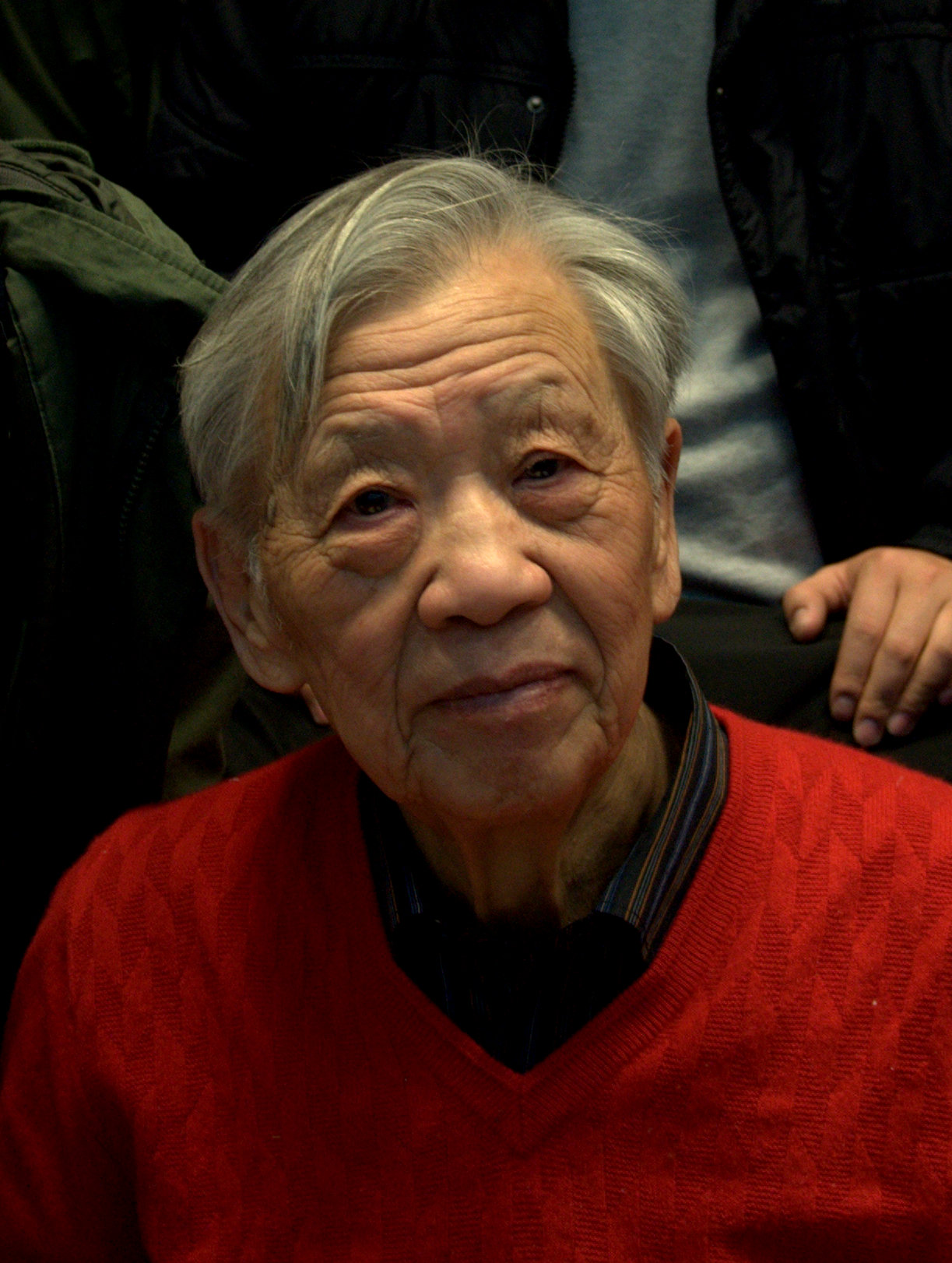
- Sizhi in 2013
- Born: 12 November 1927; Zhengzhou, Henan, China
- Died: 24 June 2022 (aged 94); Beijing, China
- Occupations: Legal scholar, lawyer
- Known for: Civil rights advocacy

Chinese name
- Traditional Chinese: 張思之
- Simplified Chinese: 张思之
Transcriptions
Standard Mandarin
- Hanyu Pinyin: Zhāng Sīzhī

Zhang Sizhi (Chinese: 张思之; pinyin: Zhāng Sīzhī; 12 November 1927 – 24 June 2022) was an active rights lawyer in China, and a professor at Central University of Finance and Economics. He was known as "The lawyer's conscience".

== Biography ==
Zhang was born as the eldest of 10 children to Zhang Jingtang and Meng Yanrong on 12 November 1927 in Zhengzhou. His father was a doctor who practiced Chinese traditional medicine. In 1944, at the age of 16, he joined the Chinese Expeditionary Force. Three years later, he was admitted to Chaoyang university. After graduating from university, he became a judge. In 1950, he graduated from the People's University of China. During the Anti-Rightist Movement, he was divided into right, was sentenced to 15 years in a village. In 1972, he was free to act as a teacher. In July 1979, Zhang returned as a lawyer and participated in the trials of "Lin Biao Anti-Revolutionary Group Case" and "Jiang Qing Anti-Revolutionary Group Case", commonly known as the "Two Cases", serving as defense lawyers for Jiang Qing and others. After the 1989 Tiananmen Square protests and massacre, he defended liberals such as Bao Tong, Wang Juntao, Gao Yu and Pu Zhiqiang, as well as rights lawyers.

On 24 June 2022, he died from cancer in Beijing, at the age of 94. He was cremated at the Babaoshan Revolutionary Cementary crematorium, known for the cremation of party and state leaders.

== Awards ==
- 2008 Petra Kelly Prize by Heinrich-Böll-Stiftung for his outstanding contributions to the protection of human rights and the construction of a legal state and lawyer system in China.

== See also ==
- Weiquan movement
