= Tokiwa University =

Coordinates: 36°22′54.5″N 140°26′21.8″E

- 常磐大学
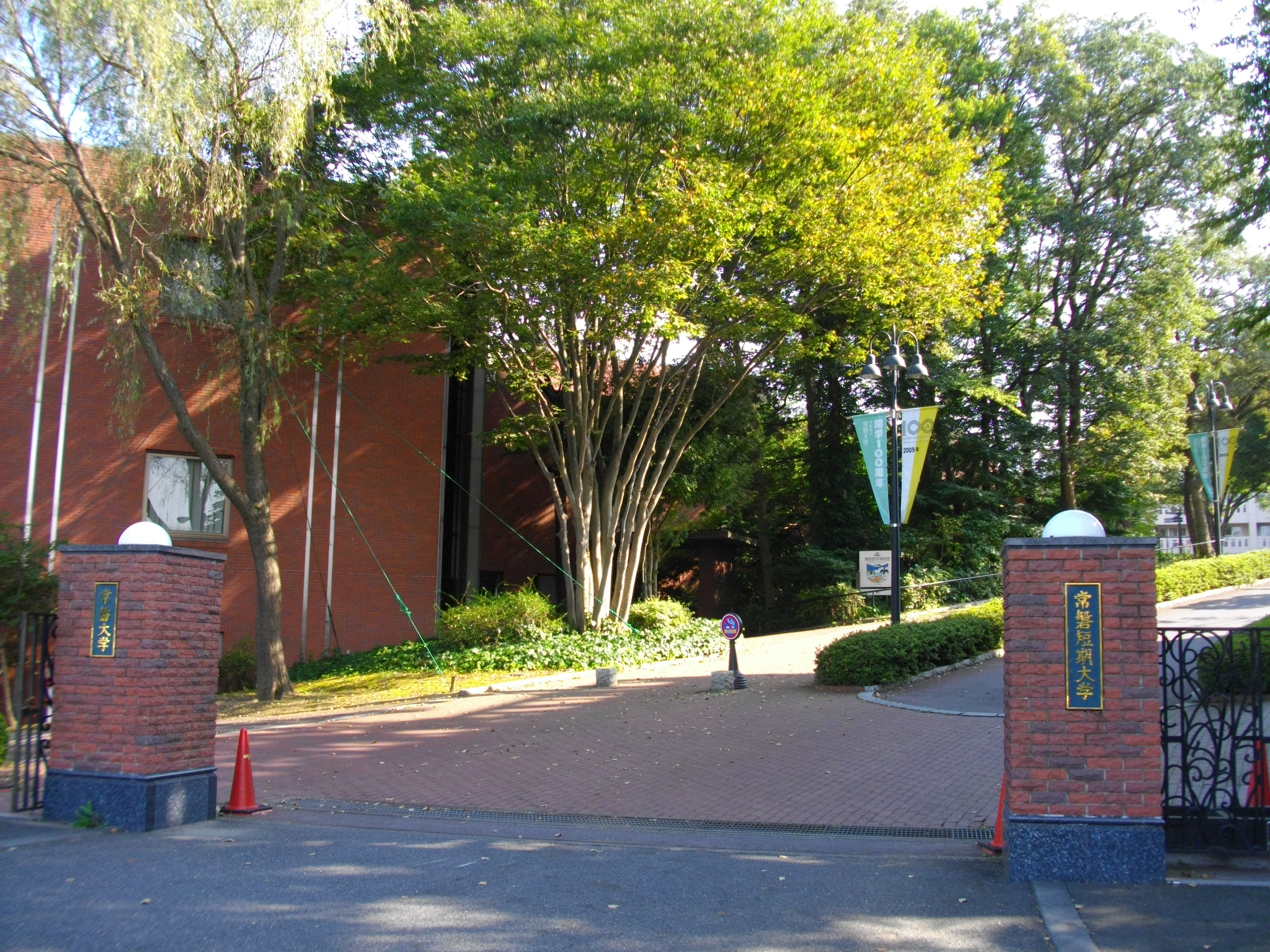
- Type: Private
- Established: 1909
- Location: Mito, Ibaraki, Japan
- Website: Official website

Tokiwa University (常磐大学, Tokiwa daigaku) is a private university in Mito, Ibaraki, Japan, established in 1983. The predecessor of the school was founded in 1909. California State University, Fresno & California State University, Northridge's Japanese Department has had an active international student exchange program with this university since 2004.

== Publications ==
The university publishes the journal International Perspectives in Victimology, ISSN 2156-6194.
