= Nomarussia Bonase =

South African human rights activist

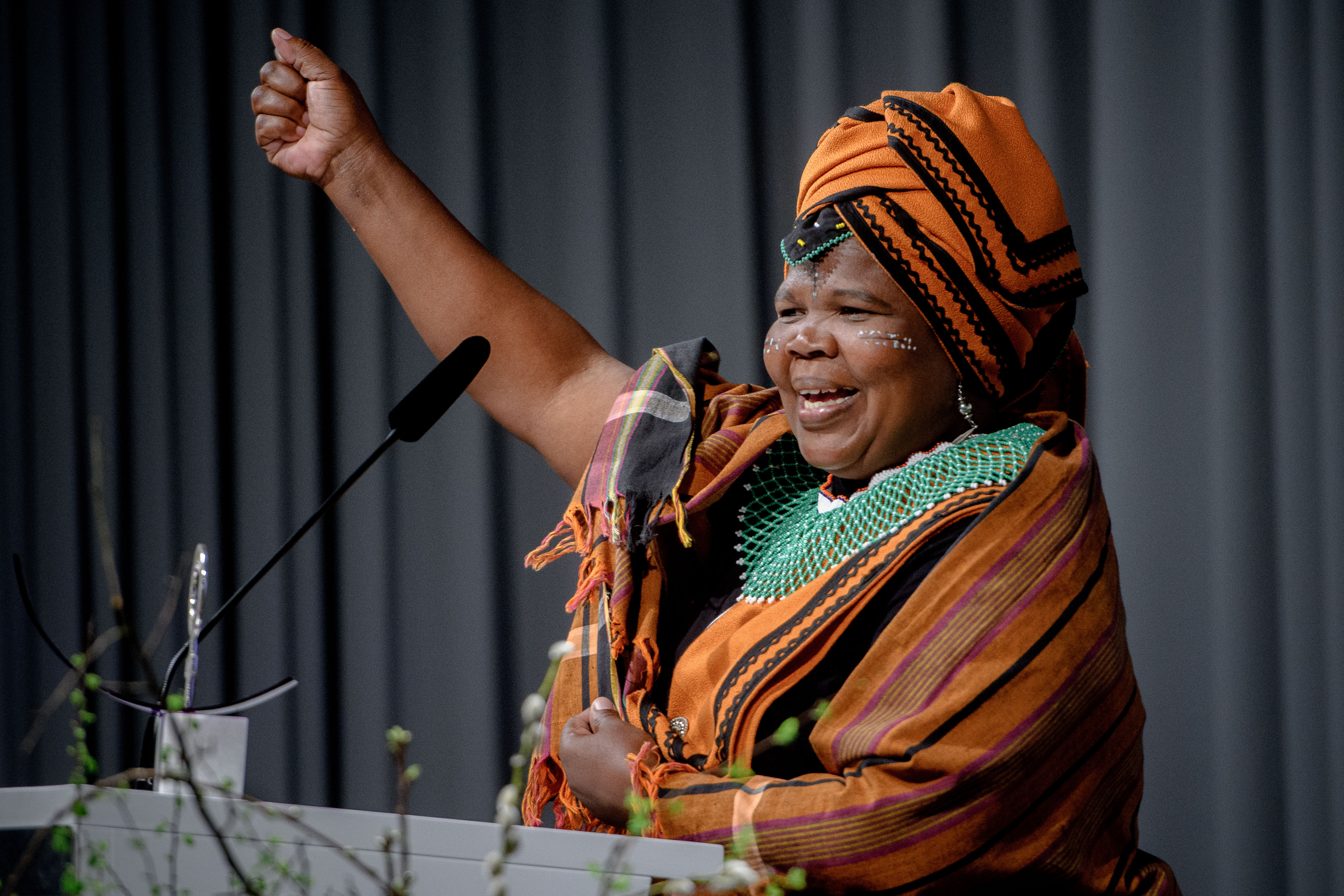
- Born: 1966 (age 59–60); South Africa

Nomarussia Bonase (born 1966) is a South African human rights activist.

== Biography ==
Nomarussia Bonase was born in 1966 in Baragwanath Hospital, South Africa. Bonase was a politically active schoolgirl but had no opportunity to go to university so she got a job working in a transport company in Johannesburg. There she organised the workers into a union, becoming their first shop steward. Bonase became concerned about the Truth and Reconciliation Commission when it did not deal with sexual violence. She joined the Khulumani Support Group and has become the National Coordinator. The group works to gain recognition and recompense for the victims and survivors of the apartheid regime in South Africa. Bonase has organised against racism on many fronts from the Marikana massacre to the lack of toilets available in a town. In 2017, she won the Anne Klein Women's prize.
