= Kristina Hänel =

German physician

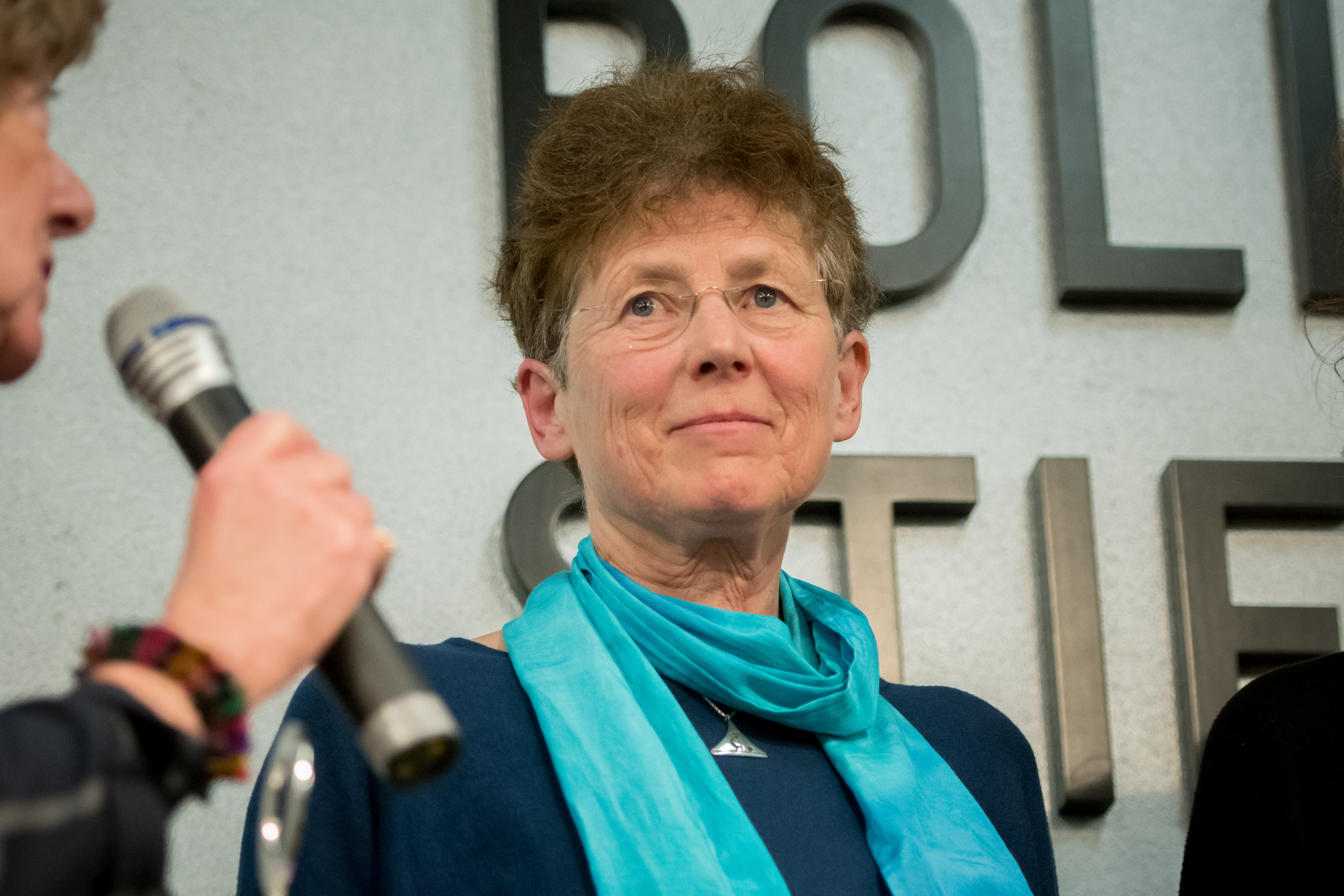
- Hänel in 2019
- Born: August 5, 1956 (age 70)
- Occupation: Physician
- Known for: Abortion activism

Kristina Gisela Hänel (born August 5, 1956) is a German general medicine and emergency physician. When practicing in Gießen, Hänel achieved national recognition because she was accused of advertising for the abortion of pregnancy and sentenced to a fine. She appealed, winning the appeal after a change in the Criminal Code made it possible for her to list abortions as a procedure she conducts on her website.

== Life and work ==
Hänel comes from a family of doctors. After graduating from high school at age 18, she began medical school. Hänel has been working as a certified physician and emergency physician in the rescue service since 1981. She completed advanced training in emergency medicine, anesthetics and sex therapy. Her first jobs after graduation were at Pro Familia centers and at Stimezo clinics in the Netherlands. Since 2001 she has owned her own practice in Giessen. Her main areas of research and mediation include topics such as women's health, sexuality, family planning, pregnancy, childbirth and abortion.

Hänel is a founding member of Wildwasser Gießen, an association against sexual abuse of girls and women. At the Justus Liebig University Gießen, she had a teaching assignment on sexual traumatization in childhood. She volunteers at the German Society for Sexual Research.

Hänel is married and gave birth to her children during her studies. She is a marathon runner and starts internationally for the age group national team of the German Triathlon Union.

== Awards ==
- 2018: Clara Zetkin Women's Prize of the party The Left
- 2019: Anne-Klein-Frauenpreis of the Heinrich Boll Foundation, jointly with Natascha Nicklaus and Nora Maria Szász
- 2019: "Frauenringsfrau 2019" of the German Frauenring e. V.
- 2019: Marburg beacon through the city of Marburg and the Humanist Union

== Books ==
- Andrea Vogelsang (pseudonym): The cave of the lioness. Stories of a doctor about abortion. Anthology, Ulrike Helmer publishing house, Sulzbach / Taunus 2018, around an afterword extended reprint of the first edition, ISBN 978-3-89741-417-4 .
- Kristina Hänel: The political is personal. Diary of an "abortion doctor". Argument Verlag, Hamburg 2019, ISBN 978-3-86754-513-6 .
