= Mor Çatı Foundation =

Turkish non-governmental organization

Mor Çatı's Logo

The Mor Çatı Foundation (Mor Çatı Kadın Sığınağı Vakfı) is a prominent Turkish non-governmental organization that works to combat gender-based violence and provide shelter and support services to women and children affected by domestic violence. The foundation is founded in Istanbul in 1990, Mor Çatı has been central to the feminist movement in Turkey, advocating for legal protections and public awareness of women's rights across the country.

== History ==
Mor Çatı was founded in Istanbul in 1990 by a group of feminist activists, including Nebahat Akkoç, in response to the severe lack of resources and institutional support for women experiencing domestic violence. Turkey had limited legal protections for women facing abuse, and societal awareness of gender-based violence was minimal. Inspired by the growing Turkish feminist movement of the late 1980s, Mor Çatı's goal was to create both a safe space for survivors and a platform for advancing gender equality in Turkey. Since its inception, Mor Çatı has remained focused on providing shelter to women and children, offering both immediate crisis supports and long-term rehabilitation services to survivors. The organization has overcome numerous challenges, including legal and societal pushback, to establish itself as a key player in the Turkish feminist movement and a pioneer in advocating for comprehensive women's rights.

== Help center ==
Those subjected to violence do not always know their legal rights and how to use them. These needs are met with the legal consultancy provided by volunteer lawyers. Women are informed about which laws they can benefit from when they are subjected to violence, what legal process they should follow. A common situation in law is that the positive provisions in existing laws cannot be implemented due to the non-female approach of the implementers. It important for legal consultants to have a female perspective.

== Shelters ==
Shelters house victims and their children. There they can receive the social, psychological, legal, support they may need to build an independent life of violence. Mor Çatı has three separate shelter projects and provided support to over 1000 women and children. The first of these was carried out between 1995 and 1998 being the first independent women's shelter in Istanbul. Mor Çatı has been continuing its independent shelter activities since March 2009 with the support it receives from organizations and sponsors such as municipalities and the European Commission.

== Workshops ==
Sharing the knowledge and experiences gained through solidarity with women, creating awareness, and promoting feminist methods in combating violence against women are Mor Çatı's main goals. Much of this happens through workshops. These workshops are given to public institutions such as bar associations and municipalities for sharing knowledge and experiences. The number of workshops held jointly with other women's options is close to 100.

== Key achievements ==
Mor Çatı has been an advocate for legal reforms, including Law No. 6284, which provides protection measures for women and children facing domestic violence. This law represents a significant advance in Turkish legislative history, a direct result of years of lobbying by Mor Çatı among other organizations. This law provides women with emergency shelter access, legal protection orders, and social services to help them escape situations of violence.

Additionally, Mor Çatı has been a vocal advocate of the Istanbul Convention, an international treaty aimed at preventing and combating violence against women. When Turkey withdrew from the convention in 2021, Mor Çatı launched a high-profile digital campaign opposing the decision and rallied public support across social media platforms. The campaign aimed to raise awareness and also encouraged Turkish citizens to advocate for the protection of women's rights.

Mor Çatı plays a role in the Turkish feminist movement, addressing immediate support and systemic issues that perpetuate violence against women. The foundation coordinates with other Turkish and international organizations, adding to both local and global feminist discourses and advocate for reform. Mor Çatı's engages in public education and policy advocacy to shape the country's understanding of gender-based violence. The foundation also conducts public campaigns and workshops, seeking to challenge societal norms that tolerate violence. Between 2002 and 2009 the murder rate of women skyrocketed by 1,400 percent. The foundation launched a campaign to raise awareness of violence toward women in a public way. They placed posters of women jumping for joy, their arms and legs splayed out beyond the frame's borders, all around Istanbul. The text next to the women reads, "I want to live in freedom."

== See also ==
- Women in Turkey
- Feminism
- Feminist movement
