= Robert Kharshiing =

Indian politician (1959–2022)

Shri Robert Kharshiing (7 January 1959 – 7 April 2022) was a politician from the Nationalist Congress Party and a member of the Parliament of India (MP) representing Meghalaya in the Rajya Sabha, the upper house of the Parliament.

He was MP during April 2002 to April 2008.

He died on 7 April 2022, at the age of 63.
