= Heinrich Böll Foundation =

German political foundation linked to the Green Party

Heinrich Böll Foundation Heinrich Böll-Stiftung
- Abbreviation: HBS
- Formation: 1997
- Type: Public policy think tank
- Location: Berlin, Germany
- Coordinates: 52.5238°N 13.3830°E
- Website: www.boell.de/en

The Heinrich Böll Foundation (German: Heinrich-Böll-Stiftung e.V.; Abbreviation: HBS) is a German legally independent political foundation. Affiliated with Alliance 90/The Greens, it was founded in 1997 when three predecessors merged. The foundation was named after German writer Heinrich Böll (1917–1985).

== Mission statement and structure ==
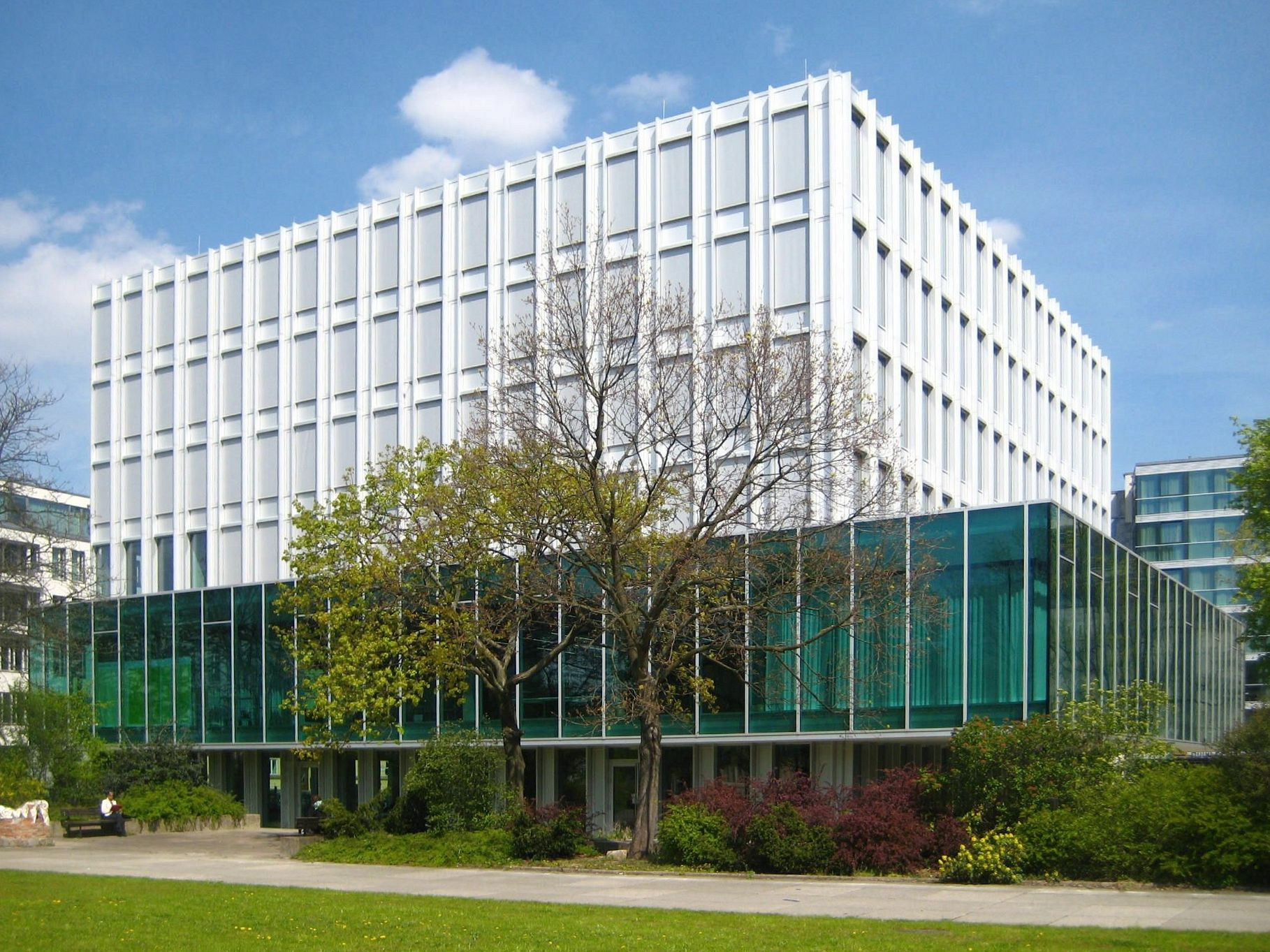
Headquarters of the Heinrich Böll Foundation in Berlin

The Heinrich Böll Foundation is part of the global Green political movement that has developed since the 1980s. It describes itself as an agency for green visions and projects, a think tank for policy reforms, and an international network. In its mission statement the foundation defines its aims as follows:

The Heinrich Böll Foundation is part of the Green political movement that has developed worldwide as a response to the traditional politics of socialism, liberalism, and conservatism. Our main tenets are ecology and sustainability, democracy and human rights, self-determination and justice. We place particular emphasis on gender democracy, meaning social emancipation and equal rights for women and men. We are also committed to equal rights for cultural and ethnic minorities and to the societal and political participation of immigrants. Finally, we promote non-violence and proactive peace policies.

With the approval of the Böll family and Alliance 90/The Greens, the foundation carries the name of the writer Heinrich Böll. According to its mission statement, Böll personified what the foundation stands for: The courage to stand up for one's beliefs; inspiring people to meddle in public affairs; and unconditional support of human dignity and human rights. Böll encouraged others to be politically active and get involved in political matters, famously stating: "Meddling is the only way to stay relevant."

The Heinrich Böll Foundation also has a scholarship programme for university and PhD students, as well as a research archive with a focus on new social movements, Green politics, and a special section for political activist Petra Kelly.

The foundation, with headquarters in Berlin, operates 30 offices on four continents and has branches in each of Germany's 16 states. Since 2002, Ralf Fücks and Barbara Unmüßig have led the executive board; Steffen Heizmann is the current CEO. In November 2016 Barbara Unmüßig was re-elected and Ellen Ueberschär was elected to succeed Ralf Fücks in July 2017. In 2022, Imme Scholz and Jan Philipp Albrecht were elected Presidents.

The German state subsidized the work of the foundation with 63 million Euros in 2018.

In addition, the association has been accused by both the Turkish government and some opposition circles, including some prominent intellectuals of trying to design Turkish politics.

== History ==
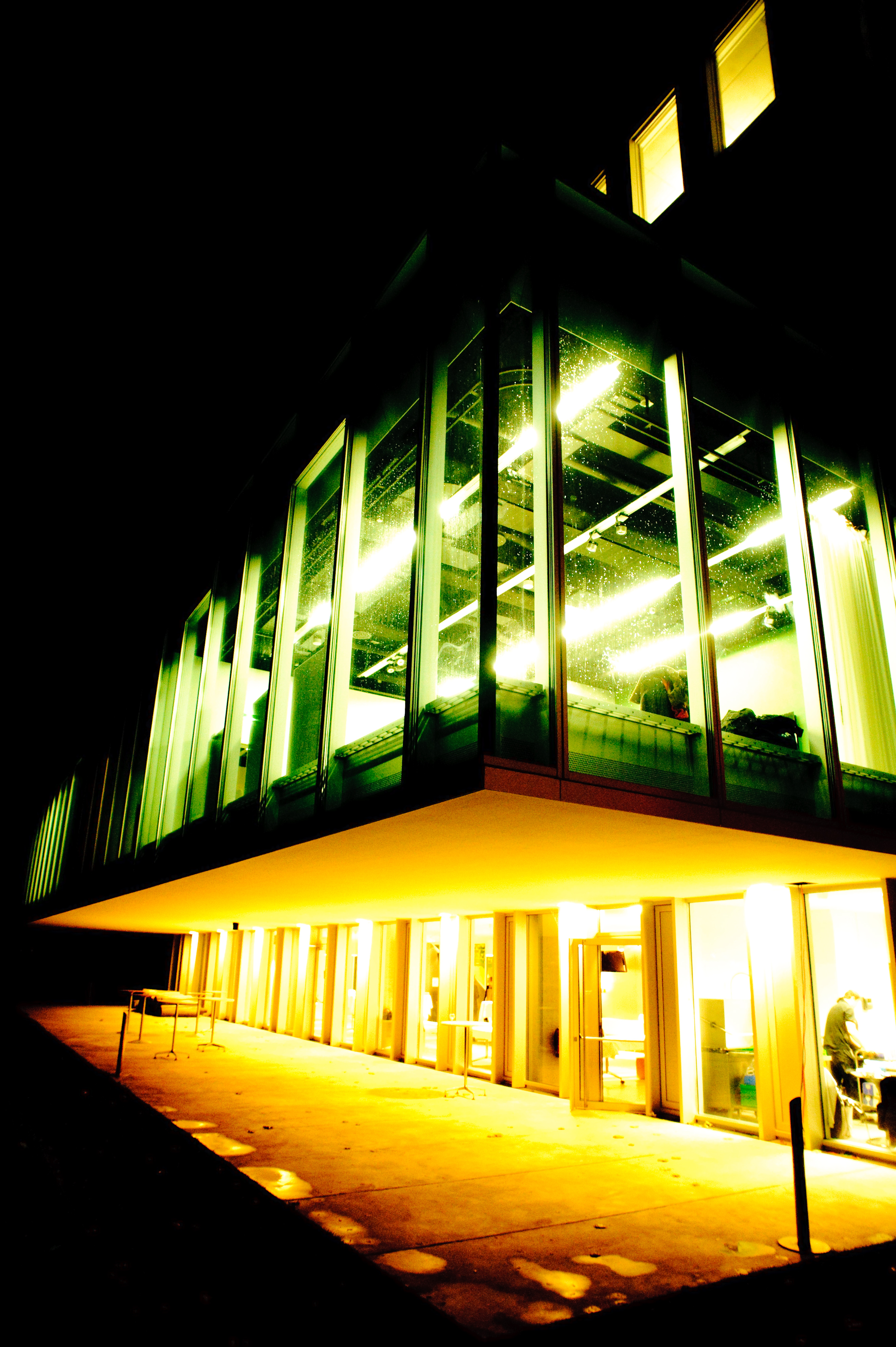
Heinrich Böll Foundation headquarters, entrance

In West Germany, state-level foundations affiliated to the Green Party were set up in the early 1980s. In 1983, an effort to create a national foundation came to nothing, yet later in the 1980s three different nationwide foundations were established, reflecting the different political strands within this rainbow coalition. They were the feminist Frauenanstiftung, the Buntstift federation of regional foundations, and the Cologne-based Heinrich Böll Foundation. Later, an umbrella organisation, Regenbogen, was created whose task it was to co-ordinate the activities of the three separate foundations. In 1988, the Green Party recognised Regenbogen as the foundation allied to the party thus making it eligible for government funding.

In March 1996, a Green Party convention demanded that the separate foundations become one and the motion was passed with a large majority. The statutes drafted for this new unified foundation defined gender democracy and issues related to migration and diversity as key fields of activity. After some further debate, the new foundation took the name of one of its predecessors – Heinrich Böll Foundation. On 1 July 1997, the newly founded Heinrich Böll Foundation began its operations at headquarters located in Berlin's Hackesche Höfe. In 2008 the foundation moved to its current headquarters in Berlin's government district. The new, energy-efficient building was designed by Zurich-based e2a eckert eckert architekten and its design inspired by two Mies van der Rohe projects, Farnsworth House and the Seagram Building.

In May 2022, the Heinrich Böll Foundation was declared an undesirable organization in Russia. Earlier that year, the Russian Ministry of Justice had delisted the foundation from the NGO affiliates registry.

In August 2023, the Heinrich Böll Foundation announced that Masha Gessen was the winner of the Hannah Arendt Prize for Political Thought. In December 2023, days before the award was due to be presented, the HBS said it was withdrawing its support because it objected to an essay by Gessen on the Gaza–Israel conflict, published in The New Yorker on 9 December.

== Fields of activity ==
The Heinrich Böll Foundation works on a range of issues, some long-term, some short-term. The following areas figure large in many of its projects and publications:

- Climate Change: The foundation focuses on the concept of Greenhouse Development Rights (GDRs), arguing that the impasse between the climate crisis on the one hand and development on the other has to be overcome by making the protection of "development dignity" part of the climate protection agenda. Recent publications in this field include the Coal Atlas that focuses on the environmental and health impacts of coal mining and use.
- Resource Policy: The foundation advocates a responsible use of resources and accordingly advises governments, political actors, and interest groups in Germany and abroad. An example for this is the memorandum Resource Politics for a Fair Future. In 2014, a widely reviewed publication titled The Meat Atlas presented a wide range of data demonstrating that the present amount of international meat consumption is unsustainable.
- European Policy: The foundation supports the democratic reform of European institutions and is committed to a further expansion of the European Union and the integration of new member states.
- Gender Policy and LGBTI Rights: From its very beginning, gender politics and gender democracy have been priorities for the foundation, and its organisational development, which is based on gender equity, has become a template for many other institutions. The foundation's work on LGBTI rights has garnered national as well as international attention.
- Scholarship Programmes: The foundation awards scholarships to outstanding students in Germany, be they German citizens, EU nationals, or from other parts of the world. It encourages the integration of non-German students into the programme. In addition, there are specific programmes for journalists, as well as sur-place-scholarship programmes in Russia, Armenia, Azerbaijan, and Georgia and in Central America and the Caribbean.

== Organisation ==
=== Headquarters and offices in Germany ===
The foundation's present headquarters (since 2008) in the centre of Berlin provide approximately 7,000 square metres of floor space with modern offices for ca. 185 employees. The conference centre seats up to 300 people in varying configurations, making it possible to hold large multi-day conferences.

The foundation claims that its headquarters are in the "ecological vanguard" of modern office and conference centre design. At 55.7 kWh/m^{2} the building's energy consumption is less than half the legal maximum. In partnership with Grammer Solar, a photovoltaic system has been installed on the roof. This has an annual energy yield of some 53,000 kWh and feeds into the district heating system. In addition, the building uses an adiabatic recooler to climatise its offices. Outlet slits run at sill level along the glazing in every office. The sill casing houses high-performance heat-exchangers, through which water at a temperature of 20 °C circulates in the summer. A small ventilator inside ensures that cooled air is distributed throughout the room. Even when the temperature outside is over 30 °C, the room temperature does not rise above 25°. This system uses approximately ten times less energy than a conventional air conditioning system. The building uses the heat created by the computer network servers to heat its rooms. In recognition of this innovative project that significantly improves the energy efficiency of IT systems the foundation was presented with the Green CIO Award. Lastly, the atrium and internal courtyard create natural convection currents that serve to ventilate the building all year long.

The Heinrich Böll Foundation has regional offices in each of Germany's 16 states. These regional offices, which are organised as independent, associated units, implement community and regional programmes to do with ecology, democracy, migration, and gender democracy. Such activities, however, are not limited to regional or national issues and some co-operation projects are international in scope. Although legally independent, all 16 offices are part of the foundation's overall structure and are bound by the statutes of the Heinrich Böll Foundation (e.g. they have to serve the public interest and have to meet the quota for female employees).

=== International offices ===
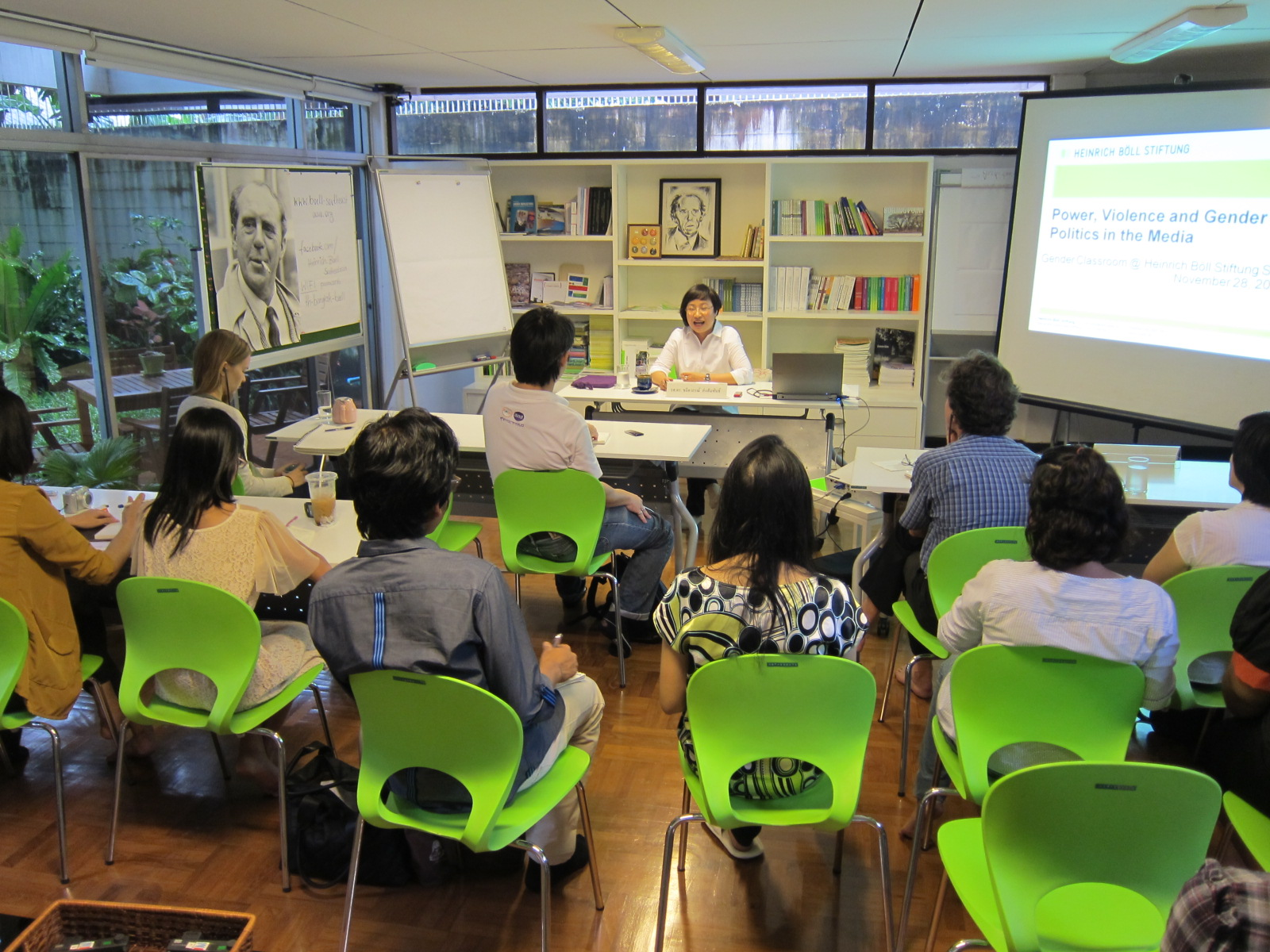
Seminar at the Heinrich Böll Foundation's Southeast Asia office in Bangkok, Thailand, November 2012

The Heinrich Böll Foundation currently operates 32 international offices. Projects overseen by individual offices are frequently not limited to the country where an office is located as many have regional responsibilities. Overall the foundation conducts and supports over 100 projects in 60+ countries.

Even before 1997, when the current Heinrich Böll Foundation was created, some of its predecessors operated international offices, which were then absorbed into the new foundation. The very first office was the one in Prague, which opened its doors in August 1990. The second one was, in 1993, the Pakistan office, followed in 1994 by Turkey and Cambodia, and by Russia, Nigeria, and the Central America office in El Salvador (all in 1995).

Over the course of the years, the only office that has been closed is the one in Ethiopia. According to the foundation it discontinued its activities there in 2012, as the conditions dictated by the Ethiopian government "in April 2012 confirmed that independent political work would not be possible (...) and the Heinrich Böll Foundation would remain extremely restricted in its activities. (...) Under these circumstances, the Ethiopian office of the Heinrich Böll Foundation cannot, in the foreseeable future, fulfil its mission of promoting democratisation, gender justice and sustainable development. (...) The closure of the Foundation's office in Ethiopia should therefore also be taken as a sign of protest against the ongoing restriction of human rights and democratic development in the country."

In early 2013, the head of the foundation's Afghanistan office was recalled for security reasons. Office activities continue however with the support of local staff.

International offices are, as a rule, headed by a German citizen posted to the country in question. They are supported by local staff and, in some cases, by additional German experts. Well-known office heads included Milan Horácek (Prague) and Kerstin Müller (Tel Aviv).

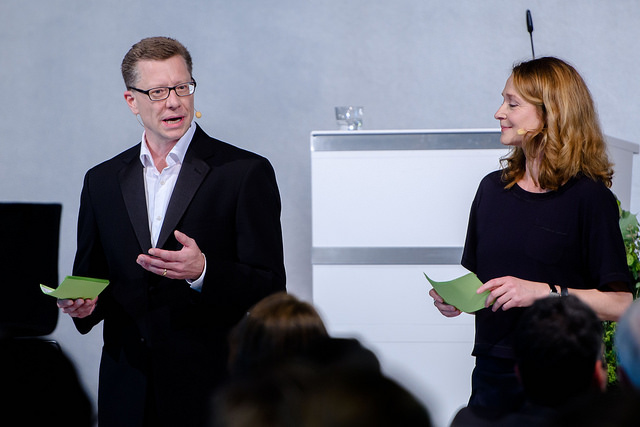
Bastian Hermisson, former Director of the Heinrich Böll Foundation North America, moderates an event with Annette Maennel, Head of the Communications Department in Berlin.

In 1998, the Heinrich Böll Foundation opened its office in Washington, D.C. The office focuses on five programme areas: climate & energy, foreign & security policy, democracy & society, economic governance & G20, and gender. Through organising events and inviting international visitors, the office promotes the exchange of ideas and concepts between North America and the rest of the world.

=== Scholarship programme ===
In addition to its political and cultural work, the Heinrich Böll Foundation also offers scholarships for university and PhD students. Scholarships are available for all academic disciplines, with around 1000 scholarships per year. The candidates selected are expected to achieve a high degree of academic excellence, serve their communities, be interested in politics and social issues, and support the ideals the foundation stands for.

In its Annual Report the foundation states:

In 2013, the Foundation's Scholarship Program selected 310 new fellows from a pool of 1,999 applicants. Last year, a total of 852 undergraduate and graduate students as well as 235 doctoral candidates received financial support (57% women, 43% men). 1,002 of these scholarships were financed by the Federal Ministry of Education and Research; of this group, 312 fellows (31%) had an immigrant background and 394 (39%) came from families with no academic background. In addition, funding from the Federal Foreign Office paid for scholarships for 85 international fellows; of this group, 22 fellows (26%) were from other European countries and 63 (74%) from non-European countries.

In addition to the scholarship programme for students at German universities, the Heinrich-Böll-Foundation also offers three sur-place-scholarship programmes for non-German undergraduate and postgraduate students in Russia, the Southern Caucasus region (Armenia, Azerbaijan and Georgia), and in Central America and the Caribbean. Funding for these programmes comes from the Ministry for Economic Cooperation and Development and the German Foreign Office.

=== Gunda Werner Institute ===
The Gunda Werner Institute for feminism and gender democracy was created in 2007 when the foundation's Feminist Institute and Joint Taskforce for Gender Democracy merged. The Institute focuses on women's rights as human rights, the politicisation of gender issues, the reflection of feminism and gender democratic approaches, and the discourse between science, politics, and civil society.

Through conferences and publications the institute's programmes address issues such as the nexus between human security and women's security; the evolving role of UN Resolution 1325 on "women, peace and security"; gender-political aspects of transitional justice in post-conflict societies; debates surrounding gender and science; and issues to do with sexual and reproductive rights.

=== Research archives ===
The Heinrich Böll Foundation operates two archives in Berlin, the Archiv Grünes Gedächtnis (Green Memory Archive) and the Petra Kelly Archive; in addition, it supports the Cologne-based Heinrich Böll Archive.

- Grünes Gedächtnis collects documents about the history of the German Green Party and the new social movements in Germany, including materials concerning West Germany's environmental, anti-nuclear, feminist, and peace movements after 1968, as well as East Germany's civil-rights movement. In addition to official documents of political parties and documents donated by activists or their estate, the archive has a substantial collection of campaign posters, photographs, web content, and voice and video recordings.
- The Petra Kelly Archive collects and preserves the political legacy of activist and politician Petra Kelly, including materials concerning international movements against nuclear weapons and for disarmament, peace, human rights, and emancipation.
- The Heinrich Böll Archive collects and documents everything to do with the life and works of German Nobel laureate in literature Heinrich Böll. In collaboration with the Historical Archive of the City of Cologne and members of the estate of Heinrich Böll it collects and indexes all works of Heinrich Böll as well as publications about him. Since 2002, the archive has been one of the co-editors of the critical edition of the works of Heinrich Böll.

=== GreenCampus ===
GreenCampus is the Heinrich Böll Foundation's academy for political training and continuing education. Founded in 2006, the academy offers training in political management and on diversity and gender issues for volunteers and political activists as well as professional organisers and politicians.

== Awards ==
The Heinrich Böll Foundation sponsors a number of awards, among them

- the Petra Kelly Prize (biannual)

The Petra Kelly Prize is awarded since 1998 to people and civil society organisations for their exceptional commitment to human rights, non-violent conflict resolution, and the environment. The prize is endowed with €10,000. Awardees include the Unrepresented Nations and Peoples Organization (UNPO), Ingrid Betancourt, Wangari Maathai, and Zhang Sizhi.

- the Hannah Arendt Award (annual)

Since 1995 the Hannah Arendt Award, named after Hannah Arendt, goes to individuals who uncover and analyse important, yet largely overlooked aspects of current political developments and who engage in public debate. The award is endowed with €10,000 and funded by the government of the state of Bremen and the Heinrich Böll Foundation Bremen. Awardees include Ágnes Heller, François Furet, Massimo Cacciari, Michael Ignatieff, Julia Kristeva, Tony Judt, Timothy D. Snyder, and Roger Berkowitz.

- the Peace Film Prize (each year as part of the Berlin Film Festival)

Since 1986 the Peace Film Prize is part of the Berlin Film Festival – and the only peace award that is part of one of the major film festivals. The price is endowed with €5000 and the awardee is also presented with a bronze created by Otmar Alt. Awardees include Marcel Ophüls for Hôtel Terminus: The Life and Times of Klaus Barbie, Michael Winterbottom for In This World, and Bille August for Goodbye Bafana.

- the Anne Klein Women's Award (annual)

The Anne Klein Women's Award was created in 2012 im memory of feminist lawyer and politician Anne Klein (1950–2011) and is funded thanks to a generous gift provided by Anne Klein in her will. The award goes to women whose outstanding commitment has helped make gender democracy a reality and who have fought against gender-based discrimination and anti-gay resentments. As an example, the 2017 Anne Klein's Women's Award went to South African activist Nomarussia Bonase who, with the Khulumani support group, is campaigning for reparations for over 100,000 victims of apartheid.

== Selected publications ==
=== Books ===
- Soil Atlas: Facts and figures about earth, land and fields. Published in 2015 in collaboration with the Institute for Advanced Sustainability Studies, the Soil Atlas traces the interrelations between our growing demand for food and the depletion of soils.
- Julie-Anne Richards, Keely Boom: Big Oil, Coal and Gas Producers Paying for their Climate Damage. This book, published in collaboration with the Climate Justice Programme (CJP) proposes a new way to finance climate change adaptation – a tax on fossil fuel extraction that will have to be paid by the top 90 polluters who are responsible for two-thirds of all carbon emissions.
- Ina Praetorius: The Care-Centered Economy. Rediscovering what has been taken for granted.
- The Meat Atlas is an annual report on meat consumption and the meat industry published in co-operation with BUND, Friends of the Earth and Le Monde diplomatique.

=== Series / magazines ===
- Perspectives Africa
- Perspectives Asia
- Perspectives Middle East
- Perspectives Southeastern Europe
- Perspectives Turkey

== See also ==
- Desiderius Erasmus Foundation (AfD)
- Friedrich Ebert Foundation (SPD)
- Friedrich Naumann Foundation for Freedom (FDP)
- Hanns Seidel Foundation (CSU)
- Konrad Adenauer Foundation (CDU)
- Rosa Luxemburg Foundation (Die Linke)
