= Harald Poelchau =

German prison priest and resistance fighter

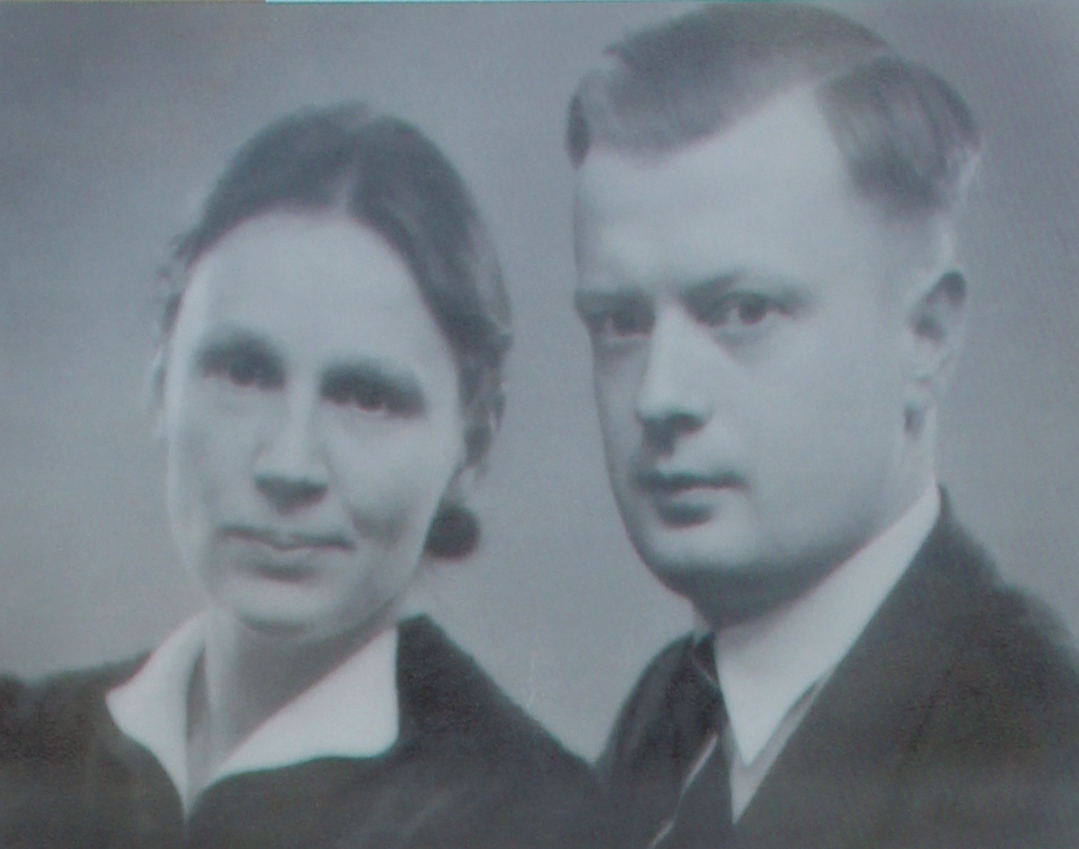
- Dorothee and Harald Poelchau

Personal life
- Born: Harald Poelchau; 5 October 1903 Potsdam, Germany
- Died: 29 April 1972 (aged 68) West Berlin, West Germany
- Parents: Harald Poelchau (father); Elisabeth Riem (mother)

Religious life
- Religion: Protestant

Harald Poelchau (5 October 1903 – 29 April 1972) was a German prison chaplain, religious socialist and member of the resistance against the Nazis. Poelchau grew up in Silesia. During the early 1920s, he studied Protestant theology at the University of Tübingen and the University of Marburg, followed by social work at the College of Political Science of Berlin. Poelchau gained a doctorate under Paul Tillich at Frankfurt University. In 1933, he became a prison chaplain in the Berlin prisons. With the coming of the Nazi regime in 1933, he became an anti-fascist. During the war, Poelchau and his wife Dorothee Poelchau helped victims of the Nazis, hiding them and helping them escape. At the same time, as a prison chaplain he gave comfort to the many people in prison and those sentenced to death. After the war, he became involved in the reform of prisons in East Germany. In 1971, Yad Vashem named Poelchau and his wife Righteous Among the Nations.

== Life ==
Poelchau was the son of Harald (1866–1938) and Elisabeth Poelchau (née Riem; 1871–1945) and was brought up in the Silesian village of Brauchitschdorf. His father was a Lutheran pastor in the village. Poelchau attended the Ritterakademie Gymnasium in Liegnitz, where he participated in Bible classes and became involved in the German Youth Movement (Jugendbewegung), which influenced him to turn away from a rural conservative piety.

At the University of Tübingen, Harald Poelchau met the librarian Dorothee Ziegele (1902–1977). The couple married on 12 April 1928, lived in Berlin and cultivated a large group of friends and acquaintances, that proved highly valuable after the handover of power to the Nazis. In 1938 the couple's son, also baptised Harald, was born, and in 1945 Harald's daughter Andrea Siemsen.

== Education ==
After graduating from the Ritterakademie Liegnitz in 1921, he studied Protestant theology at the Kirchliche Hochschule Bethel, at the University of Tübingen, and the University of Marburg from 1922. In Tübingen he was secretary of the youth organisation Köngener Bund. The Christian socialist philosopher Paul Tillich, who taught in Marburg in 1924, was the decisive, intellectual influence on him. Tillich became a lifelong friend and mentor. As a work student at Robert Bosch company in Stuttgart, he gained an insight into the world of workers and industry. After his first theological exam in 1927 in Breslau, he studied social welfare and state welfare policy at the German Academy for Politics in Berlin.

== Career ==
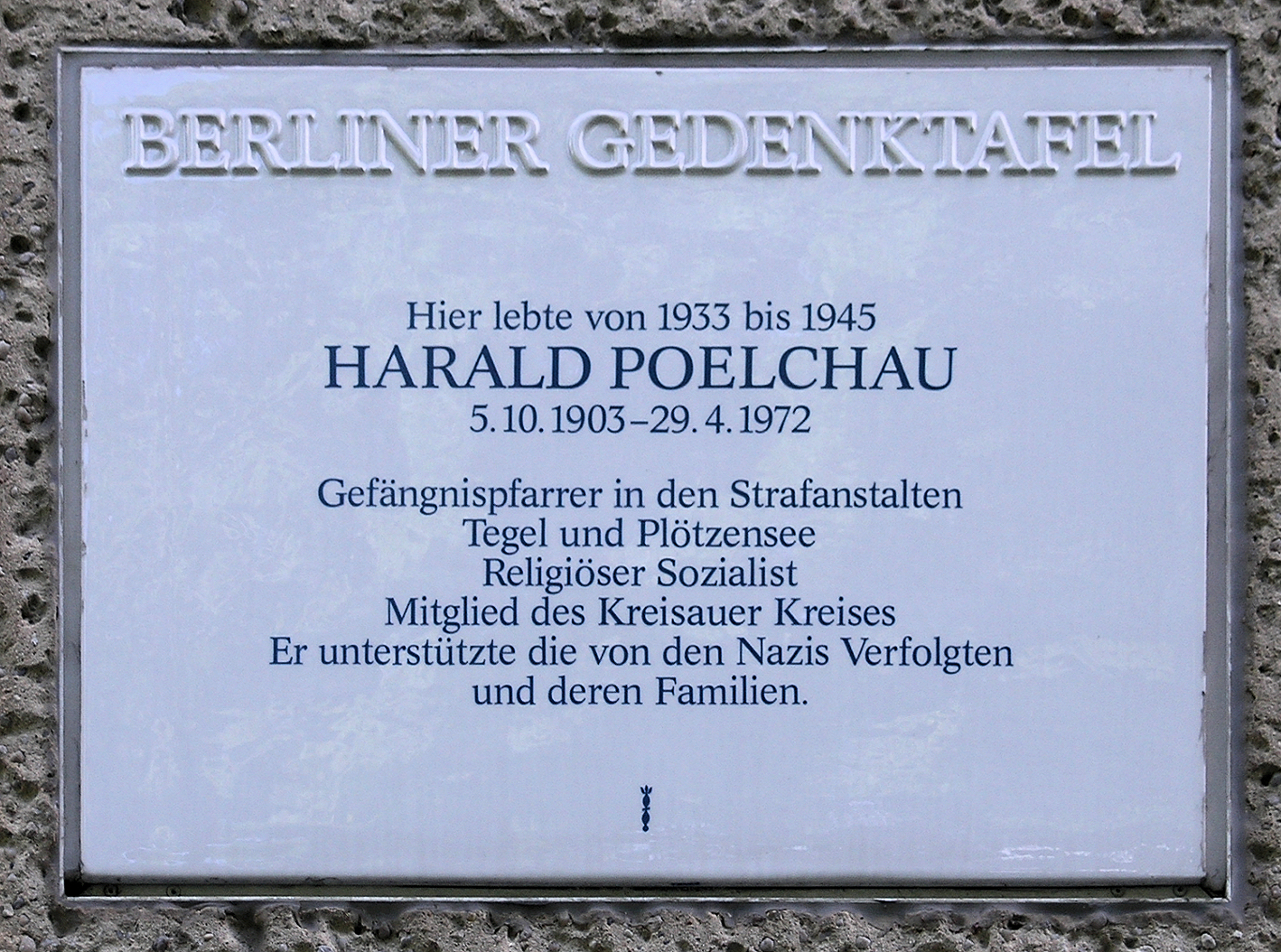
Berlin memorial plaque placed on 17 November 1988 in Wedding

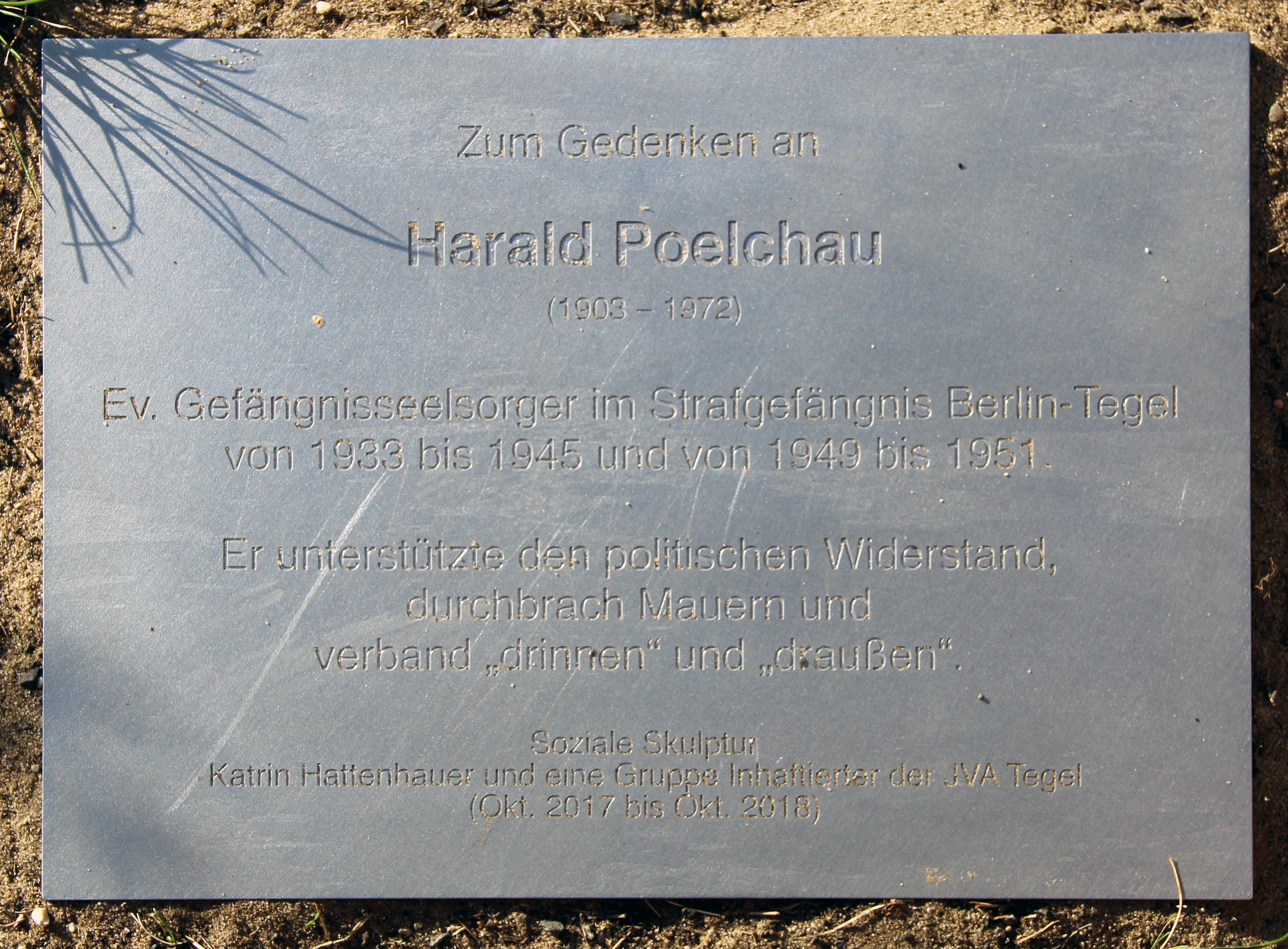
Memorial plaque at Tegel Prison in Berlin

Poelchau served as executive director of the German Association for Juvenile Courts and Juvenile Court Assistance in Berlin and as assistant to Paul Tillich at Frankfurt University. In 1931, he passed his second state exam in Berlin and wrote his doctoral thesis under Tillich titled: Die sozialphilosophischen Anschauungen der deutschen Wohlfahrtsgesetzgebung (The Social Philosophical Views of German Welfare Legislation). The paper was published in 1932 as a book titled Das Menschenbild des Fürsorgerechtes: Eine ethisch-soziologische Untersuchung (The Image of Man in the Law of Welfare: An Ethical-Sociological Investigation).

Poelchau applied for a position as prison chaplain at the end of 1932 and was instated on 1 April 1933 as the first clergyman in a prison appointed under the Nazi regime. As an official in the Justice Department he worked at Tegel Prison in Berlin as well as at several other prisons such as Plötzensee and Moabit. He was opposed to the Nazi's from the beginning, but did not join the Confessing Church (Bekennende Kirche).

== World War II ==
With the beginning of the World War II in 1939, death sentences against opposition members increased. Poelchau soon became an important source of support for the victims of Nazi persecution, and gave spiritual comfort to hundreds of people sentenced to death as they faced execution After the unsuccessful coup attempt of 20 July 1944, many of his close friends were sentenced to death. To help their families, he would smuggle letters and messages in and out of the prison cells.

In 1937, the first political prisoners began to appear that were members of the prohibited Communist Party. Poelchau cared for Robert Stamm and Adolf Rembte who were executed in November of that year, in Plötzensee.

In October 1941, the deportation of Jews from Germany began. Poelchau knew early on that only an escape into hiding would ensure survival. The refugees were supposed to call him at his office in Tegel and only talk if he answered with the code word "Tegel". But the actual conversation took place in his office, deep inside the prison walls. Supported by his wife, he arranged accommodations among his large group of acquaintances. These included Gertie Siemsen, a long-time friend from his student days, Willi Kranz, canteen manager in the Tegel and Plötzensee prisons and his partner Auguste Leißner, Hermann Sietmann and Otto Horstmeier, two former political prisoners, the couple Hildegard and Hans Reinhold Schneider who worked in social welfare and taught school (they were the parents of [Gesine Schwan] who later became a political scientist). They also included Agnes Wendland, a pastor's wife (who were also named Righteous Among the Nations for hiding Jews), and her daughter Ruth Wendland, the prison doctor Hilde Westrick, and the physicist Carl Friedrich Weiss and his wife Hildegard.

In 1942, the Soviet led Red Orchestra espionage network was uncovered by the Abwehr in Germany, France and the Low Countries and many of its members were imprisoned and executed. Poelchau provided support for Arvid and his American wife Mildred Harnack, John Rittmeister, Harro and Libertas Schulze-Boysen, Kurt and Elisabeth Schumacher, Walter Husemann, Adam Kuckhoff, and many others.

Only a few of those rescued or helped by the Poelchaus are known by name. One Jewish family, Manfred and Margarete Latte with their son Konrad, fled from Breslau after they learned they were to be deported, to Berlin where they went into hiding. Through a family friend, Ursula Teichmann, they made contact with Poelchau in late February 1943 and turned to him for help. He provided them with ration cards, cash and found accommodation for the family. He also found work for Manfred Latte, who became an ice delivery helper, and later gardener. As Konrad Latte was of a typical age to be conscripted Poelchau filled in a registration card for the Volkssturm, a national militia that was independent of the German army, to provide a cover ID.

Konrad Latte, established contact between Poelchau and Ruth Andreas-Friedrich, the co-founder of the resistance group Onkel Emil, along with the conductor Leo Borchard. The resistance group was motivated more by humanitarian concerns, rather than ideology and was made up on middle-class professionals. They began to work with Poelchau, who could arrange accommodations, forged identity papers, and food ration stamps. The Gestapo apprehended the Latte family in October 1943. Manfred and Margarete Latte were immediately deported to the Auschwitz concentration camp. Konrad Latte managed to escape the Große Hamburger Straße deportation center and went back into hiding.

Rita Neumann had been in hiding with the resistance fighter and Protestant pastor's wife Agnes Wendland since August 1943. Her brother Ralph Neumann joined Wendland. The siblings worked as bicycle couriers for Poelchau. In February 1945, they were arrested along with Wendland. The siblings managed to escape the Große Hamburger Straße deportation collection camp and make their way back to Poelchau's door. Other people Poelchau helped were Ilse Schwarz and her daughter Evelyne, a young stenographer Ursula Reuber, Anna Drach, Edith Bruck, Charlotte Paech, part of the Baum group and Charlotte Bischoff.

From 1941, Poelchau belonged to a resistance group of people around Helmuth James Graf von Moltke known as the Kreisau Circle. He took part in the first meeting of the group. After the attempted coup of 20 July 1944, the prison chaplain cared for many of those involved in the assassination. Harald Poelchau's extensive resistance involvement remained undiscovered until the end of the war.

== After the war ==
In 1945, he co-founded the Aid Organisation of the Protestant Churches (Hilfswerk der Evangelischen Kirchen) in Stuttgart, together with the theologian and resistance fighter Eugen Gerstenmaier and became its General Secretary. The Aid Organisation took care of the problems of refugees, the construction of apartments (settlement work) and homes for the aged and apprentices, and emergency churches. After returning to Berlin in 1946, Poelchau became involved in reforming the prison system in the Soviet occupation zone as councillor of the Central Administration of Justice. This was connected with a teaching assignment for criminology and prison science at the Humboldt University of Berlin. Together with Ottomar Geschke and Heinrich Grüber he sat on the central board of the Association of Political Prisoners and Persecutees of the Nazi System (Vereinigung der Verfolgten des Naziregimes – Bund der Antifaschistinnen und Antifaschisten). When Poelchau was unable to push through his ideas for prison reform in the east, he resigned his position. From 1949 to 1951, he was again appointed as the prison chaplain at Tegel Prison. In 1951, Bishop Otto Dibelius appointed him as the first social and industrial pastor of the Protestant Church in Berlin-Brandenburg (Industrie- und Sozialpfarramt) with the mission to connect the church to the industrial workers. Harald Poelchau dedicated himself to this task until his death in 1972. He is buried in the Zehlendorf cemetery in Berlin.

== Awards and honours ==
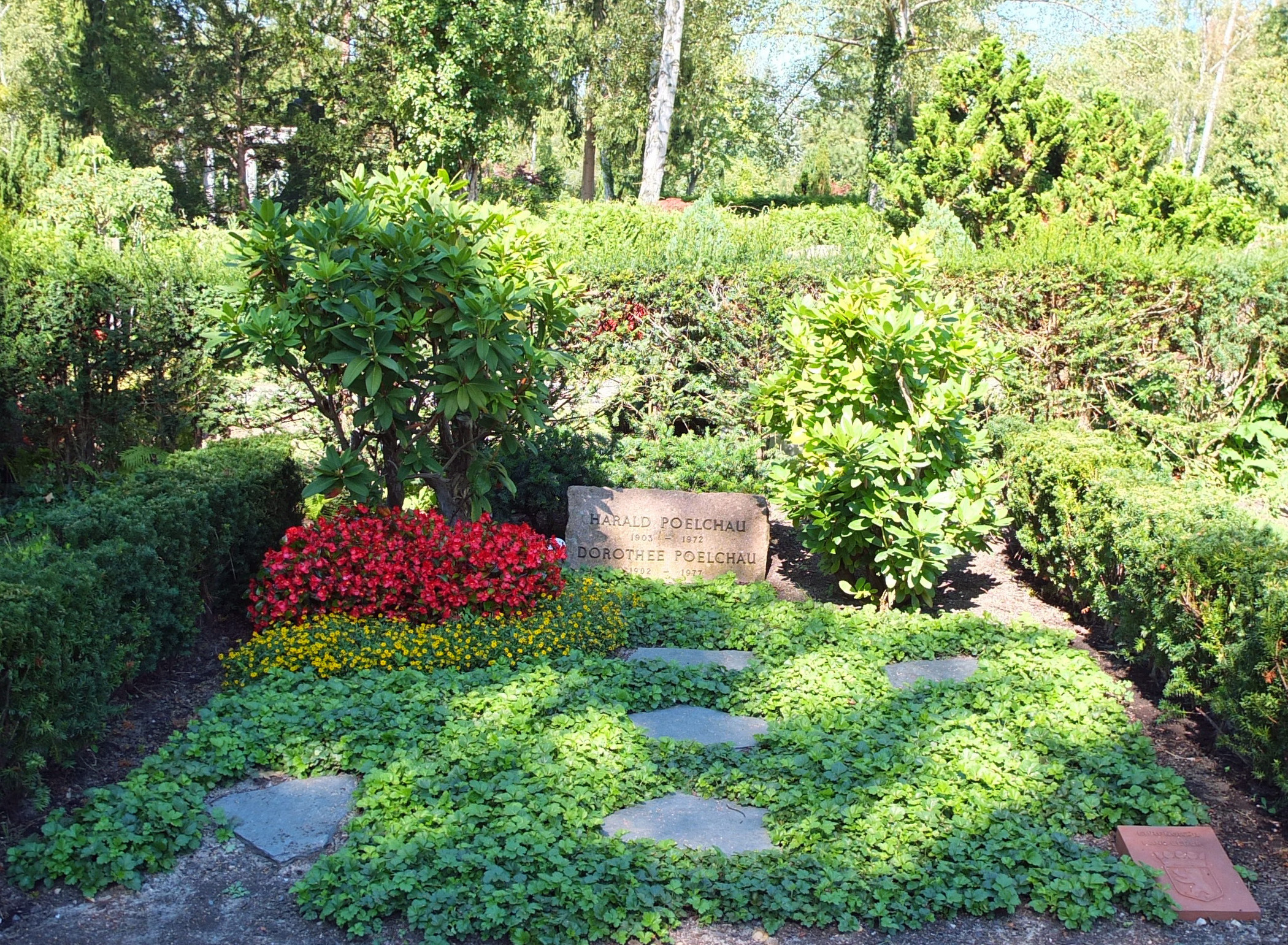
Gravesite at the Zehlendorf Cemetery

- On 30 November 1971, Harald and Dorothee Poelchau were recognised by the Yad Vashem memorial as Righteous Among the Nations.
- In 1973, an elite sports school bearing the Poelchau name, the Poelchau-Oberschule was opened in the Charlottenburg-Nord district of Berlin.
- By resolution of the Senate of Berlin on 6 October 1987, the couples burial place at the Zehlendorf cemetery was converted into an honorary grave of the State of Berlin.
- On 17 November 1988, a Berlin memorial plaque was affixed to the house at Afrikanische Straße 140b in Wedding in Berlin, where the couple lived from 1933 to 1946.
- On 31 January 1992, Karl-Maron-Straße in the Marzahn district of Berlin, was given the name Poelchaustraße, as was the Berlin S-Bahn station named after the street.
- On 29 April 1992, an asteroid discovered by Freimut Börngen at the Karl Schwarzschild Observatory was named Poelchau (10348) in honour of the couple.
- On 18 September 2017, a memorial stele for Harald and Dorothee Poelchau was dedicated at the corner of Poelchaustraße, Märkische Allee in the Marzahn district of Berlin.
- On 5 October 2018, a memorial created by the artist Katrin Hattenhauer and the inmates of Tegel Prison on the prison walls, was inaugurated for Harald Poelchau.

== Bibliography ==
- Poelchau, Harald (1932). Das Menschenbild des Fürsorgerechts. Eine ethisch-soziologische Untersuchung. Potsdam: Alfred Protte.
- Poelchau, Harald (1949). Die letzten Stunden: Erinnerungen eines Gefängnispfarrers. Berlin: Volk u. Welt. ISBN 9783353000965. OCLC 74854117.
- Poelchau, Harald (2004). Die Ordnung der Bedrängten – Erinnerungen des Gefängnisseelsorgers und Sozialpfarrers (1903-1972). Teetz: Hentrich & Hentrich. ISBN 3-933471-50-8. OCLC 54825307.
