= Poelchau =

Poelchau is a surname. Notable people with the surname include:

- Dorothee Poelchau (1902–1977), German librarian and resistance fighter
- Georg Poelchau (1773–1836), German singer
- Harald Poelchau (1903–1972), German prison chaplain, religious socialist, and resistance fighter

== See also ==
- 10348 Poelchau, a minor planet
