= Titania-Palast =

Historic cinema in Berlin, Germany

Titania-Palast Cineplex Titania
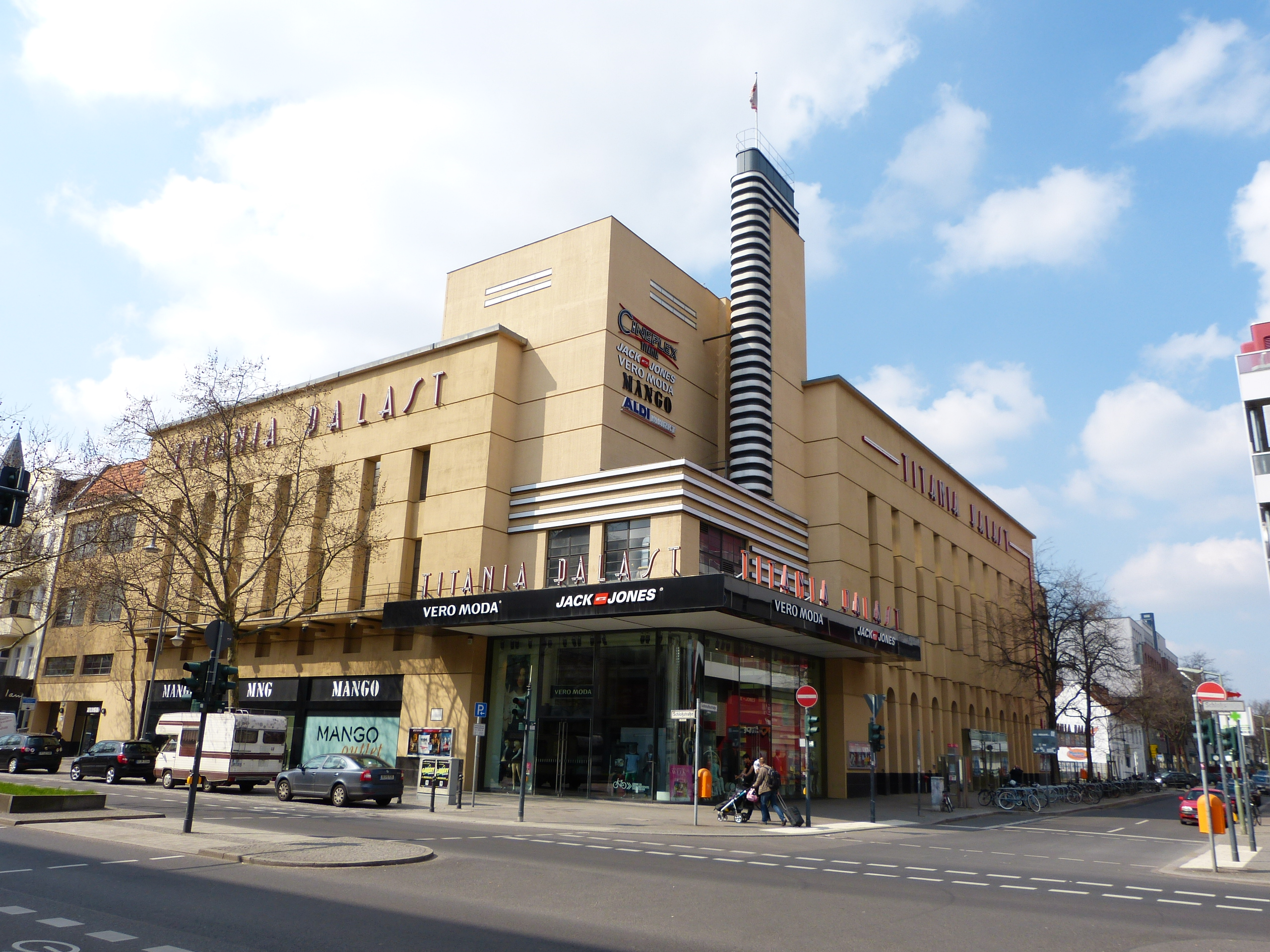
- The building in 2012
- Interactive map of the Titania-Palast; Cineplex Titania area

General information
- Architectural style: Art Deco; New Objectivity
- Location: Berlin, Schlosstrasse 5-6, Berlin 12163, Germany
- Coordinates: 52°27′50.04″N 13°19′36.12″E
- Opened: 1928
- Renovated: 1995

Website
- www.cineplex.de/berlin-titania/

The Titania-Palast is a cinema in Steglitz, in Berlin, Germany. Built in 1928, it is notable for its Art Deco style. It closed in 1965, and re-opened in 1995 as a multiplex, renamed the Cineplex Titania. It is a heritage site (Kulturdenkmal) of Berlin.

== History ==
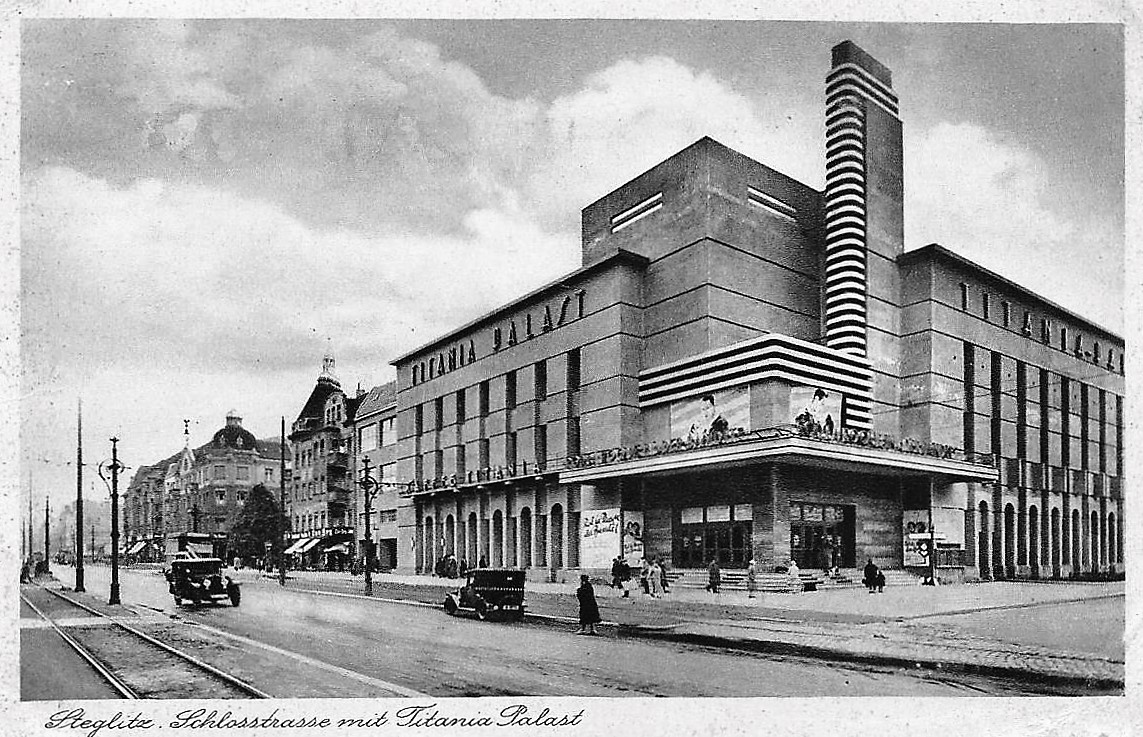
Titania-Palast in 1928

The Titania-Palast was designed by Ernst Schöffler, Carlo Schlönbach and Carl Jacobi, in the New Objectivity style, featuring a 30 metres (98 ft) "light tower", and a large Art Deco foyer. It was both a cinema and a theatre, seating 1,924, with space for an orchestra of up to 60 musicians. There was also a café seating 350. It opened on 26 January 1928. The first film shown was the silent film The Story of a Little Parisian, starring Carmen Boni. The first sound film shown was The Singing Fool starring Al Jolson, shown on 29 October 1929. The first German-language sound film shown, on 21 November 1929, was The Royal Box, starring Alexander Moissi.

The Titania-Palast survived WWII relatively undamaged. The Berlin Philharmonic, conducted by Leo Borchard, gave its first postwar concert there, on 26 May 1945, and in December 1948 the founding ceremony of the Free University of Berlin took place. Performers including Josephine Baker (in 1950), Marlene Dietrich (in 1960), Louis Armstrong, Maurice Chevalier and Yehudi Menuhin appeared at the Titania-Palast.

The cinema closed in December 1965. In 1966, parts of the building were leased by retail shops. In 1995, the building was completely renovated and re-opened as the Cineplex Titania, with five screens and 505 seats. After later renovation, there were seven screens and 1,223 seats.
