= Monday demonstrations in East Germany =

Periodic protests occurred between 1989 and 1991

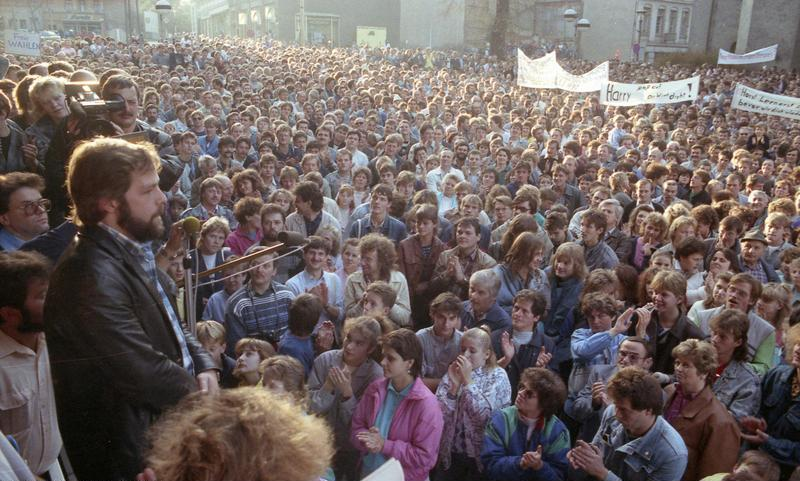
The Monday demonstrations helped to bring down the Berlin Wall.

The Monday demonstrations (German: Montagsdemonstrationen in der DDR) were a series of peaceful political protests against the government of the German Democratic Republic (GDR). The demonstrations began in Leipzig on 4 September 1989, starting the Peaceful Revolution in the GDR: the fall of the Berlin Wall, the collapse of the government, and German reunification.

The demonstrations took place in towns and cities around the GDR on various days of the week from 1989 to 1991. The Leipzig demonstrations, which are the best known, took place on Mondays. The protests are conventionally separated into five cycles.

== Overview ==
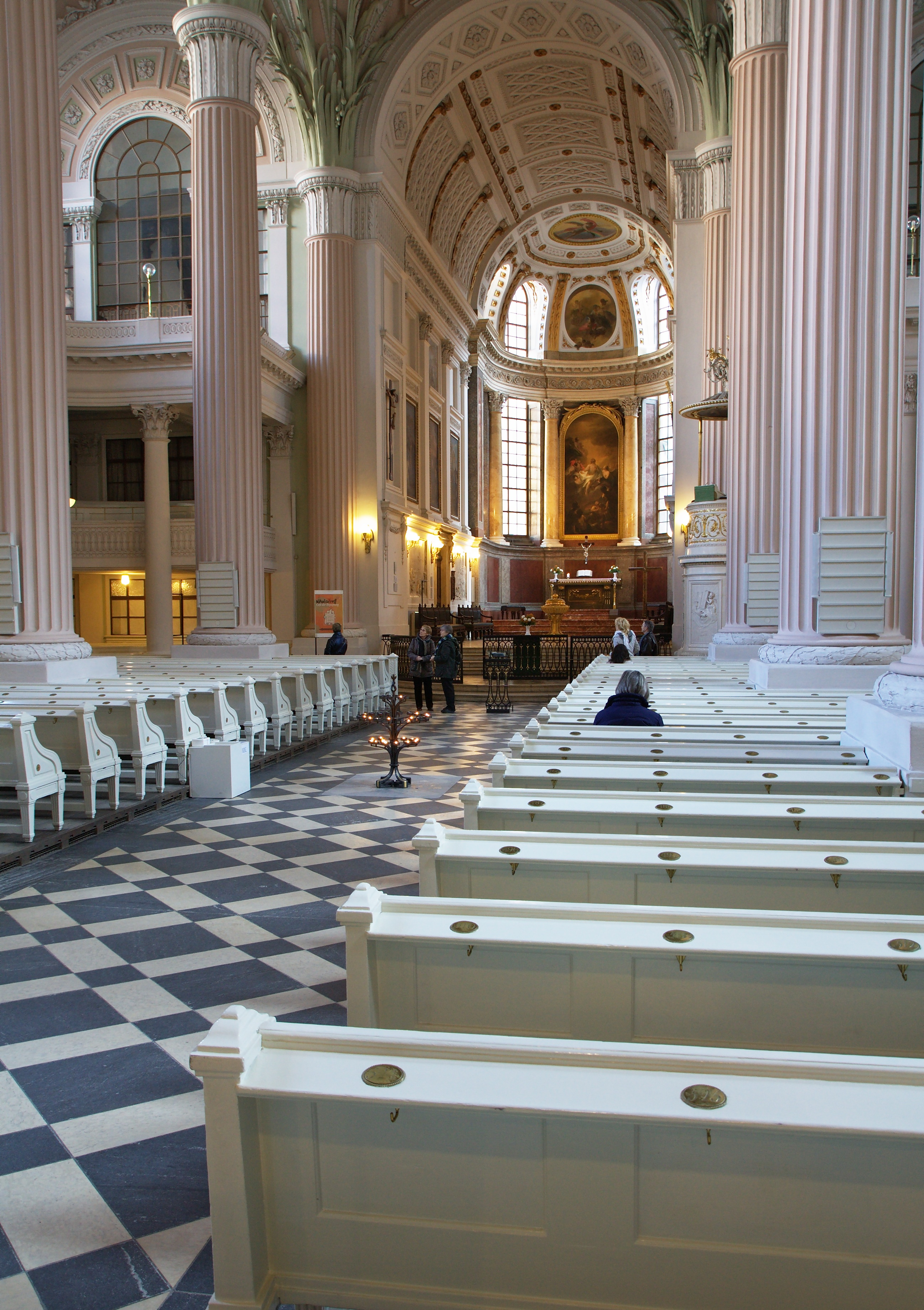
Interior of the St. Nicholas Church

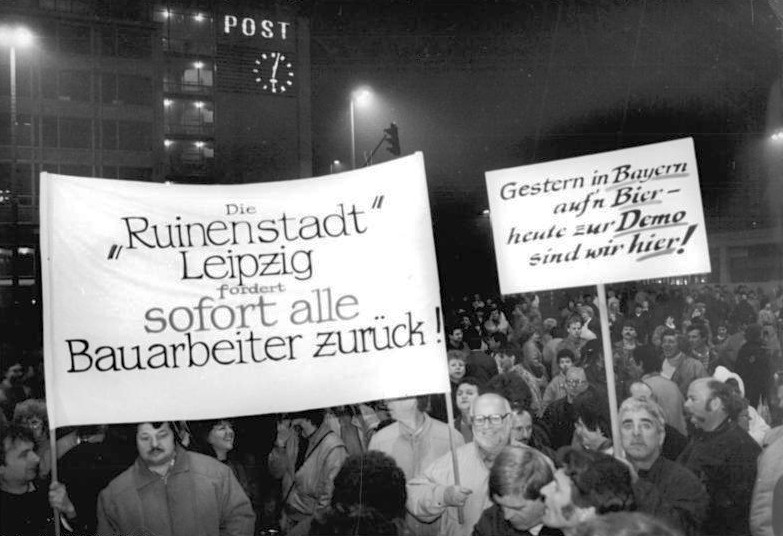
Demonstrators with banners. This demonstration took place after the fall of the wall.

Despite the policy of state atheism in East Germany, the demonstrations grew out of prayers for peace held in St. Nicholas Church in Leipzig from 1982 onward. The prayer meetings began on September 20, 1982 by pastor Günter Johannsen, continued in 1986 by pastor Christoph Wonneberger, and then continued on October 30, 1989 by pastor Christian Führer.

On 4 September 1989, after the prayers, the first demonstration happened in the square of the church. It was organized by Katrin Hattenhauer and Gesine Oltmanns. Both women had prepared four banners, had smuggled them into the church circumventing their surveillants from the Stasi, and on exiting the church had unfolded their banner that called for 'Für ein offenes Land mit freien Menschen' (For an Open Country with Free People), while more activists followed them with the other banners.

The demonstrations grew in size, despite authorities barricading the streets leading to the church. Eventually they filled the nearby Karl Marx Square (today known again as Augustusplatz). Safe in the knowledge that the Lutheran Church supported their resistance, many dissatisfied East German citizens gathered in front of the church, and non-violent demonstrations began in order to demand rights such as the freedom to travel to foreign countries and to elect a democratic government. The location of the demonstration contributed to the success of the protests. The secret police issued death threats and even attacked some of the marchers, but the crowd still continued to gather.

Informed by West German television and friends about the events, people in other East German cities began replicating the Leipzig demonstrations, meeting at city squares in the evenings. A major turning point was precipitated by the events in the West German Embassy of Prague at the time. Thousands of East Germans had fled there in September, living in poor conditions. Hans-Dietrich Genscher had negotiated an agreement that allowed them to travel to the West, using trains that had to first pass through the GDR. Genscher's speech from the balcony was interrupted by a very emotional reaction to his announcement. When the trains passed Dresden's central station in early October, police had to stop people from trying to jump on.

Protests around the 40th anniversary celebrations of the GDR on 7 October were met with a forceful response by the state. Despite the increased foreign attention around this date, there were around 500 arrests throughout East Germany.

Following these celebrations, attention turned to Leipzig on Monday 9 October. Seeing it as decision day, the State amassed 8000 police and armed military units with the intent of preventing any demonstrations. Fears of a massacre similar to that of China's Tiananmen Square Massacre grew as rumours circulated about hospitals stocking extra blood transfusions. A message recorded by six prominent citizens was broadcast throughout the city, urging both sides to remain calm and strive for peaceful dialogue. Initiated by the respected conductor Kurt Masur the group also included local members of the communist party.

Expectations and preparations of the state were greatly exceeded as more than 40,000 protesters (out of the city's population of 500,000) assembled. The most famous chant became "Wir sind das Volk!" (lit. 'We are the people!'), reminding the leaders of the GDR that a democratic republic has to be ruled by the people, not by an undemocratic party claiming to represent them. Protesters remained completely peaceful as they reached the Stasi Headquarters, avoiding any escalation of the delicate situation.

Although some demonstrators were arrested, the threat of large-scale intervention by security forces never materialised as local leaders (SED party leader Helmut Hackenberg and Generalmajor Gerhard Straßenburg of the armed police), without precise orders from East Berlin and surprised by the unexpectedly high number of citizens, shied away from causing a possible massacre, ordering the retreat of their forces. Later, Egon Krenz claimed it was he who gave the order not to intervene.

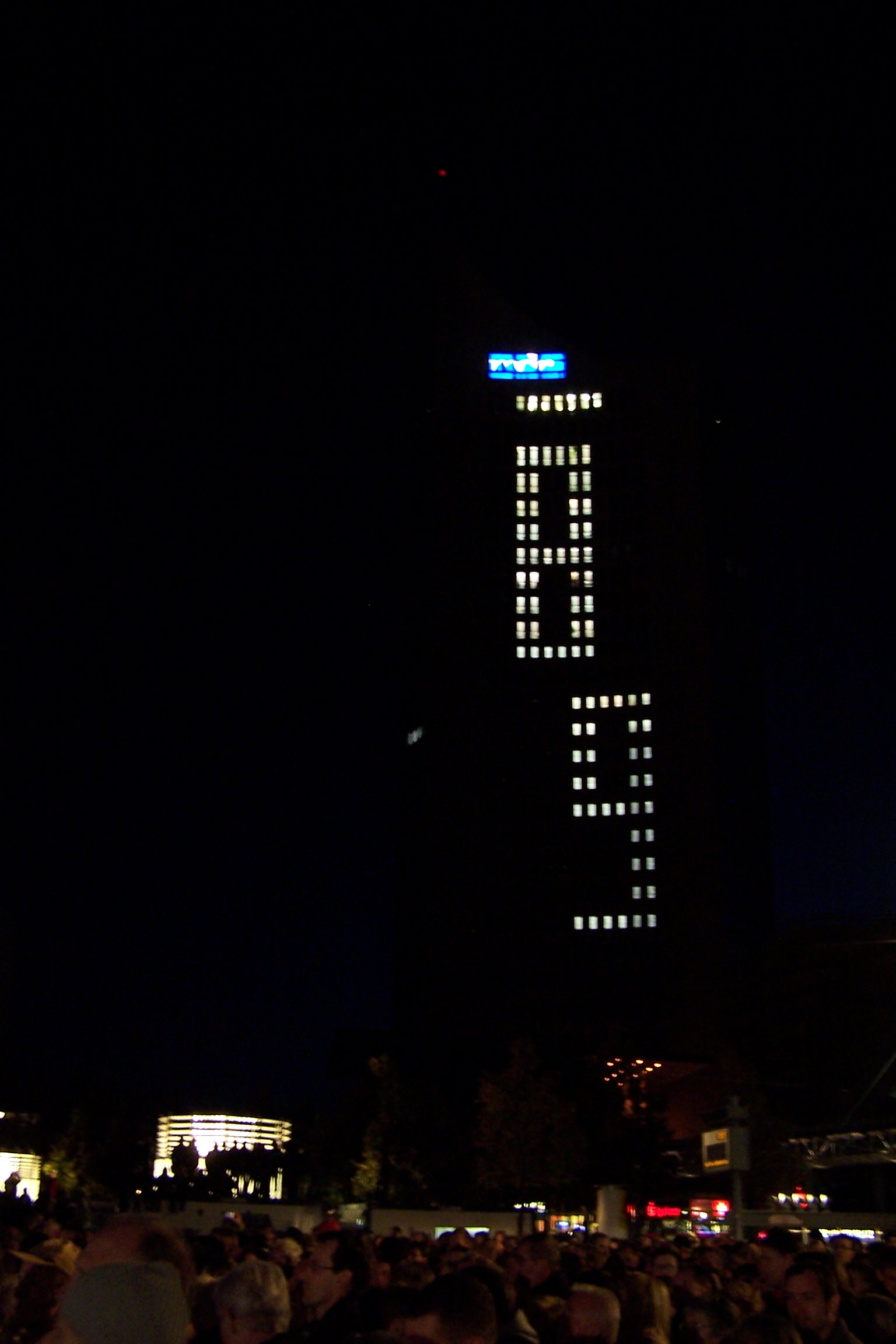
Installation on the City Hochhaus for Festival of Lights 2009

9 October is often seen as the "beginning of the end" of the GDR and one of the early signs of the state bowing to pressure. Since 2009 the date is commemorated and celebrated with the Festival of Lights drawing up to 200,000 people tracing the steps of the protest. Attendees include dignitaries like Kurt Masur, Hans-Dietrich Genscher, Joachim Gauck as well as Hungarian, Polish, Slovak, Czech heads of state.

On 9 October 1989, the police and army units were given permission to use force against those assembled, but this did not deter the church service and march from taking place along the inner city ring road, which gathered 70,000 people.

The next week, in Leipzig on 16 October 1989, 120,000 demonstrators turned up, with military units again being held on stand-by in the vicinity. (Two days after the rally, Erich Honecker, the leader of the SED, was forced to resign.) The week after, the number more than doubled to 320,000. Many of those people started to cross into East Berlin, without a shot being fired. This pressure and other key events eventually led to the fall of the Berlin Wall on 9 November 1989, marking the imminent end of the socialist GDR regime.

The demonstrations eventually ended in March 1990, around the time of the first free multi-party elections for the Volkskammer parliament across the entire GDR. This paved the way to German reunification.

== Cycles of the Monday demonstrations in Leipzig ==
1. 25 September – 18 December 1989: Thirteen protests
2. 8 January – 12 March 1990: Ten protests
3. 10 September – 22 October 1990: Seven protests
4. 21 January – 18 February 1991: Five protests
5. 4 March – 22 April 1991: Seven protests

== Role of the church ==
During the rule of the GDR, the Church tried to retain its own autonomy and continue organizing, though the practice of religion was generally suppressed in keeping with the Marxist-Leninist doctrine of state atheism. During this period, the Church acted on their ideology of "work against injustice and oppression." As a result, the church offered sanctuary to alternative political groups, the victims of the GDR rule. The church also offered them financial aid, support from the congregation and a place to communicate.

Initially, the church did not make statements about the GDR or anything politically related. However, by the middle of 1989 there was a "politicization of the church." Politics started to appear in the sermon of the preachers. More and more people started to gather in the churches. This helped spread information about the injustices that were occurring in the state. The gathering of people after the peace prayers, and the spread of information, spurred the formation of spontaneous demonstrations.

== See also ==
- Uprising of 1953 in East Germany
- Alexanderplatz demonstration
- Revolutions of 1989
- Peaceful Revolution
- History of the German Democratic Republic

== Literature ==
- Wolfgang Schneider et al. (Hrsg.): Leipziger Demontagebuch. Demo – Montag – Tagebuch – Demontage, Leipzig/Weimar: Gustav Kiepenheuer 1990
- Norbert Heber: Keine Gewalt! Der friedliche Weg zur Demokratie – eine Chronologie in Bildern, Berlin: Verbum 1990
- Jetzt oder nie – Demokratie. Leipziger Herbst 1989, Leipzig: C. Bertelsmann Verlag 1989
- Ekkehard Kuhn: Der Tag der Entscheidung. Leipzig, 9. Oktober 1989, Berlin: Ullstein 1992
- Karl Czok: Nikolaikirche – offen für alle. Eine Gemeinde im Zentrum der Wende, Leipzig: Evangelische Verlagsanstalt 1999
- Tobias Hollitzer: Der friedliche Verlauf des 9. Oktober 1989 in Leipzig – Kapitulation oder Reformbereitschaft? Vorgeschichte, Verlauf und Nachwirkung, in: Günther Heydemann, Gunther Mai und Werner Müller (Hrsg.) Revolution und Transformation in der DDR 1989/90, Berlin: Duncker & Humblot 1999, S. 247–288
- Martin Jankowski: "Rabet oder Das Verschwinden einer Himmelsrichtung". Roman. München: via verbis, 1999, ISBN 3-933902-03-7
- Thomas Küttler, Jean Curt Röder (Hrsg.): "Die Wende in Plauen", Plauen: Vogtländischer Heimatverlag Neupert Plauen 1991
- Martin Jankowski: Der Tag, der Deutschland veränderte – 9. Oktober 1989. Evangelische Verlagsanstalt, Leipzig 2007, ISBN 978-3-374-02506-0
- Schmemann, Serge (December 19, 1989). "Upheaval in the East; Leipzig Marchers Tiptoe Around Reunification". The New York Times.
