= Thomas Rung =

German serial killer (born 1961)

- Born: 3 January 1961 (age 65); West Berlin, West Germany
- Other name: "Pinocchio"
- Conviction: Murder
- Penalty: Life imprisonment

Details
- Victims: 7
- Span of crimes: 1983–1995
- Country: Germany
- State: Berlin
- Date apprehended: 28 February 1995

Thomas "Pinocchio" Rung (born 3 January 1961) is a German serial killer, who is considered to be the most dangerous of his kind since the end of the Second World War.

== Life ==
Rung was born on 3 January 1961, as the sixth of seven children. His father drank heavily and reigned with much violence and severity, while his mother left the family when he was two years old. The stepmother, Aunt Hilde, "sat on a throne, she was the judge" and ordered punishments that the father performed. The household lacked love, warmth and care. Rung attended a special school and was observed committing burglaries and assaults during his schooling. Before being arrested for murder in 1995, Rung was imprisoned many times for various crimes.

Between 1983 and 1995 he killed a total of six women and his stepbrother in cold blood. His victims were raped, strangled, drowned or suffocated and then robbed. Due to the different methods and without the availability of DNA profiling for a long time, no connection could be made between the crimes. Two of the victims - his 77-year-old landlady and a 22-year-old student - were murdered in 1983 in the Silbersteinstraße in Neukölln. For Rung's first murder, 23-year-old Michael Mager briefly confessed to the police, was falsely sentenced in 1984 and imprisoned for six years.

Rung was arrested in 1995 and quickly confessed. A year later, the Landgericht Berlin sentenced him to life imprisonment followed by two years of preventative detention. The forensic psychiatrist Wilfried Rasch rated him in his report as someone who "committed his actions despite his normality."

In 2001, he tortured a prisoner at Tegel Prison and was sentenced by the Berlin court to an additional two years and eight months in prison. In 2003 Rung once again injured a prisoner - this time lethally - the district court of Berlin sentenced him to 10 more years and second preventative detention for attempted manslaughter in 2004. Rung was first detained in Berlin-Moabit, because Tegel Prison refused to take him in again, and was then transferred to JVA Celle in Lower Saxony.

== Literature ==
- Peter Niggl: I am a monster. The confessions of Thomas Rung. Das Neue Berlin, 1999. ISBN 978-3-360-00889-3.
- Stephen Harbort: The Hannibal Syndrome. Serial murder phenomenon. Militzke, Leipzig 2001. ISBN 3-86189-209-X.

== See also ==
- List of German serial killers
