= Tegel Prison =

Prison in Berlin, Germany

Tegel Prison Justizvollzugsanstalt Tegel (JVA Tegel)
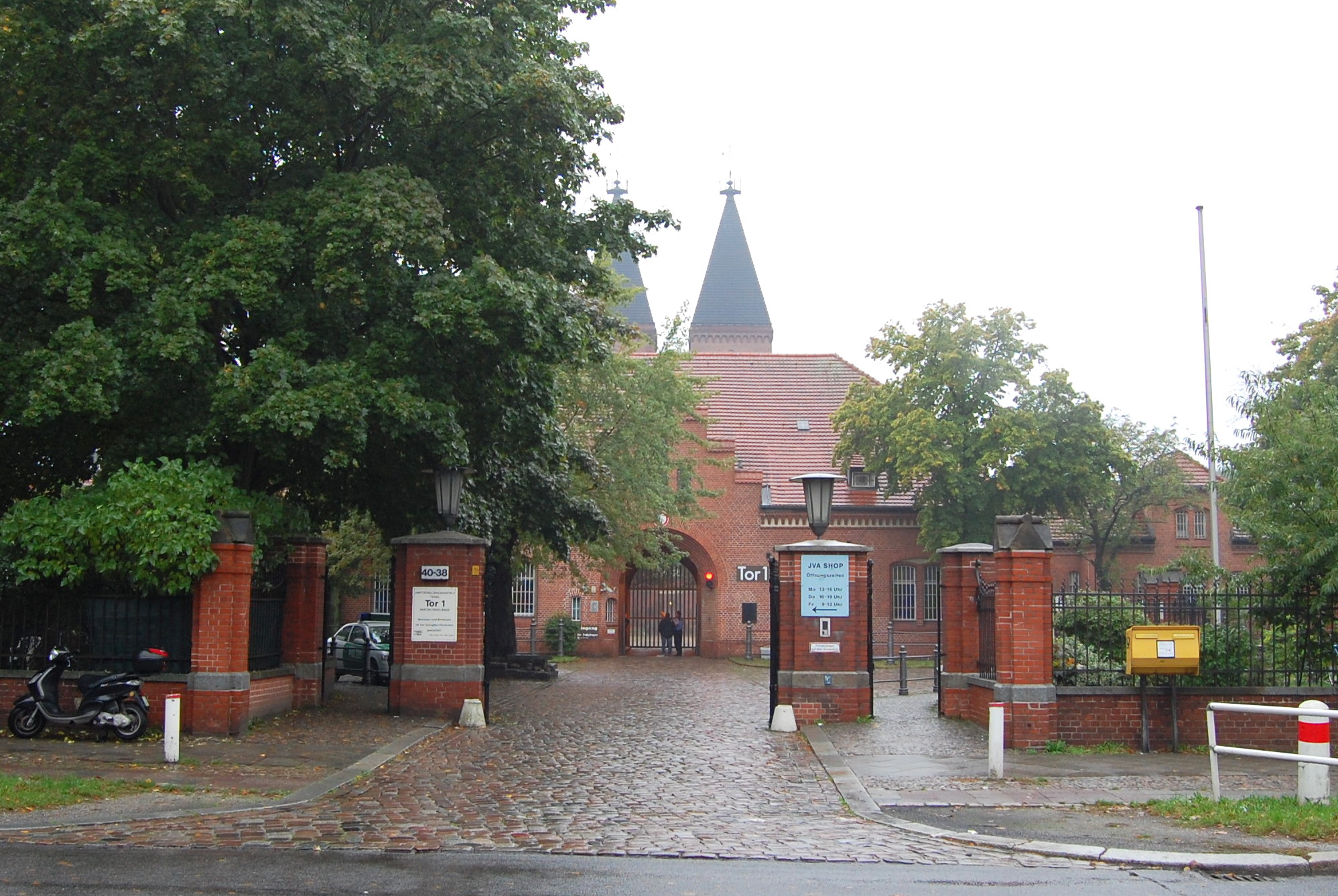
- The main entrance to the prison
- Interactive map of Tegel Prison; Justizvollzugsanstalt Tegel (JVA Tegel)
- Location: Reinickendorf, Berlin, Germany; 52.573056°N 13.293333°E
- Status: Operational
- Capacity: 1530 (In 2001)
- Population: 867 (in September 2021)
- Opened: 1898
- Director: Martin Riemer

Tegel Prison is a closed prison in the borough of Reinickendorf in the north of the German state of Berlin. The prison is one of the largest prisons in Germany.

== Structure and numbers ==
As of 2021, Tegel Prison is divided into five sub-prisons, including the facility for the execution of preventive detention. Since 30 January 2021, Tegel Prison has had an open detention area for preventive detention. The grounds of the prison cover 131,805 m^{2}, the outer wall is 1,465 m long and it has 13 watchtowers. As of November 2021, the prison had 630 staff.

In January 2021, Tegel had 867 prison places and about 630 staff. The average occupancy rate in 2020 was 704 inmates, of whom about 46% were foreigners. All sentence durations are represented, from short sentences to life sentences and preventive detention.

== History ==
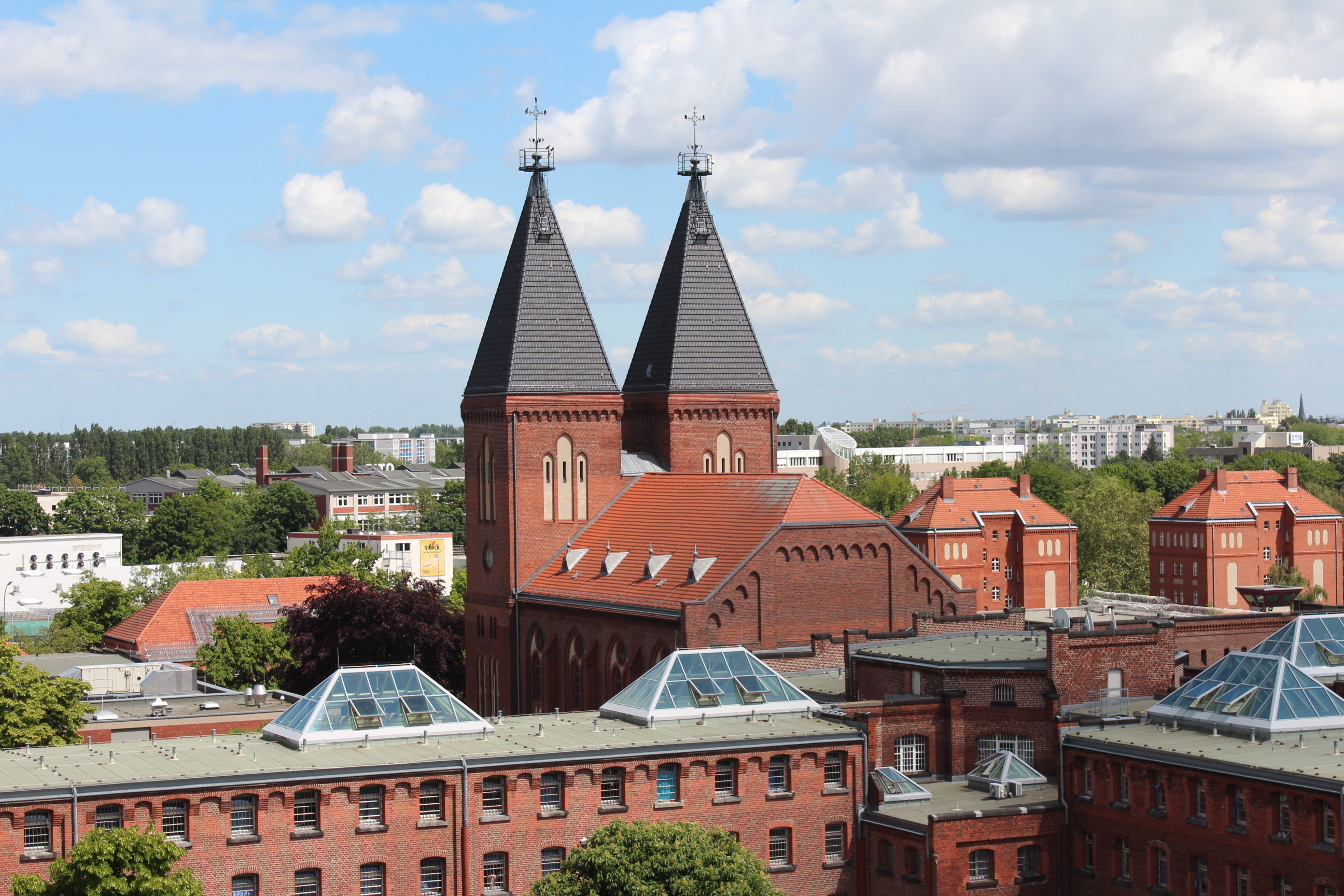
Penitentiary II and the institutional church

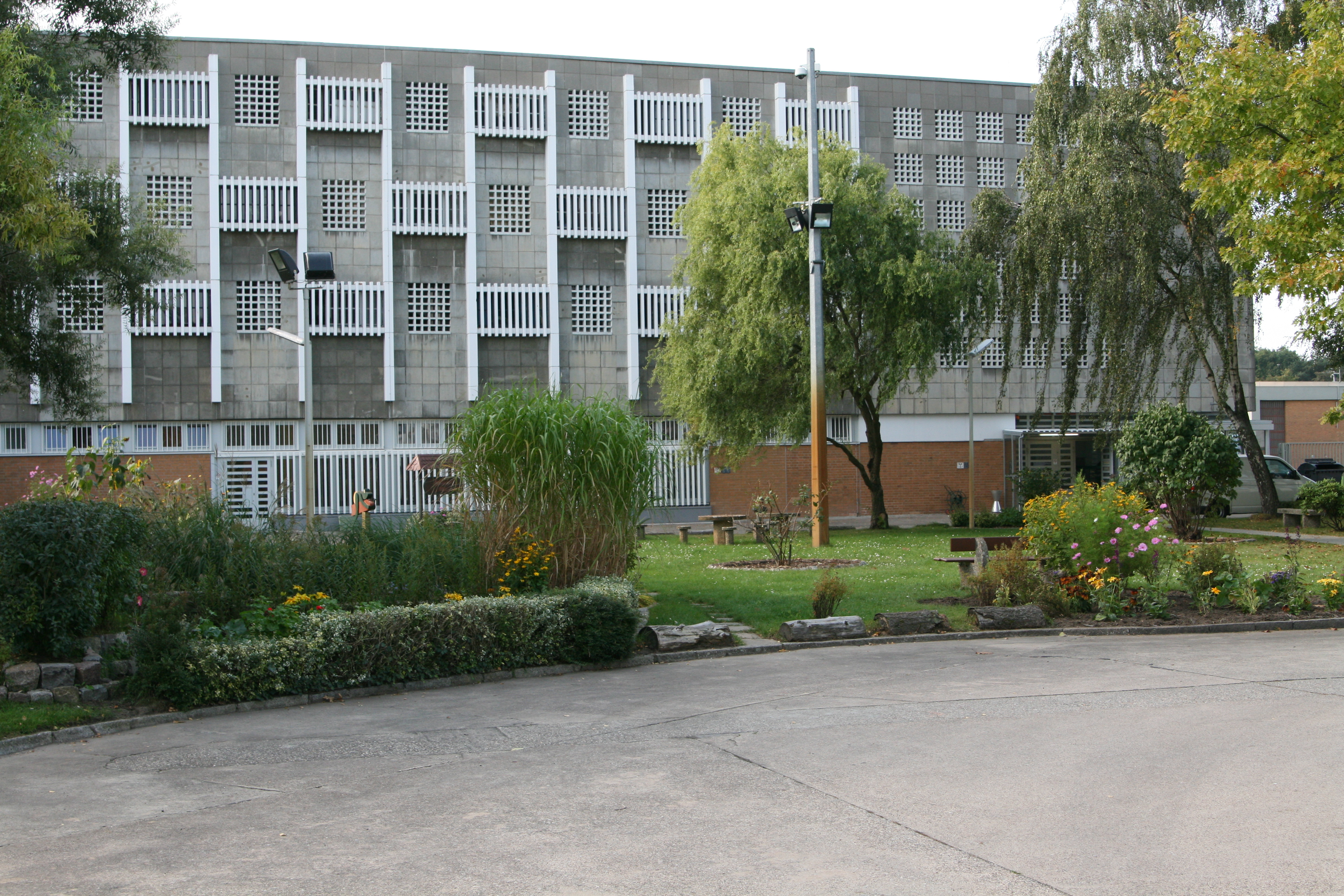
The view of the building of the social therapeutic institution in prison

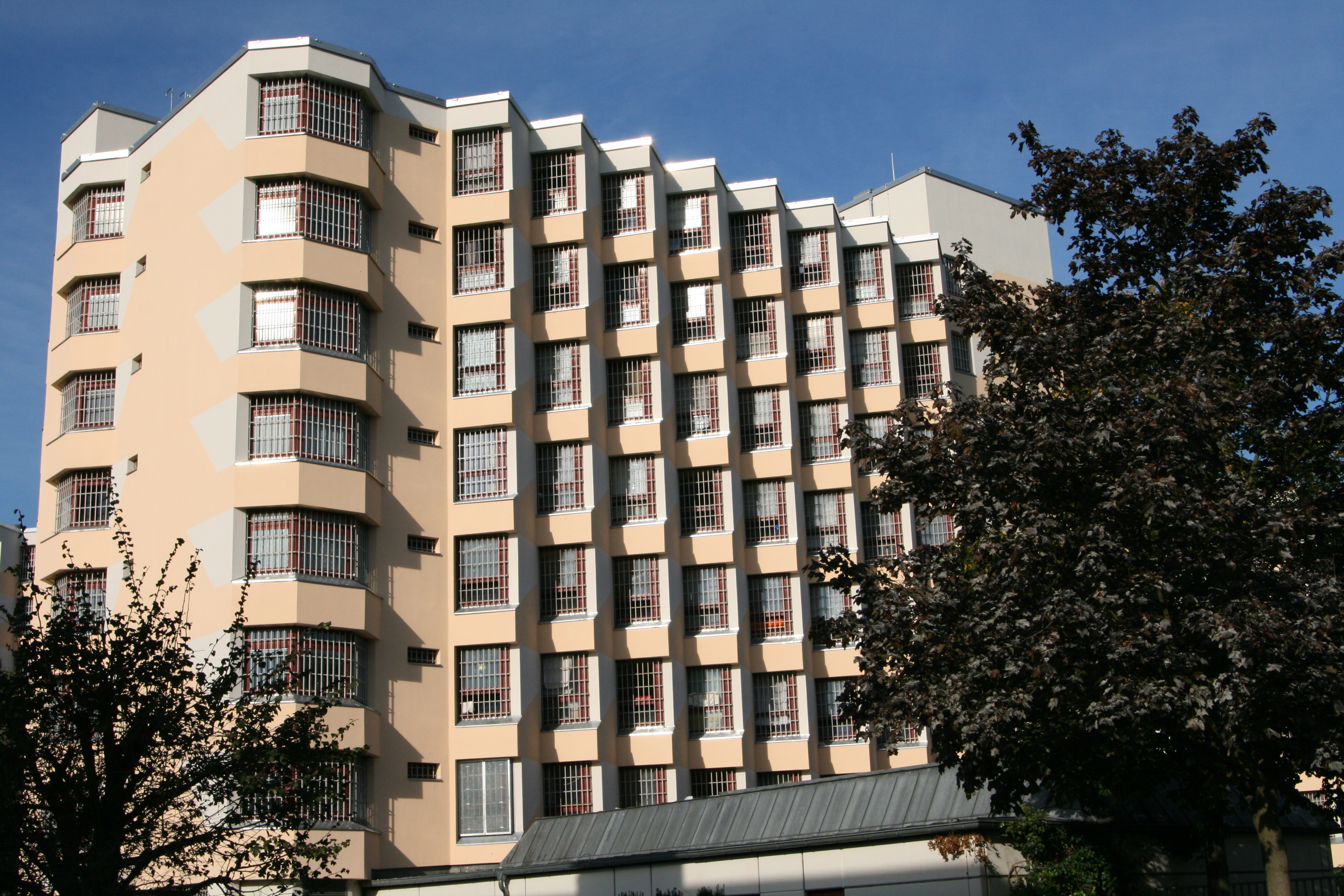
The view of Penitentiary V of Tegel prison

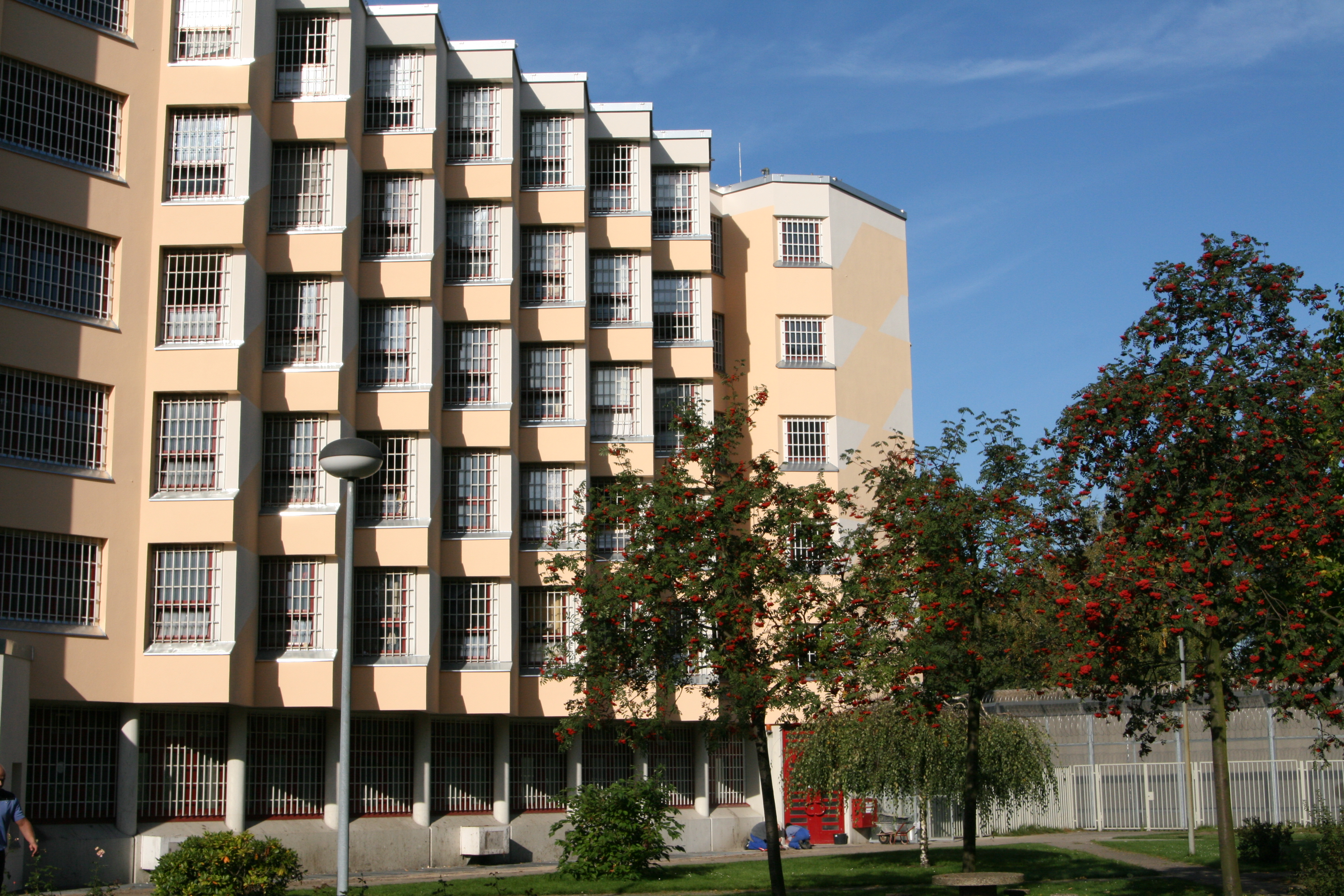
Prison VI of Tegel

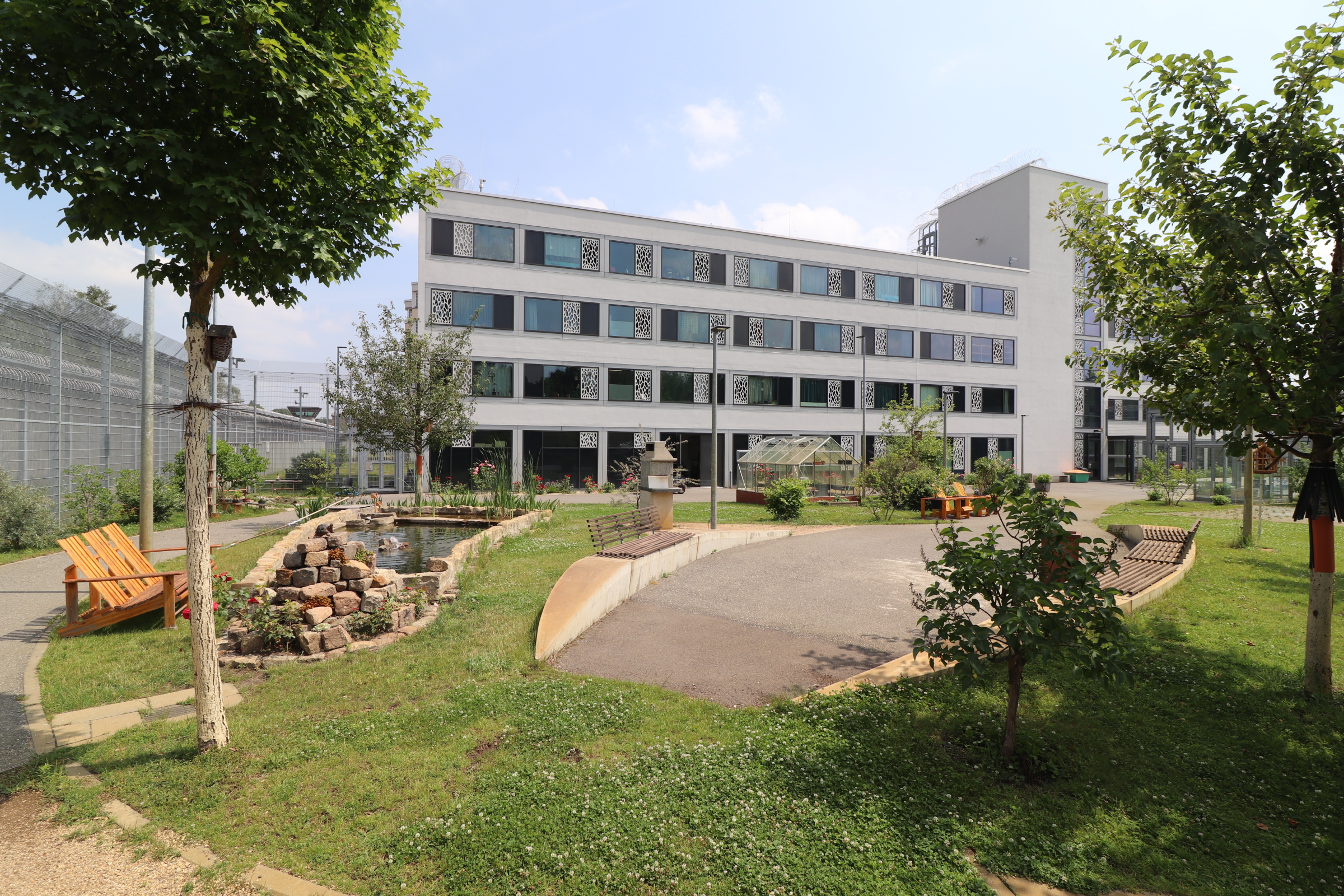
The closed area of the facility for the execution of preventive detention in Tegel Prison

On 26 July 1896, construction of the prison began and on 1 October 1898, the first inmates were admitted. At that time, the prison was called the Tegel Royal Penitentiary. In 1902, all buildings inside the perimeter wall were completed, and in 1906 the buildings outside were completed as well. In 1916, Custody House I became a military prison; the supervisory staff in this wing was provided by the military. In 1918, the prison was renamed Tegel Penitentiary, and in 1931, Custody III was also converted into a military prison.

On 21 April 1945, the prison was dissolved and all inmates were released. The French occupation forces took over the prison in July 1945 and returned it to the German administration in October, which immediately put it back into operation.

In 1955, the prison was renamed Tegel Penitentiary, and in 1957 five watchtowers were built on the ring-shaped perimeter wall.

On 1 April 1977, the name of the prison was changed to Tegel Prison. In 1979, construction began on Penitentiary V, which was completed in 1982, and in 1984, work began on Penitentiary VI, which was completed in 1988.

In the autumn of 2012, Penitentiary I was emptied except for the drug shield station because the prisoner accommodation was not in conformity with the constitution. In July 2015, it was decided to completely vacate and demolish Substitutional Facility I; the demolition was completed in July 2018.

== Well known inmates ==
The German imposter Wilhelm Voigt better known as Captain von Köpenick, was imprisoned in Tegel for almost two years after being convicted of fraud. After being pardoned by Kaiser Wilhelm II, he was able to leave the prison two years into his four sentence, on 16 August 1908.

From 10 May to 22 December 1932, the journalist Carl von Ossietzky, who would later become a Nobel Peace Prize winner, was imprisoned for treason.

The priest, Bernhard Lichtenberg, who was beatified by Pope John Paul II on 23 June 1996, was imprisoned in Tegel from 29 May 1942 to 23 October 1943, for violation of the Pulpit Law and the Treachery Act of 1934.

The theologian Dietrich Bonhoeffer wrote moving letters, mostly from Tegel. He had been imprisoned on 5 April 1943 as an opponent of the Nazis in what was then a military prison. The letters and notes were published with the book Resistance and Surrender by Gütersloher Verlagshaus.

Austrian conscientious objector Franz Jägerstätter was incarcerated in the prison for refusing to take the Hitler oath and subject to trial in July 1943 when he was sentenced to death.

The founder of the Kreisau Circle, Helmuth James von Moltke, was moved from Ravensbrück concentration camp and imprisoned in the Tegel prison on 29 September 1944, in the Totenhaus wing (house of the dead) where he remained until 23 January 1945, when he was hanged. The letters he wrote to his wife Freya von Moltke, collected in "Abschiedsbriefe Gefängnis Tegel" (Farewell Letters from Tegel Prison) were smuggled out by the Protestant chaplain Harald Poelchau. They contain, among other things, the detailed description of everyday life in prison.

SS commander Erich Bauer served part of his life sentence for his participation in The Holocaust at Tegel Prison, from 1971 until his death in 1980.

The bohemian Andreas Baader was imprisoned in Tegel Prison during the period from his arrest on 4 April 1970, until his release on 14 May 1970. He served a three-year prison sentence for causing arson at a department store in Frankfurt on 2 April 1968. After he was released, he became a key figure in the Red Army Faction.

In 1999, the left-wing terrorist Dieter Kunzelmann began his ten-month prison sentence in Tegel by knocking on the front door in a media-effective manner. The photo in Der Spiegel bears the caption "I want to come in here." Before that he had disappeared and had himself declared dead in an obituary. Afterwards he wrote a book and celebrated with a big party at the alternative cultural centre Mehringhof, the night before he was to go to prison.

The ex-rapper Denis Cuspert, active as a rapper under the name Deso Dogg, was also imprisoned for some time in Tegel.

The serial killer Thomas Rung was imprisoned in Tegel Prison around 2000 and committed further offences there, so that the prison finally refused to admit him again.

The vocalist of the right-wing rock bands Landser and Die Lunikoff Verschwörung, Michael Regener, also served his remaining sentence there. On 21 October 2006, there was a concert solidarity rally for him in front of the prison, organised by the National Democratic Party of Germany.

The Russian citizen Vadim Sokolov, charged in the Zelimkhan Khangoshvili murder case by the Federal Prosecutor General, was transferred to the Tegel Prison when his life was in danger. The threat was discovered by the Federal Intelligence Service.

== Culture ==
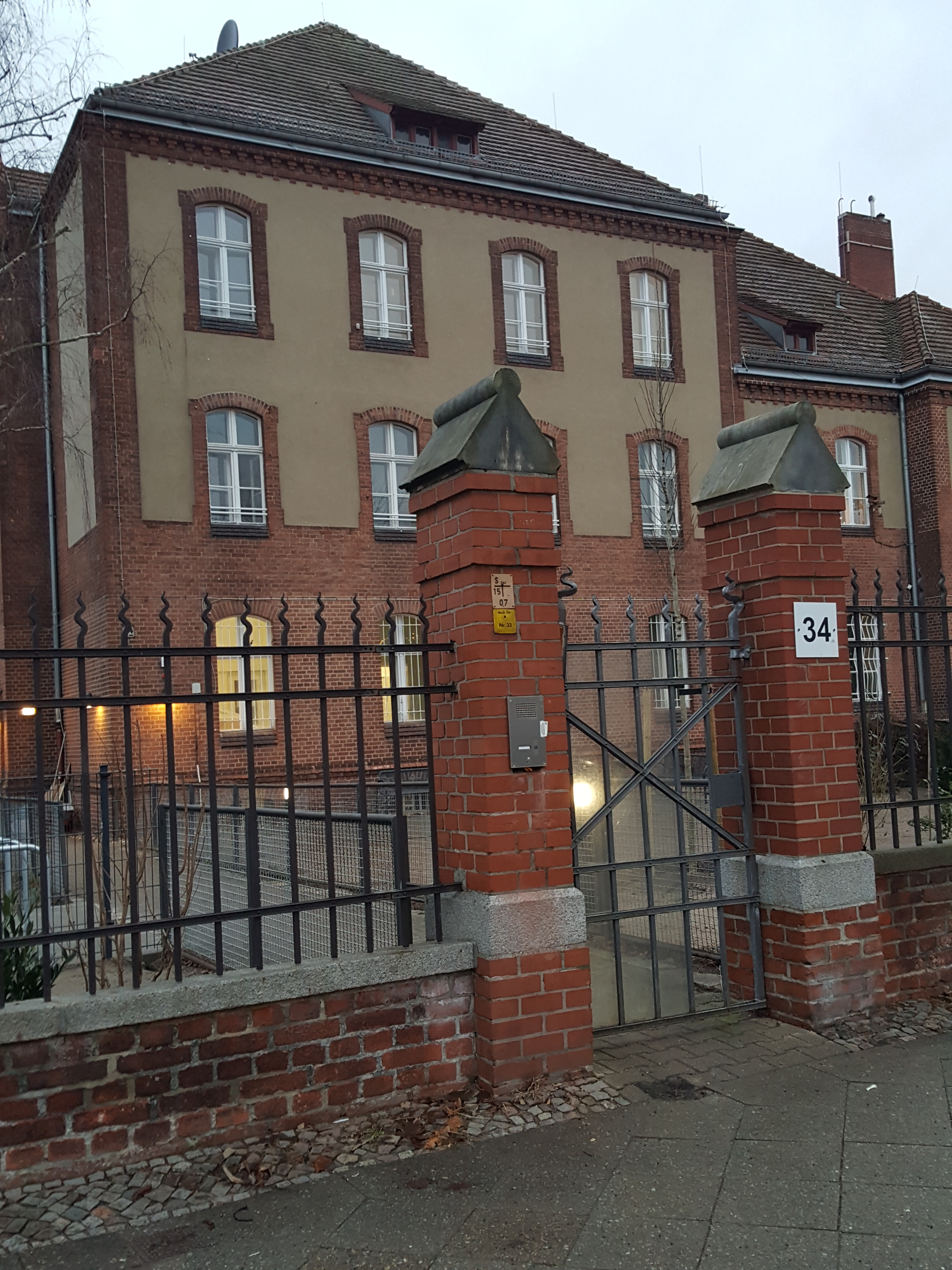
The open area of the facility in the prison

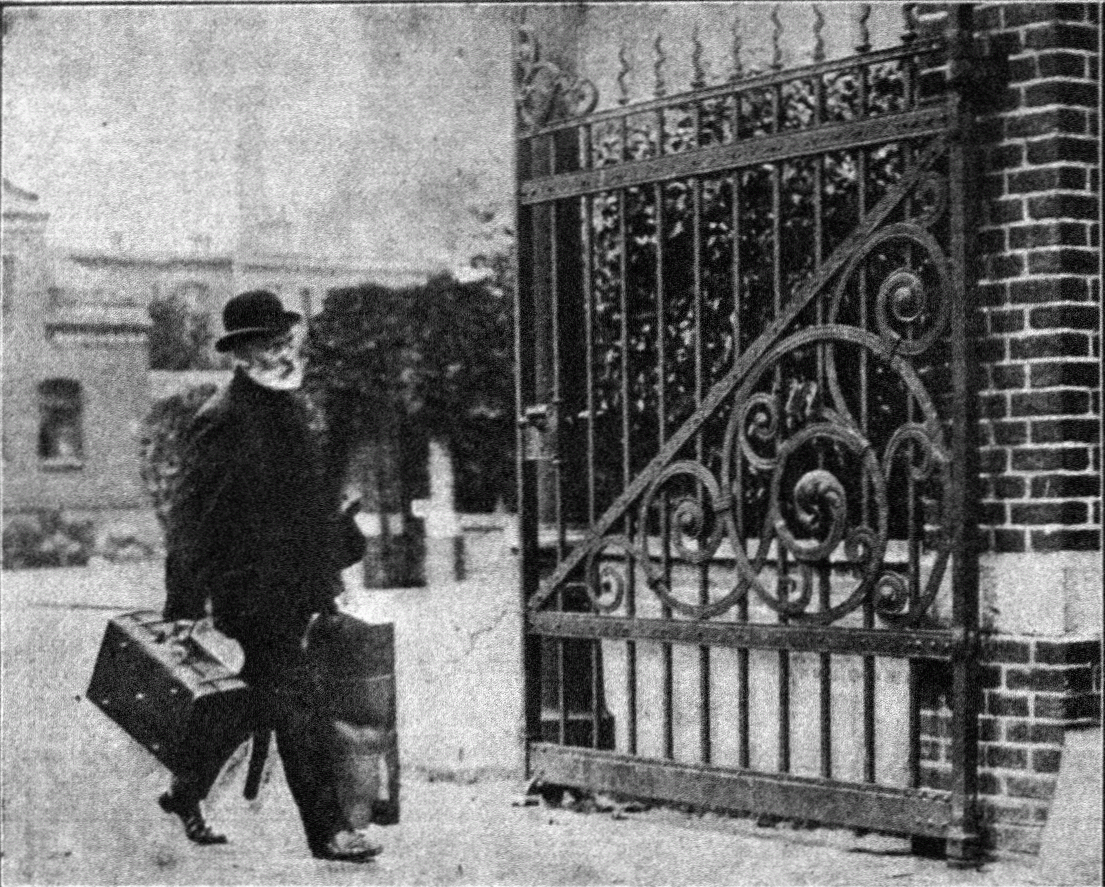
Wilhelm Voigt leaving the prison on 16 August 1908

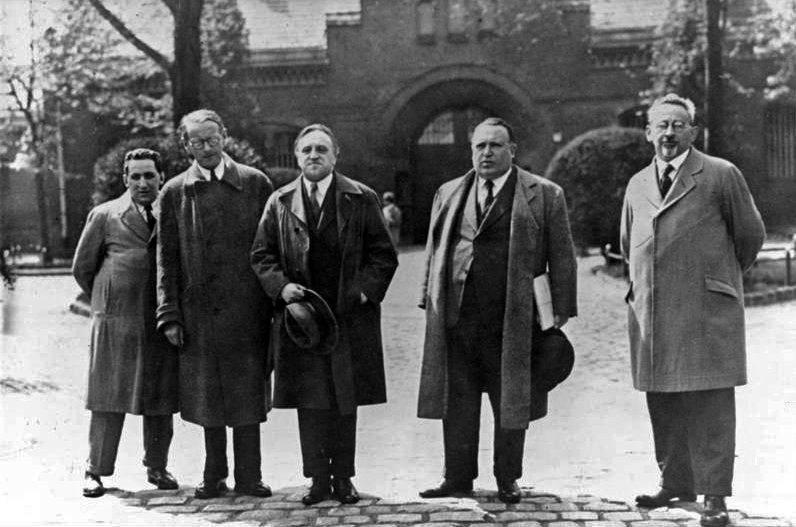
Carl von Ossietzky (centre) before his imprisonment

The essayist Alfred Döblin placed the beginning of his most famous novel Berlin Alexanderplatz (1929) in his literary treatment in Tegel Penitentiary, where the main character, Franz Biberkopf, was imprisoned for four years for the unintentional manslaughter of his partner. Tegel prison appears as a setting in the 1931 film adaptation Berlin - Alexanderplatz by film director Piel Jutzi and in Rainer Werner Fassbinder's film adaptation of this novel for a television series in December 1980.

Prisoners at Tegel Prison have been producing the prison newspaper since 1968. It is Germany's only uncensored prison newspaper that does not have to be submitted to the prison management before publication and has a circulation of 8,500 copies distributed nationwide. The prison newspaper is supported by the Förderverein der Lichtblick e. V. The editor-in-chief in 2012/2013 was Dieter Wurm, a well-known former squatter and bank robber in the city.

Since 1997, the Berlin theatre project Gefängnistheater aufBruch has been organising theatre performances with the inmates. The aim is to make prison, a place excluded from the public sphere, accessible to the public through the medium of art and to give the prisoners a language, a voice and a face through performing craftsmanship that creates the possibility of an unprejudiced encounter between outside and inside. Another aim is to create living theatre at a high artistic level, which is created in the combination of personality and dramatic text and convinces through authenticity and expressiveness.

Another media project of the Tegel prison inmates was the internet portal Planet Tegel in 1998.

== See also ==
- Doctors' Trial
- Karl Brandt
- Spandau Prison in West Berlin
- Sugamo Prison in Tokyo
