= Ruth Andreas-Friedrich =

German journalist

Ruth Andreas-Friedrich

Ruth Andreas-Friedrich (German: [ʁuːt anˌdʁeː.as.ˈfʁiː.dʁɪç]; September 23, 1901 – September 17, 1977) was a German journalist.

She was born Ruth Andreas in Berlin and, as a girl, was a member of the Wandervogel movement. She trained as a social worker and also wrote articles for various newspapers. In 1924, she married Otto A. Friedrich. The couple had a daughter Karin, but later divorced.

With her daughter and her companion Leo Borchard, she helped Jews who were threatened with deportation by the Nazis by providing them with accommodation, forged identity papers and food ration stamps. The group also helped others to escape Germany and distributed flyers advocating resistance to Hitler. Borchard was shot dead in August 1945 by an American soldier after his driver failed to stop at a military checkpoint in Berlin.

In 1947, she published a memoir from her diaries Berlin Underground 1938–1945. A second book Battleground Berlin: Diaries 1945–1948 followed in 1962, and recounted, among other events, her experiences during the Berlin Airlift. At this time, she wrote for a women's magazine, Lilith: The Magazine for Young Girls and Women, and finally left the city during the Airlift after her publication ran out of paper.

In 1948, she moved to Munich. There, she married Walter Seitz, who was also involved in her resistance network during the war.

Andreas-Friedrich died by suicide in Munich at the age of 75.

She was honoured posthumously by Yad Vashem as Righteous Among the Nations in 2002.
