= Dorothee Poelchau =

German librarian and resistance fighter

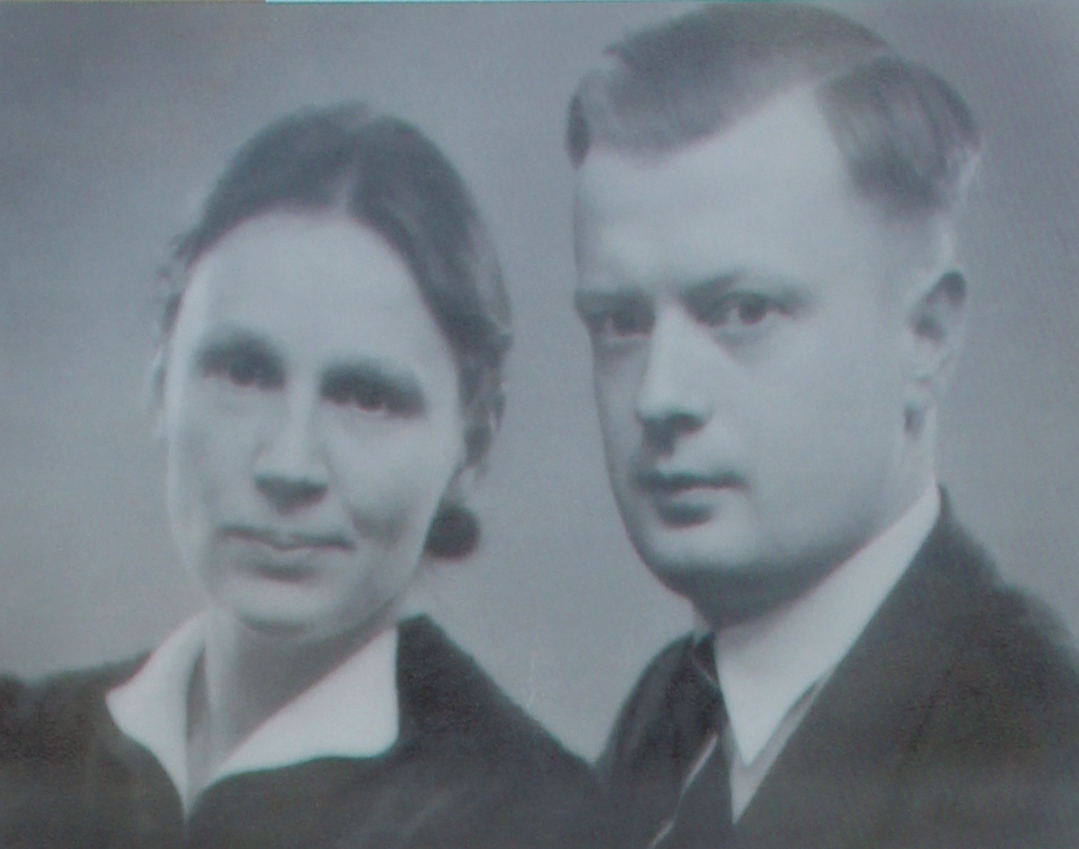
- Dorothee and Harald Poelchau
- Born: 6 June 1902; Steinkirchen
- Died: 4 November 1977 (aged 75)
- Resting place: Zehlendorf cemetery
- Monuments: Memorial stele Poelchaustraße, Märkische Allee, Marzahn
- Occupation: Librarian
- Known for: Resistance fighter
- Spouse: Harald Poelchau
- Awards: Righteous Among the Nations

Dorothee Poelchau (born Dorothee Ziegele; 6 June 1902 in Steinkirchen, 4 November 1977) was a German librarian who together with her husband Harald Poelchau, were resistance fighters against the Nazis. The couple were named Righteous Among the Nations in 1971.

== Life ==
Poelchau was the second daughter of the pastor Paul Eugen Ziegele and his wife Berta from Steinkirchen. After the end of her school education and the first impressions she had received from the German Youth Movement, she began studying German at Leipzig University in the winter semester of 1921/22. Parallel to her studies, she trained at the library school in Leipzig, which she completed in 1923, thereby qualifying her to work for the middle library service. After obtaining employment at the University Library of the University of Tübingen in 1923, she met Harald Poelchau in the same year, who at the time was secretary of the German youth organisation, the Köngener Bund in Tübingen. In 1926, she moved from Tübingen to Berlin, where she accepted a position in the library of the Statistisches Reichsamt (StRA).

After marrying Harald Poelchau, she was opposed to the Nazi regime from the beginning, just like her husband. After her husband took up a position as a prison chaplain in Berlin on 1 April 1933 and began to look after inmates of the German and foreign resistance as well as Jews threatened with deportation, Dorothee Poelchau became "her husband's secret help". When it came to helping Jews in hiding and relatives of political prisoners, she was actively involved by procuring food and looking after the persecutees taken into her own home. Furthermore, she established contacts for the persons designated for accommodation and prepared meals which she gave to her husband for the prisoners in the various prisons. Towards the end of the Second World War, she left Berlin with her son Harald Stephan, but returned there in the summer of 1945.

== Awards and honours ==
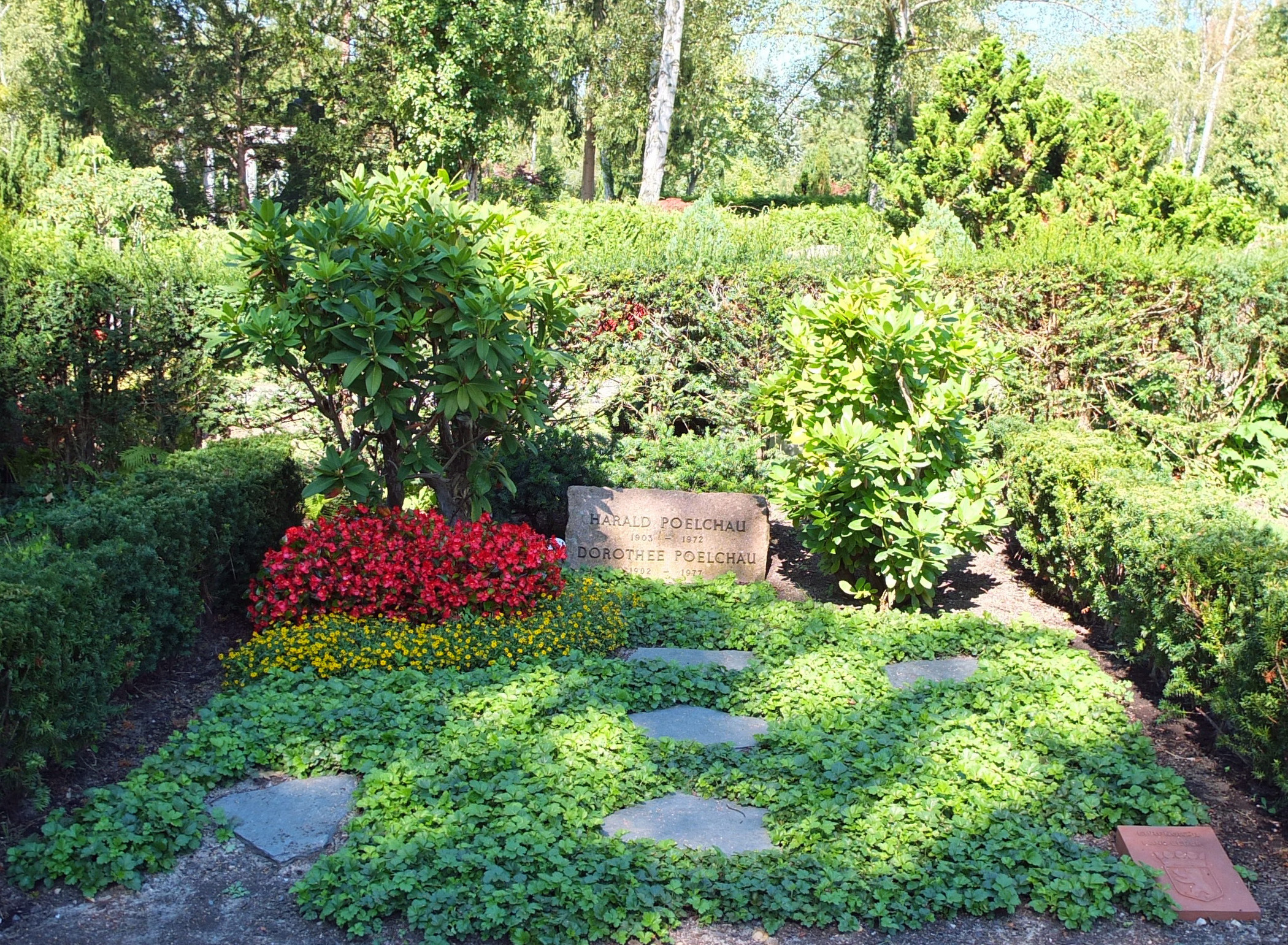
Gravesite of Harald and Dorothee Poelchau at the cemetery Zehlendorf

- By resolution of the Senate of Berlin on 6 October 1987, the couples burial place at the Zehlendorf cemetery was converted into an honorary grave of the State of Berlin.
- On 17 November 1988, a Berlin memorial plaque was affixed to the house at Afrikanische Straße 140b in Wedding in Berlin, where the couple lived from 1933 to 1945.
- On 29 April 1992, an asteroid discovered by Freimut Börngen at the Karl Schwarzschild Observatory was named Poelchau (10348) in honour of the couple.
- On 18 September 2017, a memorial stele for Harald and Dorothee Poelchau was handed over at the corner of Poelchaustraße, Märkische Allee in the Marzahn district of Berlin.
