= Katrin Hattenhauer =

German painter

- Born: 10 November 1968; Nordhausen, East Germany
- Known for: Painting, sculpture, installations

Katrin Hattenhauer (born 10 November 1968) is a German painter and civil rights activist. In the late 1980s she was a member of the GDR-opposition movement. On 4 September 1989 she demonstrated "For an Open Country with Free People", marking the beginning of the Monday demonstrations in Leipzig. Her paintings and social sculptures have been exhibited in Europe.

== Life and work ==
Katrin Hattenhauer was born on 10 November 1968 in Nordhausen, Thuringia, East Germany. She was not allowed to sit the Abitur, Germany's secondary-school examinations. Upon completing her school education she worked as a puppeteer at the local theatre in her home town. She moved on to working for the Wittenberg research centre of the East-German churches and completed an internship at the Zionsparish in Dresden. In 1988 she took up her studies at the church run theological university in Leipzig. However, due to her increased political activity – among other things she had distributed pamphlets for a demonstration in January 1989 - the GDR government pressured the church to force her to leave the university, which she ultimately did. Katrin Hattenhauer was an active member of the Arbeitskreis Gerechtigkeit (Working Committee Justice), an independent Leipzig-based opposition group that was part of the network Initiative Frieden und Menschenrechte (Initiative Peace and Human Rights). Moreover, she was active in the Monday Peaceprayers at the Nikolaichurch, which were coordinated by pastor Christoph Wonneberger.

Together with the former songwriter Jochen Läßig, who had been ex-matriculated from the theological university Leipzig due to his political activity, she organised the first street music festival in the city centre of Leipzig. The festival took place on 10 June 1989. However, the festival had been illegal and numerous contributors, visitors, and pedestrians were arrested. Importantly, the street festival was the first occasion in the GDR on which passers-by solidarised themselves with political dissidents.

The Stasi (Staatsicherheitsdienst, state security service) maintained the operational identity check (Operative Personenkontrolle) 'Meise' (Tit) for the surveillance of Katrin Hattenhauer. Yet, despite the regular Stasi-interrogations and an order that prevented her from earning a living almost entirely, she continued to commit herself to political change in the GDR. She went on hunger strike at the Thomas-church Leipzig and criticised the constitutional capacity of the SED directly and openly. Referring to Václav Havel she called for the 'bond-slaves' in a system of paternalism' to 'renounce resignation in the society': 'We pray for wisdom and courage, so that what is limited to narrowness and prison for so many may become our home country again'.

On 4 September 1989 she initiated, together with Gesine Oltmanns, a demonstration in front of the Nikolaichurch, after the Monday Peace Prayer held there. Both women had prepared four banners, had smuggled them into the church circumventing their surveillants from the Stasi. Coming out into the public square the two women then unfolded their banner that called for 'Für ein offenes Land mit freien Menschen' (For an Open Country with Free People), while more activists followed them with the other banners.

About 50 activists and 250 people who wanted to emigrate from the GDR joined behind them in a first attempt to move on demonstrating, some shouting 'we want to get out', others 'we stay'. Western TV teams, which had been allowed into Leipzig to cover the fair, had secretly been informed that something would be happening in front of the church. Thus, the footage of the demonstration became the lead story in West-Germany's TV-news, carrying the pictures of this first Mondaydemonstration into every household in East-Germany. Eventually, Stasimen tore down the banners and wrestled down the women but no one was arrested before the cameras since the GDR feared the publicity.

On the following Monday, 11 September, Katrin Hattenhauer was targeted demonstrating on Nikolaisquare and arrested together with other protesters and put in the Stasi-prison at Leipzig Beethoven Strasse, where she was imprisoned until 13.10.1089. In prison she was kept in solitary confinement for most of the time and interrogated brutally. Yet, on each following Monday more and more people joined the Mondaydemonstrations in Leipzig, contributing decisively to the eventual downfall of the GDR regime. Regular services and public vigils in different cities of the GDR called for the release of the unjustly imprisoned. Thus, focal points of protest developed, accelerating the democratic revolution. Katrin Hattenhauer was well known in opposition-circles and church-groups in the GDR, she had participated in the Oecomenical Convention and taken part in trans-regional ecological seminars. She was the Leipzig contact person to the ecological library (Umweltbibliothek) a meeting point of the opposition groups in East-Berlin.

In 1991 she helped to establish the Archiv Bürgerbewegung Leipzig (The Archiv Bürgerbewegung received the German National Award in 2015), working on the board. On 8 October 2000 she and Jochen Läßig, another dissident, opened the "Lichtfest" (Festival of Light) in Leipzig, speaking in front of 200.000 people to remember the crucial turning point in 1989. On 7 November 2014 Katrin Hattenhauer spoke at Germany's ceremonial act, celebrating the 25 year anniversary of the fall of the wall and German reunification at the Brandenburg Gate. There, she addressed the younger generation, urging them to 'take their freedom and live their dreams. The touring exhibition 'Revolution is female' recognizes her and other women's contributions to the Peaceful Revolution 1989.

Katrin Hattenhauer often comments on the Peaceful Revolution 1989 and questions of German unity. Similarly, she speaks on radio, TV and frequently at schools, answering questions about civil courage. She is serving on the board of the Kreisau-Initiative and on the historical commission of the Krzyzowa/Kreisau foundation in Poland. In October 2015 she initiated an open letter of former East-German dissidents to Angela Merkel, supporting a policy of open borders for refugees who seek political asylum. The letter was published by the Deutsche Welle in English, French, Russian and Spanish.

She has got one son and is living together with her husband in Berlin and Oxford.

== Work as an artist ==
In the wake of the Peaceful Revolution Katrin Hattenhauer became an artist. Her first exhibition "Magical Theatre" was opened in her flat in Leipzig on 9.December 1989. She has had exhibitions in numerous places in Europe and in the United States. The secretary-general of the biennial national Protestant gathering (Deutscher Evangelischer Kirchentag), Ellen Ueberschär, described her art as follows: "Hattenhauer's art is not GDR-art, not art of the GDR, it is an answer to the GDR, it is the 'even though' of an art that says 'Yes' to freedom against all odds.” Her figurative paintings focus on human emotion, freedom, and civil engagement. The late Freya von Moltke wrote about her: In the time before and around 1989, Katrin Hattenhauer has dared to demand freedom and has experienced what that can mean for the personal future. Stemming from this experience her paintings express great courage and joy in life." Katrin Hattenhauer, continually works with young people, using her art to approach questions of personal freedom and civil courage. In the last years Katrin Hattenhauer has turned towards and focused on installation art addressing various political and societal topics. "Lichtgestalten" about role models, Mannheim 2012, "Müllwiese" (Rubbish Meadow) Hamburg shed and artistic light on the pollution of the oceans through plastic waste, while 'Über das Verschwinden (On Disappearing), London and Leipzig, raised awareness of the murder of political dissidents. At the moment she is linked with the Social Sculpture Unit, Brookes University Oxford.

Katrin Hattenhauer was awarded the Officer's Cross of the German Order of Merit.

== Exhibitions (selected) ==
- 1999: 'Return to Freedom', part of 'Leipzig remembers the autumn of 89', Nikolaichurch, Leipzig.
- 2002: 'Dragonflight', Marketchurch Goslar.
- 2002: 'Daring Freedom', in cooperation with the foundation and memorial place Krzyżowa/Kreisau.
- 2003: Art-workshops with youths from Lithuania, Poland, and Germany, Krzyżowa
- 2005: 'Inno alla Libertà', in cooperation with the Instituto di Cultura Germanica (Leipzig), Villa Aldrovandi Mazzacorati, Bologna
- 2006: 'Lovers', Artforum Rheinhessen, Kunstverein Essenheim
- 2009: 'La Ragazza di Capelli Rossi', Sala Museale del Barracano, Bologna
- 2009: 'Pieces of Paradise', Zionschurch, Berlin
- 2009: 'Pezzi di Paradiso', Chiesa Luterana, Florence
- 2009: 'Lightroom Project', exhibition, Nikolaichurch, Leipzig
- 2010: 'A short Summer long', Galerie Richard, Berlin
- 2010: 'Paradise Bound', Red Bud Gallery Houston
- 2012: 'Figures of Light', City-Church Konkordien, Mannheim
- 2013: 'Rubbish Meadow', Fishmarket, Hamburg
- 2014: 'On Disappearing', London, Leipzig
- 2016: 'InsideOutside', Oxford, United Kingdom

== Catalogues ==
- Katrin Hattenhauer – 'Daring Freedom'. Exhibition catalogue with an introduction by Freya von Moltke. Krzyżowa/Kreisau, 2002.
- Katrin Hattenhauer – 'Pieces of Paradise'. Exhibition catalogue with contributions by Matteo Deichmann, Joachim Daniel Jaeger, Eva-Maria Menard, Ellen Ueberschär, Kazimierz Wóycicki, Nordhausen, 2009.
- Katrin Hattenhauer – 'Two Friends'. Booklet on Hattenhauer's painting in the sanctuary of the Nikolaichurch, with contributions by Martin Henker, Frank Pörner und Ellen Ueberschär, Leipzig, 2014.

== Literature (selected) ==
- Steffen Lieberwirth: „wer eynen spielmann zv Tode schlaegt ..." Ein mittelalterliches Zeitdokument anno 1989. Edition Peters, Leipzig 1990, ISBN 978-3-369-00272-4
- Grit Hartmann: Der Leipziger Herbst war „draußen". Interview mit Katrin Hattenhauer. In: Neues Forum Leipzig (publisher): „Jetzt oder nie – Demokratie!" Leipziger Herbst ’89. Forum Verlag, Leipzig 1990, ISBN 978-3-570-06935-6. pp. 296–301.
- Uwe Schwabe: „Für ein offenes Land mit freien Menschen." Geschichte einer Losung. In: Bernd Lindner (publisher): Zum Herbst ’89. Demokratische Bewegung in der DDR. Forum Verlag, Leipzig 1994, ISBN 978-3-86151-062-8. pp. 9–10.
- Christian Dietrich, Uwe Schwabe (Hg.): Freunde und Feinde. Dokumente zu den Friedensgebeten in Leipzig zwischen 1981 und dem 9. Oktober 1989. Evangelische Verlagsanstalt, Leipzig 1994, ISBN 978-3-374-01551-1.
- Thomas Rudolph, Oliver Kloss, Rainer Müller, Christoph Wonneberger (publisher): Weg in den Aufstand. Chronik zu Opposition und Widerstand in der DDR vom August 1987 bis zum Dezember 1989. Bd. 1, Leipzig, Araki, 2014, ISBN 978-3-941848-17-7.
- Ehrhart Neubert: Geschichte der Opposition in der DDR 1949–1989. Ch. Links, Berlin 1998, ISBN 978-3-86153-163-0.
- Uwe Schwabe, Rainer Eckert (publisher): Von Deutschland Ost nach Deutschland West: Oppositionelle oder Verräter? Forum Verlag, Leipzig 2003, ISBN 3-931801-38-1.
- Bärbel Bohley, Gerald Praschl, Rüdiger Rosenthal: Gesine Oltmanns – „Bleib erschütterbar und widersteh". in: Mut. Frauen in der DDR. Herbig, München 2005, ISBN 978-3-7766-2434-2. pp. 194–220.
- Martin Jankowski: Der Tag, der Deutschland veränderte – 9. Oktober 1989. Essay. Schriftenreihe des Sächsischen Landesbeauftragten für die Stasiunterlagen, Nr. 7. Evangelische Verlagsanstalt, Leipzig 2007, ISBN 978-3-374-02506-0.
- Gerold Hildebrand: „Für ein offenes Land mit freien Menschen". Eine Leipzigerin über Befreiung und Freiheit. In: Gerbergasse 18, 13. Jg., Nr. 48 (1/2008). pp. 29–31.
- Niels Beckenbach (publisher): Fremde Brüder. Der schwierige Weg zur deutschen Einheit. Duncker & Humblot, Berlin 2008, ISBN 978-3-428-12727-6.
- Thomas Mayer: Helden der Friedlichen Revolution. 18 Porträts von Wegbereitern aus Leipzig. Evangelische Verlagsanstalt, Leipzig 2009, ISBN 978-3-374-02712-5.
- Thomas Mayer: Hier stehe ich und kann nicht anders, 30 Lebensbilder von Menschen mit Haltung. EVA, Leipzig 2016
- Wolfgang Schuller: Die deutsche Revolution 1989. Rowohlt, Berlin 2009, ISBN 978-3-87134-573-9.
- Kurzbiografie zu: Hattenhauer, Katrin. In: Wer war wer in der DDR? 5. Ausgabe. Band 1, Ch. Links, Berlin 2010, ISBN 978-3-86153-561-4.
- Eckhard Jesse: Wegbereiterin der friedlichen Revolution in Leipzig, in: Sächsischer Landtag (publisher): Landtagskurier, ed. 3 (2016), Dresden, pp. 18–19.

== Documentaries and panel discussions (selected) ==
- 'Fear of Punishment', talk with former East-German secretary of defence Rainer Eppelmann and Katrin Hattenhauer, Planet Wissen, Südwestdeutscher Rundfunk SWR, 8.10.2014
- 'The Rebels – Regime Change in East Germany', Documentary on Katrin Hattenhauer, Jochen Läßig and Catrin Ulbricht, Deutsche Welle (DW), in Arabic, English, Spanish, and German, 2014.
- 'Of gentle and peaceful revolutions', talk with J. Budaj, B. Grexa, K. Hattenhauer, M. Meckel, A. Popovic, Slovakian Embassy in cooperation with the German Foundation for Rehabilitation, 2014.
- '25 years Peaceful Revolution', panel discussion with German Secretary of Justice Heiko Maas, Katrin Hattenhauer, Prof. Hans-Walter Hütter, former German foreign secretary Klaus Kinkel, Georg Mascolo, 2014
- 'Fall of the Berlin Wall – 25 Years on', Agenda Talk with K.Hattenhauer, ambassador J.Kornblum, R. Lentz, Deutsche Welle, 4.11.2014
