= Leo Borchard =

German conductor (1899–1945)

Leo Borchard

Lew Ljewitsch "Leo" Borchard (31 March 1899 – 23 August 1945) was a German-Russian conductor and briefly musical director of the Berlin Philharmonic.

== Biography ==
Borchard was born in Moscow to German parents, and grew up in Saint Petersburg where he received a solid musical education, as well being a regular visitor to the Stanislavsky Theatre. In 1920, after the Russian Revolution, he emigrated to Germany. Otto Klemperer engaged him as his assistant at the Kroll Opera in Berlin (Klemperer, lacking confidence in his own abilities, expected Borchard to critique his conducting technique). He conducted the Berlin Philharmonic for the first time in January 1933. In 1935, he was banned by the Nazi regime as politically unreliable. He continued teaching at his apartment and received his friends, including Boris Blacher and Gottfried von Einem.

During World War II he remained in Berlin as a Resistance activist under the name Andrik Krassnow, in the group Uncle Emil, during which time his duties included contact with Ludwig Lichtwitz, a specialist in false identity papers.

On 26 May 1945, two and a half weeks after Germany's unconditional surrender, he conducted the Berlin Philharmonic at the Titania Palast cinema, in a concert featuring the Overture to Mendelssohn's A Midsummer Night's Dream, Mozart's Violin Concerto in A major and Tchaikovsky's Symphony No. 4, to great public acclaim. One week later he was appointed musical director of the orchestra by the Soviet official Nikolai Berzarin, replacing Wilhelm Furtwängler, who was in exile in Switzerland. His anti-Nazi credentials and command of the Russian language enabled him to enjoy a close relationship with the occupiers. He gave 22 concerts in total as chief conductor of the BPO.

After a concert on 23 August 1945 Borchard and his partner Ruth Andreas-Friedrich were invited to dinner by a British colonel. The pair had a wonderful evening especially as it gave them the chance to eat real meat and sandwiches made with white bread. Afterwards there was whiskey to enjoy as they discussed music and other subjects with their host. There was a curfew at 10.45pm, but the colonel assured them there was no need to hurry home as he would drive them home in his official car. Unfortunately there had been a gunfight between some drunk Americans and Russians the previous night which meant the checkpoints were on edge in Berlin. Their British driver misinterpreted an American sentry's hand signal to stop at the checkpoint on the border between the British and American sectors at Kaiserplatz (today called Bundesplatz, in Wilmersdorf, a borough of Berlin) and drove through. This caused the sentries to open fire on the car killing Borchard instantly. The British driver and Andreas-Friedrich survived. As a result of this incident, it was decided to mark military checkpoints more prominently so that hand signals were not required.

== Memorials ==
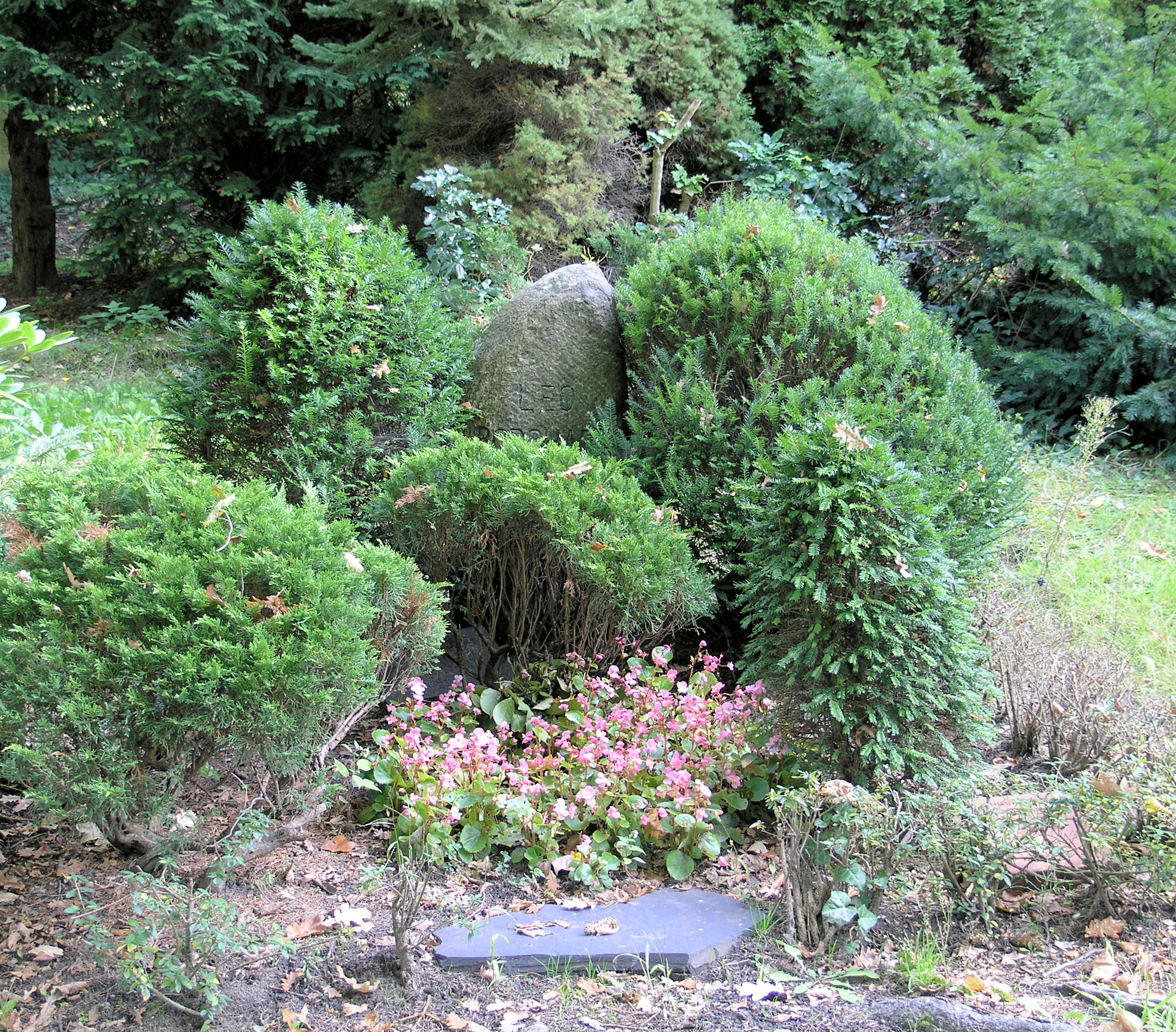
Memorial, Berlin-Steglitz, Germany

In 1943 Gottfried von Einem dedicated his Capriccio for Orchestra, op. 2 to him. Borchard also conducted the world premiere with the Berlin Philharmonic on 11 March 1943.

In October 1988, a Berlin memorial plaque was unveiled on former the home of Andreas-Friedrich and Borchard.

In April 1990, the music school in the Berlin district of Steglitz was named the Leo-Borchard-Musikschule (Leo Borchard Music School). Today it is considered the largest music school in Germany.

On 5 and 6 September 1995 Claudio Abbado and the Berlin Philharmonic marked the anniversary of Borchard's death with performances of Mahler's 6th Symphony.

== Recordings ==
- Boccherini – Minuet
- Delibes – Mazurka & Valse Lente from Coppelia
- Françaix – Piano Concertino
- Glazunov – Stenka Razin*
- Puccini – orchestral selection from Tosca
- Rebikov – Berceuse
- Suppé – Overture to Banditenstreiche
- Tchaikovsky – Fantasy Overture, Romeo and Juliet*; Excerpts from The Nutcracker
- Wagner – Wotan's Farewell
- Weber – Overture Oberon*

(*broadcasts from June 1945)
